= Bendheim (surname) =

Bendheim is a surname. Notable people with the surname include:

- Charles Bendheim (1866–1934), American politician from Virginia
- Els Bendheim (1923–2023), Jewish photographer and author
- Leroy S. Bendheim (1906–1987), American politician from Virginia
- Otto Bendheim (1911–2003), American psychiatrist, born in Frankfurt, Germany, lived in Arizona
- Frederick (Fred) Bendheim (1956-)

American visual artist living in NY
