= Senator Bateman =

Senator Bateman may refer to:

- Ephraim Bateman (1780–1829), U.S. Senator from New Jersey from 1826 to 1829
- Fred W. Bateman (1916–1999), Virginia State Senate
- Herbert H. Bateman (1928–2000), Virginia State Senate
- Kip Bateman (born 1957), New Jersey State Senate
- Oliver Bateman (1923–2012), Georgia State Senate
- Raymond Bateman (1927–2016), New Jersey State Senate
