= Lawrence Corbett =

Lawrence Corbett may refer to:

- Lawrence W. Corbett (1859–1897), American politician from Virginia
- Lawrence E. Corbett Jr. (1921–2020), American politician from New York
