= Franklin Backus =

Franklin Backus may refer to:

- Franklin P. Backus (1913–2007), judge and mayor of Alexandria, Virginia
- Franklin Thomas Backus (1813–1870), American lawyer and politician
