= Harry H. Vaughan =

Aide to the President of the United States from 1945 to 1953

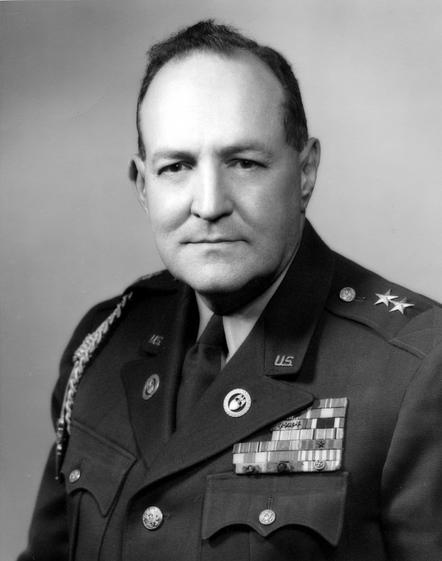
- Vaughan in uniform, c. 1946 – c. 1953
- Born: Harry Hawkins Vaughan; November 26, 1893; Glasgow, Missouri, U.S.
- Died: May 20, 1981 (aged 87); DeWitt Army Hospital, Fort Belvoir, Virginia, U.S.
- Burial place: Ivy Hill Cemetery, Alexandria, Virginia, U.S. 38°49′00.9″N 77°04′25.0″W
- Education: Westminster College (BA)
- Spouse: Margaret L. Pilcher (m. 1920)
- Children: 2
- Military career
- Branch: Army Reserve
- Service years: 1917–1919 (active); 1920–1942 (reserve); 1942–1953 (active)
- Rank: Major General
- Units: Aide to the President of the United States; Aide to the Vice President of the United States
- Conflicts: World War I: St. Mihiel; Meuse-Argonne; Defensive Sector; World War II: Asiatic-Pacific Theater
- Awards: Silver Star (2); Bronze Star (2); Commendation Medal (3); Croix de guerre 1914–1918; Order of Duarte (Dominican Republic); Medal of Military Merit (Mexico)
- Football career

Westminster Blue Jays
- Position: Center
- Class: Junior

Career information
- College: Westminster College (1912–1915)

Major General Harry Hawkins Vaughan (November 26, 1893 – May 20, 1981) was a senior officer in the United States Army Reserve and the aide to Harry S. Truman during his time as vice president (1945) and president (1945 to 1953). He was one of Truman's closest advisors.

== Early life and career ==
Harry Hawkins Vaughan was born on November 26, 1893, in Glasgow, Missouri. In 1916, he graduated from Westminster College in Fulton, Missouri. With the United States' entry into World War I, Vaughan was commissioned second lieutenant in the Field Artillery and was assigned for military training at Fort Sill, Oklahoma.

During the training, Vaughan befriended another officer, future U.S. President Harry S. Truman. They were both assigned to the 129th Field Artillery Regiment within the 35th Division and sent to France. Vaughan participated in the Battle of Saint-Mihiel or the Meuse-Argonne Offensive. He served as a liaison officer and battery commander, and for his service in combat, he was later decorated with two Silver Stars and the French Croix de Guerre.

Vaughan returned to active duty in World War II, was injured in a plane crash in 1943, and was assigned to the staff of the Truman Committee. Truman made him the first vice presidential military aide in 1945; he continued as military aide to the president when Truman succeeded Franklin D. Roosevelt, and remained in the post until the end of Truman's presidency in 1953. When Truman was vice president, Vaughan went to Treasury Secretary Henry Morgenthau and demanded a Secret Service agent be assigned to Truman. Agent George Drescher became the first Secret Service agent assigned to a vice president.

In the 1950s, Vaughan was accused of bribery. In 1951, White House Appointments Secretary Matthew J. Connelly asked legal counsel Max Lowenthal to help General Harry H. Vaughan in "setting up testimony." Vaughan admitted repeated episodes of trading access to the White House for expensive gifts.

== Death ==
Vaughan died at Fort Belvoir, Virginia's DeWitt Army Hospital on May 21, 1981. He was buried at Ivy Hill Cemetery in Alexandria, Virginia.

== Dates of rank ==
Rank	Date	Service
Captain	1918	Missouri National Guard
Major	1928	United States Army Reserve
Lieutenant Colonel	1935	United States Army Reserve
Colonel	1943	United States Army Reserve
Brigadier General	1945	United States Army Reserve
Major General	1946	United States Army Reserve

== See also ==
- List of members of the American Legion
- List of people from Missouri
