= Frank E. Mann =

American politician (1920–2007)

Mayor of Alexandria, Virginia
- In office July 1, 1976 – July 1, 1979
- Preceded by: Charles E. Beatley
- Succeeded by: Charles E. Beatley
- In office July 1, 1961 – July 1, 1967
- Preceded by: Leroy S. Bendheim
- Succeeded by: Charles E. Beatley

Member of the Virginia House of Delegates from the 21st district
- In office January 14, 1970 – January 14, 1976 Serving with James M. Thomson
- Preceded by: Marion Galland
- Succeeded by: Richard R. G. Hobson

Personal details
- Born: May 1, 1920 Atlanta, Georgia
- Died: April 25, 2007 (aged 86) Alexandria, Virginia
- Party: Democratic (until 1976); Independent (1976–2007)
- Education: George Washington University

Frank E. Mann (May 1, 1920 – April 25, 2007) was a politician from the state of Virginia. He served as mayor of Alexandria from 1961 to 1967 as a Democrat and again from 1976 to 1979 as an independent. He was also a member of the Virginia House of Delegates from 1970 to 1975.

== Early life ==
Frank Mann was born in Atlanta, Georgia, on May 1, 1920, and moved to Washington, D.C., as a boy. His mother was a descendant of Alexandria's historic Lee family. He graduated from McKinley Technology High School and was a 1941 graduate of George Washington University. During World War II, he served with the Seabees in the Navy and won a Bronze Star. He married Patricia Horne in 1940 and that marriage later ended in divorce. He later married Anita Rowland Izo of Alexandria in 1975 whom he was married to until his death. At the time of his death he had a daughter from his first marriage, Patty Lee Briggs of Laurel; two stepchildren, Amy Izo Fang of Arlington and Eric Izo of New York; seven grandchildren; and two great-grandchildren.

== Politics ==
Mann was elected mayor of Alexandria, Virginia, in 1961, and served nine years, but not consecutively. During his first two terms as mayor, Mann refused a salary, instead giving it to city employees seeking specialized training.

He left his position as mayor in 1967, and ran for the Virginia House of Delegates in 1969. He was elected to succeed Marion Galland and spent five years in the Virginia General Assembly (a part-time position) alongside conservative Democrat James McIlhany Thomson, during which the district's numbering changed.

Mann ran for mayor again in 1976 as an Independent. He defeated Democrat Melvin Bergheim and served until 1979, when he was defeated for reelection by Charles E. Beatley (whom he had succeeded) by a nearly two to one margin. Mann never held elected office again.

== Death ==
Mann died on April 25, 2007, of prostate cancer at his home in Old Town Alexandria. He was survived by his wife of thirty two years, Anita Rowland Mann, and three children and step-children.

Political offices
Preceded by Leroy S. Bendheim	Mayor of the City of Alexandria, Virginia; 1961–1967	Succeeded by Charles E. Beatley
Preceded by Charles E. Beatley	Mayor of the City of Alexandria, Virginia; 1976–1979	Succeeded by Charles E. Beatley
Virginia House of Delegates
Preceded by James McIlhany Thomson	Virginia House, District 5; 1970–1972	Succeeded by Jefferson C. Stafford
Preceded by Russell M. Carneal	Virginia House, District 21; 1973–1975	Succeeded by Richard R. G. Hobson
