= Gary Myers =

Gary Myers may refer to:

- Gary A. Myers (1937–2020), U.S. Representative from Pennsylvania
- Gary Myers (writer) (born 1952), American writer of fantasy and horror
- Gary Myers (actor) (born 1941), British actor
- Gary Myers (lawyer) (born 1944), American lawyer
- Gary Myers (racing driver) (1950–2026), American stock car racing driver
