= Maurice D. Rosenberg =

American politician (1909–1950)

Maurice D. Rosenberg (January 4, 1909 – November 8, 1950) was an attorney and Democratic member of the Virginia House of Delegates representing Alexandria, Virginia.

== Early life ==
Rosenberg was born January 4, 1909, in Harrisonburg, Virginia, and attended the Alexandria public schools. He graduated from George Washington University in Washington, D.C., and received his law degree from the same university.

He served on the executive committee of B'nai B'rith for many years, beginning in the 1920s. Rosenberg was also a member of many local Alexandria organizations, including the Independent Order of Odd Fellows, the Benevolent and Protective Order of Elks, the Knights of Pythias, the Eagles, the Virginia Bar Association, the Alexandria Bar Association and the Old Dominion Boat Club.

== Political career ==
In 1935, Rosenberg was elected to the Virginia House of Delegates representing the City of Alexandria. He was reelected three more times and served until 1943.

== Death and memorials ==
Rosenberg died on November 8, 1950. The local chapter of B'nai B'rith is named for Maurice D. Rosenberg.

Virginia House of Delegates
Preceded by J. Fred Birrel	Representing Alexandria, Virginia; 1936–1944	Succeeded by W. Selden Washington
