= Ivy Hill Cemetery (Alexandria, Virginia) =

Cemetery in Alexandria, Virginia, US

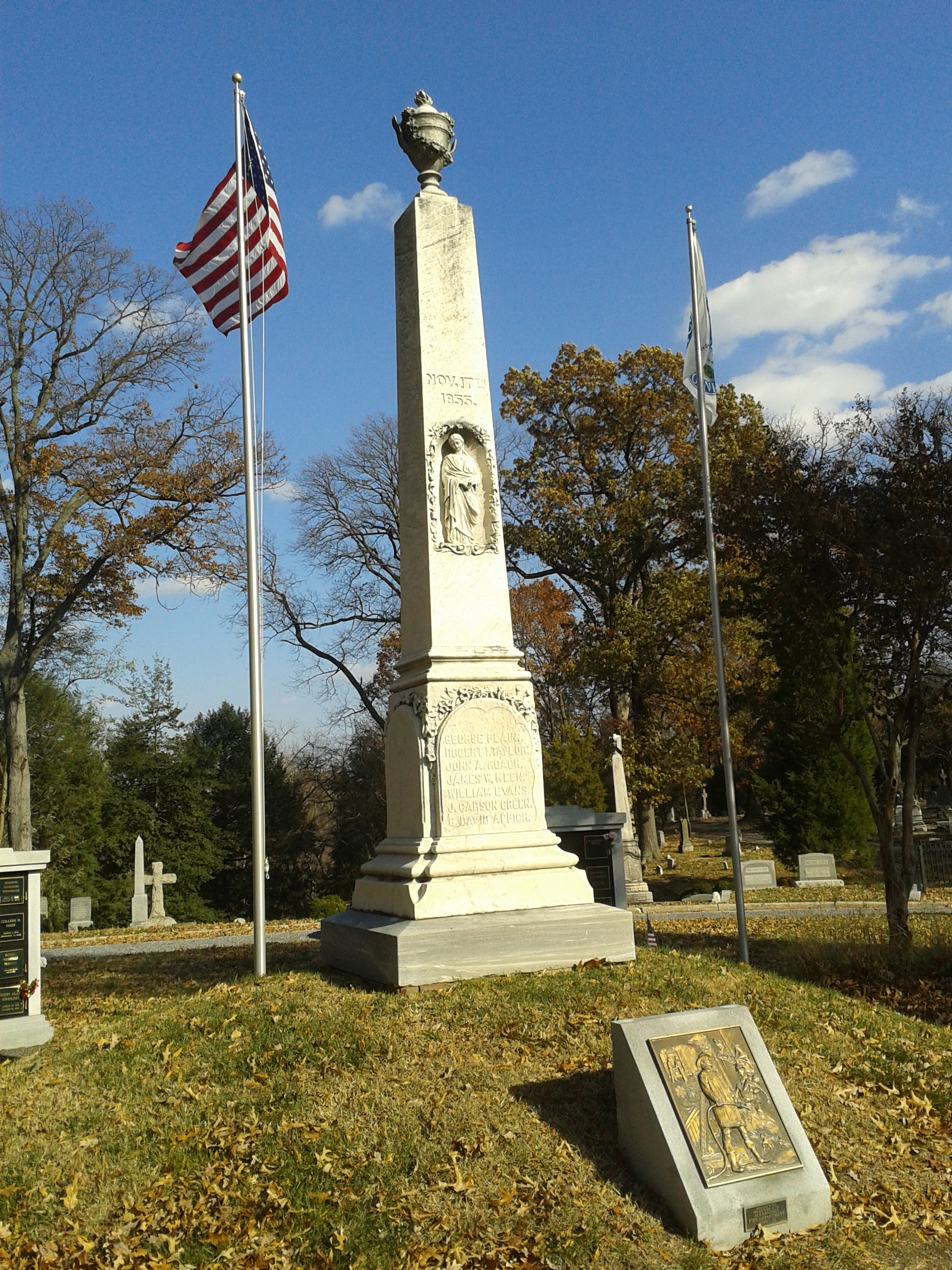
- Interactive map of Ivy Hill Cemetery

Details
- Established: 1856
- Location: Alexandria, Virginia
- Country: United States
- Coordinates: 38°49′03″N 77°04′25″W
- Type: Public
- Size: 22+ acres
- No. of graves: 10,000

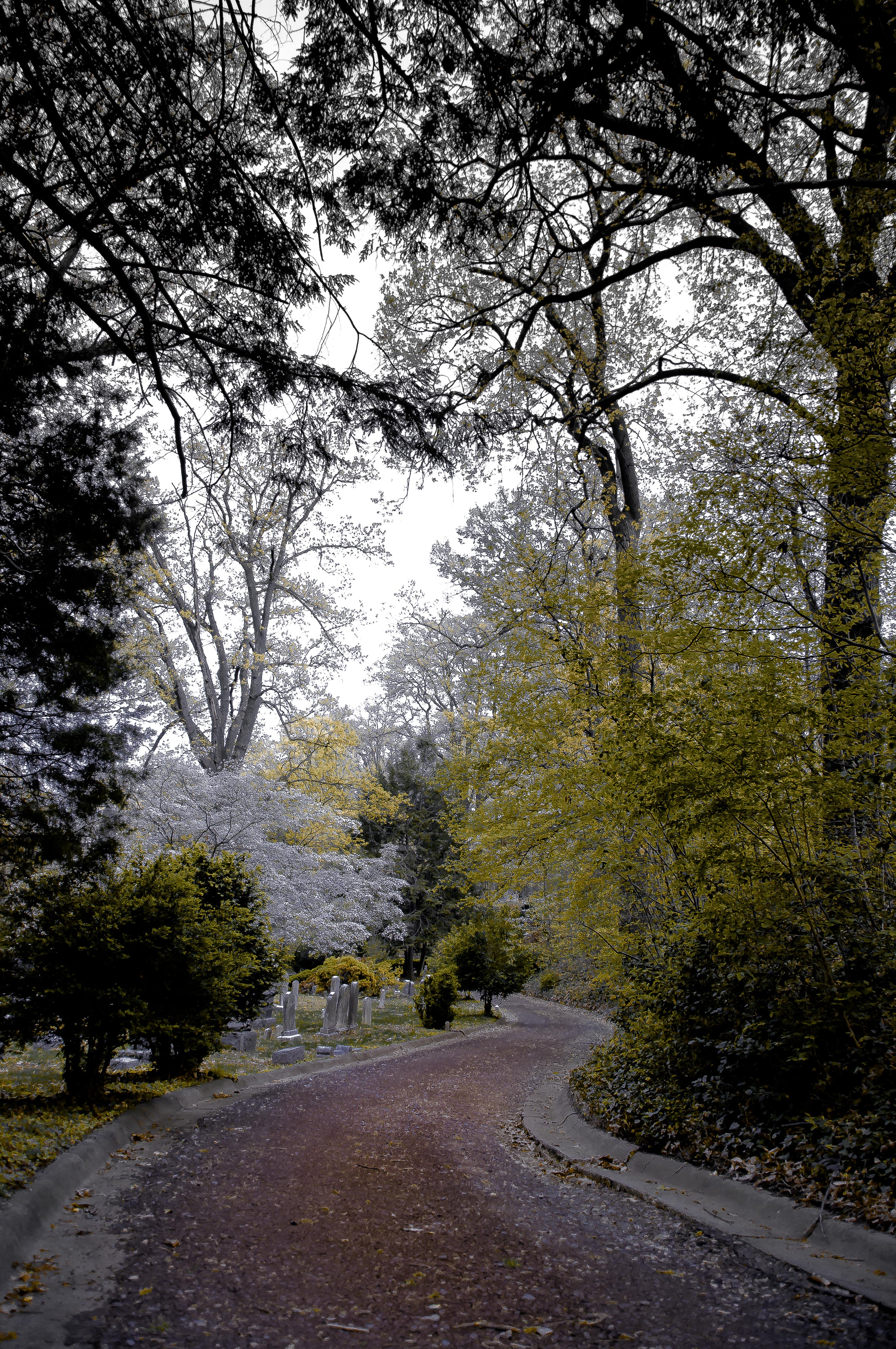
Ivy Hill Cemetery

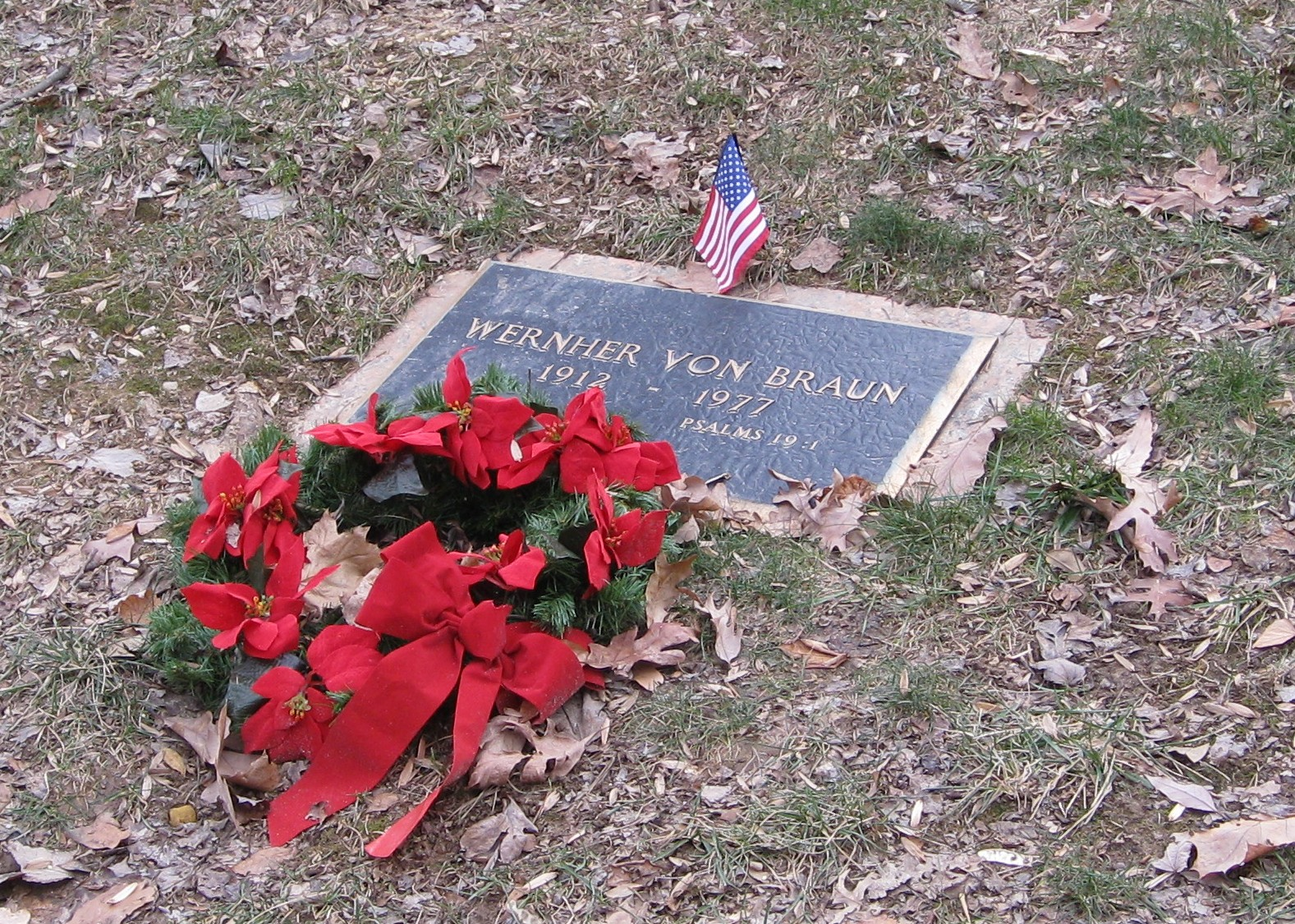
The grave of Nazi rocket scientist and space exploration pioneer Wernher von Braun

Ivy Hill Cemetery is a cemetery in the Rosemont Historic District of the North Ridge neighborhood of Alexandria, Virginia, United States. Burials began at the site in 1837, when it was a family cemetery, and it received a charter as a community cemetery in 1856. The adjoining residential neighborhood was developed beginning in 1908 as a streetcar suburb of Washington, D.C., as trolley lines of the Washington, Alexandria and Mount Vernon railway extended from Alexandria's nearby Union Station (opened 1905). The cemetery is now known for its rare and protected flora and fauna. It was listed on the National Register of Historic Places in 2025.

== Notable burials ==
- Judge Albert Vickers Bryan
- Congressman Charles Creighton Carlin
- Catharine Carter Critcher, painter, daughter of John Critcher
- Congressman John Critcher
- Bryan Fairfax, 8th Lord Fairfax of Cameron
- Charles M. Goodman, acclaimed modernist architect
- Fairfax Harrison, Big railroad magnate
- Vola Lawson, first female city manager of Alexandria
- Lucy Randolph Mason (1882–1959), labor activist and suffragist
- Benjamin Franklin Stringfellow, infamous Confederate spy
- Nicholas Trist
- Wernher von Braun, german major, inventor of missiles, aerospace engineer and space flight pioneer
- Harry H. Vaughan, military aide to President Harry S. Truman
- Amelita Ward
- Descendants of the Washington family, including W. Selden Washington
