= Fenton M. Love =

American politician

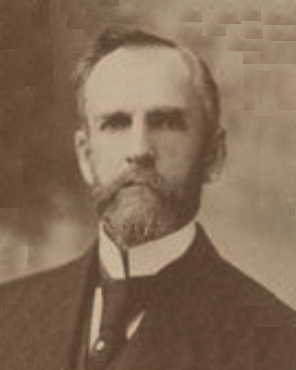
- Official portrait, 1908

Member of the Virginia House of Delegates from Loudoun County
- In office January 10, 1906 – January 12, 1910
- Preceded by: John F. Ryan
- Succeeded by: B. F. Noland

Personal details
- Born: Fenton Mercer Love; June 9, 1853 Hamilton, Virginia, U.S.
- Died: May 13, 1935 (aged 81) Hamilton, Virginia, U.S.
- Party: Democratic
- Spouse: Gertrude Woolf (m. 1881)
- Education: Virginia Tech

Fenton Mercer Love (June 9, 1853 – May 13, 1935) was an American farmer, banker, and politician who served two terms in the Virginia House of Delegates, representing his native Loudoun County.
