= Vola Lawson =

American government worker

Vola Therrell Lawson (September 14, 1934 – December 10, 2013) was an activist and Alexandria, Virginia's first female city manager.

== Early life and education ==
Lawson was born in Atlanta, Georgia. She graduated from George Washington University in Washington, DC.

== Career ==
Lawson began her career with the government of the City of Alexandria as Assistant Director for the Economic Opportunities Commission in 1971. She went on to serve as the city's Director of the Community Development Block Grant Program and Assistant City Manager for housing.

Lawson was appointed Alexandria's Acting City Manager in 1985 and was officially named the City Manager eight months later making her the first woman to hold the position.

Lawson was a civil rights activist and worked to diversify Alexandria's workforce. She was also animal rights activist and helped to establish the city's contract with the Animal Welfare League of Alexandria.

She was inducted into the Virginia Women's Hall of Fame in 1993.

== Death and legacy ==
Lawson died on December 10, 2013. She is buried in Ivy Hill Cemetery in Alexandria.

The Animal Welfare League of Alexandria's animal shelter and the lobby of Alexandria's city hall are named in her memory.
