= John F. Ryan =

American politician

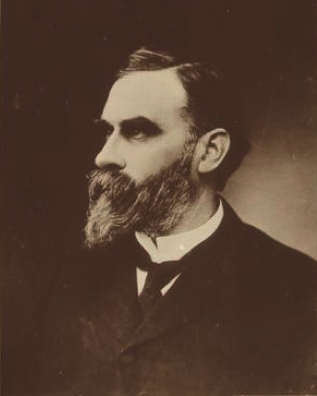

37th Speaker of the Virginia House of Delegates
- In office December 4, 1901 – January 10, 1906
- Preceded by: Edward W. Saunders
- Succeeded by: William D. Cardwell
- In office March 3, 1894 – December 6, 1899
- Preceded by: Richard H. Cardwell
- Succeeded by: Edward W. Saunders

Member of the Virginia House of Delegates from Loudoun County
- In office December 5, 1883 – January 10, 1906
- Preceded by: George E. Plaster
- Succeeded by: Fenton M. Love

Personal details
- Born: John Franklin Ryan; November 9, 1848 Loudoun, Virginia, U.S.
- Died: November 30, 1936 (aged 88) Leesburg, Virginia, U.S.
- Party: Democratic

John Franklin Ryan (November 9, 1848 – November 30, 1936) was a Virginia politician. He represented Loudoun County in the Virginia House of Delegates, and served as that body's Speaker from 1894 until 1899, and again from 1901 until 1906.

Ryan was identified as possibly having been involved in Virginia's Jim Crow-era segregation laws during the naming process for an elementary school in Loudoun County; the school in question was ultimately named Waxpool Elementary School instead.
