= Richard Evelyn Byrd Sr. =

American politician

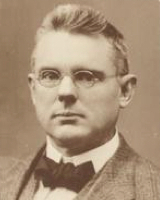

United States Attorney for the Western District of Virginia
- In office 1914–1920
- President: Woodrow Wilson
- Preceded by: Barnes Gillespie
- Succeeded by: Joseph J. Chitwood

40th Speaker of the Virginia House of Delegates
- In office January 8, 1908 – January 14, 1914
- Preceded by: William D. Cardwell
- Succeeded by: Edwin P. Cox

Member of the Virginia House of Delegates for Frederick and Winchester
- In office January 10, 1906 – January 14, 1914
- Preceded by: Edwin C. Jordan II
- Succeeded by: John M. Steck

Personal details
- Born: Richard Evelyn Byrd; August 13, 1860 Austin, Texas, U.S.
- Died: October 23, 1925 (aged 65) Richmond, Virginia, U.S.
- Resting place: Mount Hebron Cemetery
- Party: Democratic
- Spouse: Eleanor Bolling Flood (m. 1886)
- Children: 3, including Harry and Richard Jr.
- Education: University of Virginia (BA); University of Maryland (LLB)
- Profession: Lawyer; politician; newspaper publisher; farmer

Richard Evelyn Byrd Sr. (August 13, 1860 – October 23, 1925) was a Virginia lawyer, politician and newspaperman. He was the father of politician Harry Byrd and aviator Richard Byrd Jr.

== Early and family life ==
He was the first son born to Jennie (Rivers) and her husband William Byrd, who had become an adjutant general of the state of Texas, and born in Austin, Travis County, Texas, months after the American Civil War had begun. After the war, his parents returned to Virginia, and lived with his grandparents. His grandfather and namesake, also Richard E. Byrd (1801-1872), was a politician and by then former slaveholder (the elder Richard E. Byrd owned 26 enslaved people in Frederick County in 1860, and possibly more in neighboring Clarke County). The elder Byrd had been one of the representatives of Frederick, Hampshire, and Morgan counties in the Virginia Constitutional Convention of 1851 and had also served in the Virginia General Assembly. His great grandfather was Thomas Taylor Byrd, who used enslaved labor to work plantations, mostly in what became Clarke County after it was split from Frederick County. His great-great grandfather William Byrd had served in the British army during the American Revolutionary War, then moved to northwestern Virginia. This Richard E. Byrd graduated from the University of Virginia and later received a law degree from the University of Maryland.

This Richard E. Byrd married Eleanor Bolling Flood, also descended from the First Families of Virginia, in Martinsburg, West Virginia, on September 15, 1886. They would have sons Harry Flood Byrd (1887–1966); Richard Evelyn Byrd (1888–1957) and Thomas Bolling Byrd (1890–1968).

== Career ==
Byrd moved to Winchester, Virginia from West Virginia in 1887 and became a wealthy apple grower in the Shenandoah Valley and published the Winchester Star newspaper. He represented Winchester in the Virginia House of Delegates, and served as that body's Speaker from 1908 until 1914. He was the United States Attorney for the Western District of Virginia from 1914 until 1920.he died in 1925

== Legacy ==
One of his sons, Richard, became famous as a naval aviator who led an expedition to the South Pole; another, Harry, would serve as Governor of Virginia and in the United States Senate.
