= Charles E. Stuart (Virginia politician) =

American politician (1850–1889)

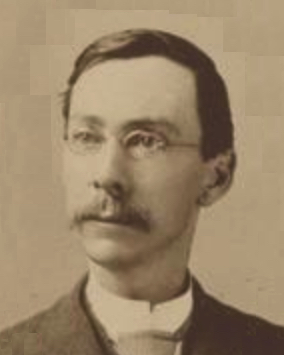
- Portrait of Stuart, c. 1887

35th Speaker of the Virginia House of Delegates
- In office December 5, 1883 – December 8, 1887
- Preceded by: Isaac C. Fowler
- Succeeded by: Richard H. Cardwell

Member of the Virginia House of Delegates for Alexandria City and Alexandria
- In office December 7, 1881 – December 8, 1887
- Preceded by: George A. Mushbach
- Succeeded by: Lawrence W. Corbett

Personal details
- Born: Charles Edward Stuart; May 18, 1850 King George, Virginia, U.S.
- Died: April 16, 1889 (aged 38) Alexandria, Virginia, U.S.
- Party: Democratic
- Spouse: Ruth Yeaton (m. 1876)
- Education: University of Virginia
- Occupation: Lawyer; politician

Charles Edward Stuart (May 18, 1850 – April 16, 1889) was a Virginia politician. He represented Alexandria City and County in the Virginia House of Delegates, and served as that body's Speaker from 1883 until 1887.

== Early life ==
Charles Edward Stuart was born on May 18, 1850, at Panorama in King George County, Virginia, to Roberta (née Lomax) and Charles E. Stuart. His father was a graduate of the University of Virginia and worked as a lawyer.

== Career ==
Stuart worked as a lawyer. He served as a member of the Virginia House of Delegates, representing Alexandria City and County from 1881 to 1887. He was elected as speaker of the House of Delegates twice and served from 1883 to 1887.

He was appointed city judge of Alexandria twice, and was elected on January 18, 1888. He served as judge until his death.

== Personal life ==
Stuart married Ruth Yeaton, daughter of Mary Frances (née duVal) and William Chauncey Yeaton, on October 11, 1876. She was the great granddaughter of Gabriel Duvall. They had five children. At the time of his death, he lived on Washington Street in Alexandria.

Stuart died on April 16, 1889, in Alexandria. He was buried at the Presbyterian Cemetery in Alexandria.
