= Joint Task Force National Capital Region Medical =

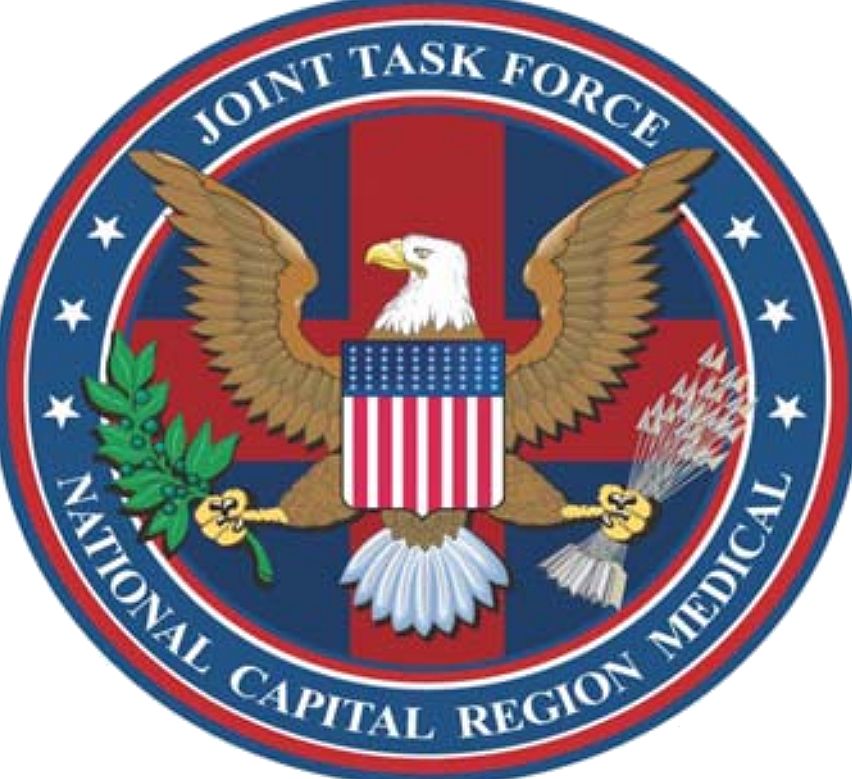
- Joint Task Force National Capital Region Medical; Command Emblem
- Active: September 14, 2007 – September 30, 2013
- Country: United States of America
- Branch: Joint U.S. Army, U.S. Navy and U.S. Air Force
- Type: Joint task force
- Size: 150 (military and civilians)
- Nickname: JTF CapMed
- Motto: "Where the Nation Heals Its Heroes"
- Anniversaries: September 15, 2011 (Official completion of BRAC)

Commanders
- JTF CapMed Commander: Vice Admiral John Mateczun

The Joint Task Force National Capital Region Medical (JTF CapMed), also known as National Capital Region Medical, is located on the Naval Support Activity Bethesda campus in Bethesda, Maryland, and was established by Deputy Secretary of Defense Gordon R. England.

== History ==
=== Establishment ===
Effective September 14, 2007, Deputy Secretary of Defense Gordon England established the JTF CapMed under command of RADM John Mateczun, MC, USN. This joint task force was established to ensure delivery of military healthcare within the National Capital Region (NCR) using all available military healthcare resources and oversee the consolidation and realignment of military healthcare within the joint operating area (JOA) in accordance with the 2005 Base Realignment and Closure (BRAC) Act.

=== Disestablishment ===
Secretary of Defense Ashton Carter directed in his March 11, 2013 "Implementation of Military Health System Governance Reform " memo directed that JTF CapMed be disestablished effective September 30, 2013. As a result of the Reform of the Governance of the Military Health System directed by the National Defense Authorization Act for FY2013, the Defense Health Agency (DHA) was created and JTF CapMed was disestablished and its authority, direction, and control over NCR medical facilities and enhanced MSM authorities were transferred to the DHA NCR Medical Directorate.

== Authority ==
The Commander of the JTF CapMed will act as the senior medical officer in the JOA. The Commander will organize staff and reporting organizations to execute the mission. The Commander shall have the authority to compile budgets for the units assigned to JTF CapMed and distribute and direct resources as needed within the JOA to accomplish mission objectives.

== Leadership ==
From July to September 2013, the acting Commander of JTF CapMed was then–Rear Admiral Raquel C. Bono, who subsequently served as Director, National Capital Region Medical Directorate of the Defense Health Agency from September 2013 to October 2015. Prior to Bono, Army Major General Steve Jones had commanded the task force since March 2012. Prior to Jones, Navy Vice Admiral John Mateczun, MD, served as the first JTF CapMed commander from Sept. 2007 – March 2012.

=== JTF CapMed commanders ===
1. VADM John Mateczun, MC, USN (September 2007 – March 2012)
2. Major General Steve Jones, USA (acting, March 2012 – July 2013)
3. Rear Admiral Raquel C. Bono, MC, USN (acting, July–September 2013)

== BRAC Results ==
BRAC consolidated four NCR inpatient hospitals into two (Walter Reed National Military Medical Center and Fort Belvoir Community Hospital). To date, this was the most complex and largest Base Realignment and Closure project in the history of the Department of Defense. The end result for the combined projects at the Walter Reed National Military Medical Center and Fort Belvoir Community Hospital was $2.8 billion in construction and outfitting of more than 3,000,000 square feet (280,000 m^{2}) of new and renovated medical and administrative space; consolidation of more than 4,400 civilian personnel; relocation of 224 Wounded Warriors and their families; and migration of 9,600 medical staff. In June 2023, the Fort Belvoir Community Hospital name designation was rebranded as Alexander T. Augusta Military Medical Center.

== Integrated Delivery System ==
JTF CapMed working in conjunction with the three Service Commands and the NCR MTFs executed $19.3M installation of an Integrated Healthcare Data Network (JMED) which provides a common desktop and a standardized suite of IT tools for providers across the NCR.

Joint Military Treatment Facilities (MTFs) provide the foundation for the NCR Medical Integrated Delivery System. This is the DoD’s first foray into a multi-service system under a single authority.

== Operations ==
JTF CapMed has both operational and fiscal control over both – WRNMMC & FBCH, as well as tactical control over the 32 medical clinics within the National Capital Region. This pertains to a staff of more than 9,700 and annual operating budget of $1.35B.

== The Future ==
Since the completion of BRAC, new construction and facilities were installed at the renamed Walter Reed National Military Medical Center, and a brand new facility was opened in Fort Belvoir, VA — the Fort Belvoir Community Hospital. In March 2012, Army Major General Steve Jones, became the acting Commander of JTF CapMed, having most recently served as the Deputy Commander for JTF CapMed.

== Constituent commands ==
U.S. Army: Fort Belvoir Community Hospital; Kimbrough Ambulatory Care Center; Dunham U.S. Health Clinic; Barquist Army Health Clinic; Kirk U.S. Army Health Clinic; Fairfax Health Center; Rader Army Health Clinic; DiLorenzo TRICARE Health Clinic; Dumfries Health Center

U.S. Navy: Walter Reed National Military Medical Center; Naval Health Clinic Quantico; Naval Health Clinic Patuxent River; Naval Health Clinic Annapolis; Naval Health Clinic USUHS; Naval Health Clinic Carderock; Naval Health Clinic Lakehurst; Naval Air Facility Health Clinic Andrews; Naval Health Clinic Willow Grove; Naval Health Clinic Mechanicsburg; Naval Health Clinic Dahlgren; Naval Health Clinic Indian Head; Naval Health Clinic Washington Navy Yard; Naval Health Clinic Earle; Naval Health Clinic Sugar Grove; Philadelphia Naval Business Center Health Clinic

U.S. Air Force: Malcolm Grow Medical Center; 79th Medical Wing; Bolling Air Force Base 579th Health Clinic; 11th Medical Group Flight Medicine Clinic

== See also ==
- Joint Task Force – National Capital Region
