= Frank Hume =

American politician

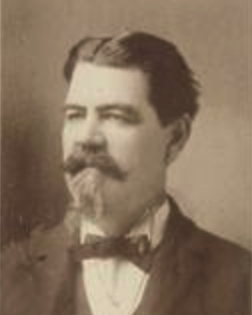
- Portrait of Hume, c. 1900

Member of the Virginia House of Delegates for Alexandria City and Alexandria
- In office December 6, 1899 – December 4, 1901
- Preceded by: Louis C. Barley
- Succeeded by: James R. Caton
- In office December 4, 1889 – December 2, 1891
- Preceded by: Lawrence W. Corbett
- Succeeded by: Charles Bendheim

Personal details
- Born: July 21, 1843 Culpeper, Virginia, U.S.
- Died: July 17, 1906 (aged 62) Washington, D.C., U.S.
- Party: Democratic
- Spouse: Emma Phillips Norris (m. 1870)
- Children: 9

Military service
- Allegiance: Confederate States
- Branch/service: Confederate States Army
- Years of service: 1861–1865
- Battles/wars: American Civil War

Frank Hume (July 21, 1843 – July 17, 1906) was an American politician who served in the Virginia House of Delegates. The Hume School is named for him, and the Frank Hume Memorial Fountain, known as the "whispering wall", at the University of Virginia was built in his honor. In 2022, the memorial’s engraved stones were replaced with plain stone.

During the Civil War, Hume fought with the Volunteer Southrons in the Confederate Army and received a thigh wound at the Battle of Gettysburg. Following the war, he had a clerkship in the Barruch Hall store in Washington, after which he and Richard Poole formed the Poole & Hume business. Hume took full control after Poole became ill, and he continued in charge until he died.

In 1870, Hume married Emma Phipps Norris. They had nine children.
