= Richard R. G. Hobson =

American politician (1931–2021)

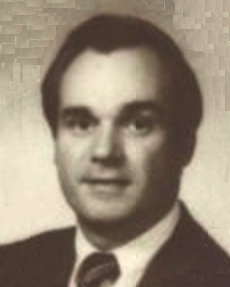

Member of the Virginia House of Delegates from the 21st district
- In office January 14, 1976 – January 9, 1980
- Preceded by: Frank E. Mann
- Succeeded by: Bernard S. Cohen

Personal details
- Born: Richard Rathbone Graham Hobson; July 28, 1931 Orange, New Jersey, U.S.
- Died: May 23, 2021 (aged 89) Alexandria, Virginia, U.S.
- Party: Democratic
- Spouse: Kay
- Education: Princeton University (BA); Harvard University (JD)

Military service
- Allegiance: United States
- Branch/service: United States Navy
- Years of service: 1953–1956

Richard Rathbone Graham Hobson (July 28, 1931 – May 23, 2021) was an American attorney and politician who served two terms in the Virginia House of Delegates before opting to forgo reelection in 1979.
