= Armistead L. Boothe =

American politician (1907–1990)

Armisted L. Boothe

Member of the Virginia Senate from the 36th district
- In office January 8, 1955 – January 7, 1964
- Preceded by: (newly created)
- Succeeded by: Leroy S. Bendheim

Member of the Virginia House of Delegates from Alexandria
- In office January 14, 1948 – January 8, 1955
- Preceded by: W. Selden Washington
- Succeeded by: James M. Thomson

Personal details
- Born: September 23, 1907 Alexandria, Virginia
- Died: February 14, 1990 (aged 82) Falls Church, Virginia
- Party: Democratic
- Spouse: Elizabeth Ravenel Peelle
- Children: 3
- Parent(s): Gardner Lloyd Boothe, Eleanor Harrison Carr Boothe
- Profession: Attorney

Armistead Lloyd Boothe (September 23, 1907 – February 14, 1990) was a Virginia Democratic legislator representing Alexandria, Virginia: first as a delegate in the Virginia General Assembly and later as a State Senator from the newly created 36th District. A lifelong Democrat, Boothe helped lead his party's progressive faction, particularly as they opposed the Byrd Organization's policy of Massive Resistance to racial integration in Virginia's public schools.

== Early life and education ==
Boothe was born in Alexandria, Virginia, on September 23, 1907, to Gardner Lloyd and Eleanor Harrison Carr Boothe. He attended Episcopal High School and graduated from the University of Virginia, receiving his A.B. in 1928. He was chosen as a Rhodes scholar in 1929 and received a B.A. in Jurisprudence from Oxford University in 1931.

In 1934 Boothe married Elizabeth Ravenel Peelle of Washington, D.C., and they ultimately had three daughters, Julie Perry, Eleanor Smith and Elizabeth Davis.

== Legal career ==
Admitted to the Virginia bar in October 1931, Boothe began practicing law with his father, Gardner L. Boothe's Alexandria firm: Boothe, Dudley, Koontz, Blakenship & Stump. He served as a lawyer for the United States Department of Justice from 1934 to 1936, and was Alexandria City Attorney from 1938 to 1943.

Boothe left Alexandria to serve as a naval air combat intelligence officer through the United States Naval Reserve. He served in the Pacific Theater during World War II (1939–1945), then returned to private practice.

== Political career ==
Boothe was elected to his first term in the Virginia House of Delegates (a part-time position) in 1948, and was re-elected until 1955, when he ran for State Senate, also from Alexandria, Virginia. From 1956 to 1963 Boothe served in the State Senate, in newly created (because of census changes) District 36. Boothe was classified as a "militant moderate" or "Young Turk", one of a group challenging the Byrd Organization of conservative, mainly rural Democrats led by U.S. Senator Harry F. Byrd. In 1948, Boothe derailed an attempt by Byrd forces to keep Harry S. Truman off the Presidential ballot in Virginia. In 1950 he introduced bills to create a state civil rights commission and repeal laws segregating transportation.

Boothe is best remembered for his consistent fight to integrate Virginia's public schools, which he began predicting in a Virginia Law Review article published in 1949. Boothe and Stuart B. Carter of rural Fincastle, Virginia, led a group of mostly World War II veterans and from Virginia's growing cities and suburbs, which were forming a progressive wing (or challenging the Byrd Organization). The Young Turks began by securing greater education funding (Virginia had traditionally one of the lowest per capita funding levels in the country, even worse for African Americans). In 1952 they secured Virginia's approval of the Nineteenth Amendment to the United States Constitution, a symbolic gesture since women had been granted the right to vote based on other states' actions. In 1954 the Young Turks deadlocked the General Assembly for hours past its scheduled adjournment, winning a compromise whereby part of the state's surplus revenue would fund additional services rather than dispersing everything as a tax refund (Virginia's taxes also being among the lowest in the country).

After the United States Supreme Court decision in Brown v. Board of Education (and companion cases including one from Prince Edward County, Virginia) in 1954, racial integration became likely. However, when the Supreme Court the following year revisited and reaffirmed Brown I in what became known as Brown II, Southside Virginia and other conservative Byrd Democrats began a program of Massive Resistance to racial integration. They initially appointed a commission under State Senator Garland Gray to study options, but Gray and U.S. Senator Byrd (and others) became radicalized before the commission (of legislators, thus having no African -Americans) issued its report. On January 4, 1956, he and Arlington School Board president Elizabeth Campbell went to Richmond to debate segregation and the Gray plan with Dowell Howard and Henry T. Wickham. When the legislature finally met, it debated the a radicalized version of the Gray Commission plan, which became known as the Stanley Plan. That in part proposed to fund segregation academies through tuition grants, which Boothe opposed. He and Republican state senator Ted Dalton led a "valiant last ditch effort" to insert a "local option" in the Stanley Plan legislative package, beyond the racially segregated "pupil placement" plans, so public schools which complied with judicial desegregation orders would not have to close and deprive all students of education as the Stanley Plan proponents wanted. However, Boothe, Dalton and other moderates failed in that effort; Byrd Democrats proposed such closures despite a provision of the state constitution requiring free public education, proposing instead to modify the state constitution. Moreover, Byrd forces in the state Senate retaliated against Bootheby giving him two minor committee assignments, neither important, which some considered a way of isolating him.

Boothe thus became known for his battle to keep Virginia's public schools, including those in nearby Arlington, Virginia, open in 1958 and 1959 despite Governor Thomas B. Stanley's ordering them to close to avoid integration. Arlington voters had rejected the proposed constitutional amendment, but it passed statewide, so that when federal judge Albert Bryan ordered those schools integrated, the Stanley administration had ousted Campbell and the rest of Arlington's elected school board and imposed the racially segregated pupil placement plan. However, on January 19, 1959 (Robert E. Lee's birthday), both the Virginia Supreme Court and a panel of three federal district court judges in Virginia declared the Stanley Plan unconstitutional. The new governor J. Lindsay Almond initially protested vehemently, but a month later broke with the Byrd Organization and allowed the public schools in Norfolk and Arlington to remain open and integrate peacefully pursuant to federal court orders. Boothe handily won reelection in 1959 despite a primary challenge for allowing such integration (as did segregationist James Thomson, who had succeeded him as Alexandria's delegate). Thus, Massive Resistance did not end for several more years.

A lifelong Democrat, Boothe sat on the Virginia Code Commission throughout his legislative service. He also supported the Kennedy-Johnson campaign in Virginia in 1960. In 1961 Boothe made an unsuccessful bid for Lieutenant Governor of Virginia on a ticket with Democratic candidates A. E. S. Stephens (lieutenant governor running for Governor) and T. Munford Boyd (running for attorney general). The Byrd Organization candidates, however, defeated them in the Democratic primary (Boothe losing to Mills E. Godwin 46% to 54%, the narrowest margin of any of the progressive candidates) and ultimately won election in November. Boothe declined to seek re-election in 1963, and was succeeded by Leroy S. Bendheim.

When Senator Byrd announced his retirement from the United States Senate (and died several months later), Boothe ran for the seat, proclaiming a progressive agenda, including diplomatic recognition of China. However, he lost the 1966 Democratic primary to Byrd's son, Harry F. Byrd Jr. (whom, ironically, Boothe had met during their mutual naval service in World War II), by a very small margin (less than 1%, or 8,225 votes statewide).

After that loss, Boothe retired from the electoral arena, although he remained politically active until ultimately sidelined by Alzheimer's disease. Boothe headed Robert F. Kennedy's 1968 Presidential campaign in Virginia. The following year, Boothe survived major heart surgery, and concluded his legal career. Boothe spent his final years before retiring to an assisted living facility as Director of Development for and as assistant to the dean of the Virginia Theological Seminary in Alexandria.

== Death and legacy ==
Boothe died in Falls Church, Virginia, in February 1990, and was interred at the Virginia Theological Seminary.

The City of Alexandria named a newly created park in the Cameron Station subdivision after Armistead Boothe in 1999. The Albert and Shirley Small Special Collections Library at the University of Virginia has his papers.

A collection of Boothe’s donated materials is housed at the George Mason University Special Collections Research Center.

Virginia House of Delegates
Preceded by W. Selden Washington	Representing Alexandria, Virginia; 1948–55	Succeeded by James McIlhany Thomson
Senate of Virginia
Preceded by newly created district	Virginia Senate, District 36; 1956 - 1962	Succeeded by Leroy S. Bendheim
