= Marshall J. Beverley =

American mayor

Mayor of Alexandria, Virginia
- In office July 1, 1951 – July 1, 1955
- Preceded by: Franklin P. Backus
- Succeeded by: Leroy S. Bendheim

Personal details
- Born: August 26, 1911 Alexandria, Virginia
- Died: June 14, 2000 (aged 88) Martinsburg, West Virginia
- Party: Democratic

Marshall Jones Beverley (August 26, 1911 – June 14, 2000) was a banker and mayor of Alexandria, Virginia in the 1950s.

== Early life and family ==
Beverley was born on August 26, 1911, in Alexandria, Virginia. The son of Richard H. Carter Beverley, Sr., and Elizabeth Winter Jones, Beverley was a cousin of long-time Virginia Senator Harry F. Byrd, Sr. He was a banker with the Washington, DC–based Riggs National Bank from 1929 to 1935 and then joined Alexandria's Burke and Herbert Bank.

Beverley entered the military in 1938 as a member of the U.S. Naval Reserve and was commissioned an officer in the U.S. Navy on December 10, 1941. A veteran of World War II, he left the service with the rank of lieutenant commander.

In 1947, Beverley married Janet deNeale English; they had four children: Janet deNeale Beverley, Barbara Beverley, Marshall J. Beverley, Jr., and Richard Byrd Beverley.

== Political service ==
Beverley was elected as a member of the Alexandria City Council in 1949 and was elected mayor as a Democrat from 1951 to 1955.

He was named to the Board of Visitors of Mount Vernon in 1964 and served on the board until 1995.

== Later life and death ==
Beverley served as a federal bank examiner for the Federal Reserve Bank and later retired as Senior Vice President of United Virginia Bank in 1976. The Beverleys retired to Berkeley County, West Virginia, and he died in Martinsburg, West Virginia, in 2000.

Political offices
| Preceded by Franklin P. Backus | Mayor of the City of Alexandria, Virginia; 1951–1955 | Succeeded by Leroy S. Bendheim |
