= Bob Calhoun =

American politician (1937–2020)

Member of the Virginia Senate from the 30th district
- In office December 12, 1988 – January 10, 1996
- Preceded by: Wiley F. Mitchell
- Succeeded by: Patsy Ticer

Personal details
- Born: Robert Lathan Calhoun; July 22, 1937 Oak Park, Illinois, U.S.
- Died: August 6, 2020 (aged 83) Berryville, Virginia, U.S.
- Party: Republican
- Education: Tufts University (BA); Yale University (MA, LLB)
- Profession: Lawyer; politician

Robert Lathan Calhoun (July 22, 1937 – August 6, 2020) was a lawyer in Alexandria, Virginia, who served as a Republican member of the Alexandria City Council and the Senate of Virginia.

== Early life and education ==
Calhoun was born in Oak Park, Illinois on July 22, 1937. He graduated from Tufts University in 1959 and Yale Law School in 1963.

== Political career ==
In 1975, Calhoun was elected to the Alexandria City Council on the Republican ticket, serving two three-year terms. In 1984, he ran again for a vacant seat on the city council and served until December 12, 1988, when he was elected in a special election to the Virginia Senate, representing the 30th Senate District, which included most of Alexandria and some precincts in Fairfax County, Virginia. He served one partial and one full term in the Senate before being defeated by the mayor of Alexandria, Democrat Patsy Ticer, in 1995.

He was selected as a director of the Metropolitan Washington Airports Authority, serving from 1997 to 2003. He practiced law in Alexandria, Virginia.

== Death ==
On August 6, 2020, Calhoun died of prostate cancer in Berryville, Virginia, at age 83.

Senate of Virginia
Preceded by Wiley F. Mitchell Jr.	Virginia Senator for the 30th District; 1988–1996	Succeeded by Patsy S. Ticer
