= Virginia's 30th Senate district =

American legislative district

Virginia's 30th State Senate district
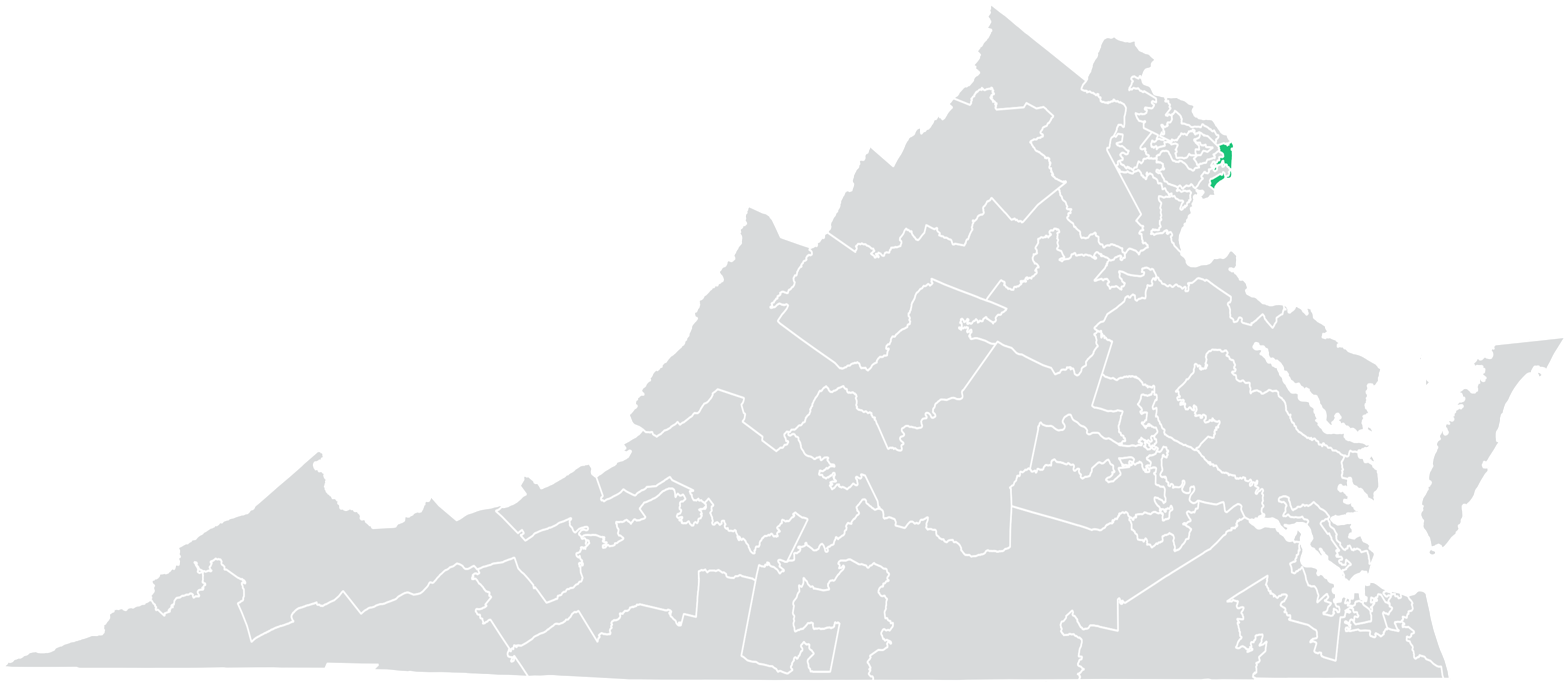
Senator
Danica Roem; D–Manassas
- Demographics: 59% White; 12% Black; 17% Hispanic; 8% Asian; 4% Other
- Population (2019): 221,863
- Registered voters: 153,062

Virginia's 30th Senate district is one of 40 districts in the Senate of Virginia. It has been represented by Democrat Danica Roem since 2024.

== Geography ==
District 30 is located in northern Virginia, particularly in the Greater Washington Metropolitan area, and includes portions of the County of Prince William. The independent cities that are part of district 30 include Manassas and Manassas Park.

The district is located entirely within Virginia's 10th congressional district, and overlaps with the 20th, 21st, and 22nd districts of the Virginia House of Delegates.

== Recent election results ==
=== 2023 ===
2023 Virginia Senate election, District 30
Primary election
Party	Candidate	Votes	%
Republican	William Carroll Woolf	4,998	70.2
Republican	Robert Ruffolo	2,120	29.8
Total votes		7,118	100
General election
Democratic	Danica Roem (incumbent)	29,713	51.5
Republican	William Carroll Woolf	27,794	48.2
	Other/Write-in votes	178	0.3
Total votes		57,685	100
Democratic hold			

== Prior to 2021 redistricting ==
=== 2019 ===
2019 Virginia Senate election, District 30
Party	Candidate	Votes	%
Democratic	Adam Ebbin (incumbent)	42,850	91.8
Total votes		46,702	100
Democratic hold			

=== 2015 ===
2015 Virginia Senate election, District 30
Party	Candidate	Votes	%
Democratic	Adam Ebbin (incumbent)	27,274	76.7
Independent Greens	J. Ron Fisher	7,431	20.9
Total votes		35,547	100
Democratic hold			

=== 2011 ===
2011 Virginia Senate election, District 30
Primary election
Party	Candidate	Votes	%
Democratic	Adam Ebbin	4,570	38.8
Democratic	Rob Krupicka	4,235	35.9
Democratic	Libby Garvey	2,980	25.3
Total votes		11,791	100
General election
Democratic	Adam Ebbin	20,968	64.7
Republican	Timothy Thomas Christensen McGhee	11,349	35.0
Total votes		32,419	100
Democratic hold			

=== Federal and statewide results ===
Year	Office	Results
2021	Governor	McAuliffe 75.1–24.1%
2020	President	Biden 75.6–22.6%
2017	Governor	Northam 74.8–24.4%
2016	President	Clinton 72.9–21.1%
2014	Senate	Warner 65.6–32.2%
2013	Governor	McAuliffe 67.1–27.4%
2012	President	Obama 66.3–32.6%
2012	Senate	Kaine 68.2–31.8%

== Prior to 2011 redistricting ==
All election results below took place prior to 2011 redistricting, and thus were under different district lines.

=== 2007 ===
2007 Virginia Senate election, District 30
Party	Candidate	Votes	%
Democratic	Patsy Ticer (incumbent)	20,853	95.2
Total votes		21,904	100
Democratic hold			

=== 2003 ===
2003 Virginia Senate election, District 30
Party	Candidate	Votes	%
Democratic	Patsy Ticer (incumbent)	18,633	95.4
Total votes		19,536	100
Democratic hold			

=== 1999 ===
1999 Virginia Senate election, District 30
Party	Candidate	Votes	%
Democratic	Patsy Ticer (incumbent)	17,846	80.8
Independent	C. W. Levy	3,938	17.8
Total votes		22,079	100
Democratic hold			

=== 1995 ===
1995 Virginia Senate election, District 30
Party	Candidate	Votes	%
Democratic	Patsy Ticer	18,897	57.6
Republican	Bob Calhoun (incumbent)	13,868	42.3
Total votes		32,788	100
Democratic gain from Republican			

== District officeholders ==
Years	Senator, District 30	Counties/cities in district
1940–1944	Robert O. Norris, Jr. (D)	King George County, Lancaster County, Northumberland County, Richmond County, Westmoreland County.
1944–1948	Robert O. Norris, Jr. (D)	King George County, Lancaster County, Northumberland County, Richmond County, Westmoreland County.
1948–1952	Robert O. Norris, Jr. (D)	King George County, Lancaster County, Northumberland County, Richmond County, Westmoreland County.
1952–1956	Robert O. Norris, Jr. (D)	King George County, Lancaster County, Northumberland County, Richmond County, Westmoreland County.
1956–1960	Thomas H. Blanton (D)	Caroline County, Hanover County, King William County, Essex County, King and Queen County, Middlesex County.
1960–1964	Thomas H. Blanton (D)	Caroline County, Hanover County, King William County, Essex County, King and Queen County, Middlesex County.
1964–1968	Fred W. Bateman (D)	York County and the City of Newport News.
1968–1970	Edward E. Willey (D) and J. Sargeant Reynolds (D) (multimember district)	City of Richmond.
1970–1972	Edward E. Willey (D) and Douglas Wilder (D) (multimember district)	City of Richmond.
1972–1976	Leroy S. Bendheim (D)	City of Alexandria.
1976–1980	Wiley F. Mitchell (R)	City of Alexandria.
1980–1984	Wiley F. Mitchell (R)	City of Alexandria.
1984–1988	Wiley F. Mitchell (R)	City of Alexandria.
1988–1992	Wiley F. Mitchell (R); Bob Calhoun (R)	City of Alexandria.
1992–1996	Bob Calhoun (R)	City of Alexandria (part), Fairfax County (part).
1996–2000	Patsy Ticer (D)	City of Alexandria (part), Fairfax County (part).
2000–2004	Patsy Ticer (D)	City of Alexandria (part), Fairfax County (part).
2004–2008	Patsy Ticer (D)	City of Alexandria (part), Fairfax County (part).
2008–2012	Patsy Ticer (D)	City of Alexandria (part), Fairfax County (part).
2012–2016	Adam Ebbin (D)	Arlington County (part), Fairfax County (part), City of Alexandria (part).
2016–2020	Adam Ebbin (D)	Arlington County (part), Fairfax County (part), City of Alexandria (part).
2020–2024	Adam Ebbin (D)	Arlington County (part), Fairfax County (part), City of Alexandria (part).
2024–present	Danica Roem (D)	Prince William County (part), City of Manassas, City of Manassas Park.
