= Wiley F. Mitchell =

American politician (born 1932)

Wiley F. Mitchell Jr.
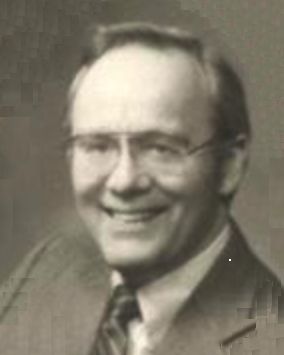

Member of the Virginia Senate from the 30th district
- In office January 14, 1976 – December 12, 1988
- Preceded by: Leroy S. Bendheim
- Succeeded by: Bob Calhoun

Personal details
- Born: Wiley Francis Mitchell Jr. April 23, 1932 (age 94) Youngsville, North Carolina, United States
- Party: Republican
- Spouse: Marshalé Moody (m. 1953)
- Education: Wake Forest University (BA, JD)
- Occupation: Lawyer; politician

Wiley Francis Mitchell Jr. (born April 23, 1932) is a lawyer and former politician in Virginia.

== Early life and education ==
A native of North Carolina, Mitchell graduated from Wake Forest University with a bachelor's degree in 1952 and in 1954 graduated from Wake Forest Law School.

== Political career ==
Mitchell was elected a member of the Alexandria City Council, serving from 1967 to 1976 as a Republican. He received the most votes for city council and was Vice-Mayor from 1972 to 1975. In 1975, he was the Republican nominee in Senate District 30 and defeated incumbent Leroy S. Bendheim. In the Virginia Senate, Mitchell served as Minority Floor Leader from 1984 to 88. In 1988, Mitchell resigned his seat to be the Senior General Counsel for Norfolk Southern Corporation.

== Private practice ==
While serving as General Counsel at Norfolk Southern, Mitchell was also president of the National Association of Railroad Trial Counsel. Today he is in private practice in Norfolk, Virginia and holds leadership positions as board member of The Nature Conservancy of Virginia, the Virginia Beach Foundation, and the Sorensen Institute of the University of Virginia, Trustee of the Virginia Aquarium and Marine Science Center, a member of the Regional Board of the Hampton Roads Chamber of Commerce, and a member of the Virginia Senate Ethics Advisory Panel. Mitchell also serves as a board member of Virginians for High Speed Rail and as a trustee of the Virginia Rail Policy Institute. He is a former board member of the Virginia Chamber of Commerce and was for many years chairman of the Chamber's Government Affairs Committee.

Senate of Virginia
Preceded by Leroy S. Bendheim	Virginia Senate, District 30; 1976 - 1988	Succeeded by Bob Calhoun
