= Richard H. Cardwell =

American judge (1845–1931)

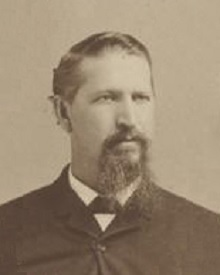
- Cardwell in 1887

Justice of the Supreme Court of Virginia
- In office January 1, 1895 – November 16, 1916
- Preceded by: Drury A. Hinton
- Succeeded by: Robert R. Prentis

36th Speaker of the Virginia House of Delegates
- In office December 8, 1887 – March 3, 1894
- Preceded by: Charles E. Stuart
- Succeeded by: John F. Ryan

Member of the Virginia House of Delegates from Hanover County
- In office December 7, 1881 – January 1, 1895
- Preceded by: Henry T. Wickham
- Succeeded by: Bickerton L. Winston

Personal details
- Born: Richard Henry Cardwell; August 1, 1845 Madison, North Carolina, U.S.
- Died: March 19, 1931 (aged 85) Ashland, Virginia, U.S.
- Resting place: Woodlawn Cemetery; Ashland, Virginia, U.S.
- Party: Democratic
- Spouse: Kate Howard
- Children: William D. Cardwell

Military service
- Allegiance: Confederate States
- Branch/service: Confederate States Army
- Years of service: 1863–1865
- Unit: 45th North Carolina Infantry
- Battles/wars: American Civil War

Richard Henry Cardwell (August 1, 1845 – March 19, 1931) was an American politician and jurist. He was Speaker of the Virginia House of Delegates 1887–1895, and a justice of the state Supreme Court of Appeals 1895–1916.

== Early life ==
Cardwell was born in Madison, North Carolina. His father, Richard Perrin Caldwell, died when he was an infant, and he had great difficulty in obtaining an education. As a youth, he attended public school and worked on the family farm in the summer and fall. He attended, for brief sessions, the Beulah Male Institute and the Madison Male Academy.

== Career ==
In 1863, he became a private soldier in a North Carolina company of the Confederate Army and served until the end of the war. He then returned to his home but, in 1869, moved to Hanover County, Virginia, and, four years later, to Doswell, Virginia, where he lived for two years. Because he was devoted to the study of law, he carried on his education by studying at night and, for a while, in the office of Samuel C. Redd. He was admitted to the bar in 1874 and began practice in Richmond.

From 1881 to 1895, he was a member of the Virginia House of Delegates from Hanover County, serving as Speaker from 1887 onward. In 1894 he was elected to the Supreme Court of Appeals. He was made president of the court on June 12, 1916, but resigned on November 6, 1916.

== Personal life ==
Cardwell died at his home, Prospect Hill, on March 19, 1931, and was interred at Woodlawn Cemetery in Ashland, Virginia. His son, William D. Cardwell, was Speaker of the House of Delegates from 1906 to 1908.

== Notes and references ==
Jamerson, Bruce F., Clerk of the House of Delegates, supervising (2007). Speakers and Clerks of the Virginia House of Delegates, 1776-2007. Richmond, Virginia: Virginia House of Delegates.
