= Charles E. Beatley =

American politician (1916–2003)

Mayor of Alexandria, Virginia
- In office July 1, 1967 – July 1, 1976
- Preceded by: Frank E. Mann
- Succeeded by: Frank E. Mann
- In office July 1, 1979 – July 1, 1985
- Preceded by: Frank E. Mann
- Succeeded by: Jim Moran

Personal details
- Born: May 17, 1916 Urbana, Illinois
- Died: December 29, 2003 (aged 87) Alexandria, Virginia
- Party: Democratic
- Education: Ohio State University

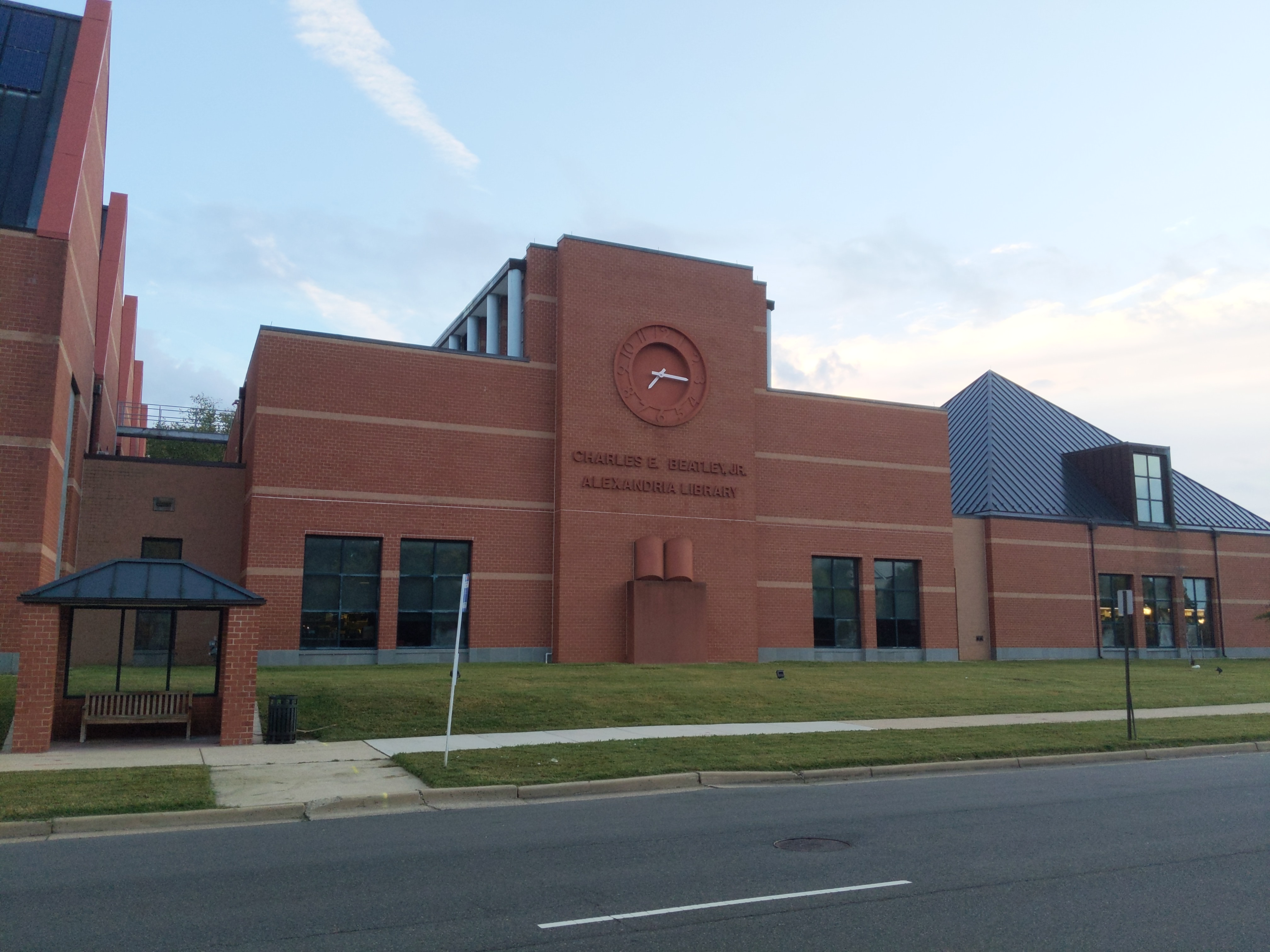
Charles E. Beatley, Jr. Central Library

Charles E. Beatley, Jr. (May 17, 1916 – December 29, 2003) was an American politician who was the mayor of Alexandria, Virginia.

== Biography ==
A native of Ohio, Beatley earned his undergraduate degree in economics from Ohio State University in 1938, and received his master's degree in business administration in 1947 from the same institution. As a civilian pilot, he flew for Pan American-Grace Airways between college degrees. He also ferried military planes to overseas bases as a civilian pilot during World War II.

Elected to the Alexandria City Council in 1966 as a Democrat, Beatley became mayor the following year, and served until 1976, when he was defeated by former Virginia delegate Frank E. Mann, who ran as an Independent. After retiring from United Airlines, Beatley ran again for mayor at the urging of local Republicans and Democrats, was elected in a landslide, and served until 1985. Beatley became known for preserving Alexandria's historic heritage while revitalizing its business district, as well as for promoting both local and regional public transportation as a board member of the Washington Metropolitan Area Transit Authority.

He lost reelection by 2,000 votes in 1985 to Jim Moran, who would later serve as a member of congress representing the surrounding area. One of his aides, Del Pepper, won election to the city council in 1985 and served for 36 years until 2021.

The Charles E. Beatley, Jr. Central Library of the Alexandria library system and the nearby Charles Beatley Bridge (which crosses Holmes Run) in Alexandria are named in his honor.

Political offices
Preceded by Frank E. Mann	Mayor of the City of Alexandria, Virginia; 1967–1976	Succeeded by Frank E. Mann
Preceded by Frank E. Mann	Mayor of the City of Alexandria, Virginia; 1979–1985	Succeeded by Jim Moran
