= W. Selden Washington =

American politician from Virginia (1889–1953)

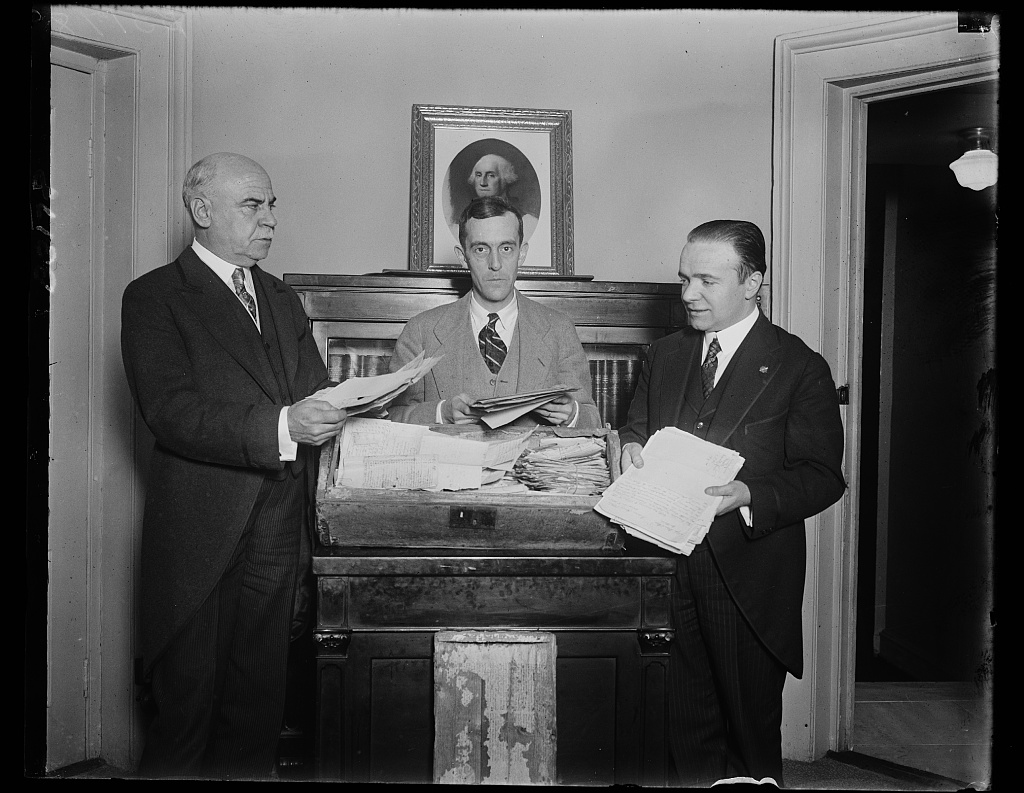
- Washington with William Tyler Page (left) and Henry Woodhouse (right) in 1929.

Member of the Virginia House of Delegates for Alexandria
- In office January 12, 1944 – January 13, 1948
- Preceded by: Maurice D. Rosenberg
- Succeeded by: Armistead L. Boothe

Personal details
- Born: September 13, 1889 Marshall, Fauquier County, Virginia, US
- Died: July 21, 1953 (aged 63) Alexandria, Virginia, US
- Resting place: Ivy Hill Cemetery, Alexandria, Virginia
- Party: Democrat
- Spouse: Irene Watkins Tinley
- Children: 2
- Education: Bliss Electrical School
- Occupation: realtor, officer, politician

Military service
- Allegiance: United States of America
- Branch/service: United States Army
- Years of service: 1917–1918
- Rank: 2nd Lieutenant
- Unit: Coast Artillery Corps
- Battles/wars: World War I

Wilson Selden Washington (September 13, 1889 – July 21, 1953) was an American politician and realtor. He was a Democratic member of the Virginia House of Delegates.

== Early life and education ==
Washington was born on September 13, 1889, in Marshall in Fauquier County, Virginia, to Lawrence Washington and Frances Lackland. He was descended from John Augustine Washington, the brother of President George Washington.

The family moved to Alexandria during his childhood. Washington attended the Alexandria Public Schools, then the Bliss Electrical School in Washington, D.C. During World War I, Washington enlisted in June 1917 in the United States Army Coast Artillery Corps; he was commissioned a 2nd Lieutenant in November 1918.

Washington married Irene Watkins Tinsley in 1920. They had two children, Wilson Selden Washington, Jr. and Nancy James Washington.

== Career and politics ==
Washington was a member of Grace Episcopal Church in Alexandria, as well as the local Rotary Club. A Freemason, he served as Master of Alexandria-Washington Lodge No. 22. He was also a member of Army Navy Country Club and the Boy Scouts of America and served as President of the Alexandria-Arlington-Fairfax Real Estate Board as well as the Northern Virginia Underwriters Association.

In 1943, Washington was elected to the House of Delegates representing Alexandria and won re-election, serving two terms, succeeded by Armistead L. Boothe.

== Death ==
Washington died on July 21, 1953, in Alexandria. He is buried at Ivy Hill Cemetery in Alexandria.

Virginia House of Delegates
Preceded by Maurice D. Rosenberg	Representing Alexandria, Virginia; 1944–1948	Succeeded by Armistead L. Boothe
