= Marion Galland =

American politician

Marion Gibbs Galland

Member of the Virginia House of Delegates from Alexandria
- In office 1964 – January 1970 Serving with James M. Thomson
- Succeeded by: Frank E. Mann

Personal details
- Born: November 18, 1913 Montvale, New Jersey, U.S.
- Died: August 5, 2007 (aged 93) Alexandria, Virginia, U.S.
- Party: Democratic
- Spouse: George F. Galland
- Education: Barnard College

Marion Gibbs Galland (November 18, 1913 – August 5, 2007) was an American civic activist, housewife and Democratic politician who became the first woman to represent Alexandria, Virginia in the Virginia General Assembly. Elected in 1963, she served three consecutive terms in the Virginia House of Delegates, from 1964 to 1970.

== Early and family life ==
Born in Montvale, New Jersey, Marion Gibbs attended Vassar College then Barnard College from which she graduated in 1936. She married George Galland, and they had children who survived them.

== Career ==
In 1964, Marion Galland joined Kathryn H. Stone and Dorothy Shoemaker McDiarmid, both also from northern Virginia, in the Virginia General Assembly. Northern Virginia delegates had litigated the voting apportionment case Davis v. Mann, and the United States Supreme Court ruled in their favor in 1964. In the subsequent reapportionment, Alexandria gained a seat, so Galland served alongside conservative James M. Thomson, whose father-in-law was U.S. Senator Harry F. Byrd, one of the principal architects of Massive Resistance against the Supreme Court's school desegregation decision in Brown v. Board of Education.

Described as a "four foot, 11-inch dynamo" who "probably weighed less than 95 pounds soaking wet," by a later successor, state senator Patsy Ticer, Galland was active in the League of Women Voters and Association of American University Women, and later became the first President of Alexandria Senior Services (1968) and of the Alexandria Community Y (which became the Campagna Center)(1971–74). She also served on the boards of trustees of the Alexandria Mental Hygiene Clinic, Alexandria Community Health Center, Virginia Mental Health Association, Alexandria Health and Welfare Council and the Washington Area Health and Welfare Council, as well as the Democratic State Central Committee. Galland was also active in the Alexandria Parent Teacher Association, St. Paul's Episcopal Church, Church Women United, the Business and Professional Women's Club, WETA, Planned Parenthood, the Hunting Creek Garden Club, the Salvation Army Auxiliary, Urban League, Association for Childhood Education, the Northern Virginia Association for Retarded Children, Human Relations council, Washington Area United Givers Fund, Alexandria Red Cross, and the National Symphony Women's Committee.

== Death and legacy ==
Galland spent her final years in Goodwin House, where she had previously volunteered, and died on August 5, 2007. Her family requested that rather than flowers, donations be made to the Campagna Center, the successor to organizations she had helped found.

Virginia House of Delegates
| Preceded by | Virginia Delegate for Arlington; 1954–1966 | Succeeded by |
