= Alexander T. Augusta Military Medical Center =

Hospital in Virginia, United States

- National Capital Region Medical Directorate
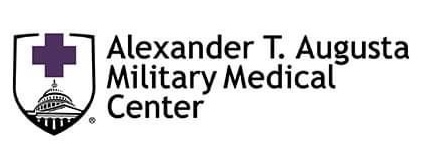

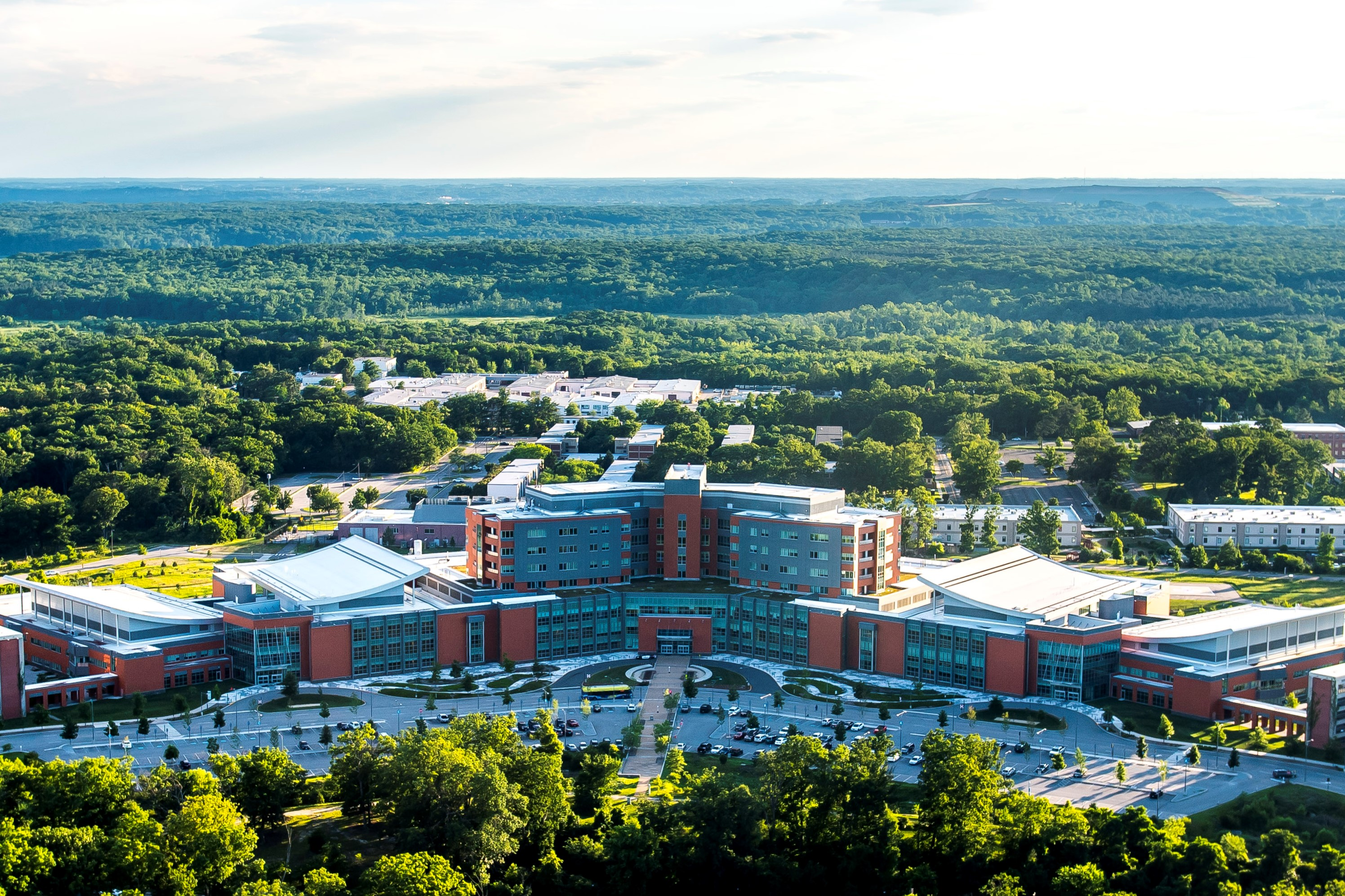
- Augusta Military Medical Center main facility

Geography
- Location: 9300 Dewitt Loop, Fort Belvoir, Fairfax County, Virginia, U.S.
- Coordinates: 38°42′19.194″N 77°8′33.328″W

Organisation
- Care system: Tricare
- Type: Military hospital
- Affiliated university: Uniformed Services University of the Health Sciences

Services
- Emergency department: III
- Beds: 120

Helipads
- Helipad: IATA: VG93
Number	Length		Surface
Number	ft	m	Surface
H1	50	15	Concrete

History
- Former name: Fort Belvoir Community Hospital
- Constructed: November 9, 2007
- Opened: August 31, 2011; 14 years ago

Links
- Website: atammc.tricare.mil
- Lists: Hospitals in U.S.
Troop Command – Alexander T. Augusta Military Medical Center
- Active: 2011 - present
- Country: United States
- Branch: United States Army
- Type: Hospital
- Part of: Defense Health Agency
- Headquarters: Fort Belvoir, Virginia
- Nickname: ATAMMC
- Mottos: "Where evidence-based design meets patient- and family-centered care in a culture of excellence"
Commanders
- Director: COL Kathy Spangler, USA
- Sr. Enlisted Leader: CSM Dedraf Blash, USA

The Alexander T. Augusta Military Medical Center is a United States Department of Defense medical facility located on Fort Belvoir, Virginia, outside of Washington D.C. In conjunction with Walter Reed National Military Medical Center, the hospital provides the Military Health System medical capabilities of the National Capital Region Medical Directorate (NCR MD), a joint unit providing comprehensive care to members of the United States Armed Forces located in the capital area, and their families.

Previously known as the Fort Belvoir Community Hospital, the facility is located on an Army installation, but operates as one of the first joint service medical facilities in the U.S. military, staffed with uniformed medical personnel from the Army, Navy, and Air Force. The hospital is one of the largest in Northern Virginia, and provides all levels of inpatient and outpatient medical care. The facility maintains a 24-hour emergency department and level III trauma center, but, like most U.S. military hospitals, transfers patients in need of higher care to equipped civilian medical facilities. As part of federal emergency planning in the National Capitol Region, the hospital is also tasked with maintaining unique capabilities to support continuity of government in the event of crisis.

The $1.03 billion, 1.3 million-square-foot facility opened in August 2011, replacing Fort Belvoir's existing medical facility, DeWitt Army Community Hospital, and integrating nearly half of the workforce of the former Walter Reed Army Medical Center in Washington, D.C., in accordance with 2005 Base Realignment and Closure Act. In addition to its primary facility at Fort Belvoir, the hospital also operates the DiLorenzo TRICARE Health Clinic (DTHC) at the Pentagon and satellite health centers in Fairfax and Dumfries, Virginia.

== History ==
The former DeWitt Army Community Hospital was named in honor of Brigadier General Wallace DeWitt Sr., (1878–1949), a surgeon who served in both World War I and II.

The DeWitt Army Community Hospital opened in 1957, having cost $4.5 million to construct. It was the second of nine hospitals planned by the Army during the building program following the Korean War.

DeWitt was a 46-bed Joint Commission-accredited facility and the only military inpatient facility in Northern Virginia. It was the center of the DeWitt Health Care Network, which featured the Andrew Rader Army Health Clinic at Fort Myer, Fort A.P. Hill, and the Family Health Centers of Woodbridge and Fairfax in Virginia.

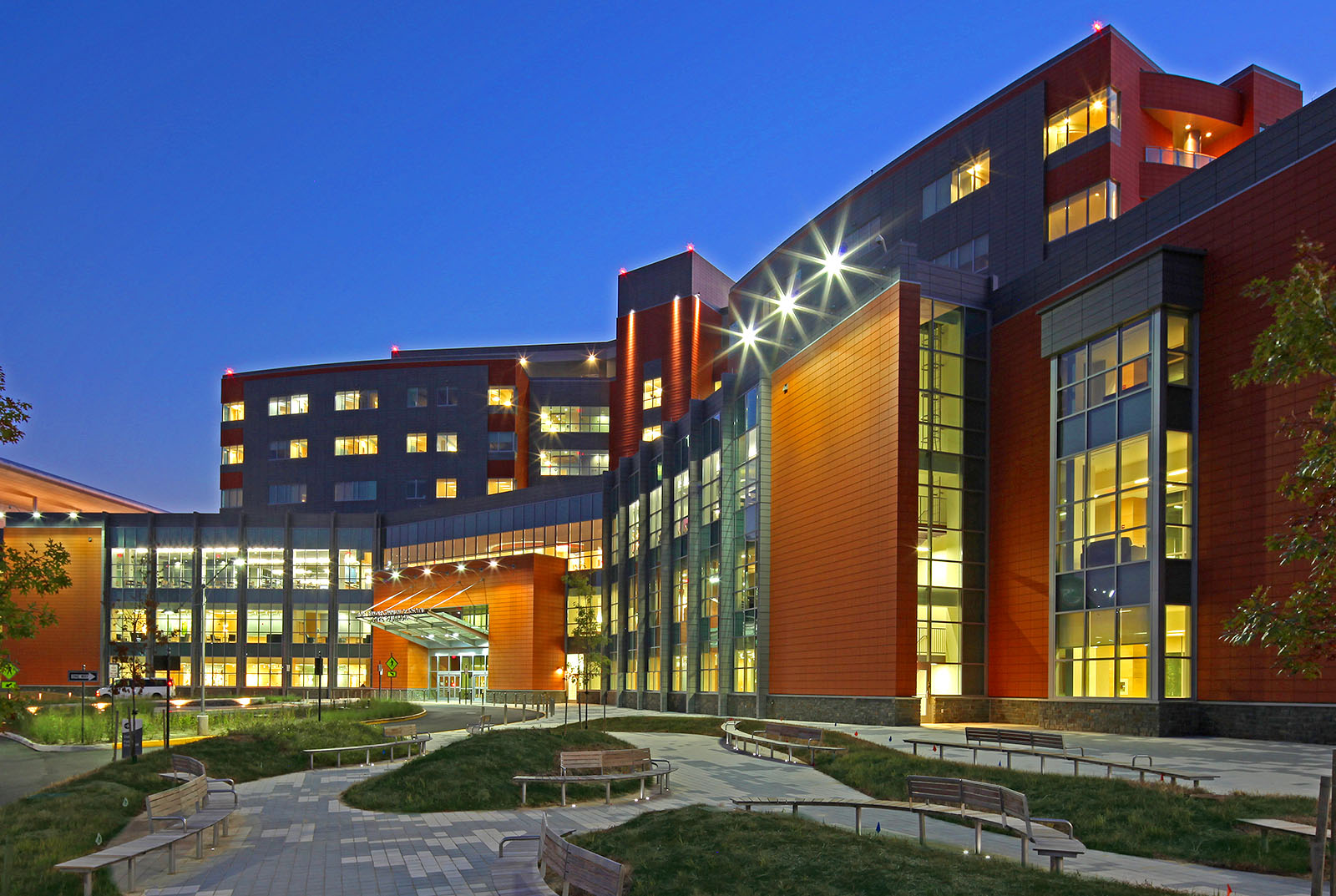
Front Entrance, Twilight

As part of a Base Realignment and Closure announcement on May 13, 2005, the Department of Defense proposed closing Walter Reed Army Medical Center (WRAMC) and merging it with the National Naval Medical Center located in Bethesda, MD, as well as replacing DeWitt Army Community Hospital. Moving nearly half of Walter Reed's services to DeWitt would greatly expand the hospital's mission. In November 2007, ground was broken on the grounds of the base's former South Post golf course for a new Fort Belvoir Community Hospital.

As part of the effort to transform service specific medical facilities into joint service facilities, during planning the hospital was designed to include Army, Navy, and Air Force medical personnel, making it one of the first joint medical facilities within the Department of Defense.

== Structure ==
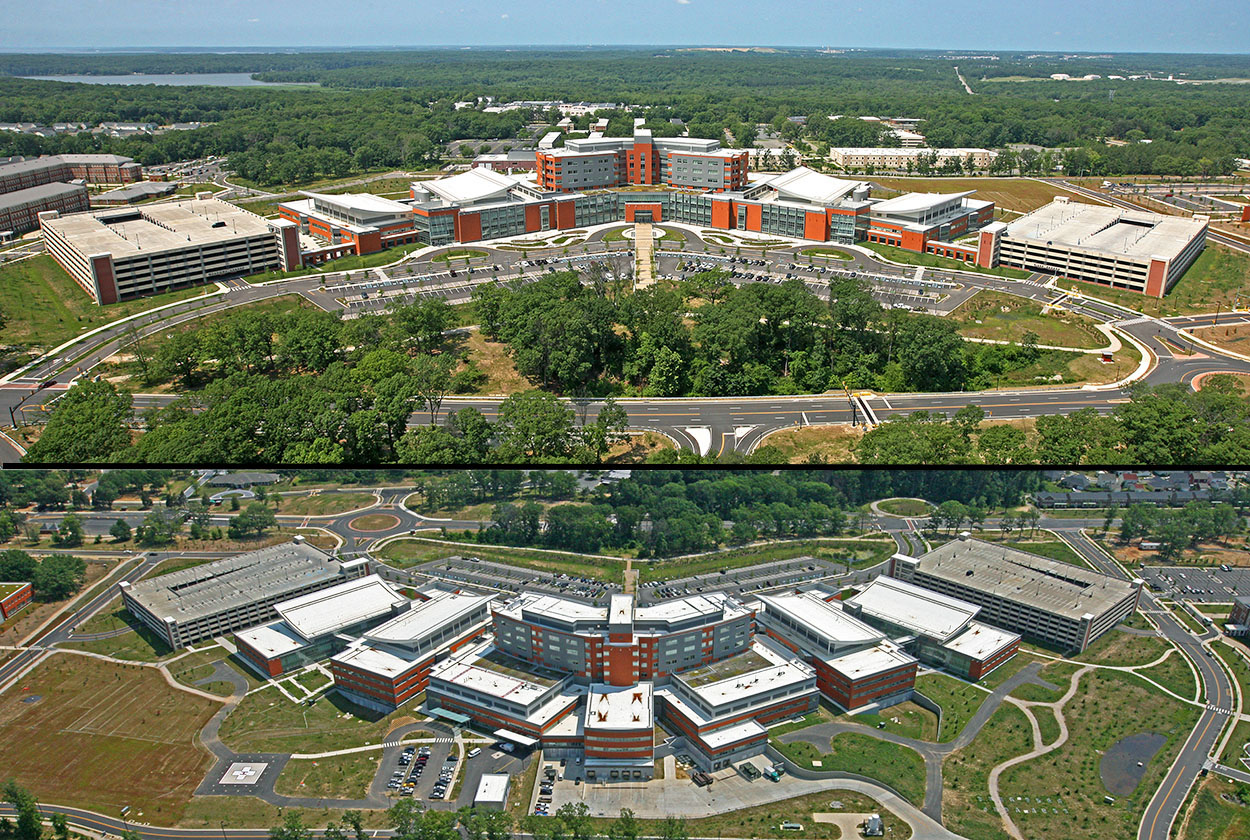
Augusta MHC from the front & back

The modern, 120-bed facility was designed by HDR, Inc. and is LEED Gold certified, incorporating sustainable and natural elements and themes. The facility incorporates a seven-story main structure, flanked on each side by two outpatient clinic areas providing both primary and specialty care. In total, it consists of five total buildings, 3500 parking spaces, 44 clinics, expanded pharmacy services, 430 exam rooms, 10 operating rooms, two DaVinci surgical systems, two linear accelerator cancer/oncology systems, and one of the military's only dedicated substance abuse programs.

Inpatient services were tripled in volume over the old hospital, and the expanded outpatient specialty care center offers services as a more local and convenient alternative than Walter Reed National Military Medical Center, which is located over 30 miles away on congested highways. The hospital incorporates evidence-based design principles in its treatment approach.

== Visits/Capacity ==
Department of Defense officials project the eligible beneficiary population will increase to more than 220,000 with approximately 40 percent of the expanded health care system enrolled population consisting of retirees and their family members. The anticipated outpatient workload is expected to grow to more than 600,000 visits per year in primary, specialty and ancillary clinics.

Selected specialty clinics such as Cardiology, Medical Oncology, Pulmonary, Radiation Oncology and Urology alone will generate approximately 54,000 appointments per year. The hospital's Labor and Delivery service delivered 104 babies in its first month of operations.

== Namesake ==
Following the inactivation of DeWitt Army Community Hospital, Brigadier General Wallace DeWitt Sr. was not retained as a namesake. The new facility's address, at 9300 DeWitt Loop, remained as a nod to the base's original hospital and its namesake, while the new facility was known only as Fort Belvoir Community Hospital for more than a decade after opening in 2011. While the new hospital's name was standardized with the conventions of other Army Community Hospitals, its designed intent to be collectively staffed by members of the joint services meant its name eschewed a reference to the Army.

On May 19, 2023, the hospital was named the Alexander T. Augusta Military Medical Center for brevet lieutenant colonel Alexander Thomas Augusta. Born in Norfolk, Virginia, and educated in Toronto, Augusta became the United States' first African American professor of medicine, and hospital administrator, the Army's first African American physician, and first black man to reach the rank of Major. Upon the outbreak of the Civil War, he traveled to Washington and appealed to president Lincoln. Ultimately the Army Medical Board reconsidered an initial rejection, and he was appointed the regimental surgeon of the 7th U.S. Colored Troops. He is also recorded as being responsible for the desegregation of train cars in Washington, D.C.

Upon the hospital's naming, it was redesignated from a Community Hospital, a type of Medical Department Activity (MEDDAC) to a Medical Center (MEDCEN), a higher designation assigned to the largest and most capable military medical facilities.
