= William D. Cardwell =

American politician (1868–1954)

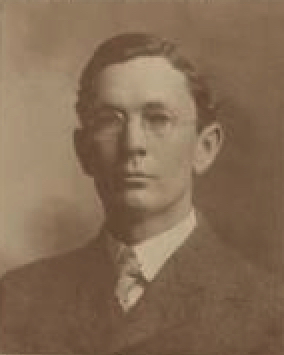
- Official portrait, 1906

39th Speaker of the Virginia House of Delegates
- In office January 10, 1906 – January 8, 1908
- Preceded by: John F. Ryan
- Succeeded by: Richard E. Byrd

Member of the Virginia House of Delegates from Hanover County
- In office December 6, 1899 – January 8, 1908
- Preceded by: Bickerton L. Winston
- Succeeded by: Rosewell Page

Personal details
- Born: William Duval Cardwell; April 12, 1868 Madison, North Carolina, U.S.
- Died: June 27, 1954 (aged 86) Seminole, Florida, U.S.
- Party: Democratic
- Spouse: Jane Price Gregory
- Parent: Richard H. Cardwell (father)
- Education: Randolph–Macon College; University of Virginia

Military service
- Branch/service: United States Navy
- Rank: Lieutenant commander
- Battles/wars: World War I

William Duval Cardwell (April 12, 1868 – June 27, 1954) was a Virginia politician. He represented Hanover County in the Virginia House of Delegates, and served as that body's Speaker from 1906 until 1908.

He was the son of Richard H. Cardwell.
