= Gary Myers (lawyer) =

American attorney and politician

Member of the Virginia House of Delegates from the 21st district
- In office 1978–1980
- Preceded by: James M. Thomson (redistricting)
- Succeeded by: David G. Speck

Personal details
- Born: Gary Rowland Myers; January 1, 1944 (age 82)
- Party: Republican
- Children: 3
- Education: University of Delaware (BS); Pennsylvania State University (JD)

Military service
- Branch/service: United States Army
- Years of service: 1969–1973
- Unit: Judge Advocate General's Corps
- Battles/wars: Vietnam War

Gary Rowland Myers (born January 1, 1944) is an American attorney and politician who specializes in military law.

== Education ==
Myers attended the University of Delaware where he received his Bachelor of Science degree in chemical engineering in 1965. Myers then attended the Penn State Dickinson Law. Myers was on the editorial board of the Dickinson Law Review and was published there as well as in the Journal of the Patent Office Society. He graduated in 1968.

== Career ==
Myers became a member of the Pennsylvania Bar Association in 1968 and the District of Columbia Bar in 1972.

After passing the bar, Myers volunteered during the Vietnam War and was a captain in the Judge Advocate General's Corps from 1969 to 1973. He was among those who participated as defense counsel in the court-martial of Captain Ernest Medina. His work in the My Lai Trials, a result of the My Lai Massacre, was portrayed in the book Medina by Mary McCarthy.

Following his years in JAG Corps, Myers spent three years as an adjunct professor at the Georgetown University Law Center from 1974 to 1976. In 1977, he was elected to the Virginia House of Delegates, where he represented the 21st district for one term.

In 1987, in the case of the United States v. Scott, Myers became the first lawyer in American history to use DNA evidence in a military court-martial. Cpl. Lindsey Scott, a member of the United States Marine Corps who was accused of rape, was eventually found not-guilty. Myers' work was portrayed in the Ellis Cohen book, Dangerous Evidence, published in 1995. In 1999, the book was adapted into a made-for-television film, Dangerous Evidence: The Lori Jackson Story, and Myers was portrayed by Canadian actor Geordie Johnson.

Later, Myers represented clients in the Abu Ghraib Detention Center case stemming from an incident during the Iraq War. His work in the Abu Ghraib case was recounted in the Philip Zimbardo book, The Lucifer Effect.

Myers also represented Marines in the Haditha Killings, which occurred in 2005. Mr. Myers' work in the Haditha case was featured in the PBS documentary, Frontline.

Myers is a partner at the Military Law Practice of Gary Myers, Daniel Conway & Associates in Weare, New Hampshire.

In March 2022, Myers ended his 52-year career as an attorney at Ramstein Air Base, Germany.

== Awards and honors ==
In 1968, his article, Industrial Protection of Pre-Production Disclosures, earned him the award for the Most Outstanding Law Review Article in the nation in the field of preventive law.
