= Fred W. Bateman =

American politician and judge (1916–1999)

Member of the Virginia Senate
- In office January 13, 1960 – January 10, 1968
- Preceded by: W. Marvin Minter
- Succeeded by: Herb Bateman
- Constituency: 31st district (1960‍–‍1964); 30th district (1964‍–‍1968)

Personal details
- Born: Fred William Bateman; September 18, 1916 Roper, North Carolina, U.S.
- Died: January 10, 1999 (aged 82) Newport News, Virginia, U.S.
- Party: Democratic
- Spouse: Frances Sondag
- Education: Wake Forest College; University of North Carolina

Military service
- Branch/service: United States Navy
- Years of service: 1941–1946
- Battles/wars: World War II; Pacific theater

Fred William Bateman (September 18, 1916 – January 10, 1999) was a Newport News Circuit Court judge and a Democratic member of the Senate of Virginia in the 1960s.

== Early life and education ==
Bateman was a native of Roper, North Carolina, and a graduate of Wake Forest University and the law school at the University of North Carolina. He joined the U.S. Navy as a commissioned officer after the Japanese attack on Pearl Harbor in 1941. Bateman served as a line officer on ships in the South Pacific throughout World War II.

== Legal and political career ==
At the conclusion of the war, Bateman moved to Richmond, Virginia, in 1947 and then, in 1952, to Warwick County (which later became Newport News). He practiced law the firm of Newman, Allaun and Downing.

Bateman was elected to the Senate from the 31st Senatorial District in 1959, and after redistricting, from the 30th District, serving until 1968. He was a member of the Senate Finance, Courts of Justice, and Transportation Committees.

In 1981, Bateman was elected by the legislature to be a judge of the Newport News Circuit Court. He retired at the age of 72, but he continued to serve as a substitute judge for many years.

Bateman died on January 10, 1999, and the Virginia General Assembly passed Senate Joint Resolution Number 564 (1999) honoring his service and acknowledging his death.

Senate of Virginia
Preceded by Marvin W. Minter	Virginia Senate, District 31; 1960–1964	Succeeded by Hunter Andrews
Preceded by Thomas H. Blanton	Virginia Senate, District 30; 1964–1968	Succeeded by Edward E. Willey and J. Sargeant Reynolds
Preceded by	Judge, Newport News Circuit Court; 1981-1989	Succeeded by
