= Walter Reed National Military Medical Center =

Military tri-service medical center in Bethesda, Maryland, United States

- National Capital Region Medical Directorate

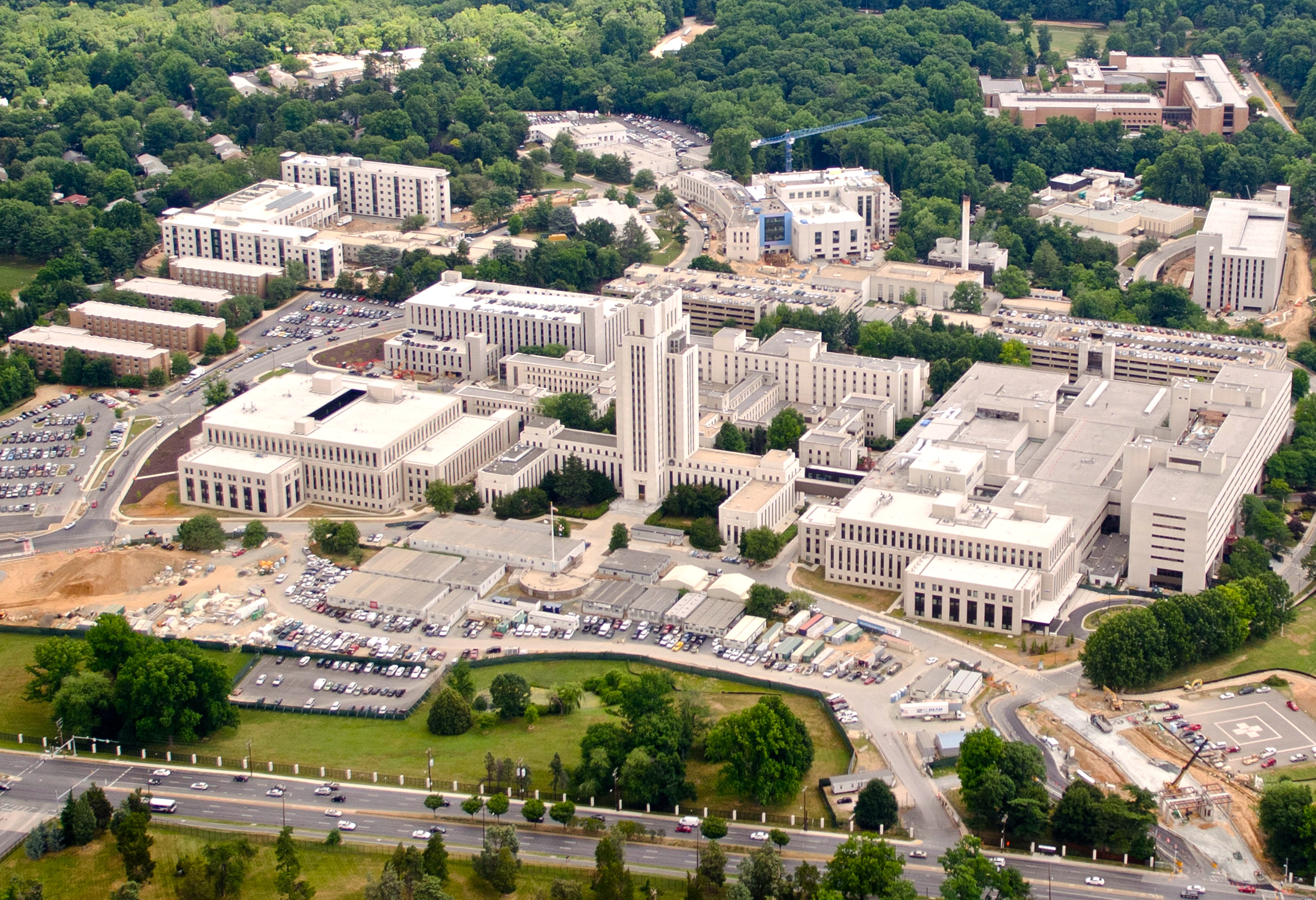
- Walter Reed National Military Medical Center in June 2011

Geography
- Location: 8901 Rockville Pike, Bethesda, Maryland, U.S.

Organisation
- Care system: Tricare
- Type: Teaching
- Affiliated university: Uniformed Services University of the Health Sciences

Services
- Emergency department: Level II Trauma Center
- Beds: 244

Helipads
- Helipad: IATA: 60MD
Number	Length		Surface
Number	ft	m	Surface
H1	60	18	Concrete

History
- Constructed: June 29, 1939
- Founded: November 11, 1940; 85 years ago

Links
- Website: walterreed.tricare.mil
- Lists: Hospitals in U.S.
- Bethesda Naval Hospital Tower
- U.S. National Register of Historic Places
- Location: 8901 Rockville Pike, Bethesda, Maryland, U.S.
- Coordinates: 39°00′06″N 77°05′41″W
- Area: 1 acre (0.4 ha)
- Built: 1939
- Architect: Paul Cret and Frederic W. Southworth
- Architectural style: Classical Revival
- NRHP reference No.: 77000700
- Added to NRHP: March 8, 1977

Walter Reed National Military Medical Center (WRNMMC; formerly known as the National Naval Medical Center and colloquially referred to as Bethesda Naval Hospital, Walter Reed, or Navy Med) is a United States military medical center located in Bethesda, Maryland. It is one of the largest and most prominent military medical centers in the United States, and it has provided medical care for several United States presidents since its opening in 1940.

In 2011, the Walter Reed Army Medical Center (WRAMC), named after yellow fever researcher Walter Reed, was combined with the National Naval Medical Center to form today's tri-service Walter Reed National Military Medical Center.

It is accessed by the Medical Center station on the Washington Metro's Red Line.

Walter Reed National Military Medical Center
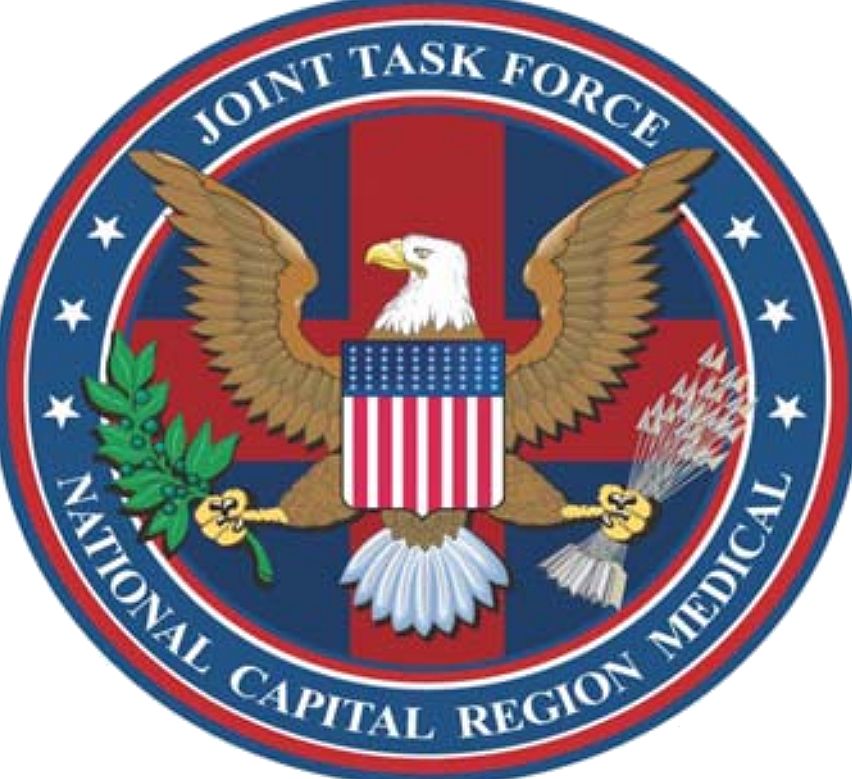
- The National Capital Region Medical Directorate logo
- Active: November 11, 1940 – present
- Country: United States
- Type: Military hospital
- Part of: Defense Health Agency

Insignia
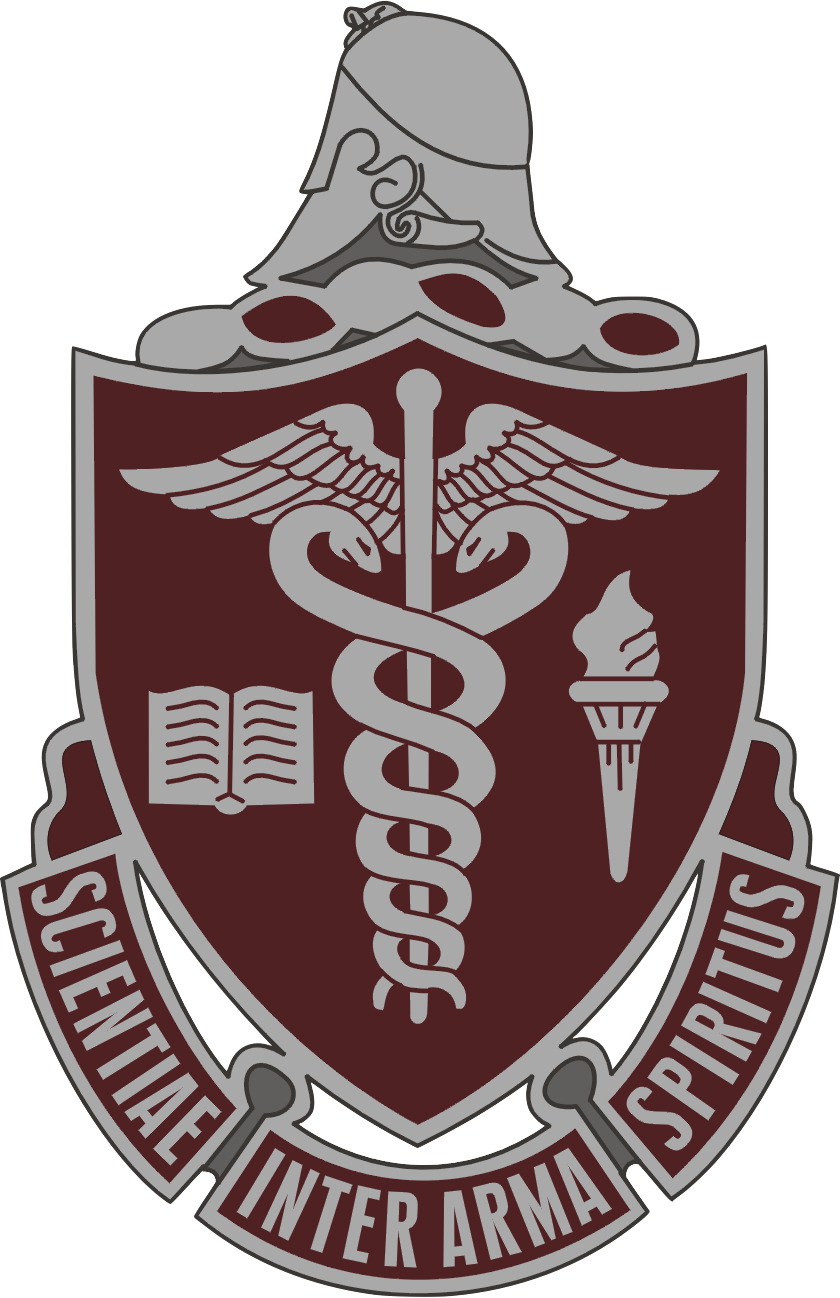
- Army Element, Distinctive Unit Insignia

== History ==
=== Founding ===
In 1938, the United States Congress appropriated funds for the acquisition of land for the construction of a new naval medical center, and President Franklin D. Roosevelt selected the present site in Bethesda, Maryland, and exterior design for it, on July 5, 1938. Ground was broken by John McShain Builders for the Naval Medical Center on June 29, 1939, by Rear Admiral Perceval S. Rossiter, and President Roosevelt laid the cornerstone of the Tower on Armistice Day, November 11, 1940.

The original Medical Center included the Naval Hospital, designed to hold 1,200 beds, and the Naval Medical School, the Naval Dental School, now the National Naval Dental Center and the Naval Medical Research Institute. In 1945, at the end of World War II, temporary buildings were added to accommodate up to 2,464 wounded American sailors and Marines.

On May 22, 1949, former U.S. Secretary of the Navy and first Secretary of Defense James Forrestal died by alleged suicide after jumping (or falling) from the 16th floor of the hospital tower.

=== Kennedy assassination ===
On November 22, 1963, President John F. Kennedy was shot and killed while riding in a motorcade in Dallas with his wife, Jacqueline, Texas Governor John Connally, and his wife, Nellie. The wounded president was taken to Parkland Memorial Hospital, where he was pronounced dead. The Parkland doctors and local coroner insisted that they perform the autopsy, since he had been murdered in Dallas County. However, the Secret Service demanded that the assassinated president's body be taken to Washington, D.C. immediately aboard Air Force One. Kennedy's autopsy was performed at the Naval Medical Center.

=== Presidential and first family visits ===
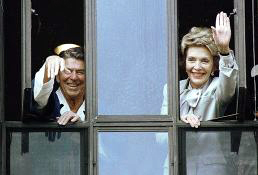
U.S. President Ronald Reagan and First Lady Nancy Reagan wave from a Walter Reed hospital window after his cancer surgery in 1985.

Since its opening, Walter Reed National Medical Center has been the site for medical evaluations and treatments for U.S. presidents. The medical center includes a presidential office suite that is controlled by the White House, not the U.S. Department of Defense, and it includes a sitting room, kitchen, conference room, hospital bedroom, and an office for the White House Chief of Staff. Presidents and vice presidents are routinely treated at the Medical Evaluation and Treatment Unit or METU Suite, which is a secured and autonomous ward within the complex.

Franklin D. Roosevelt selected the site of the hospital, laid the cornerstone, and made formal dedication remarks at the hospital's opening on November 11, 1940. When NNMC was dedicated in 1942, its original intention was to provide medical care exclusively to military personnel. The medical center, however, immediately offered to assist in the treatment of Roosevelt's paralysis of his lower extremities. An official White House physician was appointed by the President to tend to ongoing medical care of U.S. presidents. Since Roosevelt, most presidents have used a military hospital close to Washington, D.C., either Bethesda or Walter Reed AMC, as the primary facility for their medical care and that of their immediate family.

President Lyndon B. Johnson was a patient at the medical center several times during his presidency. On January 23, 1965, he was hospitalized with what the White House called "a common cold with tracheal and bronchial irritation"; First Lady "Lady Bird" Johnson was admitted later that day with a similar condition. They both left the hospital on January 26.

On October 8, 1965, Johnson was admitted for surgery to have his gallbladder and a kidney stone removed; he was released on October 21. On November 15, 1966, he was admitted for surgery to have a hernia repaired and a small throat polyp removed; he was released on November 19. At the time of these hospitalizations, the 25th Amendment, concerning presidential succession and disability, was not yet in place; however, unofficial agreements regarding presidential disability had been made between presidents and vice presidents since early 1958, during the presidency of Dwight D. Eisenhower. Thus, when Johnson went under anesthesia for his procedures in 1965 and 1966, presidential authority was temporarily relegated to Vice President Hubert Humphrey according to their own agreement.

On December 18, 1968, Johnson was hospitalized with "an upper respiratory infection with a slight bronchial irritation" during the so-called Hong Kong flu pandemic. He returned to the White House on December 22.

On September 28, 1974, First Lady Betty Ford underwent a mastectomy to treat breast cancer at the medical center.

On July 13, 1985, President Ronald Reagan underwent surgery to remove a cancerous polyp from his colon at the medical center. He sent a letter transferring power to then–Vice President George H. W. Bush invoking the Acting President clause of the 25th Amendment during his procedure. On January 5, 1987, Reagan underwent a transurethral prostatectomy at the medical center.

On October 17, 1987, First Lady Nancy Reagan underwent a mastectomy to treat breast cancer at the medical center.

On May 14, 2018, First Lady Melania Trump underwent an embolization, a minimally invasive procedure that deliberately blocks a blood vessel in order to treat a benign kidney condition. The procedure was reported successful and without complications.

On October 2, 2020, President Donald Trump was admitted after contracting COVID-19 during the COVID-19 pandemic. Trump was discharged from the hospital on October 5, following three days of inpatient care.

On July 29, 2021, First Lady Jill Biden underwent a procedure on her foot following an injury at the beach in Hawaii. On January 11, 2023, she had three skin lesions removed, two of which were cancerous.

=== Modernization ===
In August 1960, a $5.6 million expansion project was initiated and consisted of two five-story wings attached to the main building's east side. Completed in the summer of 1963, Buildings 7 and 8 provided space for 258 beds and replaced the World War II-era ward buildings.

In January 1973, the mission of the Naval Medical Center was modified to include the provision: "to provide coordinated dispensary health care services as an integral element of the Naval Regional Health Care System, including shore activities, as may be assigned." This change established the National Naval Medical Center Region and placed all U.S. Navy health care facilities under the authority of the medical center's commanding officer.

New inpatient buildings and the Naval Medical Center were consolidated on September 1, 1973, forming the National Naval Medical Center. In 1975, an extensive renovation began, which included the construction of two new buildings: Building 9, a three-story outpatient structure, and Building 10, a seven-story, 500 bed inpatient facility, with a combined area of more than 880,000 square feet (82,000 m^{2}).

In 1979, the remaining temporary buildings were replaced with a multi-level staff-parking garage. This addition made National Naval Medical Center one of the largest medical facilities in the nation. The original Naval Medical Center tower was since listed on the National Register of Historic Places by the U.S. Department of the Interior.

=== Facility merger ===
In accordance with the 2005 Base Realignment and Closure recommendations, the Office of Integration (OI) was formed in November 2005 to oversee the merger of the Walter Reed Army Medical Center (WRAMC) and the National Naval Medical Center (NNMC). This merged facility was to be staffed by Army, Navy, and Air Force medical personnel and become the core of an integrated military medicine system in the National Capital Region (NCR). Three medical centers, a small community hospital, and 19 clinics offering medical care to military beneficiaries in the NCR were to become, with oversight of the OI, a single tri-service medical center, a large tri-service hospital in Northern Virginia, and 20 area clinics.

=== Construction and cost overruns ===
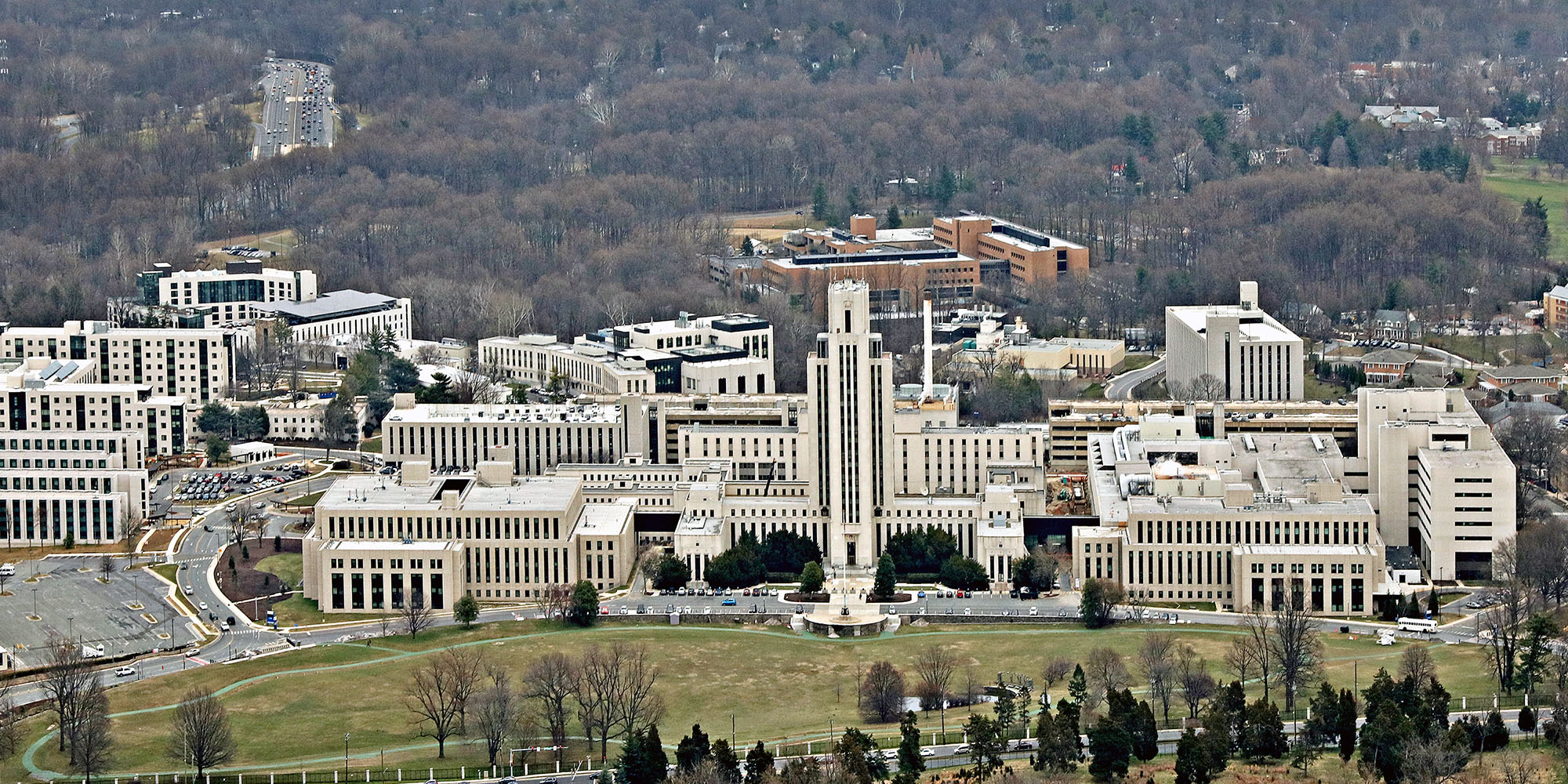
Walter Reed National Military Medical Center looking east

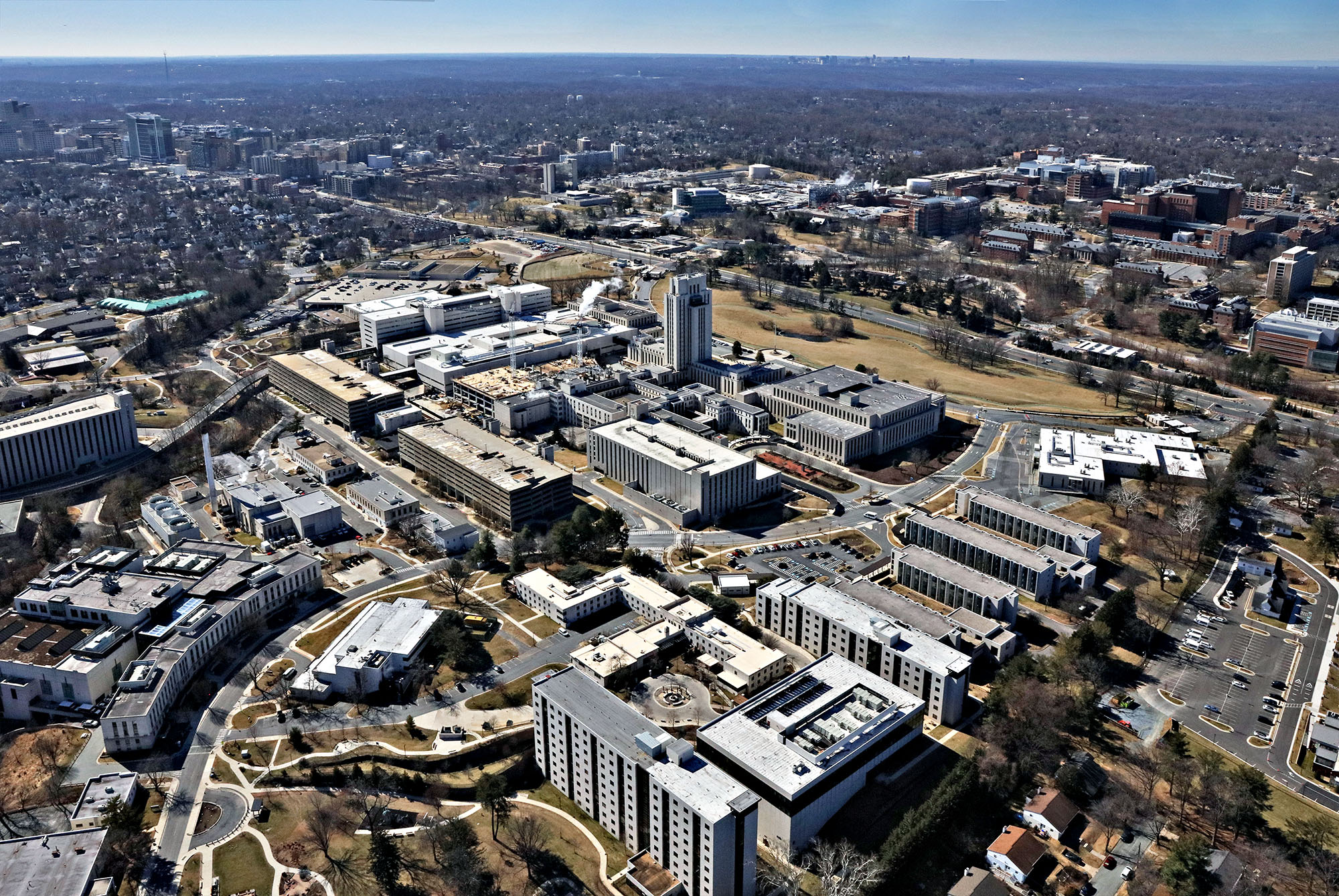
Walter Reed National Military Medical Center looking southwest

Groundbreaking took place on July 3, 2008, with President George W. Bush officiating. The goal of the merger was for the government to ultimately spend less money maintaining a new building than an old one. It was estimated that the new facility would cost about $172 million less to manage each year. The original 2005 estimate of the cost of shutting down WRAMC, and shifting it across town to Bethesda, and other locations, was "just under $900 million", according to Brian Lepore of the Government Accountability Office. The point after which the full amount of the investment would have been recouped and at which point savings would actually have commenced was projected to be 2011. But the relocation cost unexpectedly rose by 245% between the original 2005 projection and the 2011 opening. Instead of under $900 million, it turned out to cost $2.7 billion, roughly triple its initial cost projections. As a result, the payback period was expected to begin about seven years later, around 2018. One reason costs skyrocketed was that construction costs escalated, partly due to a huge amount of building materials being sent to the Gulf Coast in the wake of Hurricane Katrina. In 2005, Todd Harrison, a defense analyst with the Center for Strategic and Budgetary Assessments, said, "when they made their initial estimates of what it would cost...they did their best estimate...A lot of things have changed since then. Construction costs have gone up." The GAO agreed that the project tripled in price, which was attributed mostly to increased construction costs.

On September 14, 2011, NNMC was rechristened Walter Reed National Military Medical Center, combining the former Walter Reed Army Medical Center with the National Naval Medical Center.

=== Current operations ===
WRNMMC serves as the location of the headquarters for the National Capital Region Medical Directorate, a tri-service task force providing command and control for most medical treatment facilities in the District of Columbia and Northern Virginia, Maryland, Pennsylvania, West Virginia, and New Jersey. The WRNMMC continues to provide all the services it provided as NNMC and WRAMC.

== Services ==
Walter Reed National Military Medical Center contains many services for members of the military, veterans, and families of both.

=== Pediatrics ===
WRNMMC has multiple pediatric departments that generally treat infants, children, teens, and young adults up to age 23 with some pediatric clinics treating up until age 26.
