= Charles Bendheim =

American politician (1866–1934)

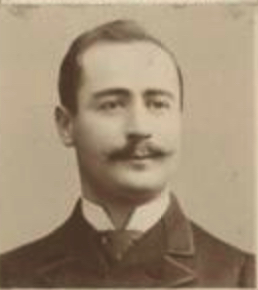
- Bendheim in 1891

Member of the Virginia House of Delegates for Alexandria City and Alexandria
- In office December 2, 1891 – December 4, 1895
- Preceded by: Frank Hume
- Succeeded by: William H. May

Personal details
- Born: May 15, 1866
- Died: April 30, 1934 (aged 67) New York, New York, U.S.
- Party: Democratic
- Spouse: Edith Schwarz (m. 1904)
- Children: Leroy
- Education: Columbian College

Charles Bendheim (May 15, 1866 – April 30, 1934) was an American politician and lawyer from Virginia. He served in the Virginia House of Delegates from 1891 to 1894.

== Early life ==
Charles Bendheim was born to Leopold Bendheim. He attended St. John's Military College. He graduated from Columbian College with a degree in law in 1886.

== Career ==
Bendheim served as a member of the Virginia House of Delegates, representing Alexandria City and Alexandria County, from 1891 to 1894. In 1903, Bendheim served as chairman of Alexandria City Democratic Committee.

Bendheim served as assistant United States district attorney for Washington, D.C., from 1915 to 1916. He was a member of Alexandria City Council from 1916 to 1918. He worked as a clerk for the corporation and circuit courts of Alexandria. For 16 years, Bendheim worked as commissioner of conciliation for the United States Department of Labor.

== Personal life ==
Bendheim married Edith Schwarz, daughter of Isaac Schwarz, on January 14, 1904. They had one son, Leroy S. He lived at 812 Prince Street in Alexandria.

Bendheim died of heart disease on April 30, 1934, at a hospital in New York City.
