= Leroy S. Bendheim =

American politician

Member of the Virginia Senate
- In office January 12, 1972 – January 14, 1976
- Preceded by: Armistead L. Boothe
- Succeeded by: Wiley F. Mitchell
- Constituency: 36th district (1964‍–‍1966); 33rd district (1966‍–‍1972); 30th district (1972‍–‍1976)

Mayor of Alexandria, Virginia
- In office July 1, 1955 – July 1, 1961
- Preceded by: Marshall J. Beverley
- Succeeded by: Frank E. Mann

Personal details
- Born: February 12, 1906 Alexandria, Virginia, U.S.
- Died: June 18, 1987 (aged 81) Alexandria, Virginia, U.S.
- Party: Democratic
- Spouse: Ethel Colman
- Parent: Charles Bendheim (father)
- Education: George Washington University
- Profession: Attorney

Leroy S. Bendheim (February 12, 1906 – June 18, 1987) was a two-term mayor of Alexandria, Virginia, and three-term Virginia state senator.

== Family and early life ==
Bendheim was born in Alexandria, the son of Charles Bendheim and Elizabeth Schwarz. His father was a member of the Alexandria City Council and a member of the Virginia House of Delegates. He graduated from law school at George Washington University in 1929.

== Political career ==
Bendheim served on the Alexandria School Board from 1934 to 1943, and was chairman for five years. Elected to the City Council as a Democrat, he served from 1948 to 1955; he received the most votes for the at-large council and, thus, was vice mayor from 1952 to 1955. In 1955, he was elected Mayor of Alexandria and served two three-year terms as mayor before his defeat in 1961 by fellow Democrat Frank E. Mann.

In 1963, Bendheim was elected to the Virginia Senate, representing Alexandria and served there 12 years. In 1975, he was defeated in a bid for a fourth term by Republican Wiley F. Mitchell. Bendheim never served in elected office again.

== Death ==
Bendheim died on June 18, 1987, of cancer at Alexandria Hospital in Alexandria, Virginia.

Senate of Virginia
Preceded by Armistead L. Boothe	Virginia Senator for the 36th District; 1964–1966	Succeeded by District eliminated
Preceded by Edward E. Willey; FitzGerald Bemiss multimember district	Virginia Senator for the 33rd District; 1966–1972	Succeeded by Charles L. Waddell
Preceded by Edward E. Willey; L. Douglas Wilder multimember district	Virginia Senator for the 30th District; 1972–1976	Succeeded by Wiley F. Mitchell
