= James M. Thomson (Virginia politician) =

American politician

9th Virginia Commissioner of Insurance
- In office December 1, 1981 – December 31, 1986
- Preceded by: James W. Newman Jr.
- Succeeded by: Steven T. Foster

Majority Leader of the Virginia House of Delegates
- In office January 10, 1968 – January 11, 1978
- Preceded by: John Warren Cooke
- Succeeded by: A. L. Philpott

Member of the Virginia House of Delegates from the 5th district
- In office January 1955 – January 11, 1978
- Preceded by: Armistead L. Boothe
- Succeeded by: Gary Myers

Personal details
- Born: James McIlhany Thomson; August 9, 1924 New Orleans, Louisiana, U.S.
- Died: July 24, 2001 (aged 76) Berryville, Virginia, U.S.
- Party: Democratic
- Relations: Harry F. Byrd Jr. (brother-in-law)
- Education: Virginia Military Institute (B.A.); University of Virginia (LL.B.)
- Profession: Lawyer

Military service
- Allegiance: United States
- Branch/service: United States Marine Corps
- Years of service: 1943–1946
- Battles/wars: World War II

James McIlhany Thomson (August 9, 1924 – July 24, 2001) was a member of the Virginia House of Delegates representing Alexandria from 1956 to 1977. A member of the Byrd Organization, Thomson became the Virginia House Democratic floor leader, a position which he held until 1977.

== Early life and education ==
Thomson was born in New Orleans, Louisiana. He was named after his uncle James M. Thomson, the renowned editor of the New Orleans States-Item, who once encouraged U.S. Senator Harry F. Byrd to run for president against Franklin D. Roosevelt. Thomson attended St. James Episcopal School in Hagerstown, Maryland, then served in the United States Marine Corps in World War II. In 1946, he graduated from the Virginia Military Institute in Lexington and in 1950 received a law degree from the University of Virginia at Charlottesville.

== Political career ==
Thomson was elected to the Virginia House of Delegates in 1955 from Alexandria to succeed Armistead L. Boothe, who instead won a seat in the Virginia Senate (This election was the first in which the seat from the growing city was assigned a district). He thus began his part-time public service during the era of Massive Resistance to racial desegregation of public schools as required by the 1954 and 1955 decisions in Brown v. Board of Education. Unlike Boothe, Thomson worked to support segregation, in part because his sister, Gretchen Bigelow Thomson, had married Harry F. Byrd Jr., the son and heir apparent to Senator Harry Flood Byrd Sr., who had declared the Massive Resistance policy in February 1956.

Although a lawyer, Thomson believed that segregated schools could be restored, even after the decisions of the Virginia Supreme Court and a three-judge federal court issued on January 19, 1959 (Robert E. Lee's birthday) striking down segregationist portions of the Stanley Plan. Earlier, in a special August 1956 legislative session, Virginia legislators passed the Stanley Plan as well as created two new joint investigative committees. Among the laws then passed were seven directed against the NAACP and other organizations challenging racial segregation within the Commonwealth, drafted by fellow lawyer and state Senator Charles R. Fenwick of Arlington (one of the school districts being sued). The legislation exceeded the recommendations of the Gray Commission on which Fenwick and other Byrd loyalists sat. 77-year old Senator John B. Boatwright of Buckingham chaired the new Committee on Offenses against the Administration of Justice. His committee's subpoenaing NAACP membership lists and other investigative activities did reduce the organization's membership by half. However, by 1959 Boatwright was complaining that the Virginia State Bar was spending $5000 on a Jamestown commemoration and $6350 on a new continuing legal education program, but not "punishing those guilty of unprofessional conduct and those engaged in the unauthorized practice of law" under the Stanley Plan's 1956 ethics law expansion. The 32 year old delegate Thomson chaired the other new investigative committee, the Committee on Law Reform and Racial Activities (a/k/a Thomson Committee). His aggressive questioning of printer David H. Scull (a Quaker from Annandale) concerning a desegregationist pamphlet Scull published, led to Scull's questioning the committee's and questions' scope and being cited for contempt by an Arlington court, which case ultimately reached the U.S. Supreme Court. In Scull v. Virginia ex rel. Committee on Law Reform & Racial Activities issued on May 4, 1959, the justices unanimously overturned Scull's conviction.

With his segregationist position, Thomson handily won his next primary election in July 1959, as well as reelection that fall (Boothe also won, against a segregationist challenger). After most local schools reopened and segregation became less popular in 1961, Thomson survived a primary challenge from Dennis K. Lane. This time he lost the initial vote count by four votes, but won the Democratic nomination (and later re-election) by one vote after a recount ordered by the Virginia Supreme Court. This was the first of several narrow elections which earned Thomson the nickname "Landslide Jim". When Alexandria won an additional seat because of the United States Supreme Court decision in Davis v. Mann (brought by other northern Virginia legislators against reapportionment by the Byrd Organization dominated legislature), he would be joined in the legislature by another Democrat with a very different political philosophy, Marion Galland, the first woman elected to represent the historic city in the Virginia General Assembly.

After leaving electoral office, Thomson was appointed Virginia's insurance commissioner.

== Death ==
Thomson died on July 24, 2001, in Berryville, Virginia, and is interred at the Thomson family plot in the Edge Hill Cemetery in Charles Town, West Virginia, with his parents, brothers and two aunts. His sister Gretchen Thomson Byrd, who had married Harry F. Byrd Jr., is buried in the Byrd family plot in Mount Hebron Cemetery in Winchester, Virginia, between Berryville and Charles Town.

Virginia House of Delegates
Preceded by Armistead Boothe	Virginia House, District 5; 1956–1971	Succeeded by Stafford C. Jefferson
