= Franklin P. Backus =

American judge

Mayor of Alexandria, Virginia
- In office July 1, 1949 – July 1, 1951
- Preceded by: William T. Wilkins
- Succeeded by: Marshall J. Beverley

Judge, Alexandria Circuit Court
- In office 1952–1978

Personal details
- Born: December 22, 1913 Washington, D.C., U.S.
- Died: October 7, 2007 (aged 93) Alexandria, Virginia, U.S.
- Party: Democratic
- Education: George Washington University; University of Virginia

Franklin P. Backus (December 22, 1913 – October 7, 2007) was a long-time judge and one-term mayor of Alexandria, Virginia. He is credited with helping to establish Virginia's statewide juvenile court system.

== Early life ==
Backus was born in Washington, DC and moved to Alexandria, Virginia at the age of 7. He graduated from George Washington University in 1932 and received his law degree from the University of Virginia in 1936. Backus had a small law practice and helped found the Alexandria Jaycees in 1940, serving as its first president.

== Military and public service ==
He was commissioned an officer in the U.S. Navy and served in World War II. At the conclusion of the war, Backus returned to Alexandria and resumed the practice of law. In 1949, he was elected Mayor of Alexandria as a Democrat and served one term in office. His tenure as mayor was notable for Alexandria's annexation of territory west of Quaker Lane from Fairfax County, Virginia. This was the last significant annexation by the City of Alexandria. At the conclusion of his term as Mayor, in 1952, Backus was appointed a Judge of the Circuit Court for Alexandria.

== Judicial service ==
Judge Backus had helped establish Virginia's juvenile court system and helped establish the Virginia Judicial Inquiry and Review Commission in 1972, which investigates allegations of judicial misconduct. He served as President of the Commission twice.

Backus retired as chief judge of the Alexandria Circuit Court in 1978. He continued to hear cases, traveling across the state until 1983.

== Death and legacy ==
Backus died in Alexandria on October 7, 2007. The circuit courthouse in Alexandria is named in honor of Judge Backus.

Political offices
Preceded by William T. Wilkins	Mayor of the City of Alexandria, Virginia; 1949–1951	Succeeded by Marshall J. Beverley
