= Lawrence W. Corbett =

American politician (1859–1897)

Member of the Virginia House of Delegates from the Alexandria City and Alexandria County district
- In office December 8, 1887 – March 5, 1888
- Preceded by: Charles E. Stuart
- Succeeded by: Frank Hume

Personal details
- Born: 1859 Alexandria, Virginia, U.S.
- Died: January 7, 1897 (aged 37–38) Alexandria, Virginia, U.S.
- Resting place: St. Mary's Cemetery
- Party: Republican
- Occupation: Politician

Lawrence W. Corbett (1859 – January 7, 1897) was an American politician from Virginia. He served as a member of the Virginia House of Delegates from 1887 to 1888.

== Early life ==
Lawrence W. Corbett was born in 1859 in Alexandria, Virginia. He attended St. John's Academy in Alexandria. He worked as a clerk in the notions store of C. W. Green. He later moved to Richmond.

== Career ==
Corbett was a Republican. He was a member of the city council in Alexandria, representing the third ward. Corbett was elected as a member of the Virginia House of Delegates in 1887, defeating incumbent Charles E. Stuart. He represented Alexandria City and Alexandria County in the House of Delegates from December 8, 1887, to March 5, 1888. He served as deputy collector of the port in Alexandria during President Benjamin Harrison's term. He was a candidate for city postmaster, but lost to Agnew.

In 1895, Corbett joined the real estate firm M. B. Harlow & Co.

== Personal life ==
Corbett married and had several children.

Corbett died of consumption on January 7, 1897, at his home in Alexandria. He was buried at St. Mary's Cemetery.
