= Herb Bateman =

American politician (1928–2000)

- Official portrait, 1983

Member of the U.S. House of Representatives from Virginia's 1st district
- In office January 3, 1983 – September 11, 2000
- Preceded by: Paul Trible
- Succeeded by: Jo Ann Davis

Member of the Virginia Senate
- In office January 10, 1968 – December 15, 1982
- Preceded by: Fred W. Bateman
- Succeeded by: Bobby Scott
- Constituency: 27th district (1968‍–‍1972); 2nd district (1972‍–‍1982)

Personal details
- Born: Herbert Harvell Bateman; August 7, 1928 Elizabeth City, North Carolina, United States
- Died: September 11, 2000 (aged 72) Leesburg, Virginia, United States
- Party: Democratic (until 1976); Republican (1976‍–‍2000)
- Spouse: Laura Bateman
- Education: College of William & Mary (BA); Georgetown University (LLB)
- Occupation: Lawyer; politician

Military service
- Branch/service: United States Air Force
- Years of service: 1951‍–‍1953
- Rank: First lieutenant
- Battles/wars: Korean War
- Herb Bateman's voice Bateman commemorates the 100th anniversary of Newport News Shipbuilding; Recorded February 27, 1986

Herbert Harvell Bateman (August 7, 1928 – September 11, 2000) was an American politician in Virginia. He was a nine-term member of the United States House of Representatives, serving as a Republican from 1983 until his death.

== Early life ==
Bateman was born in Elizabeth City, North Carolina on August 7, 1928. However, he lived most of his life in Newport News, Virginia. A graduate of Newport News High School in 1945, Bateman went on to William and Mary to earn a Bachelor's degree.

=== Military career ===
After graduation, he briefly taught at Hampton High School from 1949 to 1951, when he commissioned in the United States Air Force as a first lieutenant during the Korean War. He was a special agent at the U.S. Air Force Office of Special Investigations (AFOSI or OSI) and served until 1953.

=== Early legal career ===
Upon his return home, Bateman enrolled in the Law Center at Georgetown University, where in 1956 he earned his law degree. He served a short time as a clerk for the United States Court of Appeals in Washington, D.C. before practicing law privately in Newport News from 1968 to 1983. During this period he worked to build a political base through community activism and membership in the Virginia Jaycees. Bateman served as president of the Virginia Jaycees and National legal counsel for the United States Junior Chamber of Commerce.

== Political career ==
Bateman was elected to the Senate of Virginia for 14 years, representing a portion of Newport News. He was originally a Democrat, but became a Republican in 1976.

In 1982, he was elected to succeed Paul S. Trible, Jr. as the representative for the 1st District in the United States House of Representatives. He won his first contest with 55 percent of the vote and was reelected eight times. He would only face another contest anywhere near that close, when Democrat Andrew Fox held him to only 51 percent of the vote in 1990. However, after the 1990 Census, most of Bateman's black constituents in Hampton and Newport News were drawn into the new 3rd district, allowing Bateman to consolidate his hold on the seat.

Bateman's voting record was moderate by Southern Republican standards; he had a lifetime rating of 79 from the American Conservative Union. He diverged from many of his contemporaries in supporting gun control measures. He was a strong supporter of controlling government spending. However, he was particularly active on defense issues. Since Newport News was a center for military work, he strongly supported military spending. He was a member of the Armed Forces and Transportation Infrastructure Committees for nearly all of his career, and chaired the House Armed Forces Subcommittee on Military Readiness and the House Merchant Marine Panel. He also served his constituents as a member of organizations such as the Virginia Jaycees, Peninsula United Way and Red Cross Blood Donor Program.

=== Elections ===
- 1982 – Bateman defeated Democrat John McGlennon to win his first term in Congress; he won 55% of the vote
- 1984 – Re-elected with 59% of the vote over Democrat McGlennon and Independent E. J. Green
- 1986 – Re-elected with 56% of the vote over Democrat Robert Cortez Scott
- 1988 – Re-elected with 73% of the vote over Democrat James S. Ellenson
- 1990 – Re-elected with 51% of the vote over Democrat Andrew H. Fox
- 1992 – Re-elected with 58% of the vote over Democrat Fox and Independent Donald L. Macleay
- 1994 – Re-elected with 74% of the vote over Democrat Mary F. Sinclair and Independent Matt B. Voorhees
- 1996 – Was unopposed for re-election
- 1998 – Re-elected with 76% of the vote over Independents Josh Billings and Bradford L. Phillips

== Health and death ==
Bateman battled several significant health issues in the final decade of his life. In 1990, he was diagnosed with lung and prostate cancer. In 1995, he suffered a heart attack, but was able to recover. He had surgery to remove cancer from his right lung in 1998, and had a partial blockage of a major artery removed in 1999. He was diagnosed with a cancerous lymph node in January 2000, which prompted him to not seek re-election.

On September 10, 2000, Bateman traveled to Loudoun County, Virginia, to play in a golf tournament. Afterward, he and his wife stayed at a local hotel, but he could not be awoken the following morning; he was taken to a hospital in nearby Leesburg, where he was pronounced dead at the age of 72. He is buried in Peninsula Memorial Park in Newport News, Virginia.

== Family ==
He and his wife, Laura, had two children, a son and daughter. His son, Herbert H. Bateman Jr., was elected to the Newport News City Council, and served as Vice Mayor and on the Peninsula Airport Commission. Daughter, Laura Margaret Bateman, is the principal of Bateman Consulting, a government and public affairs consulting firm. His papers from his time as a state senator as well as from his time in Congress can be found at the Special Collections Research Center at the College of William & Mary.

== See also ==
- List of members of the United States Congress who died in office (2000–present)#2000s
- Air Force Office of Special Investigations (AFOSI or OSI)

Senate of Virginia
Preceded by Fred Bateman	Virginia Senate, District 2; 1968–1983	Succeeded by Bobby Scott
U.S. House of Representatives
Preceded by Paul Trible	Member of the U.S. House of Representatives from Virginia's 1st congressional district 1983–2000	Succeeded by Jo Ann Davis
