= 2012 United States House of Representatives elections in Virginia =

- November 6, 2012

All 11 Virginia seats to the United States House of Representatives
	Majority party	Minority party
Party	Republican	Democratic
Last election	8	3
Seats won	8	3
Seat change	Steady	Steady
Popular vote	1,876,760	1,806,025
Percentage	50.17%	48.28%
Swing	▼3.99%	▲6.67%

Republican
50–60%
60–70%
70–80%
80–90%
Democratic
40–50%
50–60%
60–70%
70–80%
80–90%
90–100%

The 2012 United States House of Representatives elections in Virginia were held on Tuesday, November 6, 2012, to elect the 11 U.S. representatives from Virginia, one from each of the state's 11 congressional districts. Representatives are elected for two-year terms; those elected would serve in the 113th Congress from January 2013 until January 2015. The elections coincided with the elections of other federal and state offices, including a quadrennial presidential election, and a U.S. Senate election.

== Overview ==
United States House of Representatives elections in Virginia, 2012
Party	Votes	Percentage	Seats before	Seats after	+/–
Republican	1,876,760	50.17%	8	8	-
Democratic	1,806,025	48.28%	3	3	-
Independent Greens	21,712	0.58%	0	0	-
Green	2,195	0.06%	0	0	-
Independents/Write-In	33,762	0.90%	0	0	-
Totals	3,740,455	100.00%	11	11	-

== District 1 ==
2012 Virginia's 1st congressional district election
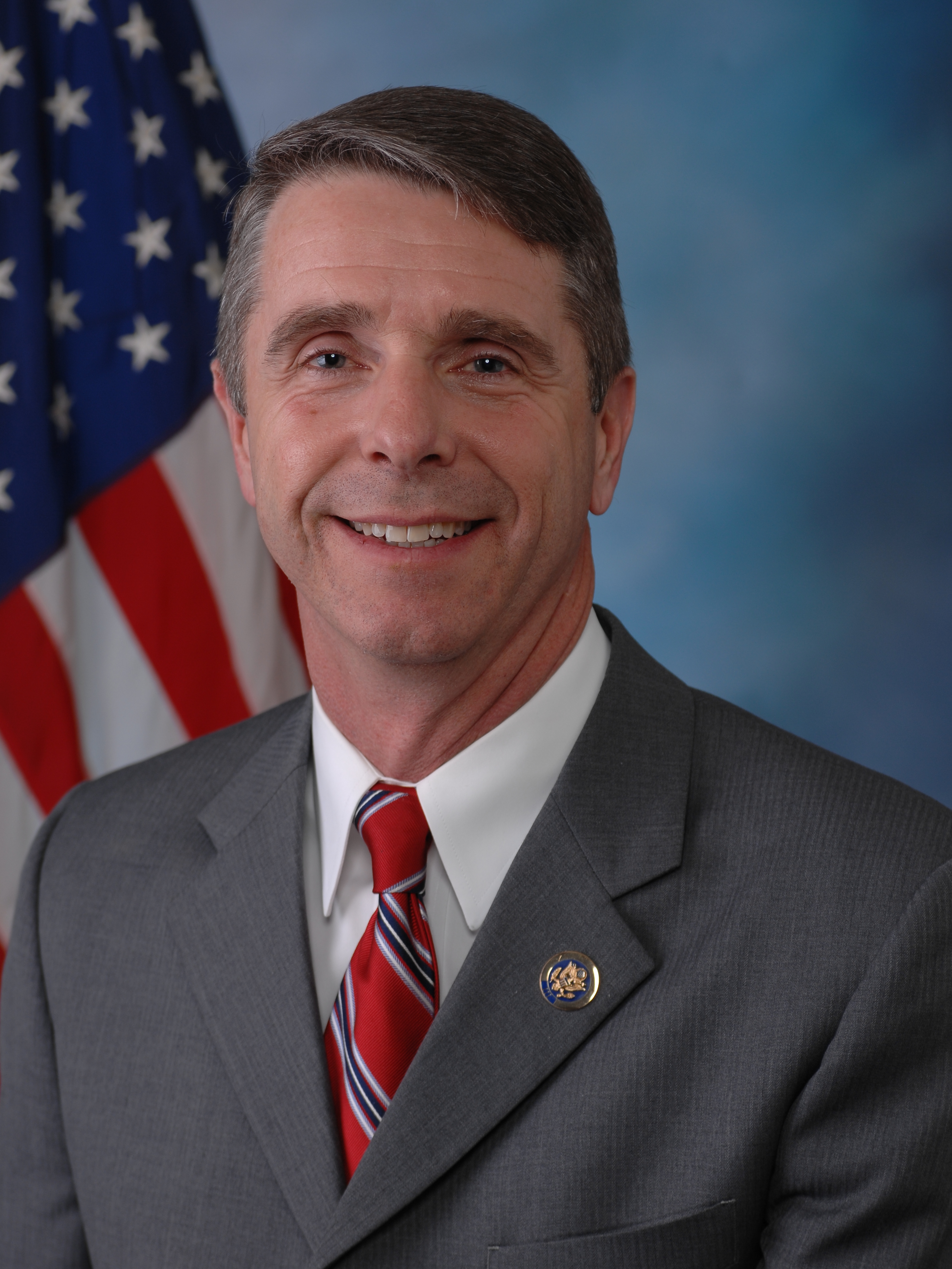

Candidate	Rob Wittman	Adam Cook
Party	Republican	Democratic
Popular vote	200,845	147,036
Percentage	56.3%	41.2%
- County and independent city results Wittman: 50–60% 60–70% 80–90% Cook: 40–50% 50–60% 60–70%
U.S. Representative before election
Rob Wittman
Republican
Elected U.S. Representative
Rob Wittman
Republican

Republican Rob Wittman, who had represented the 1st District since December 2007, ran for re-election.

=== Republican primary ===
==== Candidates ====
===== Nominee =====
- Rob Wittman, incumbent U.S. representative

=== Democratic primary ===
==== Candidates ====
===== Nominee =====
- Adam Cook, lawyer and Air Force reservist

=== Independent Greens primary ===
Gail Parker was the nominee of the Independent Greens of Virginia.

=== General election ===
==== Endorsements ====
Rob Wittman (R)

Organizations

- Americans for Legal Immigration
- Campaign for Working Families
- National Right to Life Committee
- NRA Political Victory Fund
- United States Chamber of Commerce

Newspapers

- Richmond Times-Dispatch
Adam Cook (D)

U.S. senators

- Mark Warner, U.S. senator (2009−present)

Labor unions

- Amalgamated Transit Union

Organizations

- VoteVets

==== Predictions ====
Source	Ranking	As of
The Cook Political Report	Safe R	November 5, 2012
Rothenberg	Safe R	November 2, 2012
Roll Call	Safe R	November 4, 2012
Sabato's Crystal Ball	Safe R	November 5, 2012
NY Times	Safe R	November 4, 2012
RCP	Safe R	November 4, 2012
The Hill	Safe R	November 4, 2012

==== Results ====
Virginia's 1st Congressional District election, 2012
Party	Candidate	Votes	%
Republican	Rob Wittman (incumbent)	200,845	56.29
Democratic	Adam Cook	147,036	41.21
Independent Greens	Gail Parker	8,308	2.31
Write-in		617	0.17
Majority			
Total votes		356,806	100.0
Republican hold			

External links

- Financial information (federal office) at the Federal Election Commission
- Profile at Vote Smart

== District 2 ==
2012 Virginia's 2nd congressional district election
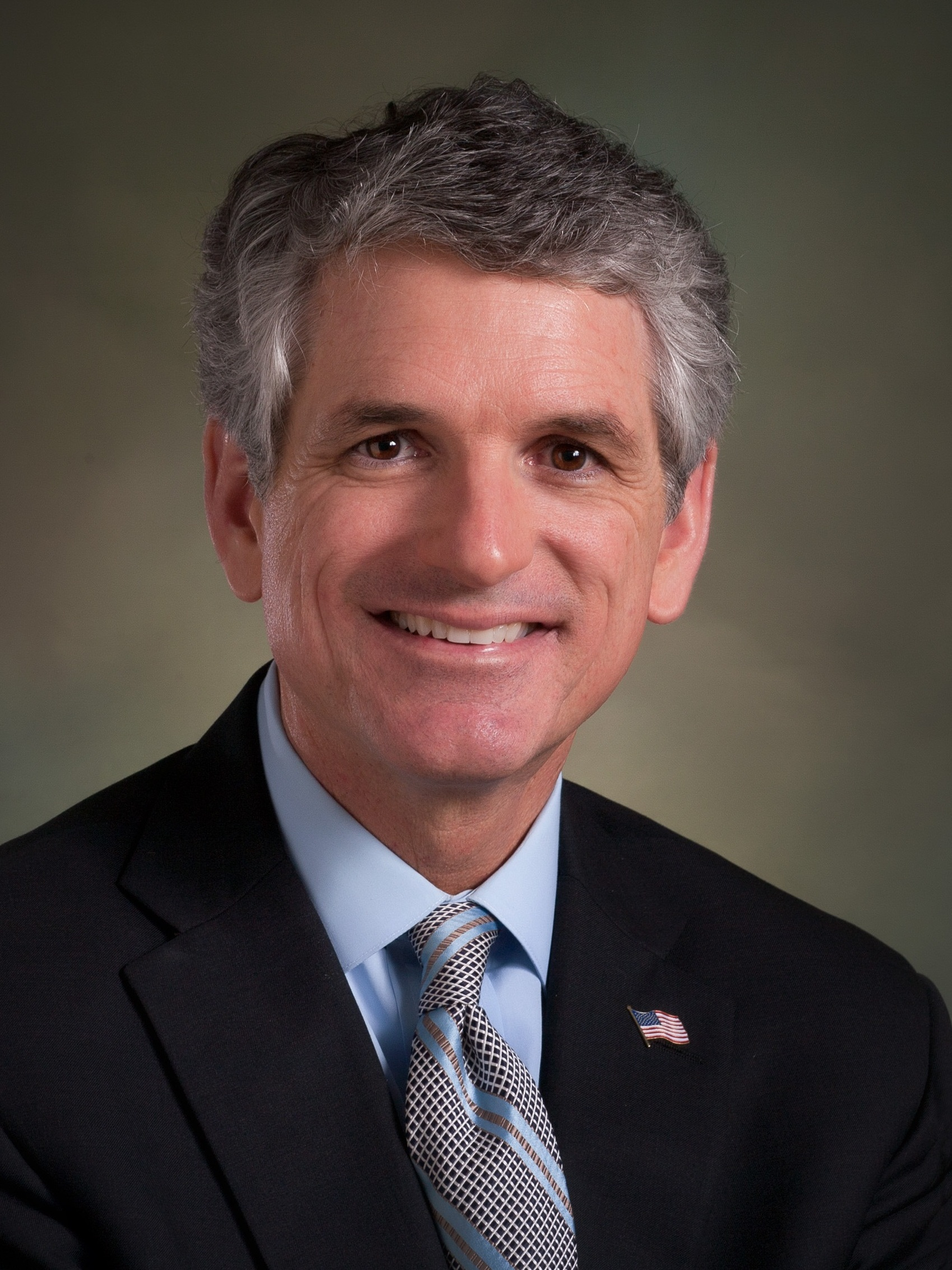

Candidate	Scott Rigell	Paul Hirschbiel
Party	Republican	Democratic
Popular vote	166,231	142,548
Percentage	53.8%	46.1%
- County and independent city results Rigell: 50–60% Hirschbiel: 50–60%
U.S. Representative before election
Scott Rigell
Republican
Elected U.S. Representative
Scott Rigell
Republican

Republican Scott Rigell, who had represented the 2nd District since January 2011, ran for re-election.

=== Republican primary ===
==== Candidates ====
===== Nominee =====
- Scott Rigell, incumbent U.S. representative

=== Democratic primary ===
==== Candidates ====
===== Nominee =====
- Paul Hirschbiel, businessman

===== Declined =====
- Glenn Nye, former U.S. representative

=== General election ===
==== Endorsements ====
Scott Rigell (R)

Organizations

- Eagle Forum
- National Right to Life Committee
- NRA Political Victory Fund
- United States Chamber of Commerce
Paul Hirschbiel (D)

Labor unions

- National Association of Letter Carriers

Organizations

- League of Conservation Voters
- Sierra Club

==== Polling ====
Poll source	Date(s) administered	Sample size (Note: Key: A – all adults RV – registered voters LV – likely voters V – unclear)	Margin of error	Scott Rigell (R)	Paul Hirschbiel (D)	Undecided
Muhlenberg College Institute of Public Opinion	October 1–2, 2012	766	±3.5%	44%	32%	24%
Public Opinion Strategies (R-Rigell)	October 1–2, 2012	400	±4.9%	54%	39%	15%
Benenson Strategy Group (D-Hirschbiel)	September 20–23, 2012	400	±4.9%	49%	40%	11%

==== Predictions ====
Source	Ranking	As of
The Cook Political Report	Likely R	November 5, 2012
Rothenberg	Likely R	November 2, 2012
Roll Call	Likely R	November 4, 2012
Sabato's Crystal Ball	Likely R	November 5, 2012
NY Times	Lean R	November 4, 2012
RCP	Likely R	November 4, 2012
The Hill	Lean R	November 4, 2012

==== Results ====
Virginia's 2nd Congressional District election, 2012
Party	Candidate	Votes	%
Republican	Scott Rigell (incumbent)	166,231	53.76
Democratic	Paul Hirschbiel	142,548	46.10
Write-in		443	0.14
Majority			
Total votes		309,222	100
Republican hold			

External links
Paul Hirschbiel

- Financial information (federal office) at the Federal Election Commission
- Profile at Vote Smart

== District 3 ==
2012 Virginia's 3rd congressional district election
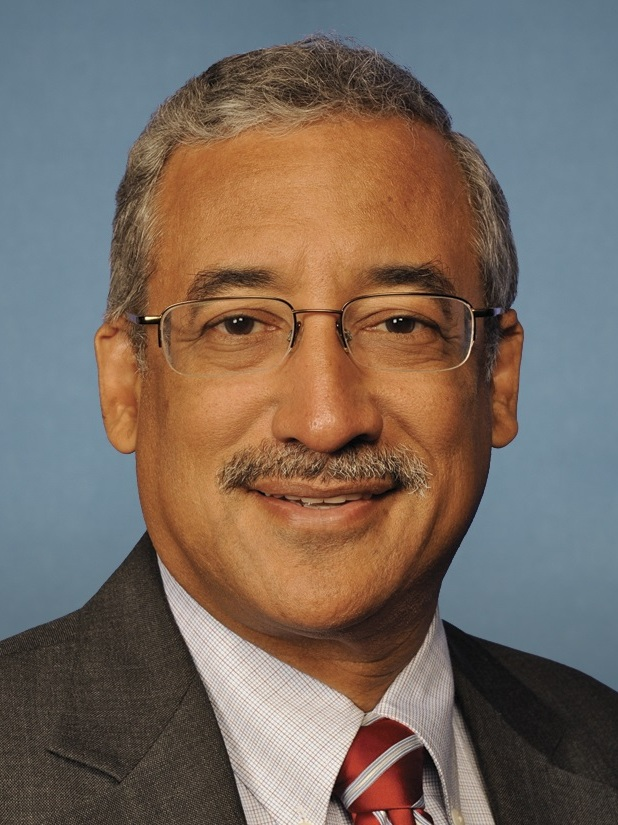

Candidate	Bobby Scott	Dean Longo
Party	Democratic	Republican
Popular vote	259,199	58,931
Percentage	81.3%	18.5%
- County and independent city results Scott: 60–70% 70–80% 80–90% >90% Longo: 50–60%
U.S. Representative before election
Bobby Scott
Democratic
Elected U.S. Representative
Bobby Scott
Democratic

Democrat Bobby Scott, who had represented the 3rd District since 1993, ran for re-election.

=== Democratic primary ===
==== Candidates ====
===== Nominee =====
- Bobby Scott, incumbent U.S. representative

=== Republican primary ===
==== Candidates ====
===== Nominee =====
- Dean Longo, businessman and retired Air Force lieutenant colonel

=== General election ===
==== Endorsements ====
Bobby Scott (D)

Labor unions

- Amalgamated Transit Union
- National Association of Letter Carriers
- National Education Association
- United Steelworkers

Organizations

- Humane Society of the United States
- Planned Parenthood Action Fund
- Sierra Club

Newspapers

- Richmond Times-Dispatch

==== Predictions ====
Source	Ranking	As of
The Cook Political Report	Safe D	November 5, 2012
Rothenberg	Safe D	November 2, 2012
Roll Call	Safe D	November 4, 2012
Sabato's Crystal Ball	Safe D	November 5, 2012
NY Times	Safe D	November 4, 2012
RCP	Safe D	November 4, 2012
The Hill	Safe D	November 4, 2012

==== Results ====
Virginia's 3rd Congressional District election, 2012
Party	Candidate	Votes	%
Democratic	Bobby Scott (incumbent)	259,199	81.27
Republican	Dean Longo	58,931	18.48
Write-in		806	0.25
Total votes		318,936	100
Democratic hold			

== District 4 ==
2012 Virginia's 4th congressional district election
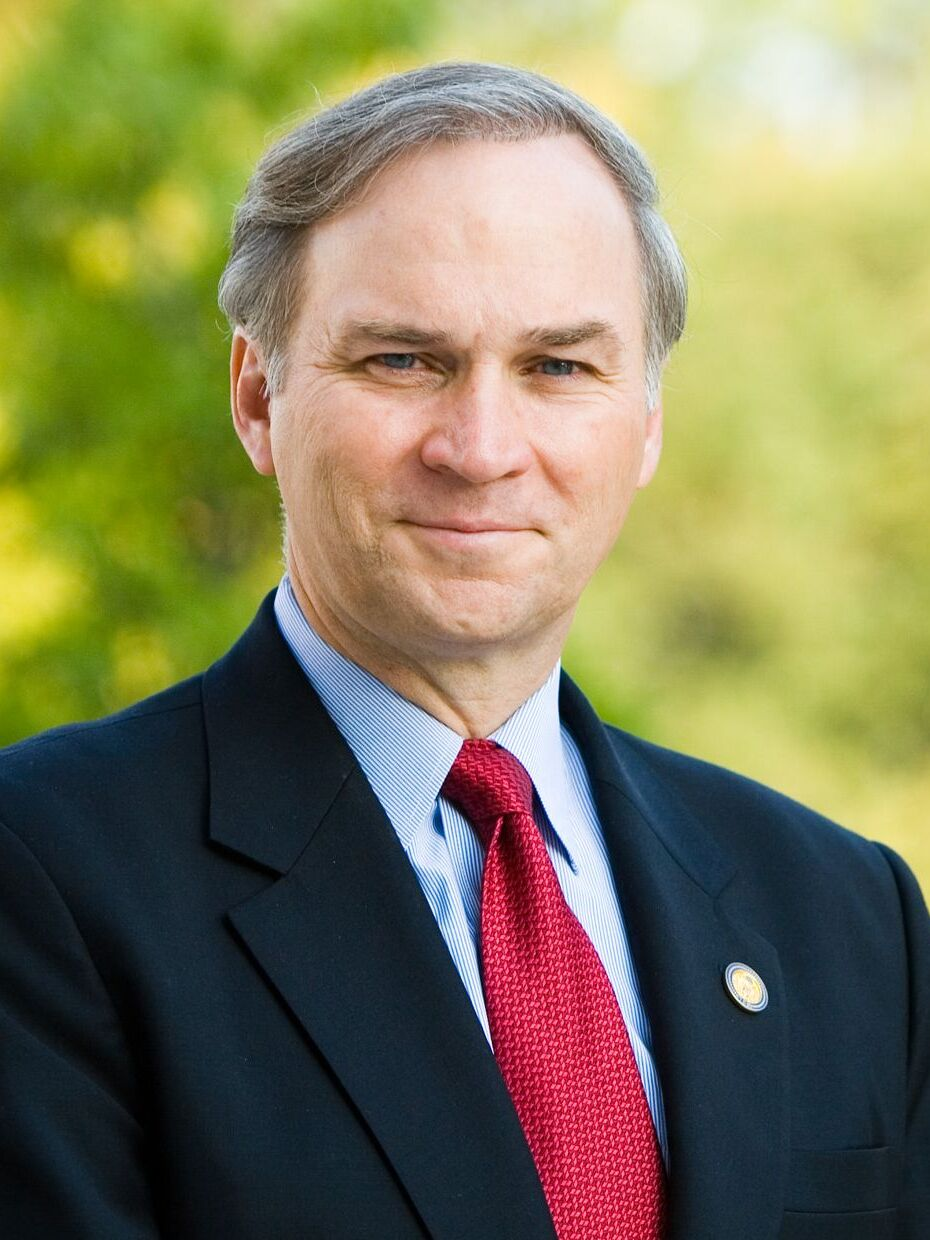

Candidate	Randy Forbes	Ella Ward
Party	Republican	Democratic
Popular vote	199,292	150,190
Percentage	56.9%	42.9%
- County and independent city results Forbes: 50–60% 60–70% 70–80% Ward: 50–60%
U.S. Representative before election
Randy Forbes
Republican
Elected U.S. Representative
Randy Forbes
Republican

Republican Randy Forbes, who had represented the 4th District since 2001, ran for re-election.

=== Republican primary ===
==== Candidates ====
===== Nominee =====
- Randy Forbes, incumbent U.S. representative

===== Eliminated in primary =====
- Bonnie Girard, businesswoman

==== Primary results ====
Republican primary results
Party	Candidate	Votes	%
Republican	Randy Forbes (incumbent)	26,294	89.7
Republican	Bonnie Girard	3,017	10.3
Total votes		29,311	100.0

=== Democratic primary ===
==== Candidates ====
===== Nominee =====
- Ella Ward, Chesapeake City Council member

===== Eliminated in primary =====
- Joe Elliott, minister from Surry

==== Primary results ====
Democratic primary results
Party	Candidate	Votes	%
Democratic	Ella Ward	5,364	84.5
Democratic	Joe Elliott	982	15.5
Total votes		6,346	100.0

=== General election ===
==== Endorsements ====
Randy Forbes (R)

Organizations

- American Conservative Union
- Americans for Legal Immigration
- Campaign for Working Families
- National Right to Life Committee
- NRA Political Victory Fund
- United States Chamber of Commerce

Newspapers

- Richmond Times-Dispatch
Ella Ward (D)

Labor unions

- Amalgamated Transit Union

Organizations

- Sierra Club

==== Predictions ====
Source	Ranking	As of
The Cook Political Report	Safe R	November 5, 2012
Rothenberg	Safe R	November 2, 2012
Roll Call	Safe R	November 4, 2012
Sabato's Crystal Ball	Safe R	November 5, 2012
NY Times	Safe R	November 4, 2012
RCP	Safe R	November 4, 2012
The Hill	Safe R	November 4, 2012

==== Results ====
Virginia's 4th Congressional District election, 2012
Party	Candidate	Votes	%
Republican	Randy Forbes (incumbent)	199,292	56.93
Democratic	Ella Ward	150,190	42.91
Write-in		564	0.16
Total votes		350,046	100
Republican hold			

== District 5 ==
2012 Virginia's 5th congressional district election
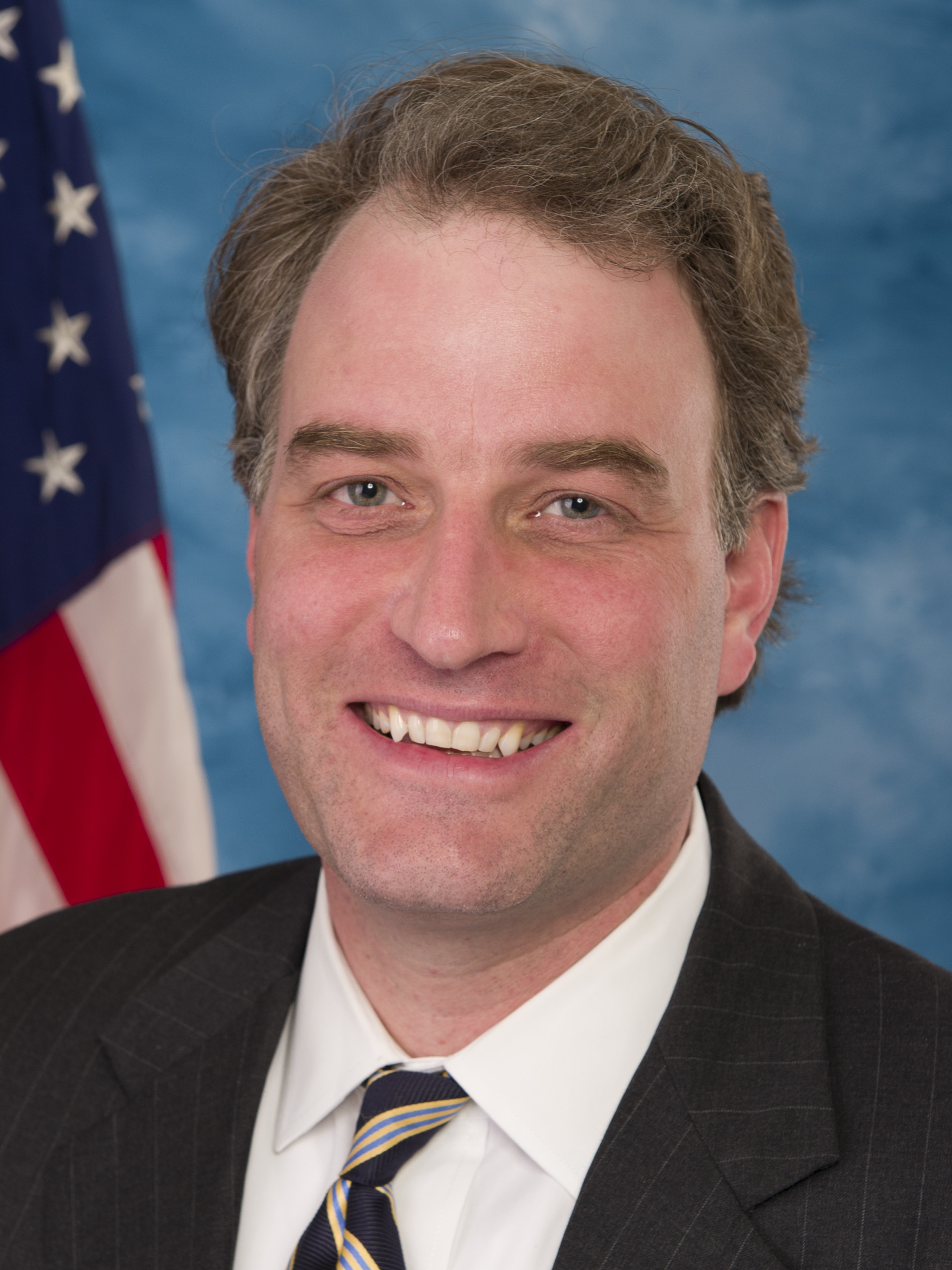

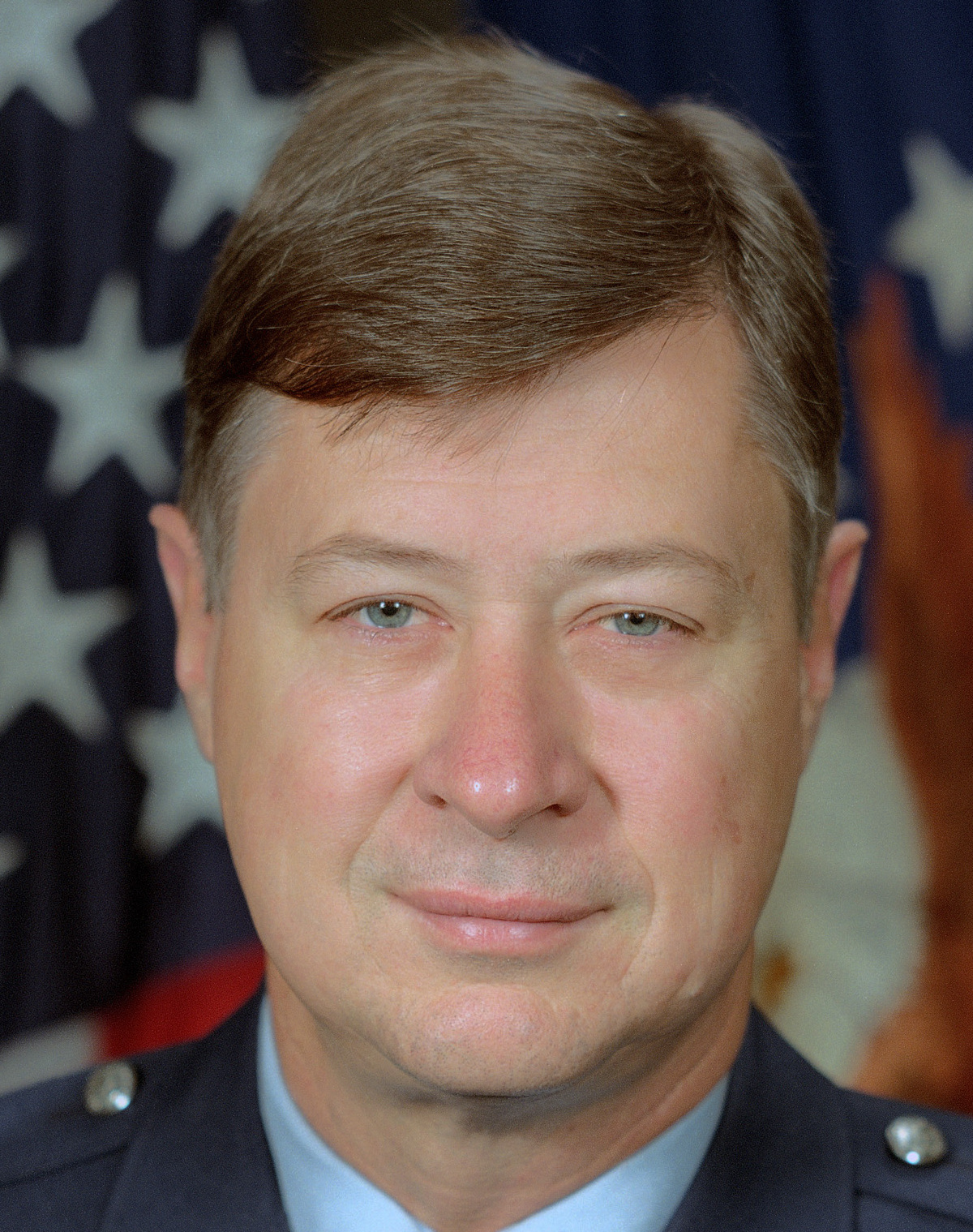
Candidate	Robert Hurt	John W. Douglass
Party	Republican	Democratic
Popular vote	193,009	149,214
Percentage	55.4%	42.9%
- County and independent city results Hurt: 50–60% 60–70% 70–80% Douglass: 50–60% 70–80%
U.S. Representative before election
Robert Hurt
Republican
Elected U.S. Representative
Robert Hurt
Republican

Republican Robert Hurt, who had represented the 5th District since January 2011, ran for re-election.

=== Republican primary ===
==== Candidates ====
===== Nominee =====
- Robert Hurt, incumbent U.S. representative

=== Democratic primary ===
John Douglass defeated Peyton Williams in a series of caucuses for the Democratic nomination.

==== Candidates ====
===== Nominee =====
- John Douglass, retired United States Air Force brigadier general and former Assistant Secretary of the Navy

===== Eliminated in primary =====
- Peyton Williams, defense systems engineer and retired Army Special Forces lieutenant colonel

===== Declined =====
- Tom Perriello, former U.S. representative

=== Independent Greens primary ===
Kenneth J. Hildebrandt was the nominee of the Independent Greens of Virginia.

=== General election ===
==== Endorsements ====
Robert Hurt (R)

Organizations

- Campaign for Working Families
- National Federation of Independent Business
- National Right to Life Committee
- NRA Political Victory Fund
- United States Chamber of Commerce

Newspapers

- Richmond Times-Dispatch
John Douglass (D)

Executive branch officials

- Bill Clinton, former president of the United States
- William J. Perry, former United States Secretary of Defense

U.S. senators

- Mark Warner, U.S. senator (2009-present)
- Jim Webb, U.S. senator (2007-present)

U.S. representatives

- Tom Perriello, representative for Virginia's 5th congressional district (2009–2011)
- Joe Sestak, representative for Pennsylvania's 7th congressional district (2007–2011) and nominee for the Senate in 2010

State legislators

- Creigh Deeds, state senator and nominee for governor in 2009
- David Toscano, state representative

Labor unions

- Amalgamated Transit Union
- National Education Association

Organizations

- Citizens for Global Solutions
- Sierra Club
- Veterans' Alliance for Security and Democracy
- VoteVets

Individuals

- Terry McAuliffe, former DNC chair
- William Owens, former Vice Chairman of the Joint Chiefs of Staff

==== Predictions ====
Source	Ranking	As of
The Cook Political Report	Likely R	November 5, 2012
Rothenberg	Safe R	November 2, 2012
Roll Call	Safe R	November 4, 2012
Sabato's Crystal Ball	Likely R	November 5, 2012
NY Times	Safe R	November 4, 2012
RCP	Safe R	November 4, 2012
The Hill	Safe R	November 4, 2012

==== Results ====
Virginia's 5th Congressional District election, 2012
Party	Candidate	Votes	%
Republican	Robert Hurt (incumbent)	193,009	55.44
Democratic	John Douglass	149,214	42.86
Independent Greens	Kenneth Hildebrandt	5,500	1.58
Write-in		388	0.11
Total votes		348,111	100
Republican hold			

== District 6 ==
2012 Virginia's 6th congressional district election
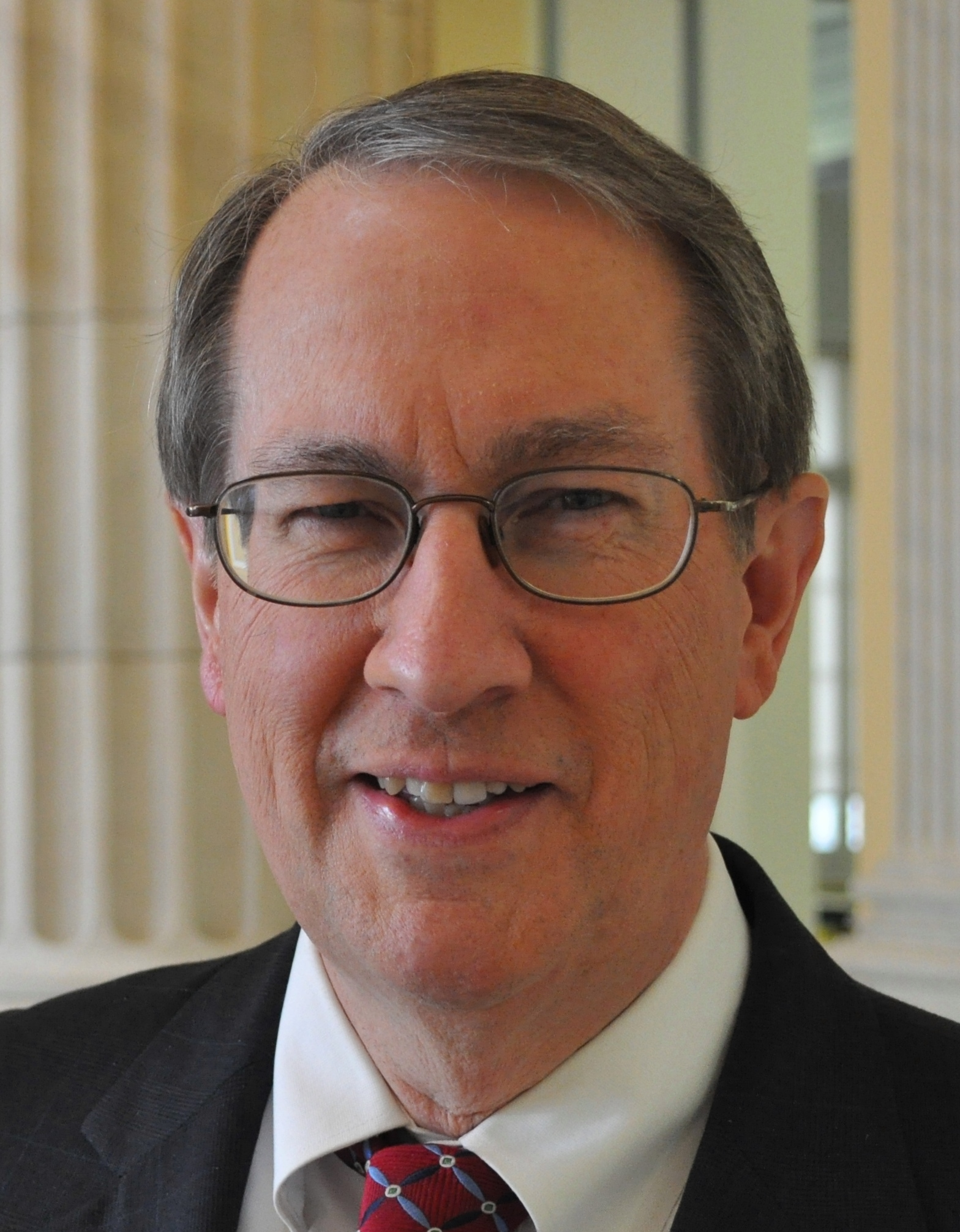

Nominee	Bob Goodlatte	Andy Schmookler
Party	Republican	Democratic
Popular vote	211,278	111,949
Percentage	65.2%	34.6%
- County and independent city results Goodlatte: 50–60% 60–70% 70–80% Schmookler: 50–60%
U.S. Representative before election
Bob Goodlatte
Republican
Elected U.S. Representative
Bob Goodlatte
Republican

Republican Bob Goodlatte, who had represented the 6th District since 1993, ran for re-election.

=== Republican primary ===
==== Candidates ====
===== Nominee =====
- Bob Goodlatte, incumbent U.S. representative

===== Eliminated in primary =====
- Karen Kwiatkowski, farmer and retired Air Force lieutenant colonel

==== Primary results ====
County and independent city results Goodlatte: 50–60%; 60–70%; 70–80%; 80–90%; Kwiatkowski: 50–60%

Republican primary results
Party	Candidate	Votes	%
Republican	Bob Goodlatte (incumbent)	21,808	66.5
Republican	Karen Kwiatkowski	10,991	33.5
Total votes		32,799	100.0

=== Democratic primary ===
==== Candidates ====
===== Nominee =====
- Andy Schmookler, author and radio talk show host

=== General election ===
==== Endorsements ====
Bob Goodlatte (R)

Organizations

- Americans for Legal Immigration
- Campaign for Working Families
- National Right to Life Committee
- NRA Political Victory Fund
- United States Chamber of Commerce
Andy Schmookler (D)

Labor unions

- Amalgamated Transit Union

Organizations

- Sierra Club

==== Predictions ====
Source	Ranking	As of
The Cook Political Report	Safe R	November 5, 2012
Rothenberg	Safe R	November 2, 2012
Roll Call	Safe R	November 4, 2012
Sabato's Crystal Ball	Safe R	November 5, 2012
NY Times	Safe R	November 4, 2012
RCP	Safe R	November 4, 2012
The Hill	Safe R	November 4, 2012

==== Results ====
Virginia's 6th Congressional District election, 2012
Party	Candidate	Votes	%
Republican	Bob Goodlatte (inc.)	211,278	65.23
Democratic	Andy Schmookler	111,949	34.56
Write-in		666	0.21
Total votes		323,893	100
Republican hold			

External links

- Point/Counterpoint: Meet your congressional candidates: 6th district, Roanoke Times, September 23, 2012

== District 7 ==
2012 Virginia's 7th congressional district election
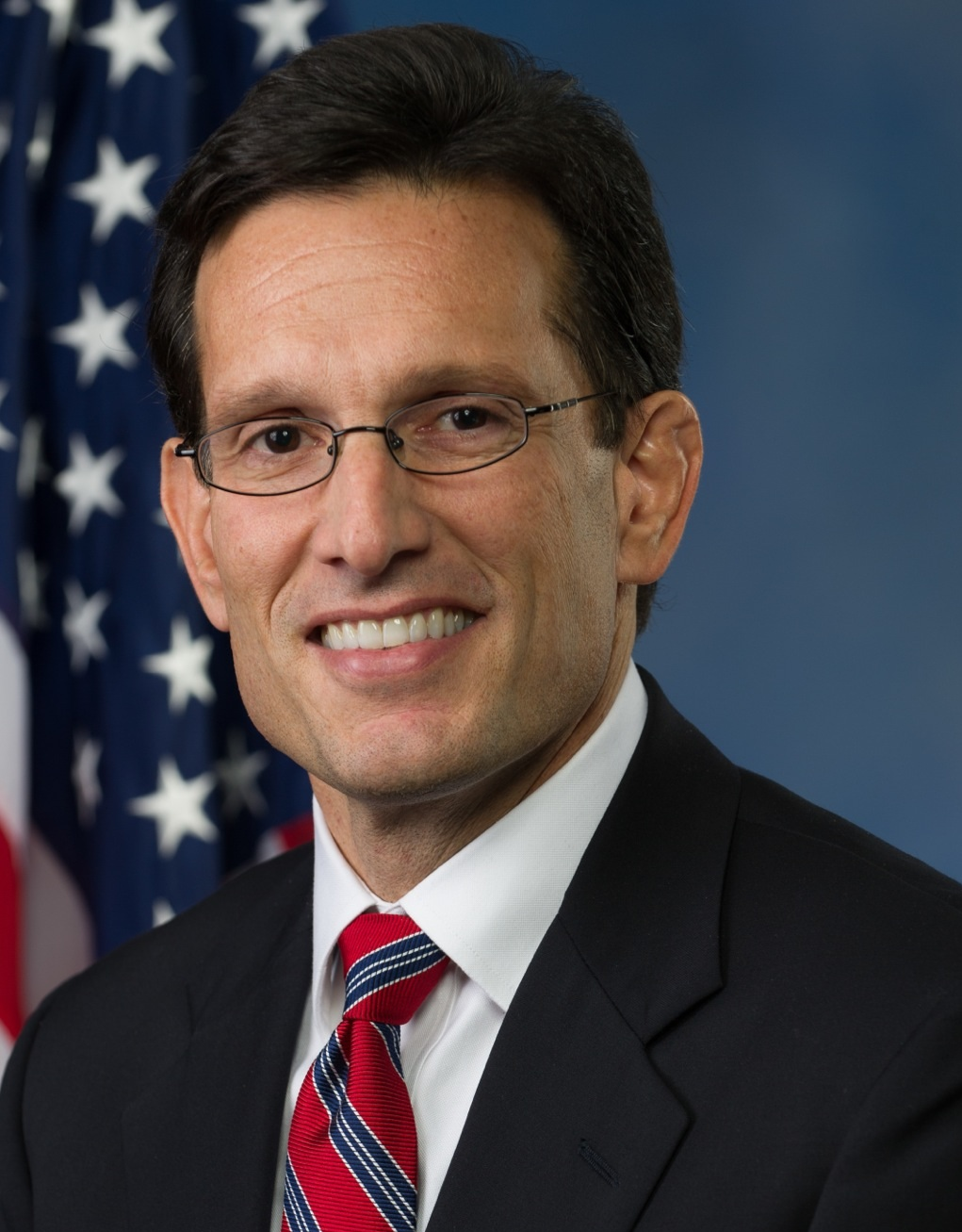

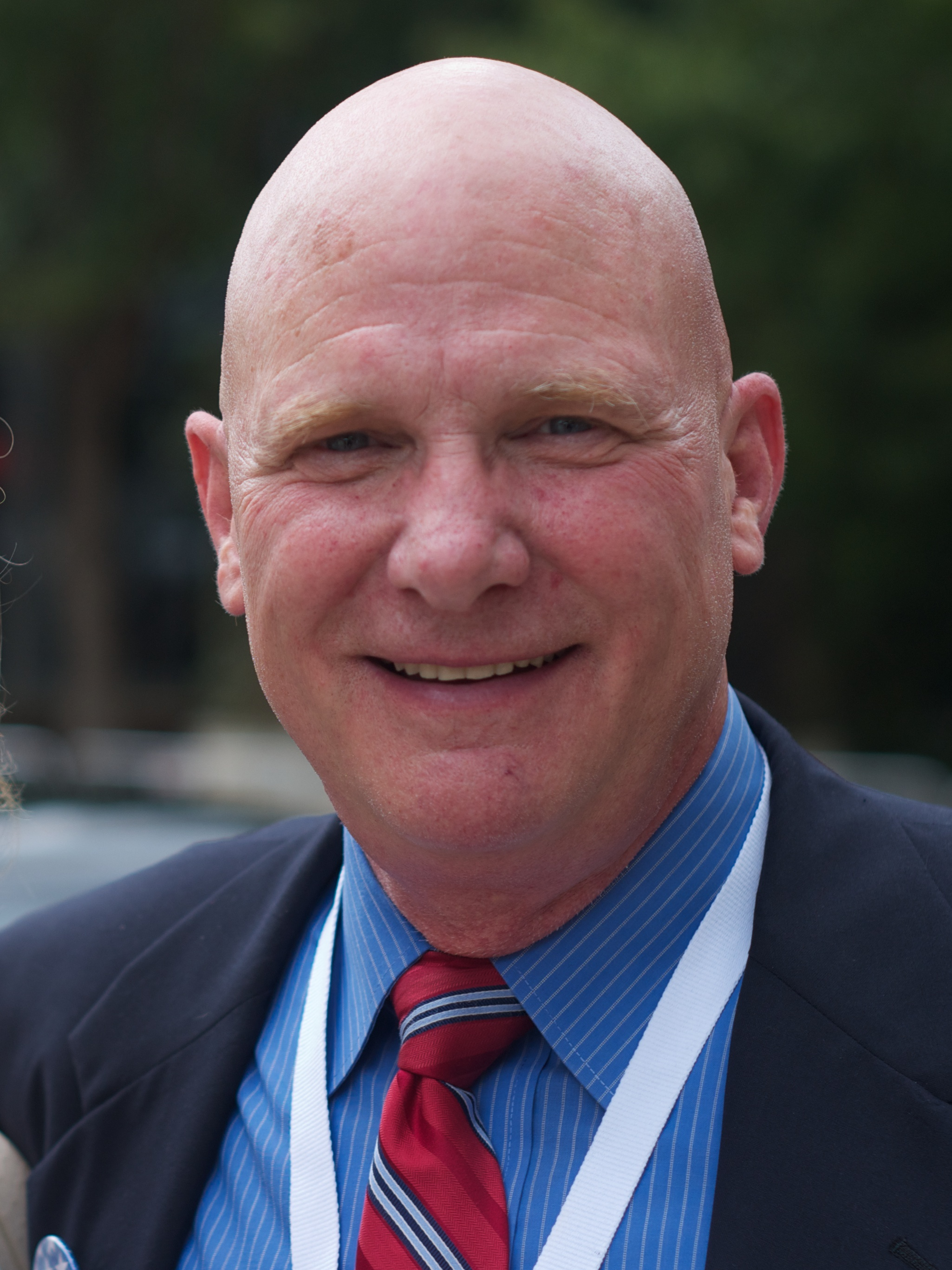
Candidate	Eric Cantor	Wayne Powell
Party	Republican	Democratic
Popular vote	222,983	158,012
Percentage	58.4%	41.4%
- County and independent city results Cantor: 50–60% 60–70% Powell: 50–60%
U.S. Representative before election
Eric Cantor
Republican
Elected U.S. Representative
Eric Cantor
Republican

Republican Eric Cantor, the U.S. House Majority Leader who had represented the 7th District since 2001, ran for re-election.

=== Republican primary ===
==== Candidates ====
===== Nominee =====
- Eric Cantor, incumbent U.S. representative

===== Eliminated in primary =====
- Floyd Bayne, Independent Green candidate for this seat in 2010

==== Primary results ====
Republican primary results
Party	Candidate	Votes	%
Republican	Eric Cantor (incumbent)	37,369	79.4
Republican	Floyd Bayne	9,668	20.6
Total votes		47,037	100.0

=== Democratic primary ===
==== Candidates ====
===== Nominee =====
- Wayne Powell, lawyer and former Army officer

===== Withdrawn =====
- David Hunsicker, real estate businessman and Vietnam War veteran

=== Independents ===
Vivek Jain, a medical doctor affiliated with the Occupy movement, ran as an independent.

=== General election ===
==== Endorsements ====
Eric Cantor (R)

Organizations

- Campaign for Working Families
- National Right to Life Committee
- NRA Political Victory Fund
- United States Chamber of Commerce
Wayne Powell (D)

Labor unions

- Amalgamated Transit Union

Organizations

- National Organization for Women
- Progressive Democrats of America
- Sierra Club

==== Debates ====
- Complete video of debate, October 1, 2012

==== Predictions ====
Source	Ranking	As of
The Cook Political Report	Safe R	November 5, 2012
Rothenberg	Safe R	November 2, 2012
Roll Call	Safe R	November 4, 2012
Sabato's Crystal Ball	Safe R	November 5, 2012
NY Times	Safe R	November 4, 2012
RCP	Safe R	November 4, 2012
The Hill	Safe R	November 4, 2012

==== Results ====
Virginia's 7th Congressional District election, 2012
Party	Candidate	Votes	%
Republican	Eric Cantor (incumbent)	222,983	58.39
Democratic	Wayne Powell	158,012	41.37
Write-in		914	0.24
Total votes		381,909	100
Republican hold			

External links

- Campaign contributions at OpenSecrets'

Floyd Bayne

- Financial information (federal office) at the Federal Election Commission

Wayne Powell

- Financial information (federal office) at the Federal Election Commission
- Profile at Vote Smart

== District 8 ==
2012 Virginia's 8th congressional district election
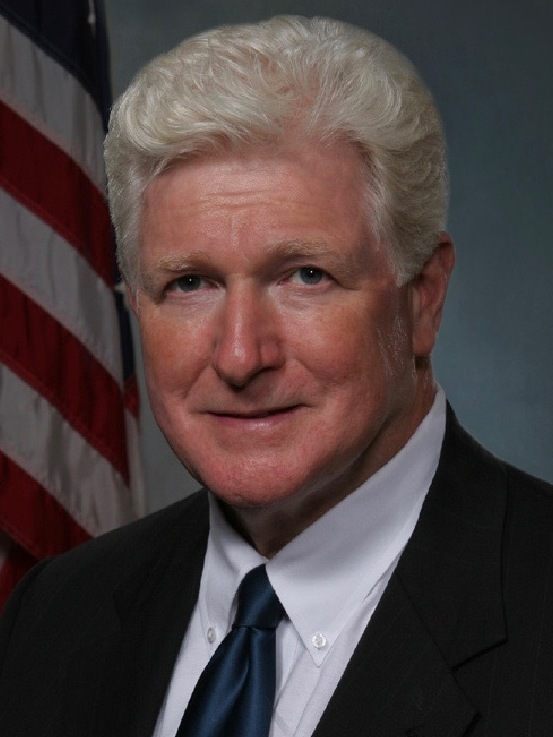

Candidate	Jim Moran	Jay Patrick Murray
Party	Democratic	Republican
Popular vote	226,847	107,370
Percentage	64.6%	30.6%
- County and independent city results Moran: 60–70%
U.S. Representative before election
Jim Moran
Democratic
Elected U.S. Representative
Jim Moran
Democratic

Democrat Jim Moran, who had represented the 8th District since 1991, ran for re-election.

=== Democratic primary ===
A controversy erupted when the Democratic Party of Virginia disqualified Moran's primary challenger, Shuttleworth, saying he had fallen 17 signatures short of the 1,000 threshold required. Shuttleworth filed a federal lawsuit; the party then changed course without explanation and allowed Shuttleworth on the ballot.

Moran won the primary against Shuttleworth by a sizable margin.

==== Candidates ====
===== Nominee =====
- Jim Moran, incumbent U.S. representative

===== Eliminated in primary =====
- Bruce Shuttleworth, business consultant and former Navy pilot

===== Withdrawn =====
- Will Radle, a financial advisor

==== Primary results ====
Democratic primary results
Party	Candidate	Votes	%
Democratic	Jim Moran (incumbent)	23,018	74.2
Democratic	Bruce Shuttleworth	8,006	25.8
Total votes		31,024	100.0

=== Republican primary ===
==== Candidates ====
===== Nominee =====
- Jay Patrick Murray, retired army colonel nominee for this seat in 2010

=== Independent Greens primary ===
Janet Murphy was the nominee of the Independent Greens of Virginia.

=== Independents ===
Jason Howell, accountant and author, ran as an Independent.

=== General election ===
==== Endorsements ====
Jim Moran (D)

Labor unions

- Amalgamated Transit Union
- National Association of Letter Carriers
- National Education Association
- United Steelworkers

Organizations

- Citizens for Global Solutions
- Humane Society of the United States
- LGBT Democrats
- National Organization for Women
- Planned Parenthood Action Fund
- Sierra Club
Jay Patrick Murray (R)

Organizations

- Iraq Veterans for Congress

==== Predictions ====
Source	Ranking	As of
The Cook Political Report	Safe D	November 5, 2012
Rothenberg	Safe D	November 2, 2012
Roll Call	Safe D	November 4, 2012
Sabato's Crystal Ball	Safe D	November 5, 2012
NY Times	Safe D	November 4, 2012
RCP	Safe D	November 4, 2012
The Hill	Safe D	November 4, 2012

==== Results ====
Virginia's 8th Congressional District election, 2012
Party	Candidate	Votes	%
Democratic	Jim Moran (incumbent)	226,847	64.59
Republican	Jay Patrick Murray	107,370	30.57
Independent	Jason Howell	10,180	2.90
Independent Greens	Janet Murphy	5,985	1.70
Write-in		805	0.23
Total votes		351,187	100
Democratic hold			

== District 9 ==
2012 Virginia's 9th congressional district election
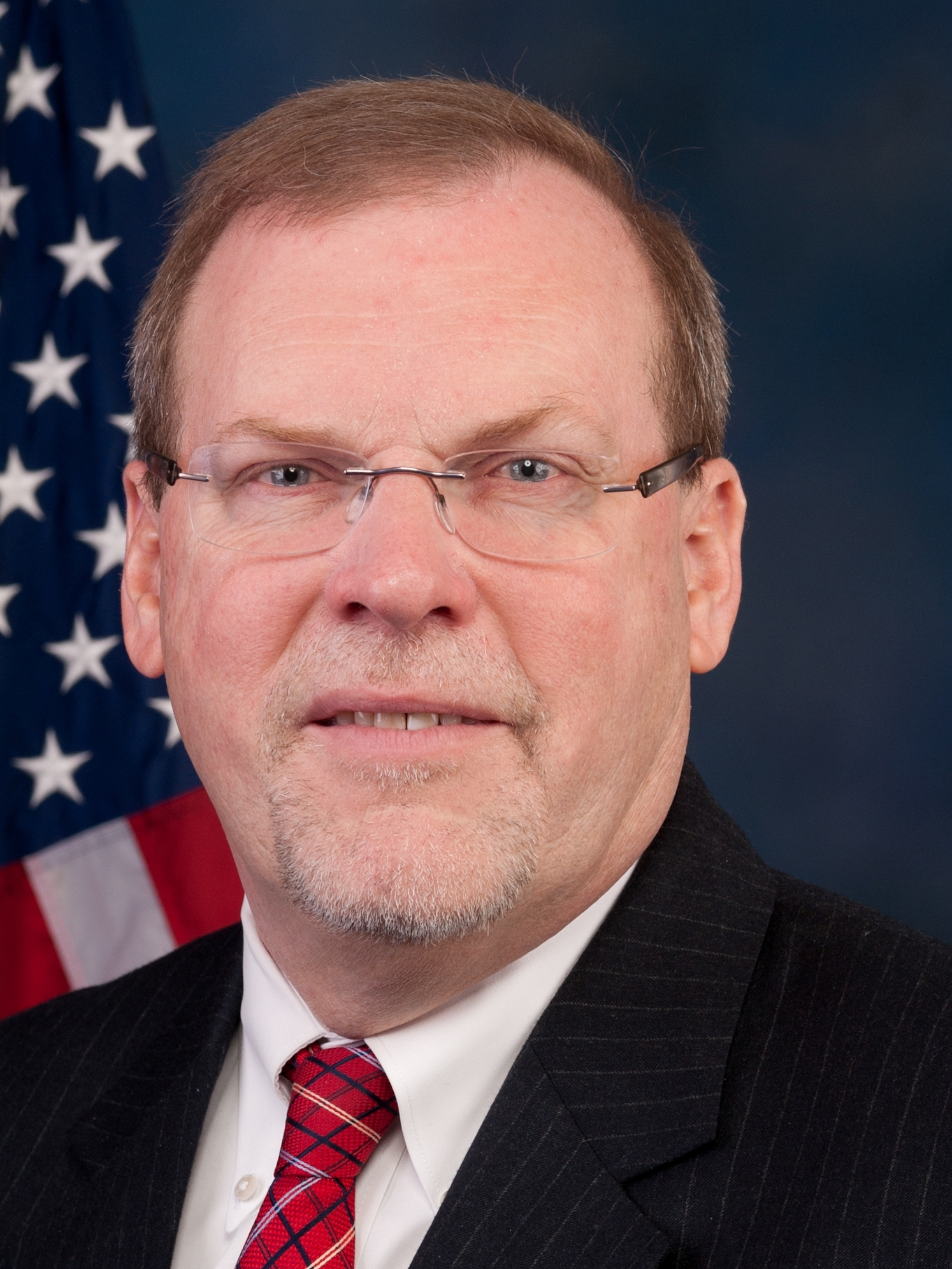

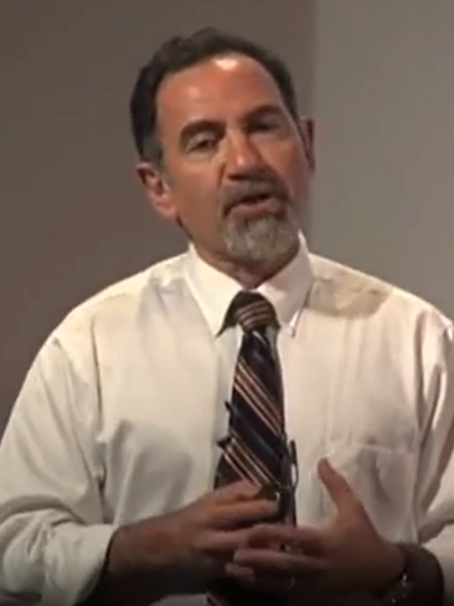
Nominee	Morgan Griffith	Anthony Flaccavento
Party	Republican	Democratic
Popular vote	184,882	116,400
Percentage	61.3%	38.6%
- County and independent city results Griffith: 50–60% 60–70% 70–80% Flaccavento: 50–60%
U.S. Representative before election
Morgan Griffith
Republican
Elected U.S. Representative
Morgan Griffith
Republican

Republican Morgan Griffith, who had represented the 9th District since January 2011, ran for re-election.

=== Republican primary ===
==== Candidates ====
===== Nominee =====
- Morgan Griffith, incumbent U.S. representative

=== Democratic primary ===
==== Candidates ====
===== Nominee =====
- Anthony Flaccavento, farmer and sustainability consultant

===== Withdrawn =====
- Jeremiah Heaton, Independent candidate for this seat in 2010
- Jim Werth, psychology professor at Radford University

=== General election ===
==== Endorsements ====
Morgan Griffith (R)

Labor unions

- National Association of Letter Carriers

Organizations

- Americans for Legal Immigration
- Campaign for Working Families
- Gun Owners of America
- National Right to Life Committee
- NRA Political Victory Fund
- United States Chamber of Commerce
Anthony Flaccavento (D)

Labor unions

- Amalgamated Transit Union

Organizations

- Citizens for Global Solutions
- LGBT Democrats

==== Predictions ====
Source	Ranking	As of
The Cook Political Report	Safe R	November 5, 2012
Rothenberg	Safe R	November 2, 2012
Roll Call	Safe R	November 4, 2012
Sabato's Crystal Ball	Safe R	November 5, 2012
NY Times	Safe R	November 4, 2012
RCP	Safe R	November 4, 2012
The Hill	Safe R	November 4, 2012

==== Results ====
Virginia's 9th Congressional District election, 2012
Party	Candidate	Votes	%
Republican	Morgan Griffith (incumbent)	184,882	61.29
Democratic	Anthony Flaccavento	116,400	38.59
Write-in		376	0.12
Total votes		301,658	100
Republican hold			

External links
Anthony Flaccavento

- Financial information (federal office) at the Federal Election Commission
- Profile at Vote Smart

== District 10 ==
2012 Virginia's 10th congressional district election
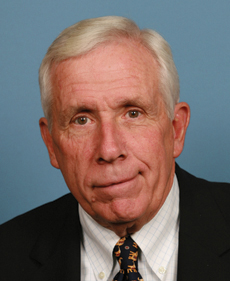

Candidate	Frank Wolf	Kristin Cabral
Party	Republican	Democratic
Popular vote	214,038	142,024
Percentage	58.8%	38.8%
- County and independent city results Wolf: 50–60% 60–70% 70–80% Cabral: 50–60%
U.S. Representative before election
Frank Wolf
Republican
Elected U.S. Representative
Frank Wolf
Republican

Republican Frank Wolf, who had represented the 10th District since 1981, ran for re-election.

=== Republican primary ===
==== Candidates ====
===== Nominee =====
- Frank Wolf, incumbent U.S. representative

=== Democratic primary ===
==== Candidates ====
===== Nominee =====
- Kristin Cabral, attorney

===== Withdrawn =====
- John Douglass, retired United States Air Force brigadier general and former Assistant Secretary of the Navy (running in the 5th district)

===== Declined =====
- Jeff Barnett, retired Air Force colonel and nominee for this seat in 2010.

=== Independents ===
Kevin Chisholm, an independent and practicing engineer, also qualified for the ballot as an independent candidate.

=== General election ===
==== Endorsements ====
Frank Wolf (R)

Organizations

- Campaign for Working Families
- Citizens for Global Solutions
- National Right to Life Committee
- NRA Political Victory Fund
- United States Chamber of Commerce
Kristin Cabral (D)

Labor unions

- Amalgamated Transit Union

Organizations

- LGBT Democrats
- National Organization for Women

==== Predictions ====
Source	Ranking	As of
The Cook Political Report	Safe R	November 5, 2012
Rothenberg	Safe R	November 2, 2012
Roll Call	Safe R	November 4, 2012
Sabato's Crystal Ball	Safe R	November 5, 2012
NY Times	Safe R	November 4, 2012
RCP	Safe R	November 4, 2012
The Hill	Safe R	November 4, 2012

==== Results ====
Virginia's 10th Congressional District election, 2012
Party	Candidate	Votes	%
Republican	Frank Wolf (incumbent)	214,038	58.41
Democratic	Kristin Cabral	142,024	38.76
Independent	Kevin Chisholm	9,855	2.69
Write-in		527	0.14
Total votes		366,444	100
Republican hold			

External links
Kristin Cabral

- Financial information (federal office) at the Federal Election Commission
- Profile at Vote Smart

Kevin Chisholm

- Financial information (federal office) at the Federal Election Commission
- Profile at Vote Smart

== District 11 ==
2012 Virginia's 11th congressional district election
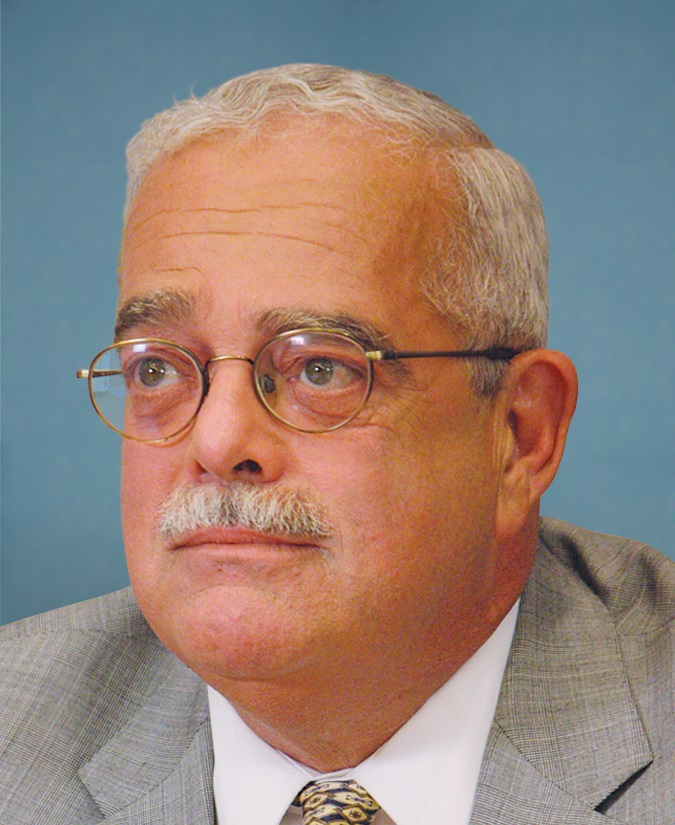

Nominee	Gerry Connolly	Christopher Perkins
Party	Democratic	Republican
Popular vote	202,606	117,902
Percentage	61.0%	35.5%
- County and independent city results Connolly: 50–60% 60–70%
U.S. Representative before election
Gerry Connolly
Democratic
Elected U.S. Representative
Gerry Connolly
Democratic

Democrat Gerry Connolly, who had represented the 11th District since 2009, ran for re-election. Connolly won the 2010 election by just 981 votes (0.4%).

=== Democratic primary ===
==== Candidates ====
===== Nominee =====
- Gerry Connolly, incumbent U.S. representative

=== Republican primary ===
==== Candidates ====
===== Nominee =====
- Christopher Perkins, retired Army colonel

===== Eliminated in primary =====
- Ken Vaughn, traffic engineer

===== Declined =====
- Keith Fimian, property inspection company founder and nominee for this seat in 2008 & 2010

==== Primary results ====
Republican primary results
Party	Candidate	Votes	%
Republican	Christopher Perkins	11,600	62.8
Republican	Ken Vaughn	6,866	37.2
Total votes		18,466	100.0

=== General election ===
==== Endorsements ====
Gerry Connolly (D)

Labor unions

- Amalgamated Transit Union
- National Association of Letter Carriers
- National Education Association
- United Steelworkers

Organizations

- Citizens for Global Solutions
- Humane Society of the United States
- J Street
- LGBT Democrats
- Planned Parenthood Action Fund
- Sierra Club
Christopher Perkins (R)

Organizations

- NRA Political Victory Fund

==== Predictions ====
Source	Ranking	As of
The Cook Political Report	Safe D	November 5, 2012
Rothenberg	Safe D	November 2, 2012
Roll Call	Safe D	November 4, 2012
Sabato's Crystal Ball	Safe D	November 5, 2012
NY Times	Safe D	November 4, 2012
RCP	Safe D	November 4, 2012
The Hill	Safe D	November 4, 2012

==== Results ====
Virginia's 11th Congressional District election, 2012
Party	Candidate	Votes	%
Democratic	Gerry Connolly (incumbent)	202,606	60.98
Republican	Christopher Perkins	117,902	35.49
Independent	Mark Gibson	3,806	1.15
Independent	Christopher DeCarlo	3,027	0.91
Green	Joe Galdo	2,195	0.66
Independent Greens	Peter Marchetti	1,919	0.58
Write-in		788	0.24
Total votes		332,243	100
Democratic hold			

== Notes ==
Official campaign websites
- District 1
  - Adam Cook campaign website
  - Rob Wittman campaign website
  - Gail Parker campaign website
- District 2
  - Paul Hirschbiel campaign website
  - Scott Rigell campaign website
- District 3
  - Dean Longo campaign website
  - Bobby Scott campaign website
- District 4
  - Joe Elliott campaign website
  - Randy Forbes campaign website
  - Bonnie Girard campaign website
  - Ella Ward campaign website
- District 5
  - John Douglass campaign website
  - Robert Hurt campaign website
  - Kenneth J. Hildebrandt campaign website
- District 6
  - Bob Goodlatte campaign website
  - Karen Kwiatkowski campaign website
  - Andy Schmookler campaign website
- District 7
  - Floyd Bayne campaign website
  - Eric Cantor campaign website
  - Vivek Jain campaign website
  - Wayne Powell campaign website
- District 8
  - Jim Moran campaign website
  - Patrick Murray campaign website
  - Bruce Shuttleworth campaign website
  - Jason Howell campaign website
- District 9
  - Morgan Griffith campaign website
- District 10
  - Kristin Cabral campaign website
  - Frank Wolf campaign website
  - Kevin Chisholm campaign website
- District 11
  - Gerry Connolly campaign website
  - Christopher Perkins campaign website
  - Joe Galdo campaign website
  - Ken Vaughn campaign website
