= 2010 Virginia's 8th congressional district election =

Virginia's 8th congressional district election, 2010
- November 2, 2010
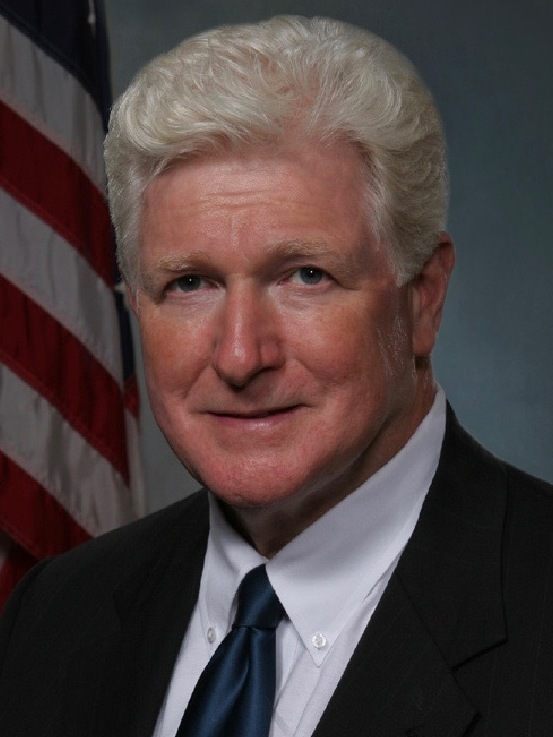

Candidate	Jim Moran	Jay Patrick Murray
Party	Democratic	Republican
Popular vote	116,293	71,108
Percentage	61.01%	37.31%
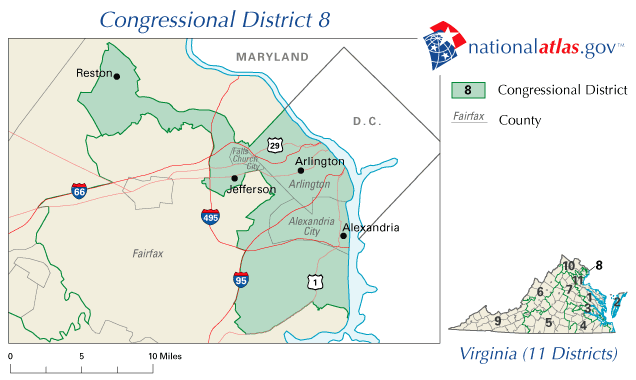
- Virginia's 8th congressional district
Representative before election
Jim Moran
Democratic
Elected Representative
Jim Moran
Democratic

Virginia's 8th congressional district election, 2010 was an election held to determine who would represent Virginia's 8th congressional district in the United States House of Representatives during the 112th Congress. The seat contested is located in Northern Virginia, and includes part of Fairfax County, the city of Alexandria, and all of Arlington County. Since 1990, the 8th district had been represented by 10-term Democratic incumbent Jim Moran.

== Background ==
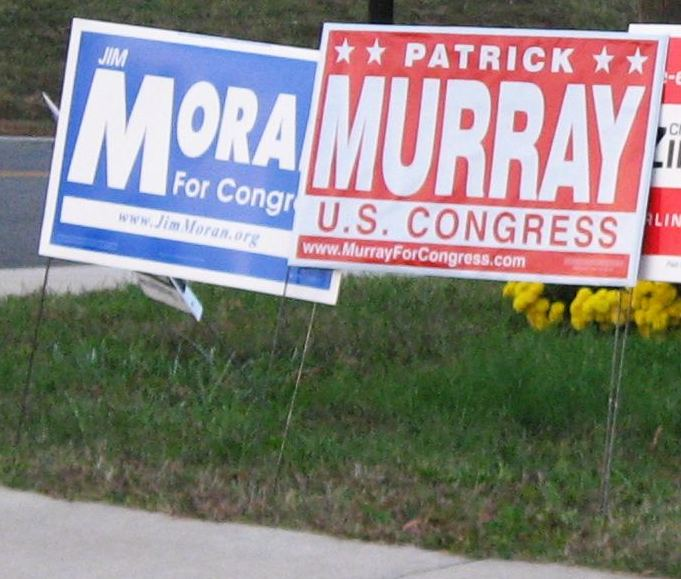
Campaign signs

The district is represented currently by Jim Moran, a former mayor of Alexandria and Democrat, who won the 8th congressional district in 1990 and has been reelected in every election since. The district usually favors Democratic candidates. In the 2000 presidential election, the district was won by Democrat Al Gore. In the 2004 presidential election, it was won by Democrat John Kerry. In the 2008 presidential election, it was won by Democrat Barack Obama. Moran has defeated every Republican challenger in large victories.

One Democrat, Ronald Mitchell, filed to challenge Moran for the Democratic nomination and raised over $9,000, but failed to collect the minimum number of signatures required to be placed on the ballot and Moran was nominated. The Republican Party nomination was contested by attorney and former Federal Communications Commission general counsel Matthew Berry and retired U.S. Army Colonel Patrick Murray. Several other candidates had announced their intent to run, including 2008 nominee Mark Ellmore, but they all dropped out at different times, leaving the race to Berry and Murray. Murray narrowly won the June 8th Republican primary by a margin of 52%-48%.

Independent Green candidate and retired U.S. Navy Captain Ron Fisher was also on the ballot in 2010. He took two percent of the popular vote in 2008, and received 2,700 (1.41%) in 2010.

== Candidates ==
=== Democratic nomination ===
- Jim Moran, 10-term incumbent U.S. Representative
- Ronald Mitchell, failed to collect enough signatures to force a primary with Moran.

=== Republican nomination ===
- Matthew Berry, attorney and former general counsel of the Federal Communications Commission.
- Patrick Murray, retired U.S. Army Colonel.
- Mark Ellmore, the Republican nominee in 2008, announced in November 2009 that he would challenge Moran again. He dropped out of the race in March 2010 and supported Murray.
- Laurence Socci, dropped out of the race prior to the April filing deadline and supported Berry.
- Will Radle, left the race before the April 9 filing deadline. Briefly considered running as an independent, before supporting Murray.

==== Results ====
Republican Primary results
Party	Candidate	Votes	%
Republican	J. Patrick Murray	7,136	51.74
Republican	Matthew B. Berry	6,654	48.25
Total votes		13,790	100

== Polling ==
Source	Dates Administered	Jim Moran (D)	Patrick Murray (R)	Undecided/Other
Pollster unavailable, results via the Washington Post	October 2010	58%	31%	11%
McLaughlin & Associates	September 2010	45%	32%	23%

== General election ==
=== Campaign ===
The 8th district election received national attention in October 2010 because of remarks Moran made at a meeting of the Arlington County Democratic Committee on October 6, 2010:

What [Republicans] do is find candidates, usually stealth candidates, that haven't been in office, haven't served or performed in any kind of public service. My opponent is typical, frankly.

Moran defended his performance as a member of congress, saying in an interview with The Washington Post that "The message is that our unemployment rate is half what it is in the rest of the country. We've been judged the best place to ride out the recession... We have the strongest economy in the country, so we don't want to do a whole lot different than what we've been doing." He also attacked his opponent's views on social issues; saying that Murray's opposition to abortion and same-sex marriage was "out of the mainstream in Northern Virginia".

=== Fundraising ===
Candidate (Party)	Receipts	Disbursements	Cash On Hand	Debt
Jim Moran (D)	$1,312,117	$1,376,173	$424,891	$0
Patrick Murray (R)	$446,468	$442,922	$3,546	$45,000
Source: Federal Election Commission

=== Results ===
Virginia's 8th congressional district election, 2010
Party	Candidate	Votes	%
Democratic	Jim Moran	116,293	61.0
Republican	Patrick Murray	71,108	37.3
Independent Greens	J. Ron Fisher	2,704	1.4
Other	Write-in candidates	492	0.2
Total votes		233,368	100
Turnout		233,368 of 476,011	49.0
Democratic hold			

Moran easily won reelection on November 2, 2010; despite Republicans taking over the House of Representatives and several other Virginia Democratic incumbents losing their races. In his victory speech Moran said that "The politics of divisiveness and fear have gained ground on hope. We can make no mistake: the next two years are going to be very difficult". Moran also took a few final jabs at his defeated opponent, saying that the combined "lack of civic engagement" and "extremist Tea Party views" doomed Murray's candidacy.

Patrick Murray left open the possibility of another run in his concession speech: "We fought the best fight that's ever been fought in a very tough district, I think what we have here is a huge movement. So what we did is built a foundation, and we'll be back."
