= Independent Greens =

Independent Greens may refer to:

- Independent Greens (Denmark)
- Independent Greens of Virginia
- Maine Green Independent Party
