= Matthew Berry (politician) =

American lawyer (born 1972)

- Born: September 27, 1972 (age 53)
- Education: Dartmouth College (BA); Yale University (JD)
- Political party: Republican

Matthew B. Berry (born September 27, 1972) is an American Republican Party politician and attorney. He challenged Patrick Murray in the 2010 Republican primary election in Virginia's 8th congressional district, a Congressional seat in Northern Virginia then held by 10-term Democratic incumbent Jim Moran. He was defeated narrowly by Murray in a June 8 primary. He is now serving as the General Counsel to the House of Representatives.

== Early life and education ==
Berry graduated from Dartmouth College in 1994 with a Bachelor of Arts. He then attended Yale Law School, where he was an editor of the Yale Law Journal and the Yale Journal on Regulation. He graduated in 1997 with a Juris Doctor.

== Career ==
After graduating from law school, Berry was a law clerk for Judge Laurence Silberman of the U.S. Court of Appeals for the District of Columbia Circuit and then for U.S. Supreme Court Justice Clarence Thomas. He then joined the United States Department of Justice, where he helped to gain reauthorization of the USA PATRIOT Act, and crafted legislation to follow the recommendations of the 9/11 Commission. During his time at the Justice Department, Berry won the John Marshall award; the department's highest award for legal performance by attorneys.

Following his tenure at the Department of Justice, Berry served as Deputy General Counsel and then General Counsel for the Federal Communications Commission (FCC). As the commission's highest legal officer, Berry was responsible for providing legal advice, and defending the commission's orders in court. He later served as chief of staff to FCC Chairman Ajit Pai.

=== Congressional campaign ===
Berry, who had never run for political office before 2010, raised more campaign funds than any other Republican candidate to run in the 8th district in recent years, with US$124,000 as of May 26, 2010. The Congressional seat that Berry ran for lies directly south of Washington, D.C. and includes all of Arlington County, the city of Alexandria, Virginia and part of Fairfax County. The district has been won by Democratic candidates in the past three presidential elections by margins often exceeding ten points, and Jim Moran, the former mayor of Alexandria, held the district for nearly twenty years prior to retirement.

Berry describes himself as "pro life" and believes "All Americans should be seen as equal under the eyes of the law". He also supports Second Amendment rights. Berry said that he wanted to end Congressional earmarking as well as to eliminate the Troubled Asset Relief Program (TARP). Berry's support of same-sex marriage and of repealing the military's Don't Ask, Don't Tell policy drew some criticism from conservative bloggers in Virginia.

In closing remarks at a debate with Patrick Murray at T.C. Williams High School in Alexandria, Berry said his campaign was better organized to run against Moran and could attract crossover Democrats and independent voters. "I don’t want us to be in a situation again where we’re bringing a knife to a gunfight," he said.

Berry was defeated by Murray narrowly on June 8, 2010. Prior to his defeat Berry had been the subject of mailers and calls sent out by the Murray campaign attacking his stance on gay rights issues.

== Personal life ==
Berry, who is openly gay, lives in Arlington County, Virginia with his partner.

== See also ==
- List of law clerks for the tenth seat of the Supreme Court of the United States
