= Jim Moran =

American politician (born 1945)

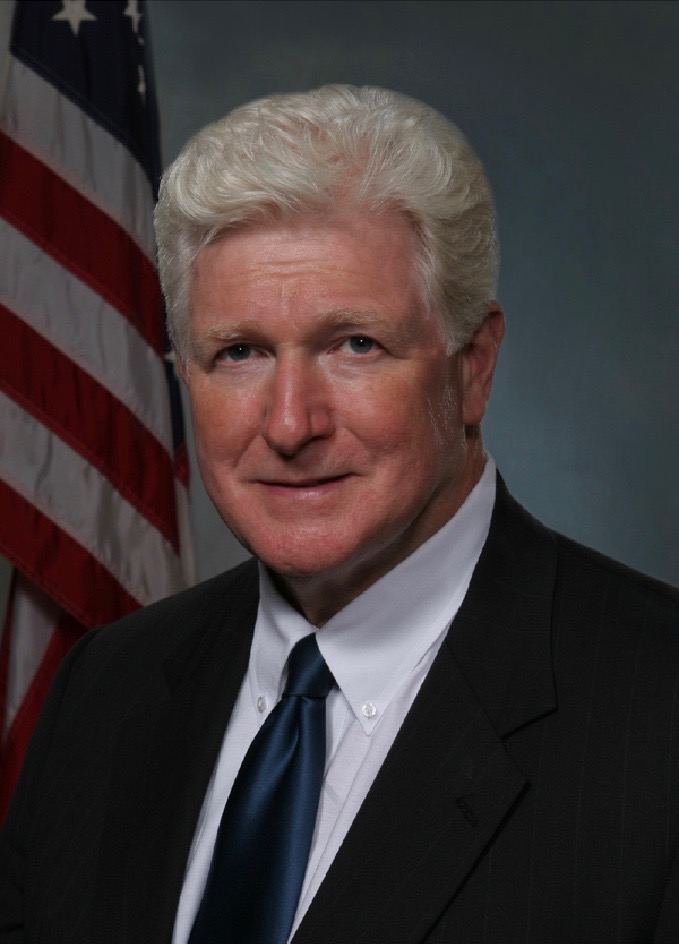

Chair of the New Democrat Coalition
- In office January 3, 1997 – January 3, 2001 Serving with Cal Dooley, Tim Roemer
- Preceded by: Position established
- Succeeded by: Jim Davis; Ron Kind; Adam Smith

Member of the U.S. House of Representatives from Virginia's 8th district
- In office January 3, 1991 – January 3, 2015
- Preceded by: Stanford Parris
- Succeeded by: Don Beyer

Mayor of Alexandria
- In office July 1, 1985 – January 2, 1991
- Preceded by: Chuck Beatley
- Succeeded by: Patsy Ticer

Personal details
- Born: James Patrick Moran Jr. May 16, 1945 (age 81) Buffalo, New York, U.S.
- Party: Democratic
- Spouses: Mary Craig (m. 1967–1976); Mary Howard (m. 1988–2003); LuAnn Bennett (m. 2004–2010); Deborah Warren (m. 2025)
- Children: 4
- Relatives: James Moran Sr. (father); Brian Moran (brother)
- Education: College of the Holy Cross (BA); University of Pittsburgh (MPA)

James Patrick Moran Jr. (born May 16, 1945) is an American politician who served as the U.S. representative for Virginia's 8th congressional district (including the cities of Falls Church and Alexandria, all of Arlington County, and a portion of Fairfax County) from 1991 until 2015. He was previously the mayor of Alexandria, Virginia, from 1985 until 1990.

A member of the Democratic Party, Moran chaired the New Democrat Coalition from 1997 until 2001. He is of Irish descent and is the son of James Moran Sr., a former professional football player, and the brother of Brian Moran, former chairman of the Democratic Party of Virginia.

== Early life and education ==
Moran was born in Buffalo, New York, the eldest of seven siblings in a Roman Catholic family of Irish descent. He grew up in Natick, Massachusetts, a suburb of Boston. His parents were Dorothy (née Dwyer) and James Moran Sr., a professional football player for the Boston Redskins in 1935 and 1936; outside of football he worked as a probation officer. Both his father and mother were Roosevelt Democrats and supporters of the New Deal. Moran attended Marian High School in Framingham, Massachusetts.

Moran graduated from the College of the Holy Cross with a Bachelor of Arts in economics in 1967. As an undergraduate at Holy Cross, he played college football on an athletic scholarship; his father previously been a football star at the college in the early 1930s. He then did graduate studies at Baruch College of the City University of New York from 1967 to 1968 and earned a Master of Public Administration from the University of Pittsburgh in 1970.

== Career ==
After college, Moran followed his father's footstep to become an amateur boxer. During a campaign in 1992, he admitted that he had used marijuana during his early 20s. Following a brief career as a stockbroker, Moran moved to Washington, D.C.

Moran worked for five years at the Department of Health, Education, and Welfare as a budget officer before serving as a senior specialist for budgetary and fiscal policy at the Library of Congress. From 1976 to 1979, he was on the staff of U.S. Senate Committee on Approrpriations.

In 1979, Moran was elected to the City Council of Alexandria, Virginia. From 1982 to 1984, he was deputy mayor. In 1984, he resigned as part of a nolo contendere plea bargain to a misdemeanor conflict of interest charge, which courts later erased. The incident stemmed from charges that Moran had used money from a political action committee to rent a tuxedo and buy Christmas cards; both of which were later judged by the Commonwealth Attorney to "fit the definition of constituent services", and were dismissed.

In 1985, Moran was elected mayor of Alexandria, Virginia. He was reelected in 1988, and resigned after he was elected to Congress in November 1990.

== U.S. House of Representatives ==
=== Elections ===
In 1990, Moran first won election to the United States House of Representatives, defeating five-term Republican incumbent Stan Parris. During the campaign, Parris, referring to the issue of the Gulf War, said, "The only three people I know who support Saddam Hussein's position are Moammar Gadhafi, Yasser Arafat, and Jim Moran." Moran angrily responded by saying that Parris was "a deceitful, fatuous jerk", and that he wanted "to break his nose". Moran's well-financed campaign also focused on Parris' opposition to abortion. Moran upset Parris, winning by 7.1 percent. He was sworn into office in January 1991.

In the next two elections, Moran faced Republican lawyer Kyle McSlarrow. During the 1992 campaign, McSlarrow accused Moran of "lying to the public". Moran responded by portraying McSlarrow as a drug abuser, referring to the candidate's admitted use of cocaine and marijuana while at the University of Virginia. Moran compared McSlarrow to Parris, saying that Parris had "[t]en times more integrity than McSlarrow. He didn't create lies." Moran defeated McSlarrow with 56 percent of the vote. He was helped by the 1990s redistricting, which cut out some of the more Republican-leaning areas of his district.

In 1994, Moran's daughter Dorothy was suffering from an inoperable brain tumor. During the campaign, neither Moran nor McSlarrow used the negative tactics of two years earlier. On his campaign strategy that election, McSlarrow said "It would not be a community service to shut down this campaign, but I probably will not talk much about Moran." Moran was reelected with 59 percent of the vote.

In 1998 and 2000, Moran faced Republican and flat tax advocate Demaris H. Miller. In the 1998 campaign Miller accused Moran of flip-flopping in his support of President Bill Clinton, after Moran, who had been a vocal supporter of the Clinton White House, voted in favor of opening an impeachment inquiry following the Monica Lewinsky scandal.

In 2002, Moran defeated Republican S. C. Tate and Independent R. V. Crickenberger.

In June 2004, Moran, for the first time since his election in 1990, had a Democratic opponent in a primary. Moran defeated Alexandria attorney Andrew M. Rosenberg, 59% to 41%. In November, he defeated Republican Lisa Marie Cheney.

In 2006, Moran defeated Republican challenger T. M. Odonoghue and Independent J. T. Hurysz.

In 2008, Moran again had a primary challenger; he won with 86% of the vote. In the general election, Moran faced Republican Mark Ellmore and Independent Green Ron Fisher. He won with 68 percent of the vote to Elmore's 30 percent. In November 2009, Ellmore announced he would again challenge Moran, but dropped out of the race four months later. In the June 2010 Republican primary, attorney Matthew Berry narrowly lost to retired U.S. Army Colonel Jay Patrick Murray, after a last-minute mailing attacking Berry's homosexuality. Fisher again was on the ballot. During the campaign, Moran was criticized by military advocacy groups and conservatives for saying, at a local Democratic committee meeting, that Murray had not "served or performed any kind of public service". Moran responded by commending Murray's military service, while saying that he used the phrase in relation to Murray not having engaged in "local civic engagement" and not having served in local office. In November 2010, Moran was re-elected to an eleventh term with 61% of the vote.

In 2012, Moran faced another primary challenge, from Navy veteran Bruce Shuttleworth. A controversy erupted when the Democratic Party of Virginia disqualified Shuttleworth, saying he had fallen 17 signatures short of the 1,000 threshold required. Shuttleworth cried foul and filed a federal lawsuit; the party then allowed Shuttleworth on the ballot. Moran went on to win by a sizable margin. In November, Moran defeated Republican J. Patrick Murray, Independent Jason J. Howell, and Independent Green Janet Murphy, winning 64% of the vote.

=== Tenure ===
Moran represented Virginia's 8th congressional district, an area in Northern Virginia that is just across the Potomac River from Washington, D.C.; the district includes Arlington county, and the cities of Alexandria, Falls Church and parts of Fairfax County. The redistricting that followed the 2000 census also gave Moran a portion of Reston, Virginia. His district is located in the Dulles Technology Corridor and is the home of many federal defense contractors as well as a significant number of those who work in the information technology industry. Many federal employees also reside within the district, mostly due to its proximity to Washington and because the United States Department of Defense and various other agencies are headquartered there.

During the mid-1990s, Moran co-founded and later co-chaired the New Democrat Coalition, a coalition of Democratic lawmakers who consider themselves to be moderates with regard to commerce, budgeting, and economic legislation, but vote as liberals on social issues. Moran was also a member of the Congressional Progressive Caucus (CPC), the largest caucus operating within the Democratic caucus, which works to advance progressive issues and opinions. He joined the caucus prior to the 111th Congress.

==== 1990s ====
In 1995, Moran and California Republican Duke Cunningham had to be restrained by the Capitol Police after a shoving match on the house floor over President Bill Clinton's decision to send U.S. troops to Bosnia. "I thought he had been bullying too many people for too long, and I told him so ... He said he didn't mean to be so accusatory ... After that, he would bring me candy from California", Moran claimed.

During the final years of the Clinton administration, Moran was critical of the President. In 1998, during the Monica Lewinsky scandal, Moran was one of only 31 House Democrats to support launching a formal impeachment inquiry into Bill Clinton. In August 1998, he told Time magazine that, "This whole sordid mess is just too tawdry and tedious and embarrassing ... It's like a novel that just became too full of juicy parts and bizarre, sleazy characters." Moran is also reported to have told First Lady Hillary Clinton that if she had been his sister, he would have punched her husband in the nose. Moran eventually decided not to vote for impeachment, explaining that Clinton had not compromised the country's security, and that he still respected him for what he had accomplished as president. Moran proposed a resolution demanding that Clinton confess to a pattern of "dishonest and illegal conduct" surrounding his sexual involvement with Monica Lewinsky.

==== 21st century ====
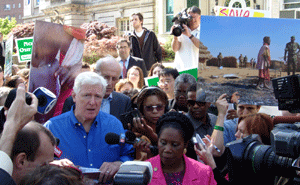
Moran and Sheila Jackson Lee protesting outside the Embassy of Sudan in Washington, D.C., in April 2006

Moran was voted High Technology Legislator of the Year by the Information Technology Industry Council and was voted into the American Electronics Association Hall of Fame for his work on avoiding the Year 2000 crisis and his support of the IT Industry and defense contractors in Northern Virginia. He cosponsored failed bills in 2005 to provide the District of Columbia with a House seat and to prohibit slaughter of horses.

On April 28, 2006, Moran, along with four other members of Congress (the now-deceased Rep. Tom Lantos of California, Sheila Jackson Lee of Texas, and James McGovern and John Olver of Massachusetts), and six other activists, were arrested for disorderly conduct in front of the Sudanese embassy in Washington, D.C., and spent 45 minutes in a jail cell before being released. They were protesting the alleged role of Sudan's government in ethnic cleansing in Darfur. According to the San Francisco Chronicle, "Their protest and civil disobedience was designed to embarrass the military dictatorship's ongoing genocide of its non-Arab citizens."

The day after the Virginia Tech massacre in 2007, Moran told a local radio station that the Federal Assault Weapons Ban should be reinstated, blaming the National Rifle Association of America and President George W. Bush for blocking gun control legislation. He further warned that if gun control legislation was not passed, then shootings such as the one at Virginia Tech will happen "time and time again." He later dismissed charges that he was politicizing the shooting, telling Politico that "as a legislator, your immediate reaction is to think something could be done to avoid this. I don't know why the idea of figuring out how to avoid it is a political partisan issue."

Shortly before the June 2008 Virginia Democratic primary, Moran endorsed Senator Barack Obama of Illinois for the presidency over New York Senator and former First Lady Hillary Clinton. Explaining his endorsement, he told a local newspaper that the long-term goal of closing Alexandria's coal-fired power plant would be more attainable under Obama than under Clinton. Obama won the Virginia primary, and carried the state when he won the general election in November.

Moran, accompanied by his wife, LuAnn Bennett, being sworn into a ninth term in the House of Representatives by Speaker Nancy Pelosi in 2007.

In May 2009, Moran introduced a bill that would restrict broadcast advertisements for erectile dysfunction or male enhancement medication. He said that such ads were indecent and should be prohibited on radio and television between the hours of 6 am and 10 pm, in accordance with Federal Communications Commission policy. Later that year, Moran and former presidential candidate and former Governor of Vermont Howard Dean held a town hall meeting on the issue of health care at South Lakes High School in Reston, Virginia. The meeting was interrupted several times by protesters, most notably anti-abortion activist Randall Terry, who, along with about half a dozen supporters, caused such a commotion that he had to be escorted out by police. The incident was replayed several times over the next few weeks on television as an example of the tension at town halls that fall.

In February 2010, on the House floor, Moran called for the repeal of Don't ask, don't tell, the military policy of discharging soldiers on active duty who are openly homosexual. He spoke about a letter penned by a gay soldier who was then serving in the Afghanistan War, who had "learned that a fellow soldier was also gay, only after he was killed by an IED in Iraq. The partner of the deceased soldier wrote the unit to say how much the victim had loved the military; how they were the only family he had ever known ... This immutable human trait, sexual orientation, like the color of one's skin, does not affect one's integrity, their honor, our commitment to their country. Soldiers serving their country in combat should not have their sacrifices compounded by having to struggle with an antiquated "Don't ask, don't tell" policy. Let's do the right and honorable thing and repeal this policy."

As a member of the House Appropriations Committee, Moran worked to allocate federal funding to projects in Northern Virginia, usually in the technology and defense industries. He also assisted in authorizing the replacement of the Woodrow Wilson Memorial Bridge, a bridge between Alexandria, Virginia, and Prince George's County, Maryland, which had gained a reputation over the years among Northern Virginia residents as the site of numerous rush-hour traffic jams.

On March 9, 2010, Moran was named to succeed Norm Dicks of Washington as the chairman of the House Interior and Environment Appropriations Subcommittee. The chairmanship gave Moran authority over appropriations to the Department of the Interior, the Bureau of Indian Affairs, and the National Endowment for the Arts; among other things. Moran said he was excited to be able to play a role in protecting the environment and conserving natural resources.

==== 2010s ====
Moran became the ranking member of the subcommittee after the Democratic Party lost control of the House of Representatives following the November 2010 elections.

After President Obama's 2011 State of the Union Address, Moran was interviewed by Alhurra, an Arab television network. During the interview, he said, "a lot of people in [the United States of America] ... don't want to be governed by an African-American" and that the Democrats lost seats in the 2010 election for "the same reason the Civil War happened in the United States ... the Southern states, particularly the slaveholding states, didn't want to see a president who was opposed to slavery." The remarks received national media attention. The Washington Post's Jennifer Rubin said the remarks were "beyond uncivil" and "obnoxious".

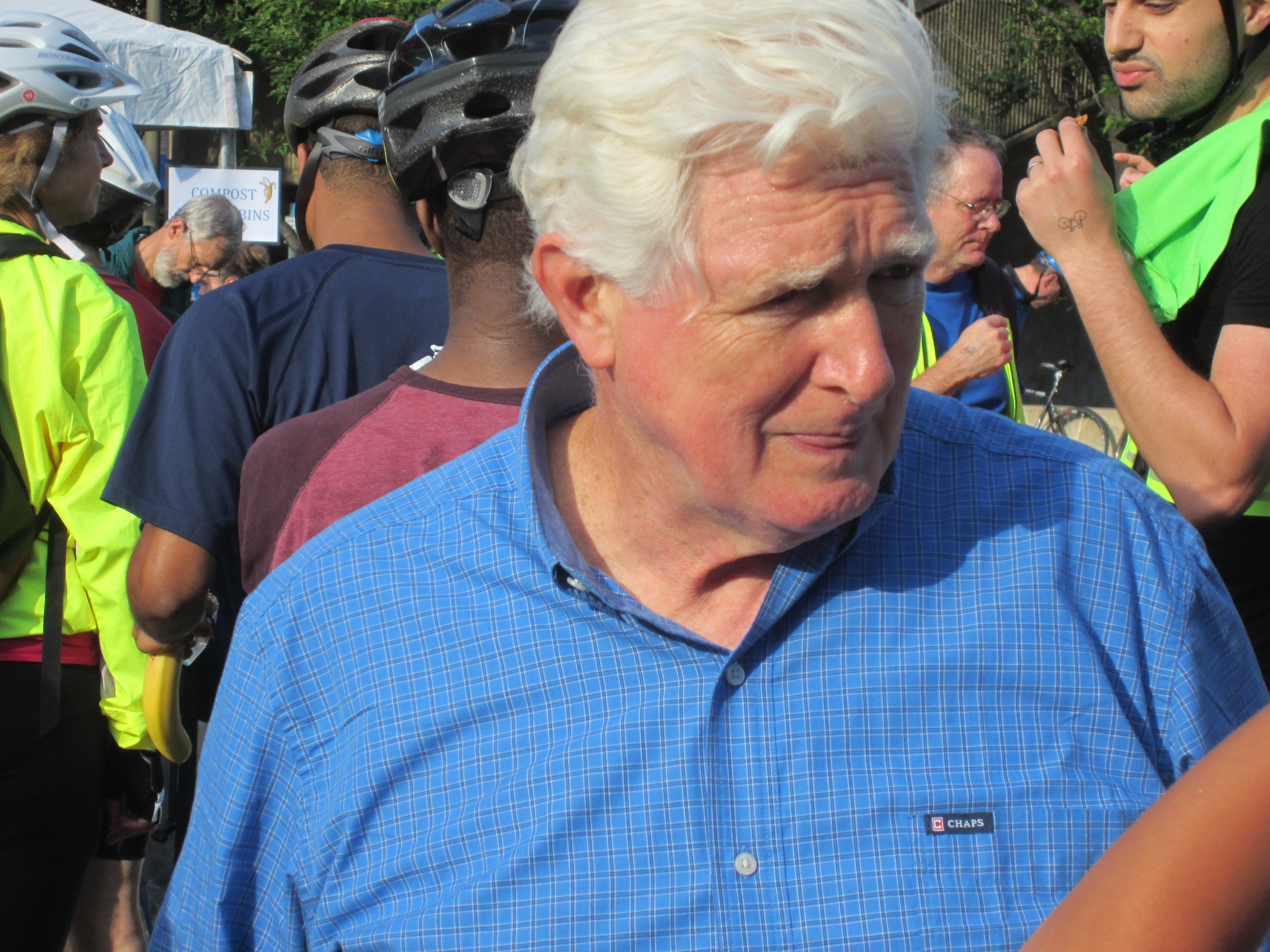
Jim Moran attending the Rosslyn pit stop at Bike-to-Work Day DC 2012

On March 16, 2012, Moran was arrested outside the Sudanese embassy in Washington, DC, at a protest against human rights abuses perpetrated by the Sudanese government, specifically bombings in the Nuba Mountains and refusal to allow humanitarian aid organizations access to refugees. He was charged with disorderly conduct and released, along with George Clooney and several others.

On March 27, 2012, Moran introduced the AUTISM Educators Act that would implement a five-year pilot program allowing public schools to partner with colleges, universities, and non-profit organizations to promote teaching skills for educators working with high functioning students with autism. "This legislation is the product of a grassroots effort by parents, instructors, school officials and caring communities," he said. "Autism Spectrum Disorders are being diagnosed at an exploding rate. We have a responsibility to do everything in our power to provide the best education for our children."

In 2012, the bipartisan grassroots organization No Labels recognized Moran as a "Problem Solver" for "continued willingness to work across the aisle and find common ground with members of the opposite party on important issues. His attitude is what Congress needs more of."

Moran joined Virginia Reps. Gerry Connolly and Bobby Scott in asking Attorney General Eric Holder for a Department of Justice investigation into allegations of voter fraud in Virginia following charges that a contractor to the Republican Party of Virginia was caught discarding completed voter registration forms in a Harrisonburg, Virginia dumpster. Shortly thereafter, conservative activist James O'Keefe released a video alleging involvement by Moran's son in a voting fraud discussion; see #Voter fraud allegations below.

Moran occasionally appeared on MSNBC, usually on Hardball with Chris Matthews and The Ed Show.

He did not seek re-nomination to Congress in 2014, retiring after 24 years. Virginia's former lieutenant governor, Don Beyer, a fellow Democrat, was elected to succeed Moran.

=== Committee assignments ===
- Committee on Appropriations
  - Subcommittee on Defense
  - Subcommittee on Interior, Environment, and Related Agencies (Ranking Member)

=== Caucus memberships ===
- Congressional Progressive Caucus
- New Democrat Coalition (co-founder)
- Animal Protection Caucus (co-chair)
- Sudan Caucus
- Sportsmen's Caucus
- International Conservation Caucus
- Congressional Arts Caucus
- Congressional Bike Caucus
- Safe Climate Caucus
- Crohn's and Colitis Caucus (co-chair)

== Political positions ==
=== Social issues ===
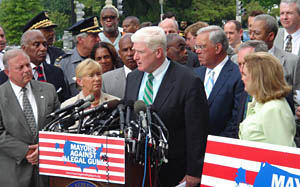
Moran speaking at an event for Mayors Against Illegal Guns, March 2010

Moran voted against the Defense of Marriage Act, the Federal Marriage Amendment, and was in favor of repealing the military's Don't Ask, Don't Tell policy. He also supported gun control, voting for the Brady Bill and supporting a reinstatement of the Federal Assault Weapons Ban. At different times he voted to ban flag-burning and partial-birth abortions, though he reversed his positions on both issues. On education, he expressed support for the public education system, universal pre-kindergarten, and full funding for the No Child Left Behind program. Moran was given a 100% rating by the NARAL and 0% by the National Right to Life Committee, indicating a pro-abortion rights voting record. He also voted to expand research of embryonic stem cells and to allow minors to go across state lines to receive abortions.

On immigration, Moran supported a pathway to citizenship for illegal immigrants and did not support decreasing the number of legal immigrants allowed into the country or the enforcement of federal immigration laws by state and local police. He was a cosponsor of the Comprehensive Immigration Reform ASAP Act of 2009 (H.R.4321), which the House did not pass. He was given an overall immigration reduction grade of D by NumbersUSA. The American Immigration Lawyers Association scored him as having voted 31 times for the organization's position and 7 times against the organization's position.

In September 2009, Moran was one of 75 members of the House of Representatives to vote no on a bill to eliminate any federal funds going to community organizer ACORN.

=== Federal employees ===
Moran introduced and supported legislation to increase benefits and pay for federal workers, in part due to the Federal Government's large presence within the 8th District – 114,000 federal employees work within its bounds. He introduced a bill signed into law that allows FERS employees to buy back credit from a lapse in federal service toward annuity payments, with the goal of attracting individuals from the private sector back to public service. Moran also authored a law that allows a federal worker's unused sick leave to count toward their annuity. In the 112th Congress, he also spoke against attempts by Republicans to cut back the size of the federal workforce.

=== Environment ===
Moran listed the environment as one of his top issues, citing his high marks from the League of Conservation Voters and the Sierra Club. He used his positions as a member of the Appropriations Committee and as chairman of the Interior Appropriations Subcommittee to allocate federal funding for hiking trails and wildlife reserves in his district.

He also voted to ban logging on federal lands. He criticized the United States Environmental Protection Agency (EPA) for inaction on climate change, saying that "EPA had a historic opportunity to tackle head-on one of the greatest threats to our existence—global warming. Instead they balked under pressure from the administration, concluding the problem is so complex and controversial that it cannot be resolved." He also endorsed and voted for the Clean Air Act and said that global warming is an important issue to him. In 2010, Moran also expressed discontent with President Barack Obama's decision to allow oil drilling off the coast of the United States.

=== Economy, budget, and taxes ===
Moran often broke with his party on economic issues. For example, he supported Dominican Republic-Central America Free Trade Agreement (CAFTA) and other free trade agreements, harsher bankruptcy laws, and increased restrictions on the right to bring class action suits.

He voted for the American Recovery and Reinvestment Act of 2009 and the Troubled Asset Relief Program (TARP) Reform and Accountability Act. He supported pay-as-you-go budgeting and believed "that the American government needs to strive to build up a surplus when possible, so that there are funds to support and sustain our country during tough financial times." Moran called former President George W. Bush "Fiscally irresponsible."

Moran said he supported the redistribution of wealth, saying in November 2008 that "We have been guided by a Republican administration who believes in this simplistic notion that people who have wealth are entitled to keep it and they have an antipathy towards the means of redistributing wealth." He also said on his website that the recession was largely "a result of the imbalance in the distribution of wealth over the last eight years and an absence of oversight and accountability."

=== Social programs ===
Moran called Social Security "a safe, stable, and dependable source of financial assistance for retirees and their families," and strongly opposes privatizing Social Security, saying that it would "cripple the system". It was his position that any changes to the current system must "promote its long-term solvency without disrupting the core principles on which the program was founded."

Moran expressed support for Universal Healthcare and more specifically the public health insurance option, saying at a town hall meeting in Reston, Virginia, in August 2009 that "It could do the most to bring down long-term medical costs and to adequately insure every American." Moran ultimately voted for the Patient Protection and Affordable Care Act, which passed and was signed into law in March 2010.

=== Defense ===
Moran voted against authorizing the Iraq War in 2002 and did not support the troop increase for the Afghanistan War proposed by President Barack Obama in 2009, saying first that he appreciated Obama's "careful consideration regarding the U.S.'s engagement in Afghanistan", but later defining the issues on which he and the President disagreed:

Our security concern is Al-Qaeda, not the Taliban. Eight years ago we went into Afghanistan to eliminate al-Qaeda and the "safe haven" that Afghanistan's Taliban were providing the terrorist group responsible for the 9/11 attacks. Al-Qaeda has no significant presence today in all of Afghanistan. ... Instead of increasing our troop presence, the U.S. should limit its mission in Afghanistan to securing strategic Afghan population centers with the troops currently on the ground.

==== Comments prior to the invasion of Iraq ====
Prior to the 2003 invasion of Iraq, Moran told an anti-war audience in Reston, Virginia, that if

If it were not for the strong support of the Jewish community for this war with Iraq, we would not be doing this. The leaders of the Jewish community are influential enough that they could change the direction of where this is going, and I think they should.

This brought criticism from many of his own party, including, among others, Senate Democratic Leader Tom Daschle and Senator Joe Lieberman. Nancy Pelosi, who was House Minority Leader at the time, remarked that "Moran's comments have no place in the Democratic Party."

Moran apologized for the remarks, saying that

I should not have singled out the Jewish community and regret giving any impression that its members are somehow responsible for the course of action being pursued by the administration, or are somehow behind an impending war ... What I was trying to say is that if more organizations in this country, including religious groups, were more outspoken against war, then I do not think we would be pursuing war as an option.

=== BRAC ===
Moran voted against BRAC 2005 which would move over 20,000 workers to Ft. Belvoir. The Army later decided to relocate approximately 6,400 Department of Defense workers to the Mark Center building in Alexandria. Moran opposed the selection of the Mark Center saying "I'm very disappointed ... It belonged at the Springfield site." Moran blocked federal funding for an HOV ramp directly to the Mark Center citing the impact upon Winkler Preserve.

At Moran's request, DoD ultimately delayed moving all workers to the Mark Center by one year. To help prevent gridlock, Moran got $20 million in short- and mid-term road improvements and a parking limit at the Mark Center of approximately 2,000 cars Moran also got $180 million to widen route 1 for the new Ft. Belvoir Hospital, an effort Sen. Webb called "a tribute to Congressman Moran's persistence."

=== Animal rights ===
Moran was in favor of stronger prohibitions against animal fighting. He sponsored legislation to penalize those who "knowingly attend animal fights and allow minors to attend." He sponsored legislation limiting federal funding for horse slaughter inspection plants, effectively preventing the practice. In the past he promoted reinstating a five-year ban on slaughtering horses for food, noting that "horses hold an important place in our nation's history and culture ... they deserve to be cared for, not killed for foreign consumption." Moran in the past promoted safer keeping and treatment of exotic animals used in circus performances. In October 2014, Moran received the Lord Houghton Award from Cruelty Free International for his service and contribution to animal welfare.

=== Other ===
Moran does not support granting statehood to the District of Columbia. However, he voted to allow Washington, D.C., to send a voting representative to the United States Congress.

== Controversies ==
=== MBNA loan ===
Moran's support for harsher bankruptcy law provisions and sponsorship of stricter bankruptcy legislation brought allegations in 2002 that his support came in return for financial favors by financial institutions which could benefit from such laws. In January 1998, one month before he introduced the legislation, credit card bank MBNA advocated that it would restrict the ability of consumer debtors to declare bankruptcy. Moran received a $447,000 debt consolidation loan at over 10% interest rate.

The Lieutenant Governor of Virginia at the time, Tim Kaine, joined Republican lawmakers in calling for a House Ethics Committee investigation into the loan, saying that Moran had made "an error in judgment" by accepting it. In his own defense, Moran said that the timing of the legislation's introduction was coincidental and had nothing to do with the loan. MBNA spokesman Brian Dalphon said that the bank had offered the mortgage package not knowing that Moran was a member of Congress, and that the loan "made good business sense" because with the mortgage loan, "we improved our position by getting security for an unsecured loan. ... He had credit cards with us, he was having financial difficulties; this put him in a better position to be able to pay us back from a cash-flow standpoint."

=== PMA group ===
The House Ethics Committee investigated several members of the House Defense Appropriations Subcommittee, including Moran, Peter J. Visclosky, Norm Dicks, Marcy Kaptur and the late John Murtha, who was the chairman at the time, for a conflict of interest in the allocation of the government contracts to clients of the PMA Group, which donated nearly a million dollars to Moran's political action committee, as well as a significant amount of money to the gubernatorial campaign of Moran's younger brother, Brian. Moran said that he was unaware of "who made donations", and "how much they gave", and therefore was not affected by the donations when allocating the funding.

In February 2010, the panel cleared Moran and the others, saying that they violated no laws. The panel concluded, as part of its 305-page report, that "simply because a member sponsors an earmark for an entity that also happens to be a campaign contributor ... does not support a claim that a member's actions are being influenced by campaign contributions". After PMA's founder, Paul Magliocchetti, pleaded guilty in September 2010 to six years of campaign finance fraud, Moran said that he would not return the $177,700 in PMA Group-related donations that he received from 1990 to 2010.

=== Insider trading ===
In November 2011, author Peter Schweizer published a book, Throw Them All Out, which included an allegation that Moran used information he got from a September 16, 2008, briefing, in which Treasury Secretary Henry Paulson and Federal Reserve Chairman Ben Bernanke warned of what became the 2008 financial crisis, for his stock market activity:

September 17, 2008, was by far Moran's most active trading day of the year. He dumped shares in Goldman Sachs, General Dynamics, Franklin Resources, Flowserve Corporation, Ecolabs, Edison International, Electronic Arts, DirecTV, Conoco, Procter & Gamble, AT&T, Apple, CVS, Cisco, Chubb, and a dozen more companies.

Schweizer alleged that Moran made more than 90 trades that day. Moran defended himself by citing that the trades were made in the midst of the Great Recession and that all one had to do was turn on the television to see that stock prices were dropping fast.

=== Voter fraud allegations ===
On October 24, 2012, a video was released showing Patrick B. Moran, the Congressman's son and a field director with his father's campaign, discussing a plan to cast fraudulent ballots. It was proposed to him by someone who posed as a fervent supporter of the campaign. In response to the person's suggestion about trying to cast votes using the names of 100 inactive voters, Patrick Moran attempted to discourage the scheme, but also discussed the practical difficulties of forging documentation such as utility bills. The person he was speaking with was actually a conservative activist with James O'Keefe's Project Veritas, and was secretly recording the conversation. Patrick Moran resigned from the campaign, saying he didn't want to be a distraction during the election, and stating, "at no point have I, or will I ever endorse any sort of illegal or unethical behavior. At no point did I take this person seriously. He struck me as being unstable and joking, and for only that reason did I humor him. In hindsight, I should have immediately walked away, making it clear that there is no place in the electoral process for even the suggestion of illegal behavior, joking or not."

The following day, the Arlington County Police Department opened a criminal probe into the matter. Two days after the video was released, the Virginia State Board of Elections asked Attorney General of Virginia Ken Cuccinelli to investigate Moran's campaign for voter fraud. On January 31, 2013, Arlington County announced that the investigation, by its police department in collaboration with the Offices of the Virginia Attorney General and the Arlington County Commonwealth's Attorney, had concluded and that no charges would be brought. The County stated: "Patrick Moran and the Jim Moran for Congress campaign provided full cooperation throughout the investigation. Despite repeated attempts to involve the party responsible for producing the video, they failed to provide any assistance."

=== Anti-Semitism and the Iraq War ===
In 2003, Moran drew criticism for telling an audience in Reston, Virginia that "if it were not for the strong support of the Jewish community for this war with Iraq, we would not be doing this." The comment was condemned by then House Democratic leader Nancy Pelosi and then Democratic Senate Minority Leader Tom Daschle. In 2007, Moran again generated controversy for linking the Jewish community with the war, this time by blaming AIPAC for American involvement in Iraq, telling the progressive Jewish magazine Tikkun that "… AIPAC is the most powerful lobby and has pushed this war from the beginning … because they are so well organized, and their members are extraordinarily powerful – most of them are quite wealthy – they have been able to exert power." The comments were again condemned by Democratic leadership as anti-semitic.

== Later career ==
In February 2015, Moran joined McDermott Will & Emery as a senior legislative advisor. He later left the firm and became a senior policy advisor in the Washington, D.C. office of Nelson Mullins Riley & Scarborough. In April 2023, he started his own lobbying firm, Moran Global Strategies, representing clients such as Qatar, Biafran separatist Simon Ekpa and various defense contractors.

Virginia Tech announced in April 2016 that Moran had joined the School of Public and International Affairs as professor of practice.

== Electoral history ==
Virginia's 8th congressional district: Results 1990–2012
Year	Subject	Party	Votes	%	Opponent	Party	Votes	%	Opponent	Party	Votes	%
1990	James Moran	Democratic	88,745	51.7	Stanford Parris	Republican	76,367	44.6	Robert T. Murphy	Independent	5,958	3.5
1992	James Moran	Democratic	138,542	56.1	Kyle E. McSlarrow	Republican	102,717	41.6	Alvin O. West	Independent	5,601	2.3
1994	James Moran	Democratic	120,281	59.3	Kyle E. McSlarrow	Republican	79,568	39.3	R. Ward Edmonds	Independent	1,858	0.9
1996	James Moran	Democratic	152,334	66.4	John E. Otey	Republican	64,562	28.1	R. Ward Edmonds	Independent	6,243	2.7
1998	James Moran	Democratic	97,545	66.6	Demaris H. Miller	Republican	48,352	33.0				
2000	James Moran	Democratic	164,178	63.3	Demaris H. Miller	Republican	88,262	34.0	Ron Crickenberger	Independent	3,483	1.3
2002	James Moran	Democratic	102,759	59.8	Scott Tate	Republican	64,121	37.3	Ron Crickenberger	Independent	4,558	2.6
2004	James Moran	Democratic	171,986	59.7	Lisa Cheney	Republican	106,231	36.9	James Hurysz	Independent	9,004	3.1
2006	James Moran	Democratic	144,700	66.4	Tom O'Donoghue	Republican	66,639	30.6	James Hurysz	Independent	6,094	2.8
2008	James Moran	Democratic	222,986	67.9	Mark Ellmore	Republican	97,425	29.7	J. Ron Fisher	Independent Green	6,829	2.1
2010	James Moran	Democratic	116,293	61.0	Jay Patrick Murray	Republican	71,108	37.3	J. Ron Fisher	Independent Green	2,704	1.4
2012	James Moran	Democratic	226,847	64.6	Jay Patrick Murray	Republican	107,370	30.6	Jason J. Howell	Independent	10,180	2.9

== Personal life ==
Moran has been married four times and divorced three times. His second wife, Mary Howard Moran, filed for divorce in 1999, one day after an argument at the couple's Alexandria home that resulted in a visit from the police. The Congressman provided his own divorce papers a few months later, and in 2003 the couple officially separated. He remarried in 2004 to real estate developer LuAnn Bennett. In December 2010, Moran and Bennett announced they were separating. Moran married a fourth time in 2025 on his 80th birthday to Deborah Warren.

Moran is the father of four children. A son, Patrick B. Moran, once worked as a field director for one of Moran's election campaigns but resigned in 2012 when allegations of voter fraud surfaced. Later in 2012, Patrick pleaded guilty to simple assault after being arrested after an incident with his girlfriend in front of a Columbia Heights bar on December 1. He was sentenced to probation.

Another one of Moran's children is Dorothy, who was diagnosed with an inoperable brain tumor during her father's campaign for reelection against Kyle McSlarrow in 1994. It was said at the time that she had only a twenty percent chance of living to age five, but after almost two years of chemotherapy and herbal therapies she was declared cancer-free.

His brother, Brian Moran, is a former member of the Virginia House of Delegates, and the head of the Virginia Democratic Party between early 2011 and December 2012. He was an unsuccessful primary candidate for Governor of Virginia in the 2009 election.

Political offices
Preceded by Chuck Beatley	Mayor of Alexandria; 1985–1990	Succeeded by Patsy Ticer
U.S. House of Representatives
Preceded by Stanford Parris	Member of the U.S. House of Representatives from Virginia's 8th congressional district 1991–2015	Succeeded by Don Beyer
Party political offices
New office	Chair of the New Democrat Coalition; 1997–2001; Served alongside: Cal Dooley, Tim Roemer	Succeeded by Jim Davis; Ron Kind; Adam Smith
U.S. order of precedence (ceremonial)
Preceded by Nancy Johnson as Former U.S. Representative	Order of precedence of the United States as Former U.S. Representative	Succeeded by Billy Tauzin as Former U.S. Representative
