= Kyle E. McSlarrow =

American lawyer and political candidate (born 1960)

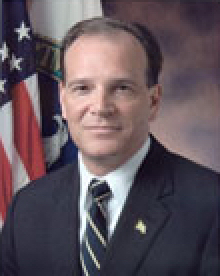

United States Deputy Secretary of Energy
- In office November 27, 2002 – February 2005
- President: George W. Bush
- Preceded by: Frank Blake
- Succeeded by: Clay Sell

Personal details
- Born: Kyle Eugene McSlarrow; June 29, 1960 (age 66)
- Party: Republican
- Spouse: Alison
- Education: Cornell University (BA); University of Virginia (JD)

Military service
- Allegiance: United States
- Branch/service: United States Army
- Rank: Captain

Kyle Eugene McSlarrow (born June 29, 1960) is a former Deputy Secretary of the United States Department of Energy and Congressional candidate. From 2011 to 2017, he served as the head of Comcast's lobbying and government-affairs office, which included NBCUniversal lawyers and lobbyists. In 2017, he became Comcast's Senior Vice President, Customer Experience Operations.

== Background ==
McSlarrow, a native of Virginia, earned degrees from Cornell University and the University of Virginia School of Law. He and his wife, Alison, live in Falls Church, Virginia.

Before moving to Capitol Hill in 1995, McSlarrow was an associate with the Washington, D.C. law firm of Hunton & Williams. As a captain in the U.S. Army, McSlarrow served in the Secretary of the Army's office as Assistant to the General Counsel of the Army from 1985 to 1989.

== Political campaigns ==
Before joining the Department of Energy, McSlarrow served as Vice President of Political and Government Affairs for Grassroots.com, a privately held Internet company which marketed web-based political tools and services. McSlarrow has held numerous positions in the political arena. From 1998 to 2000, he was the national chairman of the Dan Quayle for president campaign. In 1997, he joined the office of the late U.S. Senator Paul Coverdell as Chief of Staff. McSlarrow also served as Deputy Chief of Staff and Chief Counsel for Senate Majority Leaders Bob Dole and Trent Lott between 1995 and 1997. McSlarrow was the Republican nominee in Virginia's 8th Congressional District in 1992 and 1994, losing both times to incumbent Jim Moran.

Year	Subject	Party	Votes	%	Opponent	Party	Votes	%	Opponent	Party	Votes	%
1992	Kyle McSlarrow	Republican	102,717	41.6	Jim Moran	Democratic	138,542	56.1	Alvin O. West	Independent	5,601	2.3
1994	Kyle McSlarrow	Republican	79,568	39.3	Jim Moran	Democratic	120,281	59.3	R. Ward Edmonds	Independent	1,858	0.9

== US Department of Energy ==
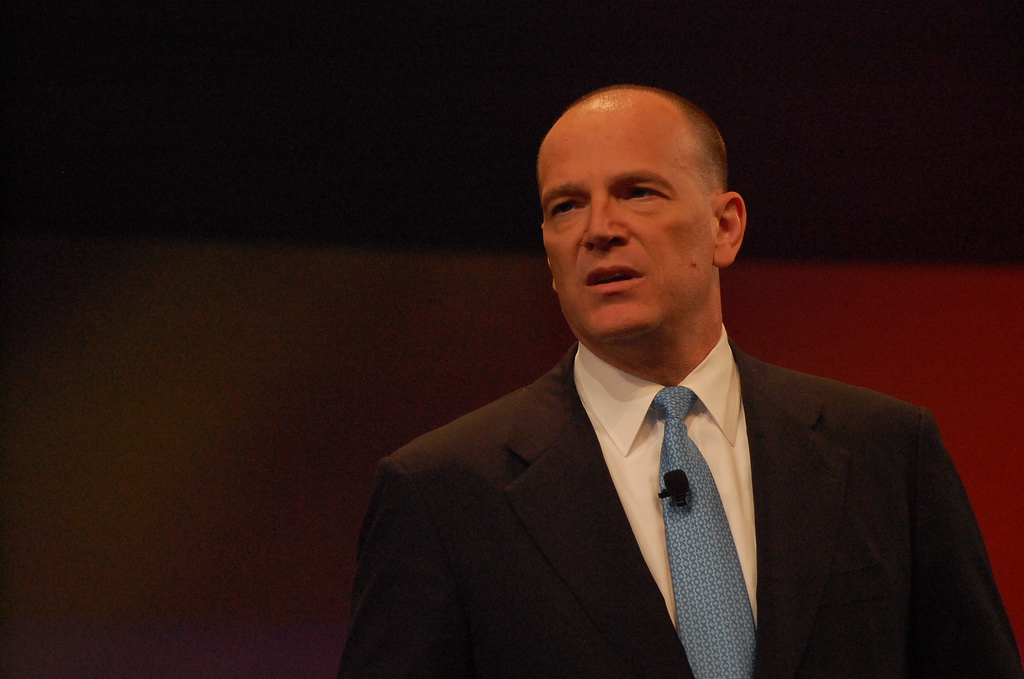
McSlarrow speaking in 2008

McSlarrow became Chief of Staff of the Department of Energy, serving during the George W. Bush administration.

On November 27, 2002, McSlarrow was appointed United States Deputy Secretary of Energy. He also was co-chairman of the U.S.-Russia Energy Working Group, a program started by George W. Bush and Russian President Vladimir Putin. He resigned in January 2005, leaving in early February.

== Cable lobbyist ==
McSlarrow was president & CEO of the National Cable & Telecommunications Association, a trade group representing the U.S. cable industry, from March 2005 to 2011. In 2010, he earned $2.8 million. According to Politico, this salary made him the best-paid tech lobbyist in the nation. He departed the role in 2011 and was succeeded by Michael K. Powell.

== Comcast ==
McSlarrow headed Comcast's lobbying and government-affairs office from April 2011 to 2017. In 2017, he became the company's Senior Vice President, Customer Experience Operations. He retired in 2023.
