= List of significant United States town hall meetings =

Town hall meetings in the United States are a common way for local and national politicians to meet with their constituents, either to hear from them on topics of interest or to discuss specific upcoming legislation or regulation. Town halls are often a low-key way for national politicians to connect or reconnect with their constituents during recesses, when they are in their home districts away from D.C. However, during periods of active political debate, they can be a locus for protest and more active debate.

== 2009 ==
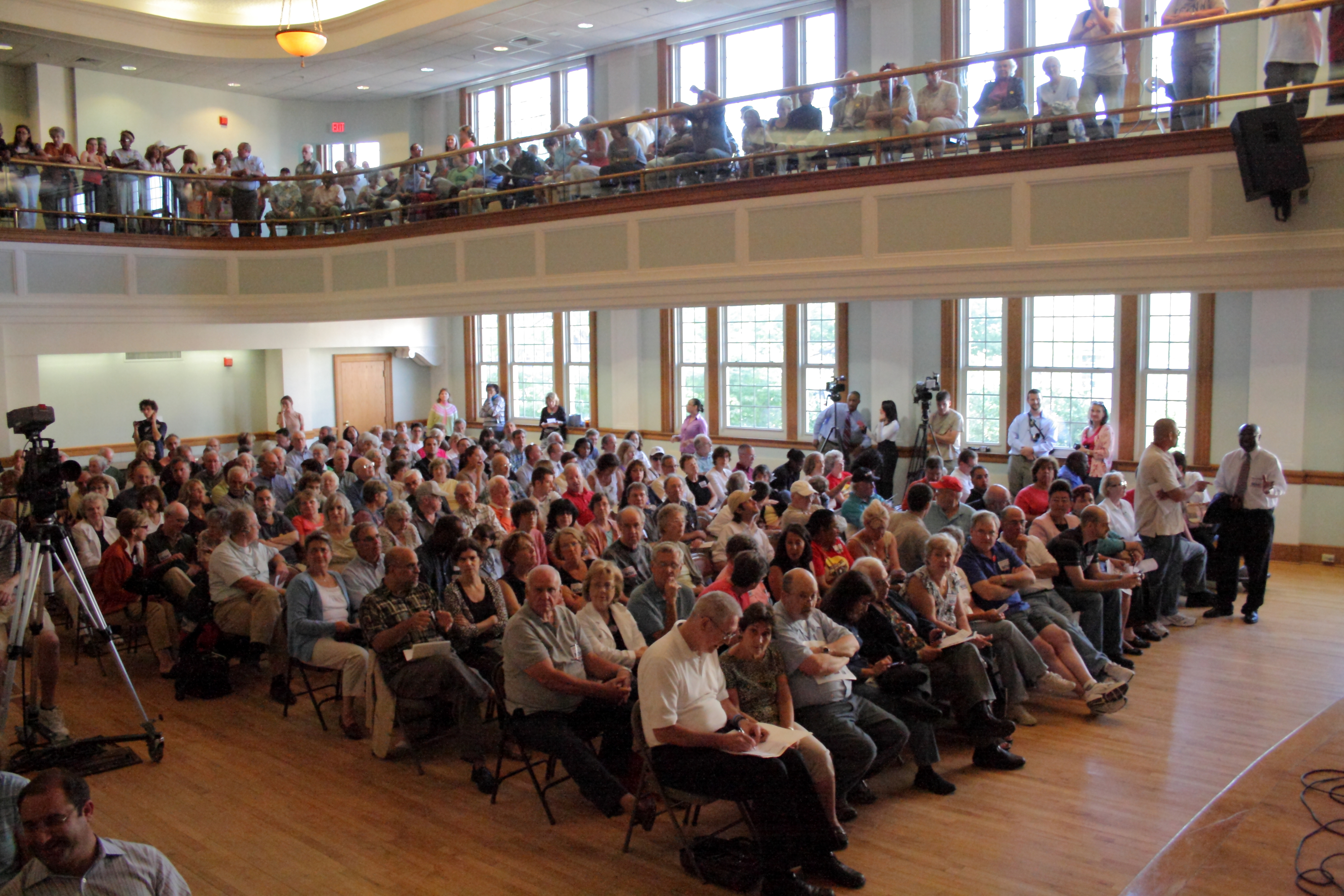
Attendees of a town hall meeting on the subject of health care reform in West Hartford, Connecticut, waiting for the meeting with U.S. Representative John B. Larson, in 2009

A number of town hall meetings in the summer of 2009 focused on healthcare and the introduction of new laws regarding health insurance. Many of these meetings were dominated by protests and angry crowds opposed to the new legislation. They were motivated by a mix of political opposition and fear that changes would harm them or their families.

== 2011 ==
Barack Obama held a widely discussed Twitter Town Hall. Hundreds of thousands of accounts tweeted at the event, but only a small number got official responses.

== 2017 ==
The promise of repealing and possibly replacing the Affordable Care Act led to an increased number of town hall meetings in the winter of 2017, shortly after Donald Trump took office. These mirrored the energetic interest in town halls in the summer of 2009. These meetings were again dominated by protests and fear that changes to healthcare policy would harm constituents or their families. In many communities, these were the first large town hall meetings held in over four years.
