= Independent Greens of Virginia =

Independence Party of America affiliate

Independent-Green Party of Virginia
- Chairperson: Carey Chet Campbell
- Founded: 2003; 23 years ago
- Ideology: Green conservatism Fiscal conservatism
- Political position: Center-right
- National affiliation: Independent-Green Party US (2022–present)
- Colors: Green
- Seats in the Senate of Virginia: 0 / 40
- Seats in the Virginia House of Delegates: 0 / 100

The Independent Greens of Virginia (also known as the Indy Greens) was the state affiliate of the Independence Party of America in the Commonwealth of Virginia. It became a state party around 2003 when a faction of the Arlington local chapter of the Green Party of Virginia (GPVA) split from the main party. As of 2011, it bills itself as a "fiscally conservative, socially responsible green party", with an emphasis on rail transportation and "more candidates". In support of wider ballot participation, it endorses many independent candidates who are not affiliated with the party.

The party, separate from the national Green Party of the United States, affiliated itself with the Independence Party of America on January 10, 2008.

Without "major party" status for automatic ballot access in Virginia, the party has had to gather petition signatures to get on the ballot. The requirement for statewide elections is 10,000 signatures, including at least 400 from each of Virginia's 11 congressional districts. In order for the party to gain automatic ballot access as a major party, one of its nominated candidates must receive 10% of the vote in a statewide race.

== Philosophy and positions ==
The platform of the Independent Greens focuses on fiscal conservatism, calling for balanced budgets at local, state, and federal levels, and paying off the national debt. The party supports term limits as well as transportation issues. It is perhaps best known for its advocacy of "More Trains, Less Traffic" building high-speed rail nationwide, new rail subways in every major American city, and light rail. On July 7, 2008, the Indy Greens endorsed the Pickens Plan, a proposal by financier T. Boone Pickens, to build wind and solar power and cut dependence on foreign oil.

== Electoral history ==
=== 2005 ===
In July 2005, the party filed paperwork with the Virginia State Board of Elections claiming 15 candidates as their nominees. According to the Lynchburg News & Advance, only six were in fact candidates of the party; the other nine were independents or candidates of other third parties. Those nine disavowed the Independent Green designation to the State Board of Elections.

=== 2006 U.S. Senate race ===
The Indy Greens' most prominent candidate in the 2006 election was retired Air Force officer Glenda Gail Parker who ran for the United States Senate against Republican George Allen, the incumbent, and ex-Navy Secretary Jim Webb, the Democratic Party challenger. Parker considered withdrawing her candidacy late in the race if one of the other candidates would commit to funding new passenger rail systems and a new accounting system at the Pentagon, and agree to balancing the federal budget and paying off the federal debt. Ultimately, she neither withdrew nor made any official endorsements, but she did offer some last-minute support to Webb. Parker garnered 26,102 votes (1.1%). The margin between Webb and Allen was 9,329 votes, less than Parker's vote.

Comedian Stephen Colbert found her "Gail for Rail" campaign jingle worthy of a post-election sing-along on his television show The Colbert Report. Colbert also joked that Parker, whose real first name is Glenda, purposely changed her name to Gail just so it would rhyme with "light rail" to make the campaign jingle flow.

=== 2007 Virginia elections ===
The Independent Greens nominated candidates for five state legislative seats. In four of those races, the Democratic incumbent had no other opposition, and the Indy Green nominee received between 17% and 21% of the vote.

- Senate 31 (Arlington, Fairfax, Falls Church): Samuel D. Burley, 4,676 votes (16.52%)
- Senate 35 (Fairfax, Alexandria): Mario T. Palmiotto, 4,532 vote (20.95%)
- House 39 (Fairfax): Laura C. Clifton, 2,847 votes (21.17%)
- House 49 (Arlington, Fairfax, Alexandria): James Ronald Fisher, 1,072 votes (19.12%)

In the other race, both the Democratic and Republican parties nominated a candidate.

- House 28 (Stafford, Fredericksburg): Craig E. Ennis, 457 votes (3.23%)

=== 2008 U.S. presidential race ===
On January 1, 2008, the Independent Greens became the first state political party in America to launch a petition drive to put New York City Mayor Michael Bloomberg on the ballot for President of the United States. On April 14, 2008, the party delivered 10,000 petition signatures to the Virginia State Board of Elections to put Michael Bloomberg on the ballot for president, with U.S. Representative Ron Paul as his running mate. On February 28, 2008, Bloomberg stated, "I am not — and will not be — a candidate for president," and added that he is "hopeful that the current campaigns can rise to the challenge by offering truly independent leadership. The most productive role that I can serve is to push them forward, by using the means at my disposal to promote a real and honest debate."

By August 1, 2008, the Indy Greens had submitted over 18,000 petition signatures to the state board of elections to put the stand-in Bloomberg/Paul ticket on the ballot in Virginia. On August 15, 2008, the Virginia State Board of Elections confirmed that they had collected enough signatures to put Bloomberg and Paul on the ballot. Bloomberg withdrew from the Indy Greens ballot line on September 5, 2008. Indy Greens then offered the nomination to Texas oilman T. Boone Pickens to run in promotion of his plan to reduce the United States' foreign oil intake by investing in alternative energy.

After Bloomberg and Pickens declined the Party's unsolicited 2008 nomination for president, and Paul declined the vice-presidential spot, the Constitution Party ticket of Chuck Baldwin and Darrell Castle were offered the party's ballot line and accepted it on September 8 of that year. Baldwin and Castle received 7,474 votes (0.2%) in Virginia.

=== 2009 Virginia elections ===
The party did not nominate candidates for statewide office in the 2009 state elections but had attempted to draft Washington Capitals hockey team owner Ted Leonsis as the gubernatorial candidate. It did field candidates in seven of the 100 House of Delegates districts, the most of any third party. The top vote-getter was Craig Ennis in the 28th district, who received 24.5% of the vote against Republican Speaker of the House Bill Howell, who had no Democratic opponent.

In January 2009 the right-wing Constitution Party of Virginia gave the Independent Green Ballot Access Committee $25,000.

=== 2016 Presidential election ===
The party's nominated candidate for president was Dr. Jill Stein, who was also nominated by the Green Party of Virginia.

=== U.S. congressional candidates ===
==== 2006 ====
The party nominated candidates in three Congressional districts: in the 4th, Albert Burckard received 23.4% against Republican incumbent Randy Forbes; in the 5th, Joseph Oddo received 0.9% against incumbent Republican Virgil Goode and Democratic challenger Al Weed, and in the 11th, Fernando Greco received 0.9% against incumbent Republican Tom Davis and Democratic challenger Andrew Hurst.

==== 2008 ====
Glenda Gail Parker ran for the U.S. Senate for a second time in 2008. Incumbent Republican Senator John Warner chose to retire, and the seat was picked up by Democrat Mark Warner over Republican Jim Gilmore, by 65% to 34%. Parker came in third, with 21,690 votes (0.59%), just above Libertarian Bill Redpath, with 20,269 votes (0.55%).

Two Indy Greens were nominated for the House of Representatives. In the 8th District, J. Ron Fisher received 2.08% against incumbent Democrat Jim Moran (68%) and Republican challenger Mark Ellmore (30%). In the 11th District seat of retiring incumbent, Joseph Oddo received 2.02% against Democrat Gerry Connolly (55%) and Republican Keith Fimian (43%).

==== 2010 ====
In the 2010 United States House of Representatives elections in Virginia, the Independent Greens nominated candidates in four Congressional districts.

The following candidates ran as Independent Greens:

- 1st District: G. Gail "for Rail" Parker, retired U.S. Air Force officer. Received 1.2% of the vote.
- 7th District: Floyd C. Bayne, businessman Received 6.5% of the vote.
- 8th District: J. Ron Fisher, retired U.S. Navy Captain. Received 1.4% of the vote.
- 11th District: David William Gillis, Jr., realtor. Received 0.4% of the vote.

==== 2012 ====
The following candidates ran as Independent Greens:

- 1st District: G. Gail Parker. She received 8,308 votes (2.31%)
- 5th District: Kenneth Hildebrandt. Hildebrandt received 5,500 votes for 1.58%
- 8th District: Janet Murphy. Murphy received 5,985 votes (1.7%)
- 11th District: Peter Marchetti. He received 1,919 votes for 0.58%.

==== 2014 ====
The following candidates ran as Independent Greens:

- 1st District: G. Gail Parker. She received 5,097 votes (2.4%)
- 5th District: Kenneth Hildebrandt. He received 2,209 votes (1.1%)
- 6th District: Elaine B. Hildebrandt. She received 21,447 votes (11.9%)
- 8th District: Gerard C. Blais, III. He received 963 votes (0.5%)
- 10th District: Dianne Blais. She received 946 votes (0.4%)
