= Town hall meeting =

Reception where local and national politicians meet with their constituents

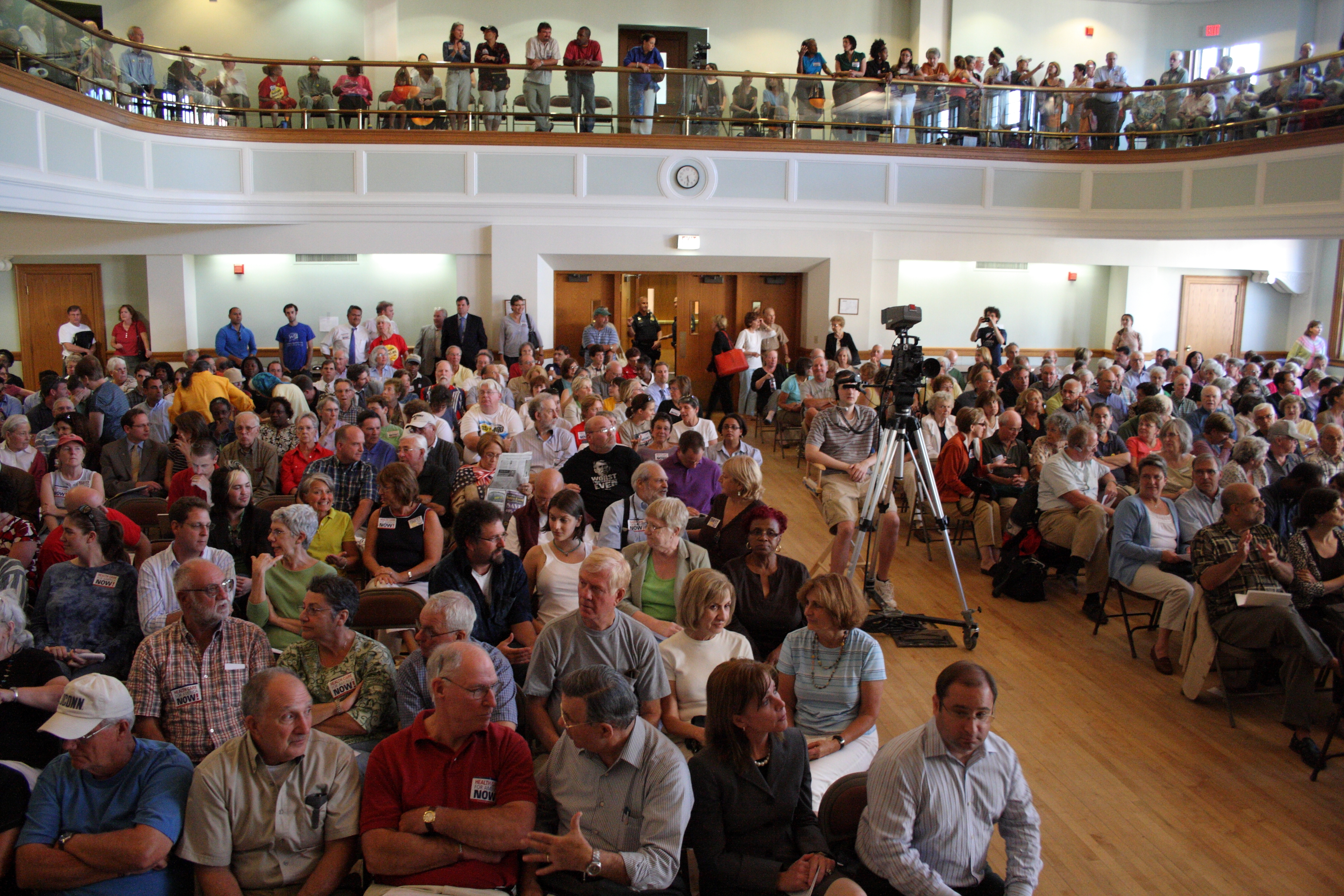
A town hall meeting in West Hartford, Connecticut

Town hall meetings, also referred to as town halls or town hall forums, are a way for local and national politicians to meet with their constituents either to hear from them on topics of interest or to discuss specific upcoming legislation or regulation. During periods of active political debate, town halls can be a locus for protest and more active debate. The term originates mainly from North America, and is unfamiliar in British English where politicians instead hold surgeries.

Despite their name, town hall meetings do not necessarily take place in a town hall. They are commonly held in a range of venues, including schools, libraries, municipal buildings, and churches. A number of officials have also experimented with digital formats for town halls. Town hall meetings organized by national politicians are often held in a variety of locations distributed across a voting district so that elected representatives can receive feedback from a larger proportion of constituents.

Historically, no specific rules or guidelines have defined a town hall meeting. Any event that allows constituent participation with a politician may be called a town hall, including gatherings in person, group phone calls, or events on Internet platforms such as Facebook or Twitter. Attendees use town halls to voice their opinions and question elected officials, political candidates, and public figures. In contrast to town meetings, a type of direct democratic rule that originated in colonial New England, attendees do not vote on issues during town hall meetings.

In the United States, town halls are a common way for national politicians to connect or reconnect with their constituents during recesses, when they are in their home districts away from Washington, D.C.

== History ==
Town hall meetings can be traced back to the colonial era of the United States and to the 19th century in Australia. The introduction of television and other new media technologies in the 20th century led to a fresh flourishing of town hall meetings in the United States as well as experimentation with different formats in the United States and other countries, both of which continue to the present day.

=== United States ===
Town hall meetings are meant to resemble the New England town meeting that originated in the 17th century. However, participants in town hall meetings do not actually vote or make legally binding decisions as town meeting voters do. In March 1795 Wilmington, Charleston, Baltimore, Philadelphia, New-York, and other towns had public meetings related to the Jay Treaty which was leaked to the early press by sitting senators.

Some political organizations track publicized town hall events by politicians across the United States.

The 1858 debates between Abraham Lincoln and Stephen Douglas in some respects resembled a modern town hall meeting, although the candidates did not take questions from the audience. Not until the twentieth century did presidential candidates commonly campaign in person. Gradually, especially from the 1990s onward, presidential town hall meetings have become nearly as common as stump speeches.

Richard Nixon's 1968 U.S. presidential campaign staged nine live televised question and answer sessions using a ground-breaking theatre-in-the-round format broadcast with a live studio television audience and local residents directly asking questions of the candidate. The producer of Nixon's "Man in the Arena" live town-hall programs was Roger Ailes, who would later become CEO of Fox News when that channel launched. Ailes's use of a direct voter-to-candidate question-and-answer format served as the blueprint for subsequent and now ubiquitous town hall candidate formats and even multiple-candidate debates.

Another step in the development of the modern town hall meeting came on March 16, 1977, when President Carter attended a televised town hall meeting in Clinton, Massachusetts, that was "modeled after" a real town meeting but did not include binding votes. Bill Clinton made town hall meetings a part of his presidential campaign.

Interest in town halls fluctuates depending on the level of public interest in the topics being discussed. Controversial or confusing issues that are prominently discussed in the news have led to more town halls being held. Since the 2000s, town halls held by political candidates have announced and enforced rules on crowd behavior and the scope of questions that may be asked.

According to a 2024 study, members of the US Congress held over 25,000 town halls over the period 2015–2022.

=== 21st century ===
In 2009, Tea Party groups opposed to the proposed health care reform legislation began attending town halls to express their disagreement with the legislation. The large and vocal crowds led some representatives to cancel or scale back their town hall events. Representative Brian Baird canceled his live town hall meetings after receiving death threats, choosing to hold a telephone conference call with his constituents instead.

Town hall meetings by teleconference or online grew in popularity. Obama held some as sitting president, starting in 2011. Federal agencies have held town halls on Twitter since at least 2013. Some politicians have held AMAs on Reddit, which have similar formats.

In 2017, constituents opposed to repeal of that same health care act began attending town halls to express their disagreement with abolishing the legislation. In 2025, the chairman of the National Republican Congressional Committee encouraged representatives to move their town hall meetings online after a number were flooded by constituents opposed to the Trump administration's policies. In districts where elected representatives have not scheduled town halls, some constituents have publicly petitioned for meetings. Creative requests for town hall meetings include humorous flyer and sticker campaigns as well as songs. Some constituents have held mock town halls, using a cardboard cutout or empty chair, to stand in for elected representatives who decline to meet with them.

=== Australia ===
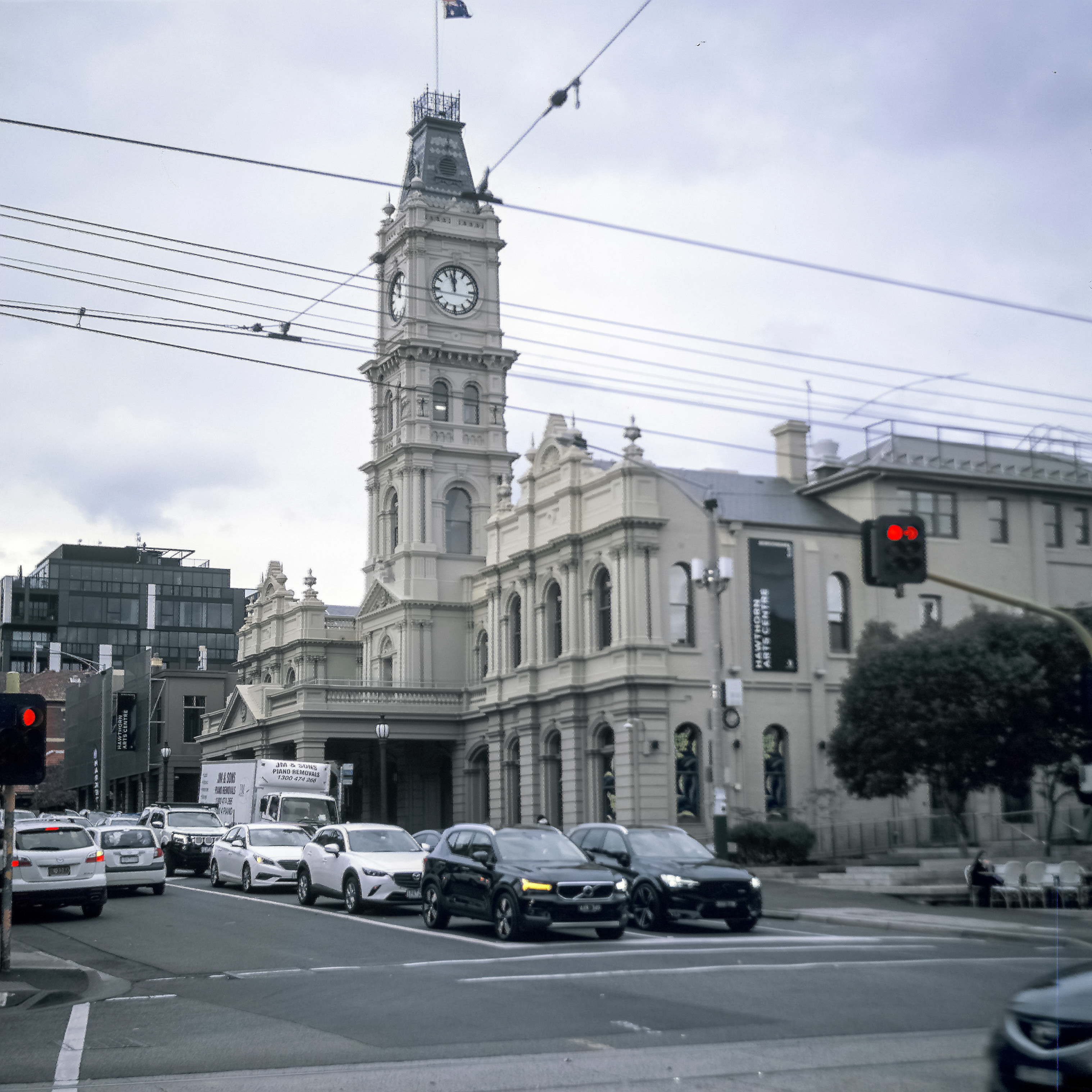
Town hall at Hawthorn in Victoria, Australia

Australian town hall meetings have been held by state politicians since at least the 19th century.

=== Canada ===
Canadian town halls have been forums for provincial politicians to discuss issues of the day since at least the 20th century. During the 1993 federal elections, televised town hall meetings were one of a number of initiatives mainstream media adopted to center ordinary citizens at the heart of their campaign coverage. These efforts, which also included panels of voters to offer comment in print and on radio shows, have been collectively praised as an "international best practice."

== Format ==
The purpose of town hall meetings is for local and regional officials to hear the community's views on public issues.

There have been no specific rules or guidelines for holding a town hall meeting. The format of the meetings can vary. Usually, the person holding the meeting (e.g. member of Congress) makes some opening remarks. Sometimes others (e.g. local leaders) will address the audience, as well. The main part of a town hall meeting tends to occur when the floor is opened up to questions and comments from the audience. Attendees generally present ideas, voice their opinions, ask questions of the public figures, elected officials, or political candidates at the town hall. Sometimes, the town hall meeting is televised or recorded. In recent years, town halls held by political candidates have announced and enforced rules on crowd behavior and the scope of questions that may be asked.

If the turnout is large, and if the objective of the particular town hall meeting is to give as many people as possible an opportunity to speak, then the attendees can be broken down into smaller discussion groups. Each smaller group, in that case, appoints someone to summarize discussion of their group.

Some have explored alternative formats for town hall meetings, such as an "electronic town hall." The Congress Foundation commissioned a report on online town hall meetings, which found they grew in size and importance starting in the mid-2000s.

=== Venues ===
Despite the name town hall, meetings need not take place in a town hall. They commonly take place in a range of venues, including: schools, libraries, municipal buildings, churches, etc. Generally they are held in a public space and there is no charge to attend. In a given district, town hall meetings that are organized by the district's congressional representative are often held in a variety of places across the district.

== Other uses of the term ==
The term "town hall meeting" is also used to describe informal corporate gatherings held to share information such as business results or personnel changes.

== See also ==
- Town meeting
- AmericaSpeaks
- Political surgery
- List of significant United States town hall meetings
- Open cabildo
