= Jay Patrick Murray =

American politician & commentator

Personal details
- Born: Oklahoma City, Oklahoma
- Party: Republican
- Education: Oklahoma State University; Ohio State University

Military service
- Allegiance: United States
- Branch/service: United States Army
- Rank: Colonel
- Battles/wars: Cold War; Iraq War

Jay Patrick Murray is an American political-military commentator and author who is a former Army officer and congressional candidate. Murray was nominated by President Donald Trump to become Alternate Representative of the United States of America for Special Political Affairs in the United Nations, but his nomination was returned by the United States Senate.

== Education ==
Murray is a graduate of Oklahoma State University, where he earned a bachelor's degree in economics and a master's degree in history. He received a master's in Russian studies from Ohio State University. He speaks Russian.

== Career ==
Running as a Republican, Murray unsuccessfully challenged incumbent Democratic Representative Jim Moran in Virginia's 8th congressional district in both 2010 and 2012.

Murray retired from the United States Army with the rank of colonel after 24 years of active duty. He commanded tank units in Europe during the Cold War and was deployed to Baghdad in 2007 during the Iraq War. He served as an adviser in the Bureau of Political Military Affairs at the United States Department of State.

=== Nomination to United Nations post ===
In May 2017, Murray was nominated by President Donald Trump to become the alternate representative for special political affairs to the United Nations. The nomination was approved by the Senate Foreign Relations Committee before being returned to the President in January 2018.

In December 2017, CNN drew attention to Murray's inflammatory posts on social media and his praise for alt-right commentator Milo Yiannopoulos. Murray called former President Barack Obama a "manchild" and shared an image of Obama shaking hands with Al Sharpton which was overlaid an image of a riot with buildings burning. Murray wrote "Barack set out to 'fundamentally transform the United States of America.' And did he ever. How's that working for you?" Murray also defended rancher Cliven Bundy who was awaiting trial for his involvement in the 2014 Bundy standoff, and suggested that being a Democrat was a "mental illness".

== Bibliography ==
- Government is the Problem (2015)
