= 2017 Virginia gubernatorial election =

- November 7, 2017
- Turnout: 47.6% ▲4.6
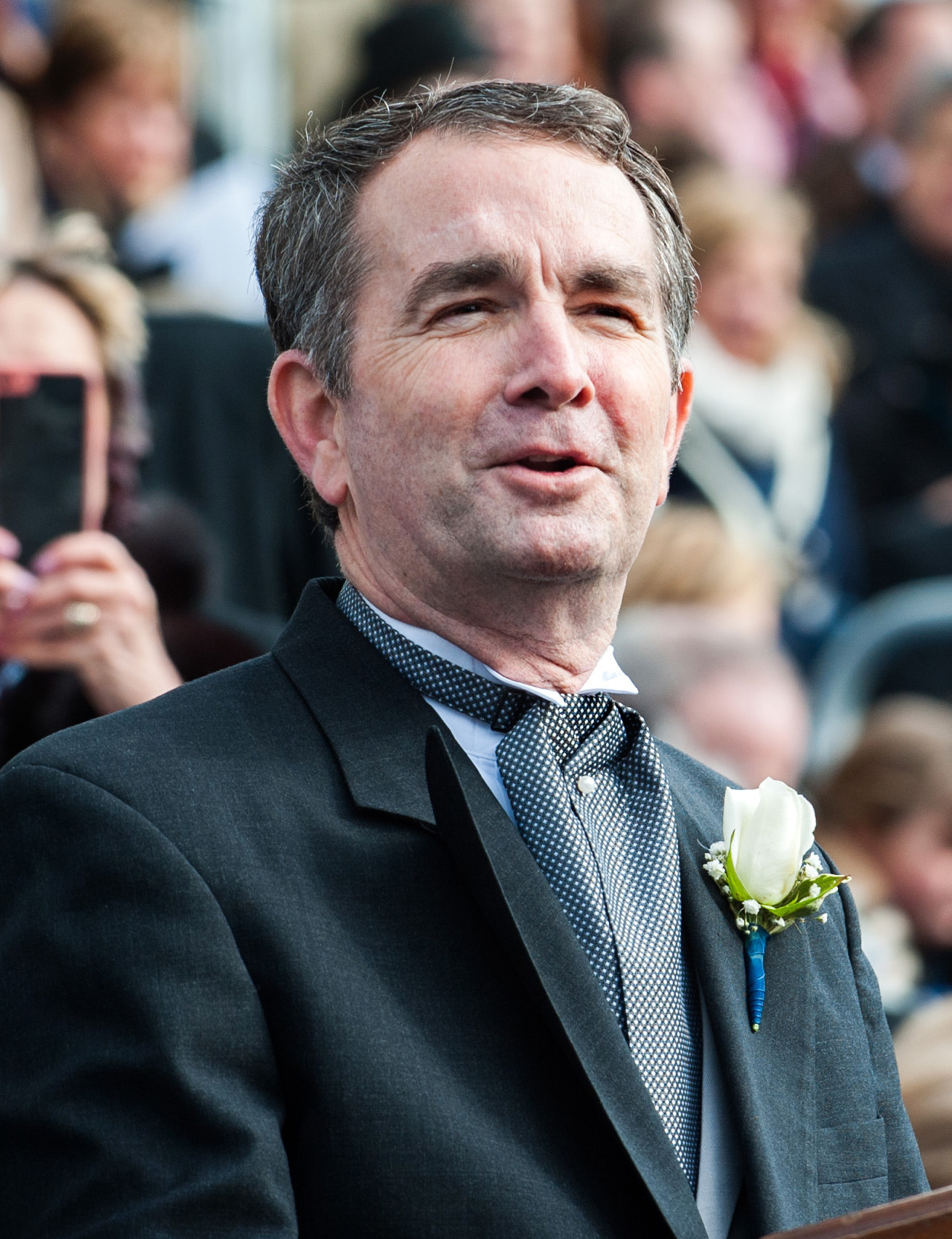

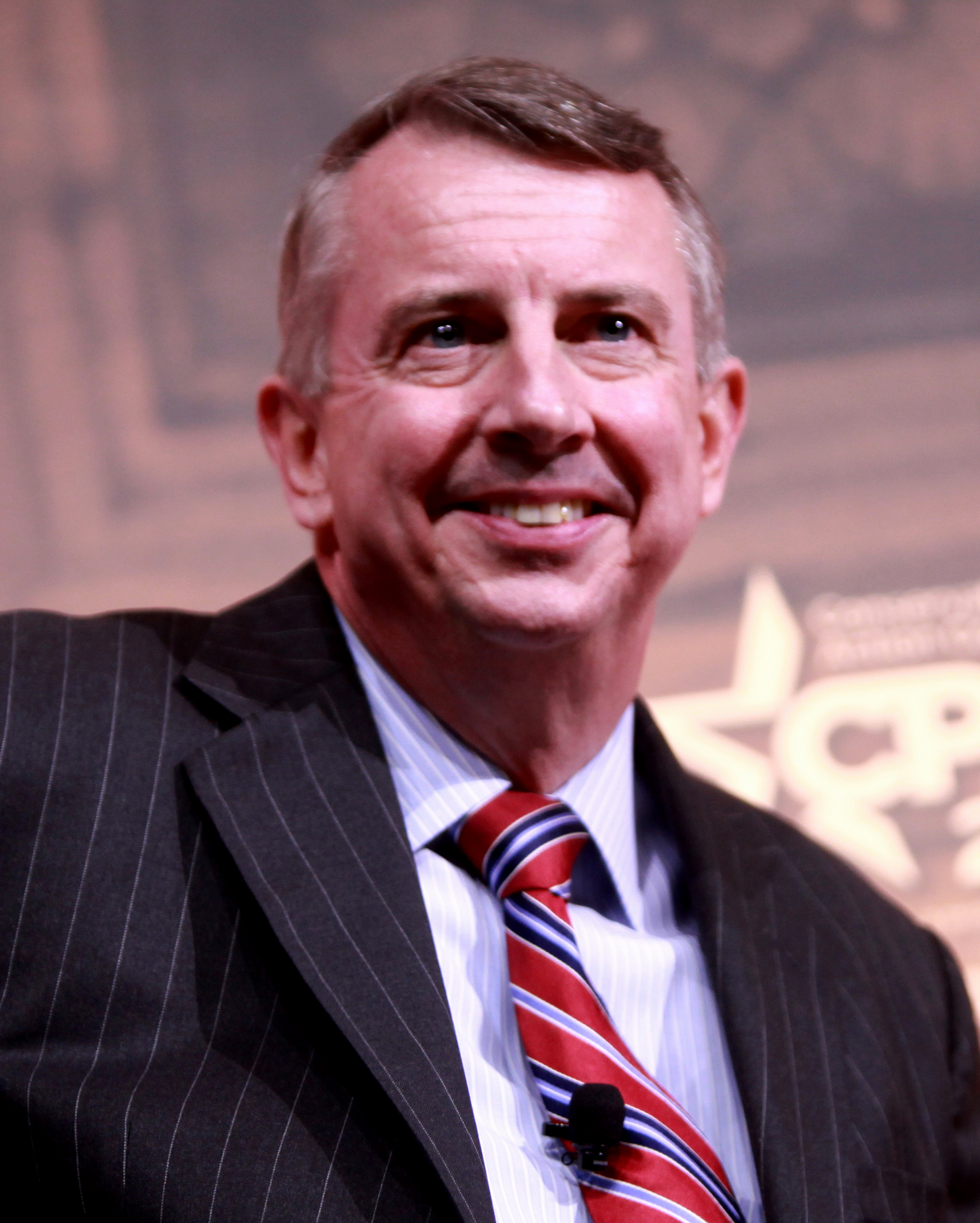
Nominee	Ralph Northam	Ed Gillespie
Party	Democratic	Republican
Popular vote	1,408,818	1,175,732
Percentage	53.89%	44.98%
- Northam: 40–50% 50–60% 60–70% 70–80% 80–90% >90; Gillespie: 40–50% 50–60% 60–70% 70–80% 80–90% >90% Tie: 40–50% No votes
Governor before election
Terry McAuliffe
Democratic
Elected Governor
Ralph Northam
Democratic

The 2017 Virginia gubernatorial election was held on November 7, 2017, to elect the next governor of Virginia. The election was held concurrently with other elections for Virginia's statewide offices, the House of Delegates, and other United States' offices. Incumbent Democratic governor Terry McAuliffe was ineligible to run for re-election, as the Constitution of Virginia prohibits its governors from serving consecutive terms. McAuliffe later unsuccessfully ran for a second non-consecutive term in the 2021 Virginia gubernatorial election.

Primary elections took place on June 13, 2017. Virginia utilizes an open primary, in which registered voters are allowed to vote in either party's primary election. Democrats nominated incumbent lieutenant governor Ralph Northam and Republicans nominated former RNC Chair Ed Gillespie. The Libertarian Party nominated Clifford Hyra by convention on May 6, 2017.

In the general election on November 7, 2017, Democrat Ralph Northam defeated Republican Ed Gillespie by 8.92% points — the largest gubernatorial margin for Democrats since 1985, though this record would be broken 8 years later when Abigail Spanberger won by 15.36% points in 2025.

The election had the highest voter turnout percentage in the state's gubernatorial history since 1997 with 47.6% of registered voters casting their ballot. At the time, both Northam and Gillespie set records for most votes received by a Virginia gubernatorial candidate though both records would be broken in 2021. Chesterfield County voted Democratic for the first time since 1961. Northam assumed office as the 73rd governor of Virginia on January 13, 2018.

== Democratic primary ==
=== Candidates ===
==== Nominee ====
- Ralph Northam, lieutenant governor of Virginia

==== Eliminated in primary ====
- Tom Perriello, former U.S. representative

==== Declined ====
- Gerry Connolly, U.S. representative
- Mark Herring, attorney general of Virginia (running for re-election)
- Brian Moran, Virginia secretary of public safety, former state delegate and candidate for governor in 2009

=== Endorsements ===
Tom Perriello

Federal elected officials

- Rosa DeLauro, U.S. representative from Connecticut
- Russ Feingold, former U.S. senator from Wisconsin
- Bernie Sanders, U.S. senator from Vermont
- Elizabeth Warren, U.S. senator from Massachusetts

Local elected officials

- Ryan Sawyers, chairman of the Prince William County School Board; candidate for Virginia's 1st congressional district in 2018

Individuals

- LuAnn Bennett, Democratic candidate for Virginia's 10th congressional district in the 2016 election
- John W. Boyd Jr., president of the National Black Farmers Association
- Jon Carson, former White House director of the Office of Public Engagement for U.S. president Barack Obama
- Nancy-Ann DeParle, former White House deputy chief of staff to U.S. president Barack Obama
- Patrick Gaspard, former U.S. ambassador to South Africa and former White House director of political affairs to U.S. president Barack Obama
- Teddy Goff, former Obama campaign digital director
- Larry Grisolano, former Obama campaign director of Paid Media
- Hannah Hart, internet personality
- Valerie Jarrett, former senior advisor to the president and former director of White House Office of Public Engagement and Intergovernmental Affairs for U.S. president Barack Obama
- Khizr and Ghazala Khan, gold star family
- Jon Lovett, former speechwriter for Hillary Clinton and President Barack Obama; co-host of progressive political podcast Pod Save America
- Dave Matthews, musician
- Bill McKibben, environmental activist and founder of 350.org
- Cecilia Muñoz, former White House director of the Domestic Policy Council for U.S. president Barack Obama
- Jennifer Palmieri, former White House director of communications for U.S. president Barack Obama
- Daniel Pfeiffer, former senior advisor to U.S. president Barack Obama for strategy and communications; co-host of progressive political podcast Pod Save America
- David Plouffe, President Barack Obama's 2008 campaign manager
- John Podesta, columnist and former chairman of 2016 Hillary Clinton presidential campaign
- Christina Reynolds, former White House director of media affairs for U.S. president Barack Obama
- Amy Rosenbaum, former White House director of legislative affairs for U.S. president Barack Obama
- Mark Ruffalo, actor
- Julianna Smoot, former White House social secretary to U.S. president Barack Obama
- Neera Tanden, domestic policy adviser and the president of the Center for American Progress
- Tina Tchen, former chief of staff for First Lady of the United States Michelle Obama

Organizations

- Climate Hawks Vote, a super-PAC that supports candidates who set climate change as a top priority on their agenda
- Friends of the Earth, an international network of environmental organizations in 74 countries
- Our Revolution, a progressive political action group spun off of the Bernie Sanders presidential campaign, 2016
- People's Action, a progressive group that advocates for the representation of everyone
- Progressive Change Campaign Committee, a PAC which focuses on building progressive power through advocacy campaigns for "big ideas" and campaigning for "bold progressive" candidates

Newspapers

- Bristol Herald Courier
- The Roanoke Times

=== Polling ===
Poll source	Date(s) administered	Sample size	Margin of error	Ralph Northam	Tom Perriello	Other	Undecided
Change Research	June 8–10, 2017	919	± 3.1%	46%	54%	—	—
Hampton University	June 1–6, 2017	750	± 4.2%	21%	29%	—	50%
HaystaqDNA (D-Perriello)	June 1–6, 2017	455	—	36%	37%	—	29%
Garin-Hart-Yang (D-Northam)	May 15–17, 2017	601	± 4.0%	50%	33%	—	17%
Washington Post-Schar School	May 9–14, 2017	351	± 6.0%	38%	40%	—	18%
Public Policy Polling (D)	May 9–10, 2017	745	± 3.6%	45%	35%	—	21%
Public Policy Polling (D)	April 13–14, 2017	586	± 4.1%	42%	28%	—	30%
Quinnipiac University	April 6–10, 2017	483	± 4.5%	20%	25%	1%	51%
Christopher Newport University	March 16–26, 2017	391	± 5.4%	26%	26%	3%	45%
Quinnipiac University	February 10–15, 2017	462	± 4.6%	19%	19%	3%	61%
Christopher Newport University	January 15–28, 2017	464	± 4.8%	15%	26%	1%	58%

Hypothetical polling

Poll source	Date(s) administered	Sample size	Margin of error	Mark Herring	Ralph Northam	Other	Undecided
Public Policy Polling	July 13–15, 2015	409	± 4.9%	33%	9%	—	58%

=== Results ===
Results by county and independent city: Northam: Northam—>90%; Northam—80–90%; Northam—70–80%; Northam—60–70%; Northam—50–60%; Tie: Tie; Perriello: Perriello—50–60%; Perriello—60–70%; Perriello—70–80%; Perriello—80–90%; Perriello—>90%

Democratic primary results
Party	Candidate	Votes	%
Democratic	Ralph Northam	303,846	55.9%
Democratic	Tom Perriello	239,505	44.1%
Total votes		543,351	100.00%

== Republican primary ==
=== Candidates ===
==== Nominee ====
- Ed Gillespie, former chairman of the Republican National Committee; nominee for the U.S. Senate in 2014

==== Eliminated in primary ====
- Corey Stewart, chairman of the Prince William Board of County Supervisors and candidate for lieutenant governor in 2013
- Frank Wagner, state senator

==== Failed to qualify ====
- Emmanuel Peter, bishop

==== Withdrew ====
- Denver Riggleman, businessman
- Rob Wittman, U.S. representative

==== Declined ====
- Bill Bolling, former lieutenant governor of Virginia
- Eric Cantor, former majority leader of the United States House of Representatives
- Ken Cuccinelli, former attorney general of Virginia; nominee for governor in 2013
- Randy Forbes, former U.S. representative
- Tom Garrett Jr., U.S. representative
- Shak Hill, financial consultant and candidate for the U.S. Senate in 2014
- Jeff McWaters, former state senator
- Mark Obenshain, state senator; nominee for attorney general in 2013
- Pete Snyder, technology executive and candidate for lieutenant governor in 2013

=== Endorsements ===
Corey Stewart

National figures

- Bay Buchanan, former United States treasurer

Military figures

- LTC Louis E Dorfman III, Purple Heart recipient

State figures

- Cynthia Dunbar, committeewoman of the Republican National Committee for Virginia

Organizations

- Tea Party Nation, conservative group
- Virginia Citizens Defense League, pro-gun organization
Frank Wagner

Newspapers

- The Washington Post

Individuals

- Elwood Sanders, attorney, contributor to Virginia Right!
- John Watkins, former state senator

=== Polling ===
Poll source	Date(s) administered	Sample size	Margin of error	Ed Gillespie	Corey Stewart	Frank Wagner	Rob Wittman	Other	Undecided
Change Research	June 8–10, 2017	919	± 3.1%	41%	42%	16%	—	—	—
Washington Post-Schar School	May 9–14, 2017	264	± 7.0%	38%	18%	15%	—	—	24%
Quinnipiac University	April 6–10, 2017	435	± 4.7%	28%	12%	7%	—	2%	51%
Christopher Newport University	March 16–26, 2017	349	± 5.7%	38%	11%	10%	—	3%	38%
Quinnipiac University	February 10–15, 2017	419	± 4.8%	24%	7%	2%	—	6%	59%
Christopher Newport University	January 15–28, 2017	418	± 5.0%	33%	7%	9%	—	3%	48%
Quinnipiac University	December 6–11, 2016	451	± 4.6%	24%	4%	4%	10%	—	57%
Public Opinion Strategies	September 18–21, 2016	800	± 3.5%	38%	5%	4%	12%	—	40%
Public Policy Polling (D)	June 13–15, 2016	1,032	± 3.1%	29%	13%	—	16%	—	41%

Hypothetical polling

Poll source	Date(s) administered	Sample size	Margin of error	Bill Bolling	Eric Cantor	Ken Cuccinelli	Ed Gillespie	Mark Obenshain	Pete Snyder	Undecided
Public Policy Polling	July 13–15, 2015	502	4.4%	8%	16%	37%	8%	7%	1%	23%

=== Results ===
Results by county and independent city: Gillespie: Gillespie—60–70%; Gillespie—50–60%; Gillespie—40–50%; Gillespie—<40%; Stewart: Stewart—40–50%; Stewart—50–60%; Stewart—60–70%; Stewart—70–80%

Republican primary results
Party	Candidate	Votes	%
Republican	Ed Gillespie	160,100	43.7%
Republican	Corey Stewart	155,780	42.5%
Republican	Frank Wagner	50,394	13.8%
Total votes		366,274	100.00%

== Libertarian convention ==
=== Candidates ===
==== Nominee ====
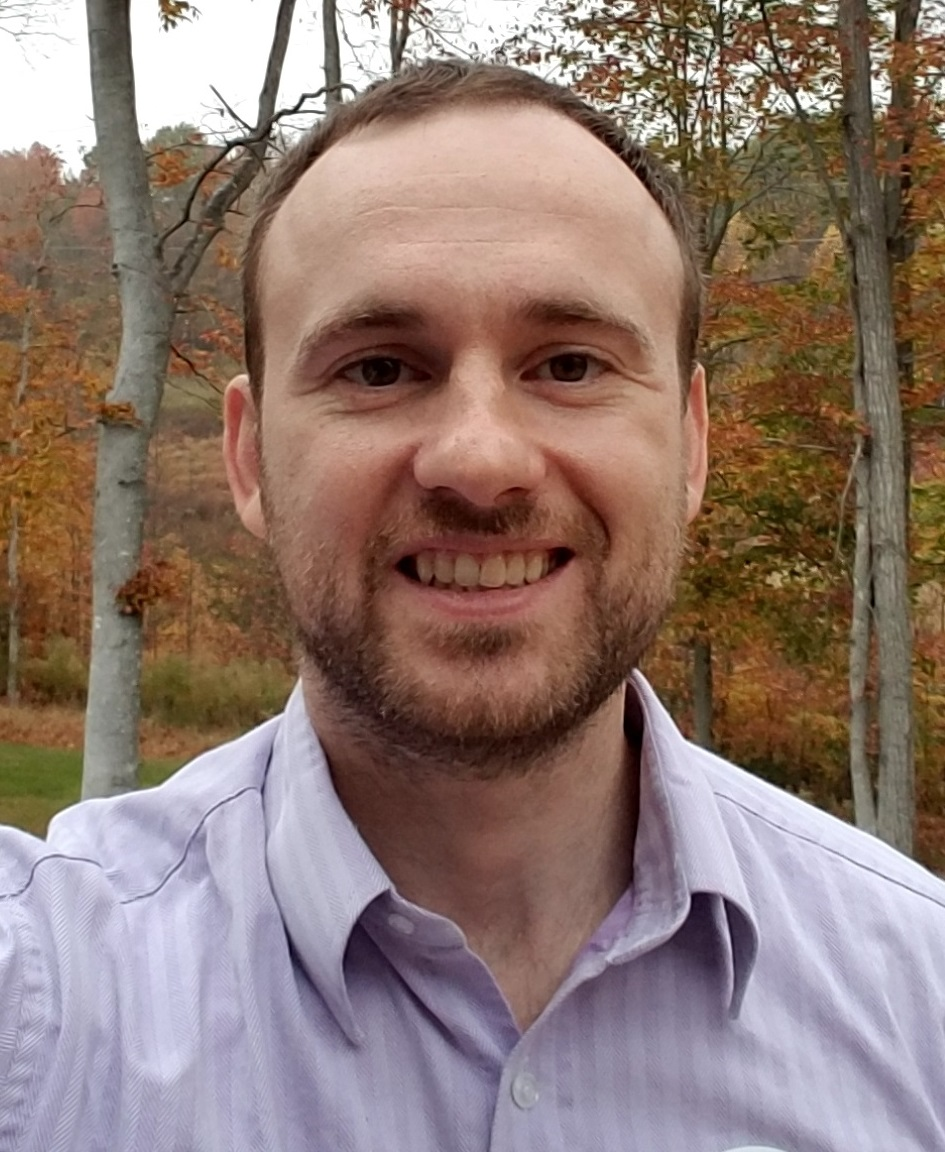
Cliff Hyra, the Libertarian nominee

- Cliff Hyra, attorney

==== Withdrawn ====
- Jason Carrier

== General election ==
The race had been closely watched by national observers. For Republicans, National Review wrote that Gillespie's campaign was an important example of whether and how mainstream Republican politics can produce victories in a purple state in the "era of Trumpism" and said that the outcome would affect Republican strategies in future races. Many Democrats believed that the election was a test of whether the party could find its way after losing the 2016 presidential election and several subsequent special elections. NBC News reported that Northam was the "hand-picked" choice of outgoing governor Terry McAuliffe, and that McAuliffe's legacy and potential 2020 presidential aspirations depended on Northam winning the election.

=== Debates ===
After the primaries, Gillespie challenged Northam to ten debates, but only three were held. The first debate was hosted by the Virginia Bar Association on July 22 in Hot Springs, Virginia. The second was held on September 19, hosted by the Northern Virginia Chamber of Commerce in Tysons Corner, Virginia, and televised statewide by NBC-affiliated TV stations. The third and final debate was held on October 9 at University of Virginia's College at Wise in Wise, Virginia.

Dates	Location	Northam	Gillespie	Link
September 19, 2017	Tysons, Virginia	Participant	Participant	Full debate - C-SPAN
October 9, 2017	Wise, Virginia	Participant	Participant	Full debate - C-SPAN

=== Endorsements ===
Ed Gillespie (R)

Federal officials

- George W. Bush, 43rd president of the United States
- Mike Pence, 48th vice president of the United States
- Donald Trump, 45th president of the United States

U.S. cabinet and U.S. cabinet-level officials

- Steve Bannon, former White House chief strategist
- Nikki Haley, 29th U.S. ambassador to the United Nations and former governor of South Carolina
- Condoleezza Rice, 66th United States secretary of state and former National Security advisor

U.S. senators

- George Allen, former governor of Virginia and former U.S. senator (R-VA)
- Tom Cotton, U.S. senator (R-AR)
- Ted Cruz, U.S. senator (R-TX)
- Rob Portman, U.S. senator (R-OH)
- Marco Rubio, U.S. senator (R-FL)
- Tim Scott, U.S. senator (R-SC)
- John Warner, former U.S. senator (R-VA)

U.S. representatives

- Barbara Comstock, U.S. representative (R-VA)
- Randy Forbes, former U.S. representative (R-VA)
- Newt Gingrich (R-GA), former speaker of the United States House of Representatives
- Bob Goodlatte, U.S. representative (R-VA)
- Morgan Griffith, U.S. representative (R-VA)
- Robert Hurt, former U.S. representative (R-VA)
- Frank Wolf, former U.S. representative (R-VA)

U.S. governors

- Matt Bevin, governor of Kentucky
- Doug Ducey, governor of Arizona
- Jim Gilmore, former governor of Virginia
- Eric Greitens, governor of Missouri
- Larry Hogan, governor of Maryland
- Susana Martinez, governor of New Mexico
- Bob McDonnell, former governor of Virginia
- Mitt Romney, former governor of Massachusetts; Republican nominee for president of the United States in 2012
- Chris Sununu, governor of New Hampshire
- Scott Walker, governor of Wisconsin

Statewide politicians

- John H. Hager, former lieutenant governor of Virginia
- Jerry Kilgore, former attorney general; nominee for governor in 2005

Virginia state senators

- Dick Black, state senator
- Bill Carrico, state senator
- Ben Chafin, state senator
- Amanda Chase, state senator
- John Cosgrove, state senator
- Bill DeSteph, state senator
- Siobhan Dunnavant, state senator
- Emmett Hanger, state senator
- Ryan McDougle, state senator
- Jeff McWaters, state senator
- Stephen Newman, state senator
- Tommy Norment, majority leader of the Virginia Senate
- Mark Obenshain, state senator; nominee for attorney general in 2013
- Mark Peake, state senator
- Bryce Reeves, state senator
- Frank Ruff, state senator
- Ralph Smith, former state senator
- Bill Stanley, state senator
- Richard Stuart, state senator
- Glen Sturtevant, state senator
- David Suetterlein, state senator
- Jill Vogel, state senator, and 2017 Republican nominee for lieutenant governor
- Frank Wagner, state senator

Virginia state delegates

- Les Adams, state delegate
- Dave Albo, state delegate
- Rich Anderson, state delegate
- Terry Austin, state delegate
- Richard Bell, state delegate
- Kathy Byron, state delegate
- Jeff Campbell, state delegate
- Ben Cline, state delegate
- Mark Cole, state delegate
- Chris Collins, state delegate
- Kirk Cox, majority leader of the Virginia House of Delegates
- Glenn Davis, state delegate
- Mark Dudenhefer, state delegate
- James Edmunds, state delegate
- Matt Fariss, state delegate
- Peter Farrell, state delegate
- Buddy Fowler, state delegate
- Scott Garrett, state delegate
- Todd Gilbert, state delegate
- Tag Greason, state delegate
- Chris Head, state delegate
- Gordon Helsel, state delegate
- Keith Hodges, state delegate
- William Howell, speaker of the Virginia House of Delegates
- Tim Hugo, state delegate
- Riley Ingram, state delegate
- Chris Jones, state delegate
- Terry Kilgore, state delegate
- Barry Knight, state delegate
- Steve Landes, state delegate
- Dave LaRock, state delegate
- Jay Leftwich, state delegate
- James LeMunyon, state delegate
- Scott Lingamfelter, state delegate and candidate for lieutenant governor in 2013
- Manoli Loupassi, state delegate
- Danny Marshall, state delegate
- Jimmie Massie, state delegate
- Jackson Miller, state delegate
- Randy Minchew, state delegate
- Jason Miyares, state delegate
- Will Morefield, state delegate
- John O'Bannon, state delegate
- Israel O'Quinn, state delegate
- Bobby Orrock, state delegate
- Todd Pillion, state delegate
- Brenda Pogge, state delegate
- Charles Poindexter, state delegate
- David Ramadan, former state delegate
- Margaret Ransone, state delegate
- Roxann Robinson, state delegate
- Chris Stolle, state delegate
- Ron Villanueva, state delegate
- Lee Ware, state delegate
- Michael Webert, state delegate
- Tony Wilt, state delegate
- Joseph Yost, state delegate

Local officeholders

- Jessica Abbott, Virginia Beach councilwoman
- Preston Banks, Manassas Park city councilmember
- Sheryl Bass, Manassas city councilmember
- Sam Boone, Chesapeake School Board member
- Tony Buffington, Loudoun County supervisor
- David Bushey, Middlesex County sheriff
- Scott Cameron, director of the Northern Virginia Soil and Water Conservation Board
- Thomas Cannella, Poquoson councilman
- Mike Chapman, Loudoun County sheriff
- Bill Cleveland, former Alexandria City mayor
- John Cook, Fairfax County supervisor
- Trevor Craddock, Craig County sheriff
- Christie Craig, Chesapeake School Board member
- Lonnie Craig, Chesapeake councilman
- David Decatur, Stafford County sheriff
- Robert Deeds, sheriff of Williamsburg & James City County
- Willie Deutsch, Prince William County School Board member
- Danny Diggs, sheriff of Poquoson & York County
- Bobby Dyer, Virginia Beach councilman
- Frank Fannon, former Alexandria city councilmember
- Jim Fisher, Fauquier County commonwealth's attorney
- Dave Foster, former Arlington County School Board member
- John Frey, Fairfax County Clerk of Court
- Michael Frey, former Fairfax County scupervisor
- Chip Harding, Albemarle County sheriff
- Roger Harris, Spotsylvania County sheriff
- Pat Herrity, Fairfax County supervisor
- Geary Higgins, Loudoun County supervisor
- Glendell Hill, Prince William County sheriff
- David Hines, Hanover County sheriff
- Jeanette Hough, Fairfax County School Board member
- Robert Ike, Chesapeake councilman
- Milton Johns, former Prince William County School Board chairman
- Frank Jones, former Manassas Park City mayor
- Alan Krasnoff, mayor of Chesapeake
- Colleen Leary, Chesapeake School Board member
- Karl Leonard, Chesterfield County sheriff
- Matthew Letourneau, Loudoun County supervisor
- Ian Lovejoy, Manassas city councilmember
- Wendy Maurer, Stafford County supervisor
- Ron Meyer, Loudoun County supervisor
- Bob Mosier, Fauquier County sheriff
- John Moss, Virginia Beach councilman
- Jim O'Sullivan, Chesapeake City sheriff
- Hal Parrish, mayor of Manassas
- Jim Plowman, Loudoun County commonwealth's attorney
- Victoria Proffitt, Chesapeake School Board member
- Patty Reed, former Fairfax County School Board member
- Debbie Ritter, Chesapeake councilwoman
- Sue Sadler, James City County supervisor
- Elizabeth Schultz, Fairfax County School Board member
- Will Sessoms, mayor of Virginia Beach
- Suzanne Sloane, Fauquier County School Board member
- Gary Snellings, Stafford County supervisor
- Colin Stolle, Virginia Beach commonwealth's attorney
- Ken Stolle, Virginia Beach City sheriff
- Steve Stombres, former Fairfax City mayor
- Louis Tayon, Chesapeake School Board member
- Bob Thomas, Stafford County supervisor
- Mike Wade, Henrico County sheriff
- Jonathan Way, former Manassas City vice mayor
- Rick West, vice mayor of Chesapeake
- Tom Wilson, Fairfax County School Board member
- Patrice Winter, former Fairfax city councilmember
- Pat Woodbury, Newport News councilwoman
- Sandra Young, James City County School Board member
- Benny Zhang, Williamsburg councilman

Party officials and individuals

- Susan Allen, former first lady of Virginia
- Ward Burton, conservation advocate and Daytona 500 winner
- Paris Dennard, politician strategist
- Carly Fiorina, former CEO of Hewlett-Packard and Republican nominee in United States Senate election in California, 2010
- Hugh Hewitt, radio talk show host
- Ronna McDaniel, chair of the Republican National Committee
- Avery Pereira, entrepreneur
- Erich Reimer, financial host, conservative columnist, and television commentator
- Pete Snyder, entrepreneur
- Sean Spicer, former White House press secretary
- Corey Stewart, chairman of the Prince William Board of County Supervisors and former candidate
- Jo Thoburn, chair of the Virginia 10th Congressional District Republican Committee
- Donald Trump Jr., businessman, television personality and son of President Donald Trump
- Eric Trump, businessman, television personality and son of President Donald Trump

Organizations

- Associated Builders and Contractors
- Bikers for Trump
- Citizens for Responsible Energy Solutions
- Michigan Republican Party
- National Federation of Independent Business
- National Right to Life Committee
- Northern Virginia Chamber of Commerce
- Virginia Farm Bureau Federation
- Virginia Fraternal Order of Police
- Virginia Police Benevolent Association
- Virginia Retailers and Merchants Association

Newspapers

- Bluefield Daily Telegraph
- The Daily Progress
- The Free Lance–Star
- National Review
- Richmond Times-Dispatch
- Sun Gazette
- The Winchester Star
Cliff Hyra (L)

Organizations

- Constitution Party of Virginia

Individuals

- Wes Benedict, Libertarian Party activist and official, author of Introduction to the Libertarian Party
- Robert Sarvis, attorney, Libertarian nominee for governor in 2013, Libertarian nominee for United States Senate in 2014
- Bob Shannon, founder of the King William Tea Party
Ralph Northam (D)

Federal officials

- Joe Biden, 47th vice president of the United States
- Barack Obama, 44th president of the United States

U.S. cabinet and U.S. cabinet-level officials

- Hillary Clinton, former United States secretary of state and Democratic nominee for president of the United States in 2016
- Chris Lu, former United States Deputy Secretary of Labor

U.S. senators

- Cory Booker, U.S. senator (D-NJ)
- Al Franken, U.S. senator (D-MN)
- Kamala Harris, U.S. senator (D-CA)
- Tim Kaine, U.S. senator (D-VA), former governor, and Democratic nominee for vice president of the United States in 2016
- Catherine Cortez Masto, U.S. senator (D-NV)
- Mark Warner, U.S. senator (D-VA) and former governor

U.S. representatives

- Don Beyer, U.S. representative (D-VA) and former lieutenant governor
- Keith Ellison, U.S. representative (D-MN) and deputy chair of the Democratic National Committee
- Gabby Giffords, former U.S. representative (D-AZ)
- Donald McEachin, U.S. representative (D-VA)
- Bobby Scott, U.S. representative (D-VA)

U.S. governors

- Howard Dean, former governor of Vermont
- Terry McAuliffe, governor of Virginia

Statewide officeholders

- Alison Lundergan Grimes, secretary of state of Kentucky
- Mark Herring, attorney general of Virginia

Virginia state senators

- George Barker, state senator
- Rosalyn Dance, state senator
- Creigh Deeds, state senator, nominee for attorney general in 2005; nominee for governor in 2009
- Adam Ebbin, state senator
- John Edwards, state senator
- Barbara Favola, state senator
- Janet Howell, state senator
- Lynwood Lewis, state senator
- Mamie Locke, state senator
- Louise Lucas, state senator
- Granger MacFarlane, former state senator
- Dave Marsden, state senator
- Monty Mason, state senator
- Jennifer McClellan, state senator
- Jeremy McPike, state senator
- Chap Petersen, state senator
- Lionell Spruill, state senator
- Scott Surovell, state senator
- Jennifer Wexton, state senator
- Mary Margaret Whipple, former state senator

Virginia state delegates

- Lashrecse Aird, state delegate
- Lamont Bagby, state delegate
- John Bell, state delegate
- Jennifer Boysko, state delegate
- David Bulova, state delegate
- Betsy Carr, state delegate
- Richard Cranwell, former majority leader of the Virginia House of Delegates and former chair of the Democratic Party of Virginia
- Eileen Filler-Corn, state delegate
- Cliff Hayes Jr, state delegate
- Steve Heretick, state delegate
- Charniele Herring, state delegate
- Daun Hester, state delegate
- Patrick Hope, state delegate
- Matthew James, state delegate
- Mark Keam, state delegate
- Kaye Kory, state delegate
- Paul Krizek, state delegate
- Rob Krupicka, former state delegate
- Mark Levine, state delegate
- Joseph Lindsey, state delegate
- Alfonso Lopez, state delegate
- Delores McQuinn, state delegate
- Mike Mullin, state delegate
- Kathleen Murphy, state delegate
- Ken Plum, state delegate
- Marcia Price, state delegate
- Sam Rasoul, state delegate
- Dick Saslaw, minority leader of the Virginia Senate
- Mark Sickles, state delegate
- Marcus Simon, state delegate
- David Speck, former state delegate and former Alexandria city councilman
- Rip Sullivan, state delegate
- Luke Torian, state delegate
- David Toscano, minority leader of the Virginia House of Delegates
- Roslyn Tyler, state delegate
- Jeion Ward, state delegate
- Vivian Watts, state delegate

Local officeholders

- Tim Allen, Roanoke sheriff
- Willie Bailey Sr., Alexandria city councilman
- Wes Bellamy, vice mayor of Charlottesville
- Muriel Bowser, mayor of Washington D.C.
- James Brown, Charlottesville sheriff
- John Chapman, Alexandria city councilman
- Wendy Davis, former Texas state senator; nominee for governor of Texas in 2014
- Jane Dittmar, former chair of the Albemarle County Board of Supervisors; nominee for VA-05 in 2016
- Todd Divers, Charlottesville commissioner of revenue
- Kerry Donley, former mayor of Alexandria and former chair of the Democratic Party of Virginia
- Bill Euille, former mayor of Alexandria
- Andrew Gillum, mayor of Tallahassee
- Karen Graf, Alexandria School Board member
- Nancy Horn, Roanoke County Commissioner of Revenue
- Dana Lawhorne, Alexandria sheriff
- Sherman Lea, mayor of Roanoke
- Tim Lovain, Alexandria city councilman
- Andria McClellan, Norfolk city councilwoman
- Steve McGraw, Roanoke County clerk of court
- Del Pepper, Alexandria city councilwoman
- Bryan Porter, Alexandria Commonwealth Attorney
- Anita Price, vice mayor of Roanoke
- Lonnie Rich, former Alexandria city councilman and former chair of the Alexandria Democratic Committee
- Ed Semonian, Alexandria clerk of court
- Mike Signer, mayor of Charlottesville
- Allison Silberberg, mayor of Alexandria
- Paul Smedberg, Alexandria city councilman and former chair of the Alexandria Democratic Committee
- Levar Stoney, mayor of Richmond and former secretary of the Commonwealth of Virginia
- Kristin Szakos, Charlottesville city councilwoman
- David Trinkle, Roanoke city councilman
- Justin Wilson, vice mayor of Alexandria

Party officials and individuals

- John W. Douglass, retired Air Force brigadier general, former assistant secretary of the Navy; nominee for VA-05 in 2012
- Joe Fitzgerald, former chair of the Virginia 6th Congressional District Democratic Committee
- Lori Haas, Virginia state director of the Coalition to Stop Gun Violence
- Mike Hamlar, political activist and 2015 State Senate candidate
- Dak Hardwick, former chair of the Alexandria Democratic Committee
- Jaime Harrison, chair of the South Carolina Democratic Party
- Lisa Hystad, chairwoman of the Virginia 5th Congressional District Democratic Committee
- Susan Kellom, former chair of the Alexandria Democratic Committee
- Derek Kitts, nominee for VA-09 in 2016
- Greg Louganis, former Olympic swimmer and activist
- Clark Mercer, former chair of the Alexandria Democratic Committee
- Alyssa Milano, actress and activist
- Pat Mulloy, Democratic Party of Virginia Central Committee member
- Bill Ney, chair of the Virginia 6th Congressional District Democratic Committee
- Patton Oswalt, actor
- Adam Parkhomenko, political strategist
- Piper Perabo, actress
- Charles Price, executive director of the Harrison Museum of African American History
- Mark Ruffalo, actor
- Isaac Sarver, chair of the Virginia 9th Congressional District Democratic Committee
- Stephanie Schriock, president of EMILY's List

Organizations

- American Federation of Teachers
- American Muslim Women PAC
- Americans for Responsible Solutions
- Brady Campaign to Prevent Gun Violence
- CASA in Action
- Clean Water Action
- Coalition to Stop Gun Violence
- EmgagePAC
- Equality Virginia
- Human Rights Campaign
- Humane Dominion
- Laborers' International Union of North America
- LGBT Democrats of Virginia
- NARAL Pro-Choice America
- NARAL Pro-Choice Virginia
- National Black Farmers Association
- Newton Action Alliance
- NPE Action
- Planned Parenthood Advocates of Virginia
- Pride Fund to End Gun Violence
- Virginia AFL-CIO
- Virginia Credit Union League
- Virginia Education Association
- Virginia House Democratic Caucus
- Virginia League of Conservation Voters
- Virginia National Organization for Women
- Virginia Professional Fire Fighters
- Virginia Senate Democratic Caucus
- Virginia Sierra Club
- Virginia Transportation Construction Alliance
- VoteVets.org

Newspapers

- Daily Press
- Falls Church News-Press
- Richmond Free Press
- The Virginian-Pilot
- The Washington Post

=== Predictions ===
Source	Ranking	As of
The Cook Political Report	Lean D	October 6, 2017
Rothenberg Political Report	Tilt D	October 27, 2017
Sabato's Crystal Ball	Lean D	October 13, 2017

=== Polling ===
Polls for the general election varied significantly, ranging from a 17-point lead for Ralph Northam on one end to an 8-point lead for Ed Gillespie on the other, with most polls showing the race within or close to the margin of error. Politico reported that the wide variation in polling numbers was likely due to differences in methodology among the polls. Polls tightened significantly in the last two weeks of the campaign with several showing the race tied or within the margin of error.

Aggregate polls

Source of poll aggregation	Dates administered	Dates updated	Ralph Northam (D)	Ed Gillespie (R)	Other/Undecided (Note: Calculated by taking the difference of 100% and all other candidates combined.)	Margin
Real Clear Politics	October 29 – November 5, 2017	November 5, 2017	47.7%	44.4%	7.9%	Northam +3.3%

Poll source	Date(s) administered	Sample size	Margin of error	Ralph Northam (D)	Ed Gillespie (R)	Cliff Hyra (L)	Other	Undecided
FOX News	November 2–5, 2017	1,239 LV	± 2.5%	48%	43%	3%	1%	7%
FOX News	November 2–5, 2017	1,450 RV	± 2.5%	45%	41%	3%	1%	9%
The Polling Company (R)	November 2–5, 2017	800	± 3.5%	45%	44%	3%	–	4%
The Polling Company (R)	November 2–5, 2017	800	± 3.5%	47%	46%	–	–	4%
Monmouth University	November 2–5, 2017	713	± 3.7%	47%	45%	3%	1%	5%
IMGE Insights (R)	November 1–5, 2017	800	± 3.5%	48%	47%	—	—	—
Change Research	November 1–5, 2017	3,648	± 2.8%	52%	46%	2%	–	0%
Quinnipiac University	October 30 – November 5, 2017	1,056	± 3.9%	51%	42%	3%	–	4%
Emerson College	November 2–4, 2017	810	± 3.4%	49%	46%	1%	–	4%
Christopher Newport University	October 29 – November 4, 2017	839	± 3.5%	51%	45%	2%	–	2%
Rasmussen Reports	October 31 – November 3, 2017	875	± 3.5%	45%	45%	2%	2%	6%
Gravis Marketing	October 30 – November 3, 2017	1,143	± 2.9%	48%	43%	3%	–	6%
0ptimus (R)	November 1–2, 2017	1,600	± 2.4%	37%	40%	–	–	23%
Trafalgar Group (R)	October 31 – November 2, 2017	1,200	± 3.3%	49%	48%	1%	–	2%
The Polling Company (R)	October 30 – November 2, 2017	800	± 3.5%	43%	45%	2%	–	7%
The Polling Company (R)	October 30 – November 2, 2017	800	± 3.5%	43%	46%	–	–	7%
Upshot/Siena College	October 29 – November 2, 2017	985	± 3.0%	43%	40%	2%	–	14%
Roanoke College	October 29 – November 2, 2017	781	± 3.5%	47%	47%	3%	–	3%
Suffolk University	October 30 – November 1, 2017	500	± 4.4%	47%	43%	2%	–	6%
Washington Post/Schar School	October 26–29, 2017	921 LV	± 4.0%	49%	44%	4%	–	3%
Washington Post/Schar School	October 26–29, 2017	1,000 RV	± 3.5%	46%	39%	5%	–	5%
Quinnipiac University	October 25–29, 2017	916	± 4.2%	53%	36%	3%	–	7%
The Polling Company (R)	October 24–26, 2017	600 LV	± 4.0%	44%	44%	3%	–	7%
The Polling Company (R)	October 23–26, 2017	800 LV	± 3.5%	43%	45%	–	–	9%
Christopher Newport University	October 20–25, 2017	812	± 3.8%	50%	43%	3%	–	4%
Plural Vote	October 15–25, 2017	397	± 4.9%	49%	46%	5%	–	–
Hampton University	October 18–22, 2017	750	± 4.2%	33%	41%	–	–	27%
FOX News	October 15–17, 2017	697 LV	± 3.5%	49%	42%	1%	2%	5%
FOX News	October 15–17, 2017	815 RV	± 3.0%	45%	42%	2%	2%	6%
Quinnipiac University	October 12–17, 2017	1,088	± 3.7%	53%	39%	2%	–	5%
Monmouth University	October 12–16, 2017	408	± 4.9%	47%	48%	3%	–	3%
Christopher Newport University	October 9–13, 2017	642	± 4.2%	48%	44%	3%	–	5%
Roanoke College	October 8–13, 2017	607	± 4.0%	50%	44%	2%	–	4%
Emerson College	October 5–7, 2017	318	± 5.5%	49%	44%	2%	–	5%
Christopher Newport University	October 2–6, 2017	928	± 4.3%	49%	42%	3%	–	6%
Washington Post/Schar School	September 28 – October 2, 2017	720 LV	± 4.5%	53%	40%	4%	–	2%
Washington Post/Schar School	September 28 – October 2, 2017	1,000 RV	± 3.5%	48%	38%	5%	–	5%
Victoria Research (D)	September 24–28, 2017	631	± 4.2%	46%	44%	3%	–	–
Monmouth University	September 21–25, 2017	499	± 4.4%	49%	44%	2%	<1%	4%
Public Policy Polling	September 21–23, 2017	849	± 3.8%	43%	40%	4%	–	13%
Roanoke College	September 16–23, 2017	596	± 4.0%	47%	43%	5%	–	5%
Christopher Newport University	September 12–22, 2017	776	± 3.7%	47%	41%	4%	–	8%
FOX News	September 17–18, 2017	500 LV	± 4.5%	42%	41%	2%	2%	12%
FOX News	September 17–18, 2017	507 RV	± 4.0%	42%	38%	2%	2%	13%
Quinnipiac University	September 14–18, 2017	850	± 4.2%	51%	41%	3%	–	5%
IMGE Insights (R)	September 12–18, 2017	1,000	± 3.8%	45%	41%	4%	–	10%
Suffolk University	September 13–17, 2017	500	± 4.4%	42%	42%	3%	–	12%
Mason-Dixon	September 10–15, 2017	625	± 4%	44%	43%	2%	–	11%
University of Mary Washington	September 5–12, 2017	562 LV	± 5.2%	44%	39%	3%	1%	11%
University of Mary Washington	September 5–12, 2017	867 RV	± 4.1%	40%	35%	5%	–	16%
Roanoke College	August 12–19, 2017	599	± 4.0%	43%	36%	4%	–	17%
Quinnipiac University	August 3–8, 2017	1,082	± 3.8%	44%	38%	4%	1%	11%
Virginia Commonwealth University	July 17–25, 2017	538 LV	± 5.1%	42%	37%	6%	–	13%
Virginia Commonwealth University	July 17–25, 2017	707 RV	± 4.5%	39%	33%	8%	–	16%
Monmouth University	July 20–23, 2017	502	± 4.4%	44%	44%	3%	<1%	9%
Quinnipiac University	June 15–20, 2017	1,145	± 3.8%	47%	39%	–	2%	9%
Harper Polling	June 14–16, 2017	500	± 4.4%	46%	46%	–	–	8%
Public Opinion Strategies (R)	June 6–8, 2017	600	± 4.0%	45%	46%	–	–	9%
Washington Post/Schar School	May 9–14, 2017	1,602	± 3.0%	49%	38%	–	–	9%
Quinnipiac University	April 6–10, 2017	1,115	± 2.9%	44%	33%	–	1%	19%
Christopher Newport University	March 16–26, 2017	831	± 3.7%	39%	40%	–	2%	19%
Gravis Marketing	March 14–19, 2017	3,097	± 1.6%	40%	42%	–	–	18%
Quinnipiac University	February 10–15, 2017	989	± 3.1%	41%	35%	–	3%	22%
Mason-Dixon	January 5–10, 2017	625	± 4.0%	41%	44%	–	–	15%
Public Opinion Strategies (R)	December 11–13, 2016	500	± 4.4%	43%	38%	–	–	17%
Quinnipiac University	December 6–11, 2016	1,098	± 3.0%	38%	34%	–	1%	26%
University of Mary Washington	September 6–12, 2016	685 LV	± 4.4%	36%	43%	–	1%	16%
University of Mary Washington	September 6–12, 2016	852 RV	± 3.9%	36%	41%	–	1%	18%
Public Policy Polling	September 9–11, 2016	878	± 3.3%	37%	37%	–	–	26%
Public Policy Polling	June 13–15, 2016	1,032	± 3.1%	36%	37%	–	–	28%
Gravis Marketing	May 24, 2016	1,728	± 2.0%	38%	40%	–	–	22%
University of Mary Washington	November 4–9, 2015	656 LV	± 4.3%	32%	44%	–	1%	16%
University of Mary Washington	November 4–9, 2015	814 RV	± 3.9%	33%	40%	–	1%	18%
Public Policy Polling	July 13–15, 2015	1,170	± 2.9%	30%	40%	–	–	32%

Hypothetical polling

Poll source	Date(s) administered	Sample size	Margin of error	Tom Perriello (D)	Ed Gillespie (R)	Other	Undecided
Washington Post/Schar School	May 9–14, 2017	1,602	± 3.0%	50%	37%	–	9%
Quinnipiac University	April 6–10, 2017	1,115	± 2.9%	46%	33%	1%	18%
Christopher Newport University	March 16–26, 2017	831	± 3.7%	39%	39%	2%	20%
Gravis Marketing	March 14–19, 2017	3,097	± 1.6%	42%	41%	–	18%
Quinnipiac University	February 10–15, 2017	989	± 3.1%	43%	36%	1%	20%
Mason-Dixon	January 5–10, 2017	625	± 4.0%	36%	45%	–	19%

with Corey Stewart

Poll source	Date(s) administered	Sample size	Margin of error	Ralph Northam (D)	Corey Stewart (R)	Other	Undecided
Quinnipiac University	April 6–10, 2017	1,115	± 2.9%	43%	30%	1%	23%
Christopher Newport University	March 16–26, 2017	831	± 3.7%	41%	33%	2%	24%
Quinnipiac University	February 10–15, 2017	989	± 3.1%	42%	31%	2%	24%
Mason-Dixon	January 5–10, 2017	625	± 4.0%	45%	37%	–	18%
Public Opinion Strategies (R)	December 11–13, 2016	500	± 4.4%	42%	35%	–	22%
Quinnipiac University	December 6–11, 2016	1,098	± 3.0%	38%	29%	1%	30%
University of Mary Washington	September 6–12, 2016	685 LV	± 4.4%	39%	39%	1%	18%
University of Mary Washington	September 6–12, 2016	852 RV	± 3.9%	39%	37%	1%	19%
Public Policy Polling	September 9–11, 2016	878	± 3.3%	39%	31%	–	30%
Public Policy Polling	June 13–15, 2016	1,032	± 3.1%	34%	32%	–	34%

Poll source	Date(s) administered	Sample size	Margin of error	Tom Perriello (D)	Corey Stewart (R)	Other	Undecided
Quinnipiac University	April 6–10, 2017	1,115	± 2.9%	45%	31%	1%	20%
Christopher Newport University	March 16–26, 2017	831	± 3.7%	40%	34%	2%	25%
Quinnipiac University	February 10–15, 2017	989	± 3.1%	44%	31%	3%	22%
Mason-Dixon	January 5–10, 2017	625	± 4.0%	40%	38%	–	22%

with Frank Wagner

Poll source	Date(s) administered	Sample size	Margin of error	Ralph Northam (D)	Frank Wagner (R)	Other	Undecided
Quinnipiac University	April 6–10, 2017	1,115	± 2.9%	43%	30%	1%	24%
Christopher Newport University	March 16–26, 2017	831	± 3.7%	40%	34%	2%	25%
Quinnipiac University	February 10–15, 2017	989	± 3.1%	41%	33%	3%	24%
Public Opinion Strategies (R)	December 11–13, 2016	500	± 4.4%	43%	37%	–	19%
Quinnipiac University	December 6–11, 2016	1,098	± 3.0%	39%	30%	1%	28%
University of Mary Washington	September 6–12, 2016	685 LV	± 4.4%	39%	40%	1%	17%
University of Mary Washington	September 6–12, 2016	852 RV	± 3.9%	39%	39%	1%	18%
Public Policy Polling	September 9–11, 2016	878	± 3.3%	37%	32%	–	32%

Poll source	Date(s) administered	Sample size	Margin of error	Tom Perriello (D)	Frank Wagner (R)	Other	Undecided
Quinnipiac University	April 6–10, 2017	1,115	± 2.9%	43%	32%	1%	21%
Christopher Newport University	March 16–26, 2017	831	± 3.7%	38%	35%	2%	25%
Quinnipiac University	February 10–15, 2017	989	± 3.1%	43%	32%	2%	23%

with Denver Riggleman

Poll source	Date(s) administered	Sample size	Margin of error	Ralph Northam (D)	Denver Riggleman (R)	Other	Undecided
Quinnipiac University	February 10–15, 2017	989	± 3.1%	42%	31%	2%	25%

Poll source	Date(s) administered	Sample size	Margin of error	Tom Perriello (D)	Denver Riggleman (R)	Other	Undecided
Quinnipiac University	February 10–15, 2017	989	± 3.1%	43%	30%	2%	24%

with Rob Wittman

Poll source	Date(s) administered	Sample size	Margin of error	Ralph Northam (D)	Rob Wittman (R)	Other	Undecided
Quinnipiac University	December 6–11, 2016	1,098	± 3.0%	39%	30%	1%	29%
University of Mary Washington	September 6–12, 2016	685 LV	± 4.4%	38%	38%	1%	18%
University of Mary Washington	September 6–12, 2016	852 RV	± 3.9%	39%	37%	1%	19%
Public Policy Polling	September 9–11, 2016	878	± 3.3%	38%	33%	–	29%
Public Policy Polling	June 13–15, 2016	1,032	± 3.1%	34%	34%	–	32%

with Ken Cuccinelli

Poll source	Date(s) administered	Sample size	Margin of error	Ralph Northam (D)	Ken Cuccinelli (R)	Other	Undecided
Public Policy Polling	July 13–15, 2015	1,170	± 2.9%	35%	37%	–	28%

with Eric Cantor

Poll source	Date(s) administered	Sample size	Margin of error	Ralph Northam (D)	Eric Cantor (R)	Other	Undecided
Public Policy Polling	July 13–15, 2015	1,170	± 2.9%	33%	35%	–	32%

with Mark Herring

Poll source	Date(s) administered	Sample size	Margin of error	Mark Herring (D)	Eric Cantor (R)	Other	Undecided
Public Policy Polling	July 13–15, 2015	1,170	± 2.9%	36%	33%	–	31%

Poll source	Date(s) administered	Sample size	Margin of error	Mark Herring (D)	Ken Cuccinelli (R)	Other	Undecided
Public Policy Polling	July 13–15, 2015	1,170	± 2.9%	38%	38%	–	24%

Poll source	Date(s) administered	Sample size	Margin of error	Mark Herring (D)	Ed Gillespie (R)	Other	Undecided
Public Policy Polling	July 13–15, 2015	1,170	± 2.9%	34%	38%	–	28%

Poll source	Date(s) administered	Sample size	Margin of error	Mark Herring (D)	Mark Obenshain (R)	Other	Undecided
Public Policy Polling	July 13–15, 2015	1,170	± 2.9%	34%	34%	–	31%

with Ralph Northam

Poll source	Date(s) administered	Sample size	Margin of error	Ralph Northam (D)	Mark Obenshain (R)	Other	Undecided
Public Policy Polling	July 13–15, 2015	1,170	± 2.9%	32%	36%	–	32%

=== Fundraising ===
Campaign finance reports as of November 30, 2017
Candidate	Amount raised
Ralph Northam	$36,708,929
Ed Gillespie	$29,344,226
Cliff Hyra	$77,370
Source: Virginia Public Access Project

Virginia election laws allow for unlimited campaign contributions in state and local elections.

According to the Virginia Public Access Project, Northam's top five donors were the Democratic Governors Association's super PAC DGA Action, Michael Bloomberg's Everytown for Gun Safety group, the Virginia League of Conservation Voters, Michael D. Bills, and the Laborers' International Union of North America.

Gillespie's top five donors were the Republican Governors Association, A Stronger Virginia, Let's Grow Virginia, Marlene Ricketts, and Dwight Schar.

Hyra's top five donors were Michael Chastain, Hyra himself, the Libertarian Party of Virginia, Paradise Indian Restaurant, and nine donors who gave the same amount.

== Results ==
Even though polls in the weeks before the election considered Northam to be the narrow favorite, Northam won by a larger margin than expected, about nine percent, and more than 200,000 votes. Gillespie was unable to come back from the large margins in the suburbs of Washington, D.C. and Virginia Beach, and he conceded to Northam at 8:56 pm EST. Northam's wider than expected margin of victory has often been attributed to Trump's unpopularity in Virginia.

2017 Virginia gubernatorial election
Party	Candidate	Votes	%	±%
Democratic	Ralph Northam	1,408,818	53.89%	+6.15%
Republican	Ed Gillespie	1,175,732	44.98%	−0.24%
Libertarian	Cliff Hyra	27,987	1.07%	−5.45%
Write-in		1,528	0.06%	–0.47%
Total votes		2,614,065	100.00%	N/A
Democratic hold				

=== By county and independent city ===
Locality	Ralph Northam Democratic		Ed Gillespie Republican		Various candidates Other parties		Margin		Total
Locality	#	%	#	%	#	%	#	%	Total
Accomack	4,876	45.72%	5,736	53.78%	54	0.51%	-860	-8.06%	10,666
Albemarle	26,969	63.74%	14,857	35.12%	482	1.14%	12,112	28.63%	42,308
Alexandria	40,896	78.36%	10,822	20.74%	471	0.90%	30,074	57.63%	52,189
Alleghany	1,478	33.57%	2,888	65.59%	37	0.84%	-1,410	-32.02%	4,403
Amelia	1,403	30.41%	3,170	68.70%	41	0.89%	-1,767	-38.30%	4,614
Amherst	3,258	33.29%	6,431	65.72%	97	0.99%	-3,173	-32.42%	9,786
Appomattox	1,227	23.72%	3,894	75.29%	51	0.99%	-2,667	-51.57%	5,172
Arlington	68,093	79.91%	16,268	19.09%	853	1.00%	51,825	60.82%	85,214
Augusta	6,030	25.58%	17,217	73.03%	327	1.39%	-11,187	-47.45%	23,574
Bath	450	30.36%	1,013	68.35%	19	1.28%	-563	-37.99%	1,482
Bedford	6,985	25.12%	20,573	73.98%	249	0.90%	-13,588	-48.87%	27,807
Bland	388	18.61%	1,676	80.38%	21	1.01%	-1,288	-61.77%	2,085
Botetourt	3,409	27.27%	8,965	71.71%	128	1.02%	-5,556	-44.44%	12,502
Bristol	1,242	28.92%	3,006	70.00%	46	1.07%	-1,764	-41.08%	4,294
Brunswick	2,728	57.35%	2,010	42.25%	19	0.40%	718	15.09%	4,757
Buchanan	1,062	23.38%	3,449	75.94%	31	0.68%	-2,387	-52.55%	4,542
Buckingham	1,924	41.81%	2,638	57.32%	40	0.87%	-714	-15.51%	4,602
Buena Vista	529	31.96%	1,090	65.86%	36	2.18%	-561	-33.90%	1,655
Campbell	4,415	25.41%	12,791	73.63%	167	0.96%	-8,376	-48.21%	17,373
Caroline	4,126	49.35%	4,135	49.46%	99	1.18%	-9	-0.11%	8,360
Carroll	1,838	22.21%	6,363	76.88%	76	0.92%	-4,525	-54.67%	8,277
Charles City	1,699	62.56%	1,000	36.82%	17	0.63%	699	25.74%	2,716
Charlotte	1,419	35.35%	2,559	63.75%	36	0.90%	-1,140	-28.40%	4,014
Charlottesville	13,943	84.77%	2,315	14.07%	190	1.16%	11,628	70.70%	16,448
Chesapeake	38,459	53.09%	33,108	45.70%	880	1.21%	5,351	7.39%	72,447
Chesterfield	58,991	49.71%	58,297	49.13%	1,381	1.16%	694	0.58%	118,669
Clarke	2,400	43.07%	3,102	55.67%	70	1.26%	-702	-12.60%	5,572
Colonial Heights	1,389	26.90%	3,710	71.84%	65	1.26%	-2,321	-44.95%	5,164
Covington	545	40.61%	784	58.42%	13	0.97%	-239	-17.81%	1,342
Craig	413	22.43%	1,398	75.94%	30	1.63%	-985	-53.50%	1,841
Culpeper	4,990	36.73%	8,423	61.99%	174	1.28%	-3,433	-25.27%	13,587
Cumberland	1,292	41.21%	1,810	57.74%	33	1.05%	-518	-16.52%	3,135
Danville	6,304	57.16%	4,664	42.29%	60	0.54%	1,640	14.87%	11,028
Dickenson	959	27.84%	2,458	71.35%	28	0.81%	-1,499	-43.51%	3,445
Dinwiddie	3,712	44.54%	4,565	54.77%	58	0.70%	-853	-10.23%	8,335
Emporia	909	55.66%	702	42.99%	22	1.35%	207	12.68%	1,633
Essex	1,730	46.47%	1,963	52.73%	30	0.81%	-233	-6.26%	3,723
Fairfax City	5,380	64.82%	2,822	34.00%	98	1.18%	2,558	30.82%	8,300
Fairfax County	255,200	67.87%	117,141	31.15%	3,663	0.97%	138,059	36.72%	376,004
Falls Church	4,781	78.97%	1,195	19.74%	78	1.29%	3,586	59.23%	6,054
Fauquier	9,430	39.23%	14,332	59.62%	277	1.15%	-4,902	-20.39%	24,039
Floyd	1,946	35.44%	3,468	63.16%	77	1.40%	-1,522	-27.72%	5,491
Fluvanna	4,267	46.25%	4,864	52.73%	94	1.02%	-597	-6.47%	9,225
Franklin City	1,539	60.21%	1,002	39.20%	15	0.59%	537	21.01%	2,556
Franklin County	5,315	30.22%	12,062	68.58%	211	1.20%	-6,747	-38.36%	17,588
Frederick	8,363	34.39%	15,656	64.39%	296	1.22%	-7,293	-29.99%	24,315
Fredericksburg	4,649	64.38%	2,463	34.11%	109	1.51%	2,186	30.27%	7,221
Galax	409	30.18%	930	68.63%	16	1.18%	-521	-38.45%	1,355
Giles	1,604	27.49%	4,161	71.32%	69	1.18%	-2,557	-43.83%	5,834
Gloucester	4,356	34.41%	8,159	64.45%	144	1.14%	-3,803	-30.04%	12,659
Goochland	3,911	37.10%	6,520	61.85%	110	1.04%	-2,609	-24.75%	10,541
Grayson	1,029	22.68%	3,478	76.66%	30	0.66%	-2,449	-53.98%	4,537
Greene	2,219	35.17%	4,000	63.40%	90	1.43%	-1,781	-28.23%	6,309
Greensville	1,643	56.79%	1,232	42.59%	18	0.62%	411	14.21%	2,893
Halifax	4,037	38.77%	6,291	60.41%	86	0.83%	-2,254	-21.64%	10,414
Hampton	28,906	71.58%	11,050	27.36%	428	1.06%	17,856	44.22%	40,384
Hanover	14,755	34.19%	27,779	64.37%	623	1.44%	-13,024	-30.18%	43,157
Harrisonburg	6,555	63.57%	3,596	34.87%	161	1.56%	2,959	28.69%	10,312
Henrico	69,969	60.82%	43,747	38.03%	1,321	1.15%	26,222	22.79%	115,037
Henry	4,895	34.82%	9,046	64.35%	116	0.83%	-4,151	-29.53%	14,057
Highland	317	30.66%	699	67.60%	18	1.74%	-382	-36.94%	1,034
Hopewell	2,728	49.97%	2,641	48.38%	90	1.65%	87	1.59%	5,459
Isle of Wight	5,957	42.18%	8,039	56.92%	127	0.90%	-2,082	-14.74%	14,123
James City	15,561	48.93%	15,937	50.11%	303	0.95%	-376	-1.18%	31,801
King and Queen	1,039	42.03%	1,404	56.80%	29	1.17%	-365	-14.77%	2,472
King George	2,658	37.18%	4,396	61.49%	95	1.33%	-1,738	-24.31%	7,149
King William	2,017	33.75%	3,889	65.07%	71	1.19%	-1,872	-31.32%	5,977
Lancaster	2,098	43.64%	2,680	55.74%	30	0.62%	-582	-12.10%	4,808
Lee	1,304	19.53%	5,289	79.20%	85	1.27%	-3,985	-59.67%	6,678
Lexington	1,161	66.46%	572	32.74%	14	0.80%	589	33.71%	1,747
Loudoun	69,778	59.39%	46,396	39.49%	1,312	1.12%	23,382	19.90%	117,486
Louisa	4,481	37.96%	7,153	60.60%	169	1.43%	-2,672	-22.64%	11,803
Lunenburg	1,468	40.22%	2,158	59.12%	24	0.66%	-690	-18.90%	3,650
Lynchburg	10,047	47.15%	10,959	51.43%	301	1.41%	-912	-4.28%	21,307
Madison	1,789	36.28%	3,082	62.50%	60	1.22%	-1,293	-26.22%	4,931
Manassas	5,295	56.86%	3,899	41.87%	118	1.27%	1,396	14.99%	9,312
Manassas Park	1,958	63.65%	1,064	34.59%	54	1.76%	894	29.06%	3,076
Martinsville	2,187	58.55%	1,489	39.87%	59	1.58%	698	18.69%	3,735
Mathews	1,386	35.09%	2,531	64.08%	33	0.84%	-1,145	-28.99%	3,950
Mecklenburg	3,399	39.70%	5,125	59.86%	37	0.43%	-1,726	-20.16%	8,561
Middlesex	1,606	37.18%	2,673	61.88%	41	0.95%	-1,067	-24.70%	4,320
Montgomery	15,115	53.73%	12,500	44.43%	518	1.84%	2,615	9.30%	28,133
Nelson	3,015	48.83%	3,020	48.91%	139	2.25%	-5	-0.08%	6,174
New Kent	2,729	31.91%	5,711	66.78%	112	1.31%	-2,982	-34.87%	8,552
Newport News	30,367	64.66%	15,986	34.04%	611	1.30%	14,381	30.62%	46,964
Norfolk	39,453	73.51%	13,490	25.14%	727	1.35%	25,963	48.38%	53,670
Northampton	2,492	56.92%	1,855	42.37%	31	0.71%	637	14.55%	4,378
Northumberland	2,022	37.83%	3,285	61.46%	38	0.71%	-1,263	-23.63%	5,345
Norton	287	33.37%	561	65.23%	12	1.40%	-274	-31.86%	860
Nottoway	1,812	42.64%	2,408	56.66%	30	0.71%	-596	-14.02%	4,250
Orange	4,160	38.11%	6,653	60.95%	102	0.93%	-2,493	-22.84%	10,915
Page	1,809	26.90%	4,850	72.11%	67	1.00%	-3,041	-45.21%	6,726
Patrick	1,259	22.35%	4,320	76.69%	54	0.96%	-3,061	-54.34%	5,633
Petersburg	7,164	87.72%	938	11.49%	65	0.80%	6,226	76.23%	8,167
Pittsylvania	5,759	29.42%	13,701	70.00%	113	0.58%	-7,942	-40.58%	19,573
Poquoson	1,298	26.87%	3,473	71.90%	59	1.22%	-2,175	-45.03%	4,830
Portsmouth	20,156	70.21%	8,167	28.45%	387	1.35%	11,989	41.76%	28,710
Powhatan	3,109	27.02%	8,256	71.75%	141	1.23%	-5,147	-44.73%	11,506
Prince Edward	2,881	50.96%	2,708	47.90%	65	1.15%	173	3.06%	5,654
Prince George	4,150	40.27%	6,044	58.65%	112	1.09%	-1,894	-18.38%	10,306
Prince William	74,932	61.05%	46,454	37.85%	1,346	1.10%	28,478	23.20%	122,732
Pulaski	3,533	29.99%	8,081	68.61%	165	1.40%	-4,548	-38.61%	11,779
Radford	2,163	54.90%	1,707	43.32%	70	1.78%	456	11.57%	3,940
Rappahannock	1,488	45.27%	1,772	53.91%	27	0.82%	-284	-8.64%	3,287
Richmond City	58,047	81.46%	12,262	17.21%	952	1.34%	45,785	64.25%	71,261
Richmond County	876	36.95%	1,479	62.38%	16	0.67%	-603	-25.43%	2,371
Roanoke City	15,099	62.02%	8,890	36.52%	355	1.46%	6,209	25.51%	24,344
Roanoke County	12,650	37.50%	20,648	61.22%	432	1.28%	-7,998	-23.71%	33,730
Rockbridge	2,974	37.49%	4,873	61.43%	86	1.08%	-1,899	-23.94%	7,933
Rockingham	7,061	27.94%	17,880	70.76%	329	1.30%	-10,819	-42.81%	25,270
Russell	1,506	22.44%	5,144	76.65%	61	0.91%	-3,638	-54.21%	6,711
Salem	3,134	38.24%	4,946	60.35%	116	1.42%	-1,812	-22.11%	8,196
Scott	1,089	17.74%	4,997	81.40%	53	0.86%	-3,908	-63.66%	6,139
Shenandoah	3,932	29.53%	9,220	69.25%	163	1.22%	-5,288	-39.71%	13,315
Smyth	1,747	22.01%	6,107	76.92%	85	1.07%	-4,360	-54.92%	7,939
Southampton	2,529	41.09%	3,564	57.90%	62	1.01%	-1,035	-16.82%	6,155
Spotsylvania	15,869	43.12%	20,481	55.66%	448	1.22%	-4,612	-12.53%	36,798
Stafford	19,011	46.77%	21,123	51.97%	510	1.25%	-2,112	-5.20%	40,644
Staunton	4,047	53.33%	3,406	44.88%	136	1.79%	641	8.45%	7,589
Suffolk	16,621	58.25%	11,623	40.74%	288	1.01%	4,998	17.52%	28,532
Surry	1,658	56.03%	1,268	42.85%	33	1.12%	390	13.18%	2,959
Sussex	1,829	55.69%	1,429	43.51%	26	0.79%	400	12.18%	3,284
Tazewell	1,657	16.41%	8,373	82.93%	66	0.65%	-6,716	-66.52%	10,096
Virginia Beach	66,442	51.85%	60,073	46.88%	1,623	1.27%	6,369	4.97%	128,138
Warren	3,531	34.04%	6,711	64.70%	131	1.26%	-3,180	-30.66%	10,373
Washington	4,003	24.40%	12,247	74.66%	154	0.94%	-8,244	-50.26%	16,404
Waynesboro	2,653	45.00%	3,144	53.33%	98	1.66%	-491	-8.33%	5,895
Westmoreland	2,442	45.56%	2,865	53.45%	53	0.99%	-423	-7.89%	5,360
Williamsburg	3,725	70.64%	1,492	28.30%	56	1.06%	2,233	42.35%	5,273
Winchester	3,569	53.69%	2,969	44.66%	110	1.65%	600	9.03%	6,648
Wise	1,910	22.14%	6,630	76.84%	88	1.02%	-4,720	-54.71%	8,628
Wythe	2,114	24.83%	6,321	74.24%	79	0.93%	-4,207	-49.41%	8,514
York	10,068	43.66%	12,708	55.11%	284	1.23%	-2,640	-11.45%	23,060
Totals	1,408,818	53.89%	1,175,732	44.98%	29,515	1.13%	233,086	8.92%	2,614,065

Counties and independent cities that flipped from Democratic to Republican

- Caroline (largest town: Bowling Green)
- Covington (independent city)
- Nelson (largest community: Nellysford)

Counties and independent cities that flipped from Republican to Democratic

- Chesterfield (no municipalities)
- Virginia Beach (independent city)
- Winchester (independent city)

=== By congressional district ===
Northam won six of 11 congressional districts, including two that were held by Republicans.

District	Northam	Gillespie	Representative
1st	44.6%	54.2%	Rob Wittman
2nd	51.4%	47.4%	Scott Taylor
3rd	67.9%	30.9%	Bobby Scott
4th	61.6%	37.3%	Donald McEachin
5th	45.1%	53.9%	Tom Garrett
6th	38.5%	60.2%	Bob Goodlatte
7th	47.6%	51.2%	Dave Brat
8th	75.9%	23.1%	Don Beyer
9th	31.2%	67.7%	Morgan Griffith
10th	55.6%	43.3%	Barbara Comstock
11th	69.9%	29.0%	Gerry Connolly

== Exit poll ==
2017 Virginia gubernatorial election voter demographics (CNN)
Demographic subgroup	Northam	Gillespie	% of total vote
Ideology
Liberals	92	6	27
Moderates	64	33	42
Conservatives	9	90	31
Party
Democrats	97	3	41
Republicans	4	95	30
Independents	47	50	28
Donald Trump job approval
Approve	8	91	40
Disapprove	87	11	57
Issue mattered most in your vote
Healthcare	77	23	39
Gun policy	49	49	17
Taxes	31	64	15
Immigration	26	74	12
Gender
Men	48	50	51
Women	61	39	49
Income
$100,000–$200,000	54	45	34
$50,000–$100,000	57	41	33
$30,000–$50,000	57	41	13
Race/ethnicity
White	42	57	67
Black	87	12	20
Latino	67	32	6
White born-again or evangelical Christian
Yes	19	79	26
No	67	31	74
Race by gender
White men	36	63	36
White women	48	51	32
Black men	81	17	9
Black women	91	8	12
All other voters	71	28	6
Age
18–29 years old	69	30	14
30–44 years old	61	37	24
45–64 years old	49	50	42
65 and older	47	53	20
Region
D.C. suburbs	69	30	28
Central Virginia	46	53	17
Hampton Roads	61	37	16
Richmond/Southside	54	44	19
Mountain	34	64	20
Education
College graduate	60	39	58
No college degree	46	52	42
Education by race
White college graduates	51	48	41
Non-white college graduates	80	19	17
Whites without college	26	72	26
Non-whites without college	80	19	16
Education by gender and race
White women with college degrees	58	42	20
White women without college degrees	32	67	11
White men with college degrees	46	54	21
White men without college degrees	22	76	15
Voters of color	80	19	33

== See also ==
- 2017 United States gubernatorial elections
- Governors of Virginia
- 2017 Virginia lieutenant gubernatorial election
- 2017 Virginia Attorney General election
- 2017 Virginia House of Delegates election
