= Mayoral elections in Alexandria, Virginia =

The mayor of Alexandria is elected in November every three years.

The current mayor is Alyia Gaskins. She was elected for her first term in 2024.

== 1996 ==
Incumbent mayor Patsy Ticer was elected to the Virginia Senate in November 1995. A special election was held on February 20, 1996 to fill the vacancy. Democratic council member Kerry Donley was elected.

Alexandria mayoral special election, 1996
Party	Candidate	Votes	%
Democratic	Kerry Donley (inc.)	5,030	88.18
Independent	Charles Severance	490	8.59
Write-ins		184	3.23
Total votes		5,704	100.00
Democratic hold			

== 2000 ==
Incumbent mayor Kerry Donley was reelected to a second term on May 2, 2000, having first been elected in 1996.

Alexandria mayoral election, 2000
Party	Candidate	Votes	%
Democratic	Kerry Donley (inc.)	10,269	60.60
Independent	Robert R. Peavey	6,223	36.72
Independent	Charles Severance	379	2.23
Write-ins		75	0.44
Total votes		16,946	100.00
Democratic hold			

== 2003 ==
Council member Bill Euille was elected to a first term on May 6, 2003.

Alexandria mayoral election, 2003
Party	Candidate	Votes	%
Democratic	Bill Euille	10,427	52.14%
Republican	William C. Cleveland	8,234	41.17
Independent	Townsend A. Van Fleet	1,315	6.58
Write-in	Write-ins	24	0.00
Turnout		20,000	100.00

== 2006 ==
Incumbent mayor Bill Euille won reelection with no opposition candidates on May 2, 2006.

Alexandria mayoral election, 2006
Party	Candidate	Votes	%
Democratic	Bill Euille (incumbent)	12,134	92.53
Write-in	Write-ins	979	7.47
Turnout		13,113	100.00

== 2009 ==
Incumbent mayor Bill Euille won reelection to a third term. No candidates ran against him and he won with 92% of the vote.

Alexandria mayoral election, 2009
Party	Candidate	Votes	%
Democratic	Bill Euille (incumbent)	10.097	92.45
Write-in	Write-ins	825	7.55
Turnout		10,922	

== 2012 ==
Mayoral elections in Alexandria, Virginia
- November 6, 2012
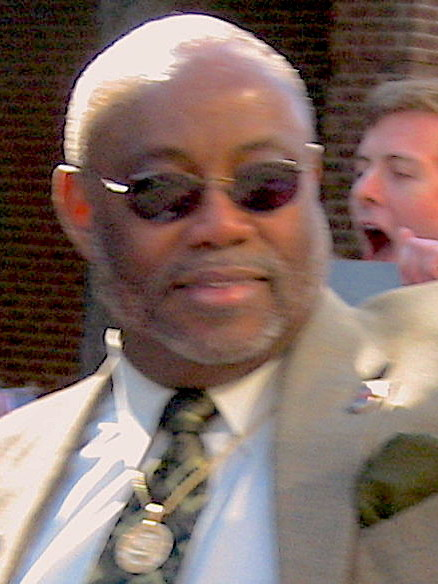
Nominee	Bill Euille	Andrew Macdonald
Party	Democratic	Independent
Popular vote	38,588	26,036
Percentage	59.1%	39.8%
Mayor before election
Bill Euille
Democratic
Elected mayor
Bill Euille
Democratic

The general election for mayor of Alexandria, Virginia, was held on November 6, 2012. Incumbent mayor Bill Euille was reelected to a fourth term.

=== General election ===
Incumbent Mayor Bill Euille faced Andrew Macdonald. Macdonald had served as a Democratic member of the city council between 2003 and 2007 and had run as an independent candidate in 2000. Despite being elected vice mayor by receiving the most votes in the 2006 election, Macdonald resigned from the council in 2007 for personal reasons. In March 2012, Macdonald appeared before the Alexandria Republican Committee and asked for their support in a potential bid for Mayor. Known for his anti-development views, Macdonald said he would make opposition to development on Alexandria's waterfront central to his campaign. Macdonald opposed the project both on environmental grounds while he also charged that Euille had business relationships with current waterfront tenants. Republicans responded favorably to Macdonald's appearance, with Republican Vice Mayor Bill Cleveland saying "I'm voting for anybody but Bill Euille." Several days later, following a confrontation with Alexandria Democratic Committee leadership, Macdonald resigned his membership in the Democratic Committee. On March 9, Macdonald officially announced his run for mayor as an independent.

Though defeated, Macdonald won majorities of the vote in two of the three precincts that bounded on the waterfront area.

Alexandria mayoral election, 2012
Party	Candidate	Votes	%
Democratic	Bill Euille (incumbent)	38,588	59.05
Independent	Andrew Macdonald	26,036	39.84
Write-in	Write-ins	722	1.10
Turnout		65,346	

== 2015 ==
Mayoral elections in Alexandria, Virginia
- November 3, 2015
- Turnout: 31.62%
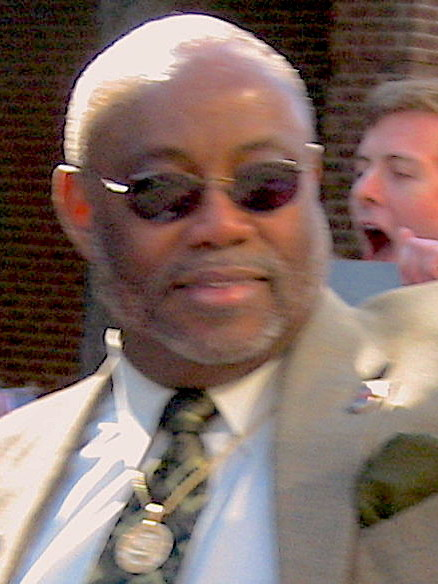
Nominee	Allison Silberberg	Bill Euille
Party	Democratic	Write-in
Popular vote	16,610	9,170
Percentage	63.03%	34.80%
Mayor before election
Bill Euille
Democratic
Elected mayor
Allison Silberberg
Democratic

The general election for mayor of Alexandria, Virginia, was held on November 3, 2015. Allison Silberberg defeated incumbent mayor Bill Euille, who was running as a write-in after being defeated by Silberberg in his attempt to seek renomination in the Democratic primary.

=== Democratic primary ===
The Democratic primary was held on June 9, 2015. Vice-mayor Allison Silberberg, a relative political newcomer, unseated longtime mayor Bill Euille, and also defeated former mayor Kerry J. Donley, in what was regarded to be an upset victory.

Primary results
Party	Candidate	Votes	%
Democratic	Allison Silberberg	5,055	37.57
Democratic	Bill Euille (incumbent)	4,737	35.21
Democratic	Kerry J. Donley	3,662	27.22
Turnout		13,454	16.28

=== General election ===
The general election was held on November 3, 2015. Allison Silberberg defeated incumbent mayor Bill Euille, who ran as a write-in after his defeat in the Democratic primary.

Alexandria mayoral election, 2015
Party	Candidate	Votes	%
Democratic	Allison Silberberg	16,610	63.03
Write-in	Bill Euille (incumbent)	9,170	34.80
Write-in	Other write-ins	573	2.17
Turnout		26,353	31.62

== 2018 ==
Mayoral elections in Alexandria, Virginia
- November 6, 2018
- Turnout: 58.51%
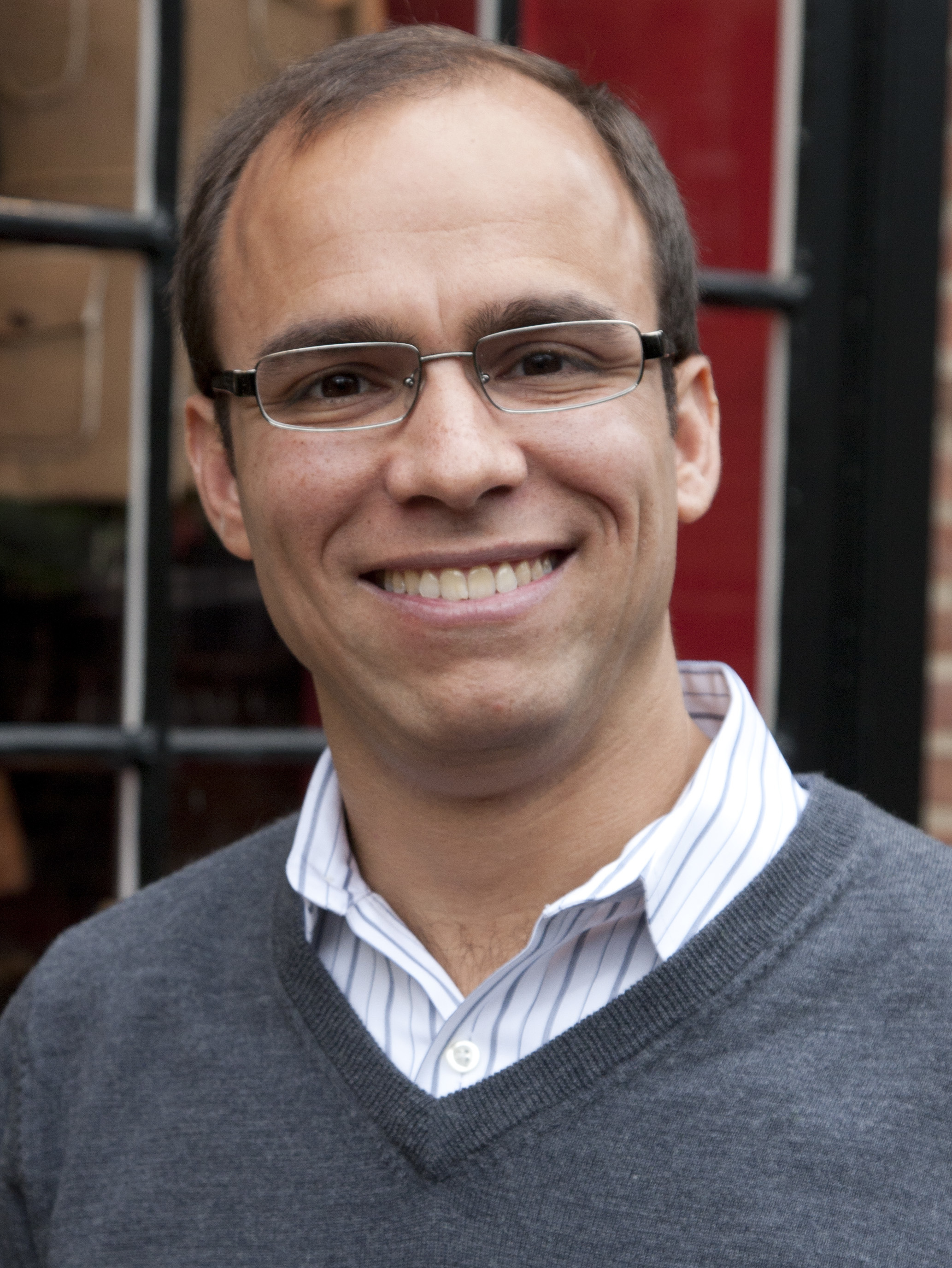
Nominee	Justin Wilson
Party	Democratic
Popular vote	51,750
Percentage	92.72%
Mayor before election
Allison Silberberg
Democratic
Elected mayor
Justin Wilson
Democratic

The general election for mayor of Alexandria, Virginia, was held on November 6, 2018. Justin Wilson was elected as mayor, running unopposed in the general election. Wilson defeated first-term incumbent Allison Silberberg in the Democratic primary.

=== Democratic primary ===
The Democratic primary was held on June 18. Vice-mayor Justin Wilson won the Democratic primary, unseating first-term incumbent Allison Silberberg in what was regarded to be an upset victory.

Primary results
Party	Candidate	Votes	%
Democratic	Justin Wilson	11,451	52.45
Democratic	Allison Silberberg (incumbent)	10,186	46.66
Turnout		21,637	22.91

Map of the Democratic Primary by Precinct Legend: | Wilson 50–60% 60–70% | Silberberg 50–60% 60–70% |

=== General election ===
Wilson was unopposed on the ballot, but write-in votes were cast. Combined voter turnout in Alexandria during the mayoral election and coinciding races was 70.48%, and turnout in the mayoral election alone was 58.51%.

Alexandria mayoral election, 2018
Party	Candidate	Votes	%
Democratic	Justin Wilson	51,750	92.72%
Write-in	Write-ins	4,065	7.28%
Turnout		55,185	58.51

== 2021 ==
2021 Alexandria, Virginia mayoral election

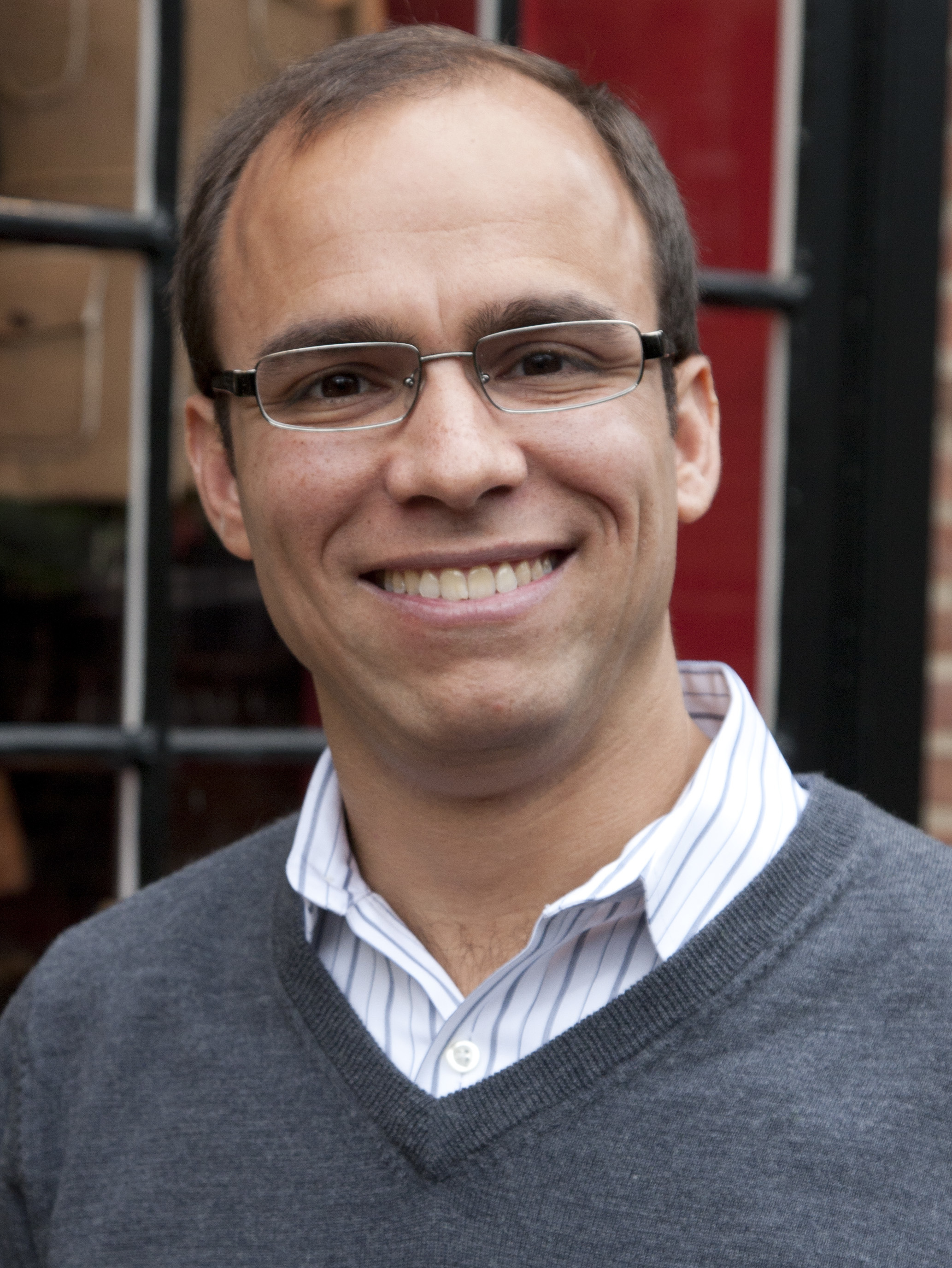

Nominee	Justin Wilson	Annetta Michelle Catchings
Party	Democratic	Republican
Popular vote	36,276	16,584
Percentage	67.7%	30.9%
- Precinct results Wilson: 50-60% 60-70% 70-80%
Mayor before election
Justin Wilson
Democratic
Elected mayor
Justin Wilson
Democratic

The general election for mayor of Alexandria, Virginia, was held on November 2, 2021. Incumbent mayor Justin Wilson was elected to his first term in 2018, having defeated first-term incumbent Allison Silberberg in the Democratic primary. Wilson was challenged by Silberberg in 2021 but defeated her in the primary on June 8. Wilson faced Annetta Catchings, the first Republican to run for Mayor since 1994.

Wilson defeated Catchings in the general election. However, Catchings outperformed gubernatorial nominee Glenn Youngkin in Alexandria by almost 7 points.

=== Democratic primary ===
The Democratic primary was held on June 8, 2021. Incumbent Mayor Justin Wilson defeated his predecessor, Allison Silberberg, in a rematch of the 2018 election.

==== Candidates ====
===== Declared =====
- Allison Silberberg, Mayor of Alexandria (2016−19)
- Justin Wilson, Incumbent mayor (2019−2025)

===== Withdrew =====
- Mo Seifeldein, City councilman (2019−2021)

==== Results ====
Democratic primary results
Party	Candidate	Votes	%
Democratic	Justin Wilson (incumbent)	13,005	57.21
Democratic	Allison Silberberg	9,729	42.79
Turnout		22,734	100.00

Map of the Democratic Primary by Precinct Legend: | Wilson 50–60% 60–70% 70–80% | Silberberg 50–60% 60–70% |

=== Republican nomination ===
The Republican party did not hold a primary. They selected flight attendant Annetta Catchings as their nominee.

=== General election ===
Wilson defeated Republican candidate Catchings in the general election.

Alexandria mayoral election, 2021
Party	Candidate	Votes	%
Democratic	Justin Wilson	36,276	67.7%
Republican	Annetta Michelle Catchings	16,584	30.9%
Turnout		53,615	

== 2024 ==
2024 Alexandria, Virginia mayoral election
- November 5, 2024
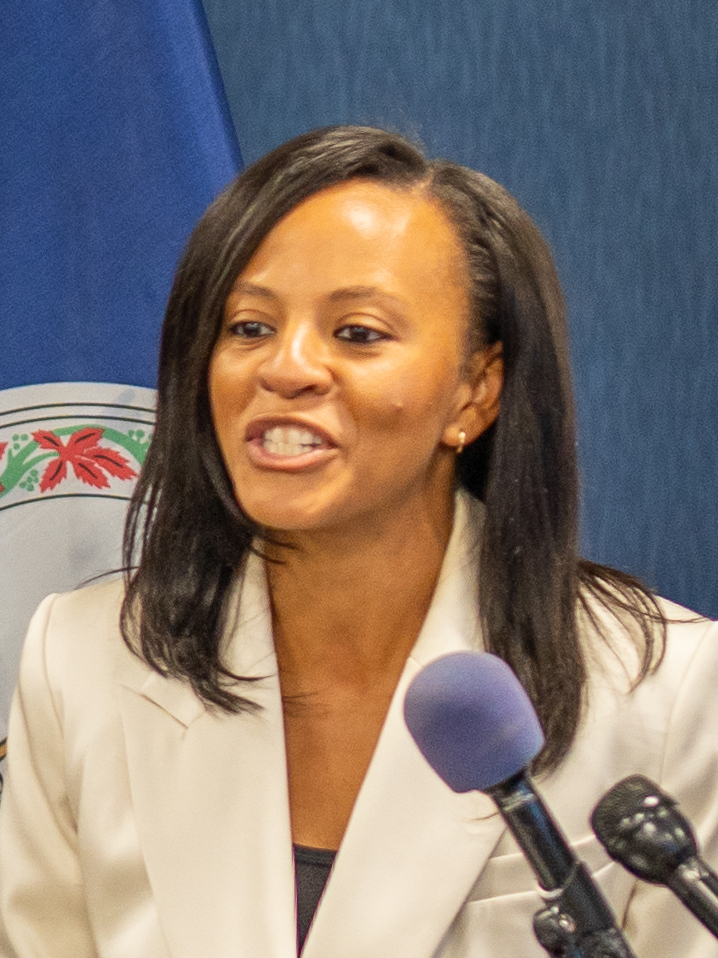
Nominee	Alyia Gaskins
Party	Democratic
Popular vote	61,439
Percentage	93.9%
Mayor before election
Justin Wilson
Democratic
Elected mayor
Alyia Gaskins
Democratic

An election for mayor of Alexandria, Virginia was held on November 5, 2024. Incumbent Justin Wilson announced he would not seek a third term as mayor. He was succeeded by fellow Democrat and city councilor Alyia Gaskins. Gaskins defeated two candidates in the Democratic primary and was unopposed in the general election, which she won with 93.9% of the vote.

=== Democratic primary ===
A Democratic primary was held on June 18, 2024. Incumbent Democratic mayor Justin Wilson did not seek a third term. Wilson was first elected in 2018, defeating incumbent Allison Silberberg in the primary. Wilson was reelected in 2021. In the heavily Democratic Alexandria, the Democratic primary is tantamount to election with the city having not elected a Republican mayor since 1872. Three candidates entered the race to succeed Wilson: councilors Alyia Gaskins and Amy Jackson, as well as real estate developer Steven Peterson. During the election, candidates raised a record amount of money for a mayoral race in Alexandria. Gaskins ultimately won the primary in a landslide.

==== Candidates ====
===== Nominee =====
- Alyia Gaskins, city councilor (2022–present)

===== Eliminated in primary =====
- Amy Jackson, city councilor (2019–present) and vice mayor (2022–present)
- Steven Peterson, real estate developer

===== Declined =====
- Allison Silberberg, former mayor (2016–2019) and candidate for mayor in 2021 (endorsed Jackson)
- Justin Wilson, incumbent mayor (2019–present) (endorsed Gaskins)

==== Endorsements ====
Alyia Gaskins

Local officials

- Sarah Bagley, city councilor
- Willie Bailey, former city councilor
- John Chapman, city councilor
- Bill Euille, former mayor
- Rob Krupicka, former city councilor and state delegate
- Kirk McPike, city councilor
- Jim Moran, former mayor and former Congressman
- Del Pepper, former city councilor
- Justin Wilson, incumbent mayor

Organizations

- Northern Virginia Labor Federation, AFL-CIO
- Run for Something
Amy Jackson

Local officials

- Greg Parks, Alexandria Clerk of Court
- Bryan Porter, Alexandria Commonwealth's Attorney
- Allison Silberberg, former mayor

State legislators

- Dick Saslaw, former Majority Leader of the Virginia Senate
- Holly Seibold, state delegate

County officials

- Andrea Bailey, Prince William County supervisor

==== Polling ====
The Alexandria Democratic Committee held a straw poll on April 14 at Port City Brewing Company. Gaskins won with 117 votes (81%), Jackson received 23 votes (16%), and Peterson received 4 votes (3%).

==== Results ====
Precinct results Gaskins: 40-50% 50-60% 60-70% 70-80% Jackson: 30-40%

2024 Alexandria, Virginia mayoral election, Democratic Primary
Party	Candidate	Votes	%
Democratic	Alyia Gaskins	11,303	59.55%
Democratic	Amy Jackson	5,657	29.80%
Democratic	Steven Peterson	3,662	10.65%
Total votes		18,981	100.00%

=== General election ===
Gaskins was unopposed on the general election ballot and won election with over 90% of the vote.

Alexandria mayoral election, 2024
Party	Candidate	Votes	%
Democratic	Alyia Gaskins	61,439	93.9%
Write-in	Write-ins	3,994	6.1%
Total votes		65,433	100.00%
