= Justin Wilson (politician) =

American politician (born 1979)

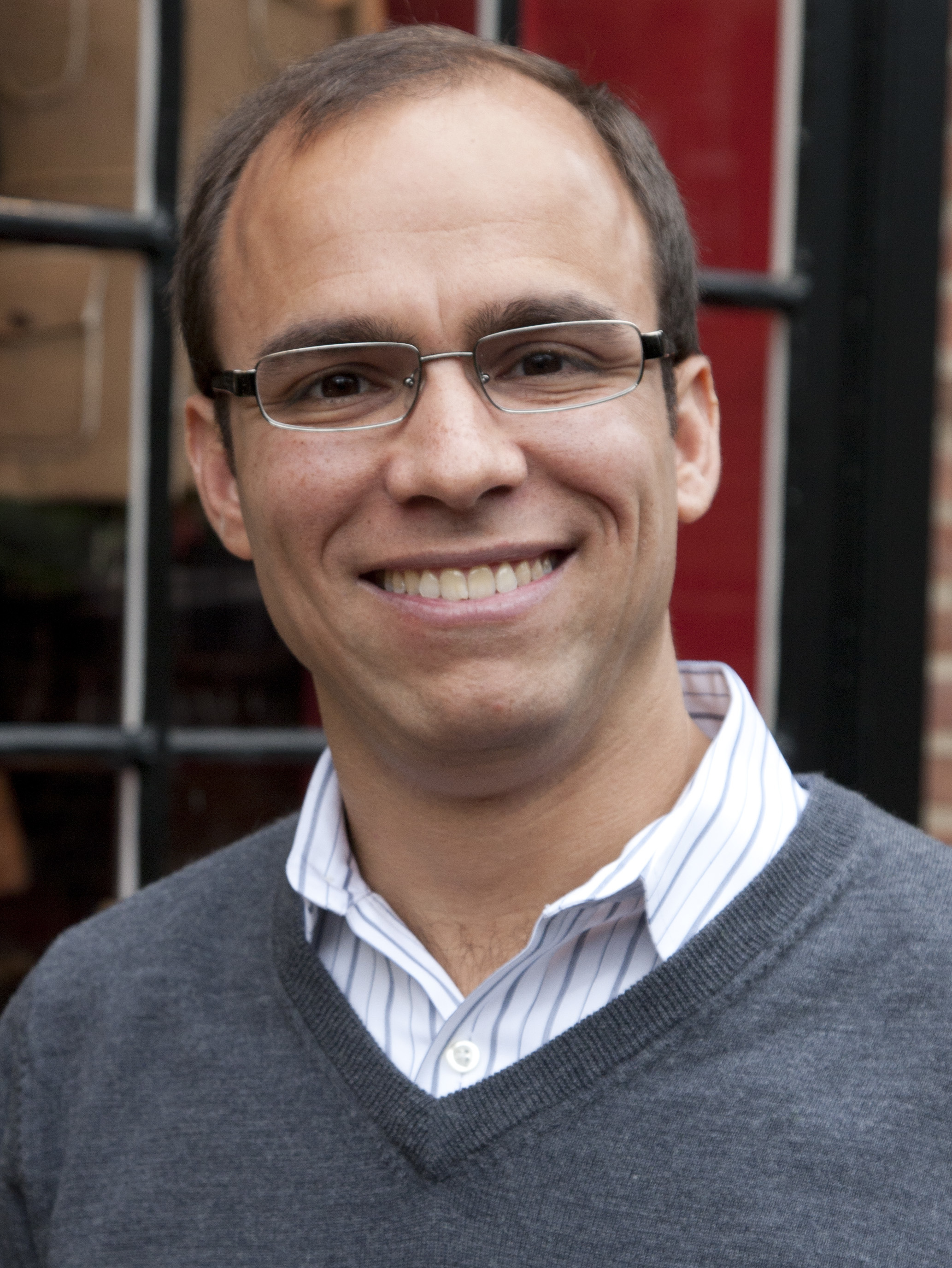
- Wilson in November 2015

Mayor of Alexandria, Virginia
- In office January 2, 2019 – January 2, 2025
- Preceded by: Allison Silberberg
- Succeeded by: Alyia Gaskins

Vice mayor of Alexandria, Virginia
- In office 2016–2019

Member of the Alexandria City Council
- In office 2012–2016
- In office 2007–2009

Personal details
- Born: Justin Marshall Wilson; March 11, 1979 (age 47) Cheverly, Maryland, U.S.
- Party: Democratic
- Spouse: Alex Crawford-Batt
- Children: 2
- Education: Virginia Commonwealth University (BS)

Justin Marshall Wilson (born March 11, 1979) is an American politician who was the mayor of Alexandria, Virginia, from 2019 to 2025. Before that, he served on the Alexandria City Council, including a term as vice mayor from 2016 to 2019. He is a member of the Democratic Party. On December 1, 2023, he announced that he would not seek re-election in 2024.

== Biography ==
Wilson was born in Cheverly, Maryland, to a Caucasian mother and African-American father, and grew up in Washington, D.C., and Fairfax County, Virginia. He graduated from John R. Lewis High School in Springfield, Virginia, when it was named Robert E. Lee High School, and earned a bachelor's from Virginia Commonwealth University. He began in politics in the Virginia Young Democrats and was later a page for Don Beyer during Beyer's tenure as lieutenant governor of Virginia.

Wilson was elected to the Alexandria City Council in 2007 but lost his bid for re-election in 2009. He was elected to the council for a second time in the 2012 election, and was re-elected in 2015. As the council member with the highest vote total in the 2015 election, he served as vice mayor for the following council term.

In the 2018 Democratic mayoral primary, Wilson defeated the incumbent mayor and fellow Democrat Allison Silberberg, by a margin of 52% to 47%. No other candidate qualified for the November general election ballot, so Wilson ran unopposed, although write-in votes were permitted; Wilson received 93% of the votes cast.

In a rematch, Wilson defeated Allison Silberberg in the 2021 Democratic primary, 57% to 43%. Wilson defeated the Republican nominee, Annetta Catchings, in the general election, by a margin of 68% to 31%.

After leaving office as mayor, he was hired as the executive director of NOVA Parks in October 2025. Wilson left his job at Amtrak as a senior director of vendor and contract management, where he had continued to work serving in the Alexandria City government as those positions are part-time.

== Personal life ==
Wilson married Alex Crawford-Batt in 2001, three years after meeting her at a Democratic state convention while in college. They have two children.

== Electoral history ==
=== 2009 ===
2009 Alexandria City Council Election, general election
Party	Candidate	Votes	%
Democratic	Kerry J. Donley	7,713	11.7
Democratic	K. Rob Krupicka	7,707	11.7
Republican	Frank H. Fannon, IV	7,220	11.0
Democratic	Redella Del S. Pepper	7,175	10.9
Democratic	Paul C. Smedberg	7,096	10.8
Independent	Alicia R. Hughes	7,042	10.7
Democratic	Timothy B. Lovain (incumbent)	6,874	10.4
Democratic	Justin M. Wilson (incumbent)	6,735	10.2

=== 2012 ===
2012 Alexandria City Council Election, Democratic Party primary election
Party	Candidate	Votes	%
Democratic	Timothy B. Lovain	5,388	9.1
Democratic	Justin M. Wilson	5,192	8.7
Democratic	Allison Silberberg	5,168	8.7
Democratic	Redella Del S. Pepper (incumbent)	7,175	8.5
Democratic	Paul C. Smedberg (incumbent)	4,957	8.3
Democratic	John Taylor Chapman	4,644	7.8

2012 Alexandria City Council Election, general election
Party	Candidate	Votes	%
Democratic	Allison Silberberg	36,761	12.3
Democratic	Redella S. Pepper (incumbent)	35,197	11.8
Democratic	John Taylor Chapman	33,713	11.3
Democratic	Justin M. Wilson	31,550	10.6
Democratic	Timothy B. Lovain	31,338	10.5
Democratic	Paul C. Smedberg (incumbent)	30,015	10.0

=== 2015 ===
2015 Alexandria City Council Election, general election
Party	Candidate	Votes	%
Democratic	Justin M. Wilson (incumbent)	15,852	11.7
Democratic	John Taylor Chapman (incumbent)	15,437	11.4
Democratic	Paul C. Smedberg (incumbent)	14,914	11.0
Democratic	Redella S. Pepper (incumbent)	14,733	10.8
Democratic	Timothy B. Lovain (incumbent)	14,597	10.7
Democratic	Willie Fitzgerald Bailey, Sr	13,514	10.0

=== 2018 ===
2018 Alexandria, Virginia, mayoral election, Democratic Party primary election
Party	Candidate	Votes	%
Democratic	Justin M. Wilson	11,451	53.0
Democratic	Allison Silberberg (incumbent)	10,186	47.1

2018 Alexandria, Virginia, mayoral election
Party	Candidate	Votes	%
Democratic	Justin M. Wilson	51,750	92.4
Write-in		4,066	7.3

=== 2021 ===
2021 Alexandria, Virginia, mayoral election, Democratic Party primary election
Party	Candidate	Votes	%
Democratic	Justin M. Wilson (incumbent)	13,176	57.2
Democratic	Allison Silberberg	9,857	42.8

2021 Alexandria, Virginia, mayoral election
Party	Candidate	Votes	%
Democratic	Justin M. Wilson (incumbent)	36,276	67.7
Republican	Annetta Michelle Catchings	16,584	30.9
