= Charles Severance =

Charles Severance may refer to:

- Charles Severance (computer scientist)
- Charles Severance (serial killer)
