= Alyia Gaskins =

American politician (born 1989)

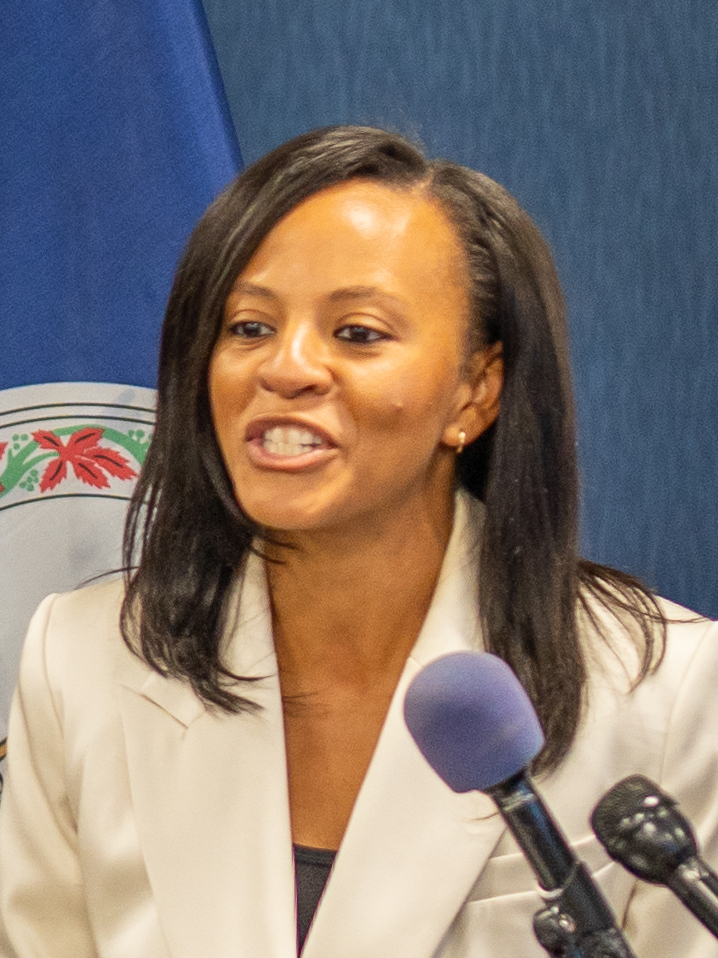
- Gaskins in 2025

Mayor of Alexandria, Virginia
- Incumbent
- Assumed office January 2, 2025
- Preceded by: Justin Wilson

Member of the Alexandria City Council
- In office 2022–2025

Personal details
- Born: May 1, 1989 (age 37)
- Party: Democratic
- Children: 2
- Education: Vanderbilt University; University of Pittsburgh; Georgetown University

Alyia Gaskins (born May 1, 1989) is an American public health professional, urban planner, and politician serving as the mayor of Alexandria, Virginia. She assumed office as Alexandria's first black female mayor in January 2025, having served on the City Council from 2022 to 2025.

== Early life and education ==
Gaskins was born May 1, 1989. She was raised in Pittsburgh by her mother and grandmother. Her mother experienced health issues, including diabetes, sarcoidosis, and asthma, which led to frequent hospitalizations and financial strain on the family. Growing up in a household where her mother prioritized health insurance over other essentials, Gaskins encountered challenges such as a mold- and rodent-infested home, which influenced her early aspirations toward healthcare. In sixth grade, Gaskins received a scholarship that enabled her to attend an all-girls private school, which her mother's income could not have otherwise afforded.

Gaskins pursued higher education at Vanderbilt University, earning a degree in medicine, health, and society. She subsequently obtained a M.P.H. from the University of Pittsburgh Graduate School of Public Health and a Master's in Urban Planning from the Georgetown University School of Continuing Studies. Gaskins also completed a professional certificate in municipal finance from the University of Chicago.

== Career ==
Gaskins began her career working on hunger policy at D.C. Hunger Solutions and later joined the National League of Cities as part of the health team. While there, she started a learning collaborative on health disparities, working with over 20 cities. Gaskins also managed the Let's Move! Cities, Towns and Counties program, an initiative promoting healthy eating and active living, where she coordinated with federal agencies and local governments to implement health-related policies across over 500 cities.

Gaskins held leadership positions in various Alexandria and Virginia boards, including the Virginia Transportation Commission and Virginia Fair Housing Board. In 2019, she founded CitiesRX, a consulting firm specializing in cross-sector partnerships with cities to foster healthy, sustainable environments. She later worked as a senior program officer at the Melville Charitable Trust, focusing on philanthropy to address issues related to housing and community health.

Gaskins entered local politics in 2021, successfully campaigning for a seat on the Alexandria City Council, where she was elected to serve a three-year term beginning in 2022. Her platform emphasized public health, infrastructure, affordable housing, and economic support for small businesses. As a council member, she was involved in initiatives to address Alexandria's infrastructure challenges, including investments in stormwater management to alleviate flooding issues in Old Town Alexandria.

During the 2024 Alexandria, Virginia mayoral election Gaskins won the Democratic primary, a position she ran for unopposed in the November general election. She was sworn in as Alexandria's first Black female mayor on January 2, 2025.

== Personal life ==
Gaskins resides in Alexandria's West End with her husband, Greg, and their two children. As a mother to a two-year-old and a four-year-old, she has spoken about the importance of balancing her family responsibilities with her career. Her family also includes a beagle, Riley, who has frequently accompanied her to public events.

== Electoral history ==
2024 Alexandria, Virginia mayoral election, Democratic Primary
Party	Candidate	Votes	%
Democratic	Alyia Gaskins	11,303	59.55%
Democratic	Amy Jackson	5,657	29.80%
Democratic	Steven Peterson	3,662	10.65%
Total votes		18,981	100.00%
