= Rob Krupicka =

Virginia politician

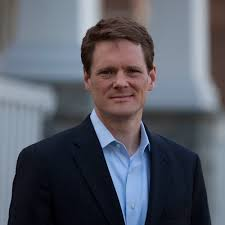

Member of the Virginia House of Delegates from the 45th district
- In office September 28, 2012 – January 13, 2016
- Preceded by: David L. Englin
- Succeeded by: Mark Levine

Personal details
- Born: Kenneth Robert Krupicka, Jr. February 18, 1971 (age 55) Thousand Oaks, California
- Party: Democratic
- Children: Janelle and Gillian
- Education: University of Virginia, (B.A.) economics
- Occupation: Communications and business strategy consultant
- Website: www.krupicka.com

Kenneth Robert "Rob" Krupicka, Jr. (born February 18, 1971) is presently a children and family therapist working in Virginia. He is a former American politician. A Democrat, he served on the Alexandria, Virginia city council from 2003–2012, the Virginia State Board of Education from 2009–2012 and, in the Virginia House of Delegates from 2012 to 2016.

== Early life ==
Krupicka was born in Thousand Oaks, California on February 18, 1971.

Krupicka graduated from the University of Virginia with a degree in economics, and subsequently moved to Alexandria where he met his then wife Lisa Guernsey. Along with their two daughters, Janelle and Gillian, they lived in Alexandria’s Del Ray neighborhood.

== Political career ==
Krupicka began his civic life as president of the Del Ray Citizens Association, and at the urging of the community he successfully ran for City Council in 2003. During his nine years on Council, he worked to expand mass transit throughout the city (including leading on the creation of the planned Potomac Yard Metro); advocated for policies that have increased recycling; instituted policies that encourage people to walk or bike to work; fought for the acquisition of acres of new open space; successfully pushed to expand pre-k services in the city; promoted expanded community policing and gang prevention effortsand co-founded the Eco-City Alexandria program that has made Alexandria a recognized leader in energy conservation and sustainability.

In 2009, after helping to create Virginia's school readiness standards, Governor Tim Kaine appointed Krupicka to the State Board of Education where he worked to expand educational opportunity in Virginia's schools and ensure that children in the Commonwealth show up to Kindergarten ready to learn and graduate High School with the skills necessary to compete in the 21st Century economy. On the Board, Krupicka was a strong advocate for increasing math and science learning opportunities in Virginia as well as for distancing Virginia from No Child Left Behind Act.

In 2011, Krupicka contested the Democratic nomination for the Virginia 30th Senate district, which was an open seat due to the retirement of Senator Patsy Ticer. Krupicka ran second to the eventual winner, Adam Ebbin.

In 2012, after the previous delegate for the House of Delegates 45th district resigned, Krupicka announced his candidacy and received the Democratic nomination by winning a primary in August. Governor Bob McDonnell called a special election for September 4, 2012, and Krupicka was elected over Republican and Libertarian candidates.

He sat on the following committees: Privileges and Elections; Counties, Cities and Towns; and Health, Welfare, and Institutions.

In the General Assembly Krupicka focused on education issues. In the 2014 session, he worked to successfully pass significant SOL reform legislation, which received almost unanimous bipartisan support in both the House and Senate. In 2013 the Virginia Education Association named them their Rookie of the Year.

Criminal justice and mental health were also legislative priorities for Krupicka. During his first year, he successfully argued for increased funding in the budget for Mental Health First Aid Training.

== Post-political Career ==
Krupicka left politics in 2015 to pursue his career as a small businessman, operating Sugar Shack Donuts in Alexandria. The store was re-branded as Elizabeth's Counter, a vegan cafe and bakery, in February 2020. Elizabeth's Counter closed in August 2022 and was replaced by Railbird Kitchen, also owned and operated by Krupicka. Krupicka received his MSW from George Mason University in 2024 and began work as a therapist at River Grove Therapy in Old Town Alexandria in the fall of 2024.

He presently resides in Old Town Alexandria, VA.

== Electoral history ==
Date	Election	Candidate	Party	Votes	%
Senate of Virginia, 30th district
August 23, 2011	Democratic primary	Adam P. Ebbin		4,570	38.77
August 23, 2011	Democratic primary	K. Rob Krupicka		4,235	35.93
August 23, 2011	Democratic primary	Libby Garvey		2,980	25.28
Virginia House of Delegates, 45th district
September 4, 2012	Special	K. Rob Krupicka	Democratic	6,388	75.73
September 4, 2012	Special	Timothy T. C. McGhee	Republican	1,729	20.49
September 4, 2012	Special	Justin R. Malkin	Libertarian	289	3.42
September 4, 2012	Special	Write Ins		29	0.34
September 4, 2012	Special	David L. Englin resigned; seat remained Democratic			

== Awards ==
2014 Virginia Chamber of Commerce’s Excellence in Education and Workforce Development

2013 Accepted into University of Virginia Darden School's Emerging Leaders Program of the State Legislative Leaders Foundation

2013 Virginia Education Association Rookie of the Year

2007 Virginia Jaycees Young Virginian of the Year

2006 Elizabeth Ann Campagna Award for support of children and families

2006 Bike Walk Virginia State Legislative Award

2004-2005 Virginia Natural Resources Leadership Institute Fellow (through the University of Virginia and Virginia Tech)
