= Allison Silberberg =

American politician (born 1963)

Mayor of Alexandria, Virginia
- In office January 4, 2016 – January 2, 2019
- Preceded by: Bill Euille
- Succeeded by: Justin Wilson

Personal details
- Born: 1963 (age 62–63) Dallas, Texas, U.S.
- Party: Democratic
- Education: American University; University of California

Allison Silberberg (born 1963) is an American writer and politician. A Democrat, she served as the mayor of Alexandria, Virginia from January 4, 2016 to January 2, 2019.

== Biography ==
Silberberg was born in Dallas, Texas, to Alfred "Al" H. Silberberg, a petroleum engineer, and Barbara Arden Schwartz Silberberg, a community stateswoman and local Democratic Party activist. Silberberg received a bachelor's degree in international relations and history from American University in Washington, DC, and a master's degree in fine arts in playwriting from the School of Theater, Film and Television at the University of California, Los Angeles. She is Jewish.

Silberberg is the author of “Visionaries in Our Midst,” a book that profiles individuals making a difference in the United States. She is also the author of “And Life Will Be a Beautiful Dream,” a commissioned memoir about the meaningful life of a philanthropic family. She wrote an episode for the situation comedy Mama's Family, titled "Mama's Layaway Plan." It debuted on February 11, 1989. She has also written columns and articles for PBS, The Washington Post'', and The Dallas Morning News.

Silberberg has over 25 years of experience in community leadership and public service, including interning for Senator Ted Kennedy and working for Senator Lloyd Bentsen. She served a three-year term on the World Bank's Community Outreach Grants Committee, which disbursed major funding to local nonprofits in Washington. She started and led a nonprofit called Lights, Camera, Action!, which used film to mentor youth in Anacostia. For nearly a decade, Silberberg hosted monthly charitable events, which gave all proceeds to local nonprofits focused on children at risk and families in distress.

Silberberg has lived in Alexandria since 1989. From 2004 to 2012, she served on Alexandria's Economic Opportunities Commission (EOC), which advocates for the city's most vulnerable residents. As chair of the EOC, she initiated the EOC's annual public service day, “All Hands on Deck.” The first annual “All Hands on Deck” renovated the Alexandria Community Shelter with the help of 100 volunteers. Silberberg won New Hope Housing's 2012 Leadership/Servanthood award for her role in leading the “All Hands on Deck” project.

== Political career ==
In 2012, she was elected to the Alexandria City Council. Because she won the most votes of all the candidates, she became the city's Vice Mayor. In the 2015 mayoral election, Silberberg ran for mayoral office, defeating incumbent Mayor William D. Euille, Alexandria's first African American mayor, in the Democratic primary. Euille then ran against Silberberg as a write-in candidate, garnering 34% of the vote but ultimately losing to Silberberg.

=== Mayor of Alexandria (2016-2018) ===
Silberberg was sworn in on January 4, 2016. During her tenure as mayor, Alexandria tripled the dedicated funding for affordable housing, addressed the issues with multiple sewage outfalls into the Potomac River, and built two new public schools in the West End neighborhood of Alexandria.

Silberberg was defeated in her bid for re-election by Alexandria Vice Mayor Justin Wilson on June 12, 2018, in Alexandria's Democratic mayoral primary.

=== Re-election bid (2021) ===
On March 24, 2021 Silberberg announced that she was running for mayor against Justin Wilson, the incumbent. She ran on a platform of responsible development, environmental protection of Alexandria's forests, and repairing sewage and stormwater infrastructure.

The Democratic primary in Virginia was held on June 8; Silberberg received 43% of the vote, losing to Wilson.
