= Del Pepper =

American politician (born 1937/38)

Redella S. "Del" Pepper (born 1937 or 1938) is an American politician who served on the Alexandria, Virginia city council from 1985 until the beginning of 2022 and vice mayor (most votes among council members) 1996 to 1997 and 2003 to 2009. She announced in 2020 that she was not running for reelection in 2021 and was the oldest and longest-serving member of the city council when she left office after 36 years.

== Career ==
Pepper served as an aide to mayor Charles E. Beatley before winning her first term as a council member in 1985. As his aide, she worked on the creation of DASH bus system, which launched in 1984 and continues to run regular service in the city. As a member of the city council, she was generally seen as a populist, well-connected with residents, and skeptical about new development. Later in her career she softened that stance and voted in support of a number of large-scale and high-profile development plans even as she remained vocally skeptical of them.

In 1987, she was quoted as saying "[i]f I had to talk about the most unusual person I know, I'd talk about Vola" about new city manager (and first woman to service that position) Vola Lawson. In 1988, Pepper vocally supported a measure that "bars discrimination against any municipal employee who contracts, AIDS becoming the first local government in the Washington area to guarantee the jobs of AIDS victims formally", with Pepper quoted as saying "It's fair. It's compassionate."

In 2003, she reclaimed the title of vice mayor in the election when William D. Euille became the first Black mayor of Alexandria.

In 2006, Pepper expressed "outrage and disbelief" that the EPA allowed the then-Mirant (now GenOn Energy) coal-fired power plant in Alexandria to increase output. She was co-chair of the city's monitoring group and one of the more vocal advocate for its closure. In 2012, the plant was finally closed and Pepper said in celebration: "[t]his is really a time for celebration .... his was the region's biggest polluter".

In 2018, she reflected on her previous years of service and wanted to highlight programs such as the Eco-City Charter that she helped instigate the city's Eco-City Charter, which was the first one in Virginia.

On June 23, 2020 she was honored for her 35 years of service on the council and the council adopted a resolution honoring. Senator Mark Warner, Congress member Don Beyer, State Senator Adam Ebbin, and State Delegate Charniele Herring were among the political officials who spoke during the virtual city council meeting.

On January 27, 2021, the Virginia House of Delegates, with the Senate of Virginia concurring, passed a resolution commending Pepper for her career.

She has remained on the council through the 2021 elections, where she is not running for re-election. She has been the vice mayor several times (who in Alexandria is the at-large council member who received the most votes in the general election), 1996 to 1997, from 2003 to 2006, and from 2007 to 2009. She is the former president of the Metropolitan Washington Council of Governments and currently is on their Air Quality Committee and Board of Directors.

== Retirement ==
On January 1, 2022, she formally retired from the city council. At 36 years on the council, she was "the oldest and longest-serving member of the body" and "is believed to be the longest-serving local elected official in the region" according to executive director of the Northern Virginia Regional Commission.

== Personal life ==
Pepper was born in Omaha, Nebraska before attending Grinnell College for undergraduate and then graduate school at the University of Wisconsin. Her father was an Omaha City Council member and he later ran a regional Democratic office around Lyndon B. Johnson presidential campaign. She moved to Chicago and worked as a social worker for five years before moving to Alexandria in 1968, where she lives with her husband F. J. Pepper, a psychiatrist, in the West End. They have a son.
