= Charles Severance (serial killer) =

American serial killer (born 1960)

- Born: Charles Stanard Severance; September 25, 1960 (age 66); Fairfax County, Virginia, U.S.
- Education: University of Virginia (BSME)
- Political party: Independent
- Convictions: Capital murder (2 counts); First degree murder Malicious wounding Use of a firearm in the commission of a felony (4 counts); Possession of a firearm by a convicted felon (2 counts)
- Penalty: Life imprisonment without parole

Details
- Victims: 3
- Span of crimes: 2003–2014
- Country: United States
- State: Virginia
- Date apprehended: March 13, 2014

Charles Stanard Severance (born September 25, 1960) is a convicted American serial killer whose crimes took place in Alexandria, Virginia, between 2003 and 2014. He was convicted by a Virginia court in 2016 of three shooting deaths and sentenced to life in prison plus an additional 48 years.

== Trials ==
He was tried for the killings of three individuals: Ruthanne Lodato in 2014, Ronald Kirby in 2013, and Nancy Dunning in 2003. The case received considerable attention in the city because Severance (as convicted) attacked in broad daylight by knocking on victim's doors and killing those who answered with a .22 caliber firearm, with investigators eventually finding writings from Severance titled "Knock. Talk. Enter. Kill. Exit. Murder."

Severance was ultimately arrested on March 13, 2014, following the release of a police sketch taken after the shooting of Lodato. Prosecutors alleged he did so out of hatred for elites in the generally wealthy city of Alexandria.

In December 2016, Severance was granted leave by a judge to appeal his convictions on three counts of law. However, six months later, on May 23, 2017, a three-judge panel of the Court of Appeals of Virginia ruled unanimously to uphold the 2015 convictions.

== Political career ==
Prior to the killings, Severance ran unsuccessfully for Mayor of Alexandria in a 1996 special election and 2000 as well as for Congress for the 8th district in 1996. On the campaign trail, Severance displayed unusual and erratic behavior. Severance appeared at campaign events dressed entirely in black with a cloak and sunglasses and during Severance's campaigns for Mayor, the city manager and police chief assigned an undercover officer to follow Democratic candidate and eventual mayor Kerry Donley. On several occasions during his campaigns, Severance became violent. In one instance during a forum in 1996, Severance picked up an American flag and pointed the spiked finial at Representative Jim Moran before running out of the building. At another forum in 2000, Severance punched one of the organizers.

The focus of Severance's campaigns were juvenile mental health and psychotropic drug prescriptions. During his runs for mayor, Severance responded to nearly every question by transitioning to talk about these topics. In a statement in 2000, Severance said a "plague of child and adolescent psychiatry" threatened to overwhelm Alexandria. He went on to say "Terrorism, child exploitation and adolescent abuse by child and adolescent psychiatrists who peddle dope for profit under the guise of academia and clinical practice must be eradicated."

=== Electoral history ===
Alexandria mayoral special election, 1996
Party	Candidate	Votes	%
	Kerry Donley (inc.)	5,030	88.18
	Charles Severance	490	8.59
{{{party}}}		184	3.23
Total votes		5,704	100.00
Democratic hold			

Virginia's 8th congressional district election, 1996
Party	Candidate	Votes	%
	Jim Moran (inc.)	152,334	66.40
	John Otey	64,562	28.14
	R. Ward Edmonds	6,243	2.72
	Sarina Grosswald	5,239	2.28
	Charles Severance	740	0.32
{{{party}}}		303	0.13
Total votes		229,421	100.00
Democratic hold			

Alexandria mayoral election, 2000
Party	Candidate	Votes	%
	Kerry Donley (inc.)	16,939	60.62
	Robert R. Peavey	6,223	36.74
	Charles Severance	379	2.24
{{{party}}}		68	0.40
Total votes		16,939	100.00
Democratic hold			

== See also ==
- List of serial killers in the United States
