= Adam Ebbin =

American politician from Virginia (born 1963)

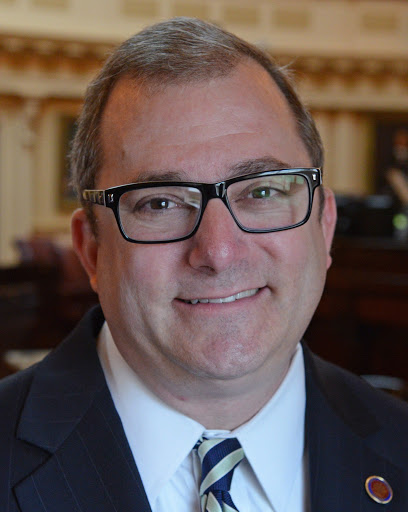
- Ebbin in 2015

Member of the Virginia Senate
- In office January 11, 2012 – February 17, 2026
- Preceded by: Patsy Ticer
- Succeeded by: Elizabeth Bennett-Parker
- Constituency: 30th District (2012–2024); 39th District (2024–2026)

Member of the Virginia House of Delegates from the 49th district
- In office January 14, 2004 – January 11, 2012
- Preceded by: Karen Darner
- Succeeded by: Alfonso Lopez

Personal details
- Born: Adam Paul Ebbin; November 10, 1963 (age 62) Huntington, New York, U.S.
- Party: Democratic
- Education: American University
- Occupation: Marketing consultant
- Committees: Commerce and Labor; Finance and Appropriations; General Laws and Technology; Chair; Privileges and Elections; Transportation; Rules
- Website: adamebbin.com

Adam Paul Ebbin (born November 10, 1963) is an American politician who served as the state senator from the 39th District of the Virginia Senate since from 2024 until his resignation in 2026. A member of the Democratic Party, he previously represented the 30th Senate District from 2012 to 2024 and served in the Virginia House of Delegates from the 49th District from 2004 to 2012. In January 2026, Ebbin announced he intended to resign his seat to take up a position as senior advisor with the Virginia Cannabis Control Authority.

As an openly gay man, Ebbin has made history several times through his electoral success. In 2003, he became the first out LGBT person elected to the Virginia House of Delegates and the Virginia General Assembly. In 2011 he became the first out LGBT person elected to the Virginia Senate.

Ebbin was one of four LGBT people serving in the Virginia General Assembly (alongside Mark Sickles, Dawn Adams, and Danica Roem).

== Early life ==
A 1985 graduate of the American University in Washington, D.C., Ebbin was a Fellow at the University of Virginia's Sorensen Institute of Political Leadership in 2000. A longtime Democratic Party activist, Ebbin spent a decade on the party's state central committee and was a delegate to both the 2000 and 2004 Democratic national conventions. In 2012, Ebbin completed Harvard University's John F. Kennedy School of Government program for Senior Executives in State and Local Government as a David Bohnett LGBTQ Victory Institute Leadership Fellow.

During the 2000 presidential election, Ebbin was a Virginia state co-chair of GoreNet. GoreNet was a group that supported the Al Gore campaign with a focus on grassroots and online organizing as well as hosting small dollar donor events.

== House of Delegates ==
He first sought the 49th district seat in 2003, narrowly winning a five-person Democratic primary and facing no Republican opponent in the general election. He took office in January 2004 and was re-elected unopposed in 2005. Ebbin faced only an Independent Green opponent in 2007, winning easily, and ran unopposed in 2009. The district includes a large part of South Arlington, the Del Ray and Arlandria areas of the City of Alexandria and parts of Bailey's Crossroads in Fairfax County.

== State Senate ==
Ebbin decided to give up his seat in the House of Delegates to run for the Virginia State Senate in 2011, following Patsy Ticer's announcement that she would not seek re-election. He ran in the 30th district, comprising parts of Arlington, Alexandria and Fairfax County; the district leans heavily Democratic.

He faced a heated Democratic primary election held on August 23, 2011, with two opponents: Rob Krupicka, a member of the Alexandria city council, and Libby Garvey, a member of the Arlington school board. Krupicka, who led in fundraising, was widely considered the favorite but Ebbin prevailed narrowly in what local newspapers called an "upset" and a "shocker". Ebbin took 39% of the vote to Krupicka's 36% and Garvey's 25% – a margin of 335 votes. The 30th district race was the second most expensive primary in the state, with the three Democratic candidates raising a combined $746,000. In the general election, Ebbin faced Republican candidate Tim McGhee and prevailed easily. He took office as a Virginia state senator on January 11, 2012.

Ebbin served on five Senate committees: Finance and Appropriations; Commerce and Labor; Privileges & Elections; General Laws and Technology; and the Transportation Committee. He serves on a number of Commissions and interim Committees including the Task Force to Commemorate the Centennial Anniversary of Women's Right to Vote, the Joint Commission on Administrative Rules, the Northern Virginia Transportation Commission, and the Joint Subcommittee to Evaluate Taxation Preferences. Adam also serves as the Vice-Chairman of the Joint Commission on Technology and Science and as the Co-Chair of the General Assembly Gun Violence Prevention Caucus.

During the 2020 Legislative Session Adam passed legislation including: The Virginia Values Act, a landmark bill to provide nondiscrimination protections in housing, employment, and public accommodations for LGBT Virginians. He also passed legislation to decriminalize marijuana, allow localities to institute fees on throw away bags, and create a legal avenue for employees to sue their employers for wage theft. In 2021, Ebbin passed legislation legalizing the simple possession of cannabis and was appointed Chair of the General Assembly Cannabis Oversight Commission, which oversees the structuring of the proposed legal market for adult use cannabis in Virginia.

During the 2022 legislative session, Ebbin was elected Chair of the Senate Privileges and Elections Committee, becoming the second out LGBT official to serve as a General Assembly Committee Chair.

== 2014 Congressional Campaign ==
On January 30, 2014, Ebbin announced his candidacy in the Democratic primary for the 8th Congressional district seat being vacated by Congressman Jim Moran. The 8th Congressional District is Virginia's most Democratic district, with a Cook Partisan Voting Index of D+21, and one of the most Democratic white-majority districts in the South. The heavily contested Democratic primary drew a number of challengers, including former Lt. Governor Don Beyer, State Delegate Patrick Hope, former Northern Virginia Urban League Chief Lavern Chatman, mayor of Alexandria William D. Euille, radio-talk show host Mark Levine, and Virginia Tech professor Derek Hyra. Ebbin finished third in the June 10, 2014 Democratic primary with 6,262 votes, while Beyer won the primary with 17,783 votes. Beyer went on to win the general election on November 7, 2014.

== Virginia Cannabis Control Authority ==
On January 7, 2026, Ebbin announced he intended to resign his state senate seat to take up a role in the administration of incoming governor Abigail Spanberger as a senior advisor to the Virginia Cannabis Control Authority. Ebbin's resignation from the Senate became effective as of February 17, 2026. He was succeeded by fellow Democrat Elizabeth Bennett-Parker.

== Personal life ==
A former president of the Virginia Partisans Gay & Lesbian Democratic Club, Ebbin was the third openly gay elected official in Virginia and the first ever openly gay member of the Virginia General Assembly. His campaigns have won the backing of the Gay & Lesbian Victory Fund. He was previously employed by the Servicemembers Legal Defense Network as its Director of Communications.

== Electoral history ==
Virginia's 49th House of Delegates district Democratic primary results, 2003
Party	Candidate	Votes	%
Democratic	Adam Ebbin	771	29.7
Democratic	Teresa Martinez	728	28.0
Democratic	Andres Tobar	695	26.7
Democratic	Michael Graham	273	10.5
Democratic	Nathan Monell	133	5.1
Total votes		2,600	100.0

Virginia's 49th House of Delegates district general election results, 2003
Party	Candidate	Votes	%
Democratic	Adam Ebbin	4,383	96.6
n/a	Write-ins	154	3.4
Total votes		4,537	100.0
Democratic hold			

Virginia's 49th House of Delegates district general election results, 2005
Party	Candidate	Votes	%
Democratic	Adam Ebbin	9,215	97.6
n/a	Write-ins	228	2.4
Total votes		9,443	100.0
Democratic hold			

Virginia's 49th House of Delegates district general election results, 2007
Party	Candidate	Votes	%
Democratic	Adam Ebbin	4,468	79.7
Independent	James Fisher	1,072	19.1
n/a	Write-ins	66	1.2
Total votes		5,606	100.0
Democratic hold			

Virginia's 49th House of Delegates district general election results, 2009
Party	Candidate	Votes	%
Democratic	Adam Ebbin	8,890	95.7
n/a	Write-ins	395	4.3
Total votes		9,285	100.0
Democratic hold			

Virginia's 30th Senate district Democratic primary results, 2011
Party	Candidate	Votes	%
Democratic	Adam Ebbin	4,570	38.8
Democratic	Rob Krupicka	4,235	35.9
Democratic	Libby Garvey	2,980	25.3
n/a	Write-ins	6	0.1
Total votes		11,791	100.0

Virginia's 30th Senate district general election results, 2011
Party	Candidate	Votes	%
Democratic	Adam Ebbin	20,968	64.7
Republican	Timothy McGhee	11,349	35.0
n/a	Write-ins	102	0.3
Total votes		32,419	100.0

Virginia's 8th congressional district Democratic primary results, 2014
Party	Candidate	Votes	%
Democratic	Don Beyer	17,783	45.8
Democratic	Patrick Hope	7,095	18.3
Democratic	Adam Ebbin	5,262	13.5
Democratic	William Euille	3,264	8.4
Democratic	Mark Levine	2,613	6.7
Democratic	Lavern Chatman	2,117	5.4
Democratic	Derek Hyra	479	1.2
Democratic	Charniele Herring	126	0.3
Democratic	Bruce Shuttleworth	83	0.2
Democratic	Satish Korpe	42	0.1
n/a	Write-ins	4	0.0
Total votes		38,868	100.0

Virginia's 30th Senate district general election results, 2015
Party	Candidate	Votes	%
Democratic	Adam Ebbin	27,274	76.7
Independent Greens	James Fisher	7,431	20.9
n/a	Write-ins	842	2.4
Total votes		35,547	100.0

Virginia's 30th Senate district general election results, 2019
Party	Candidate	Votes	%
Democratic	Adam Ebbin	42,850	91.7
n/a	Write-ins	3,895	8.3
Total votes		46,745	100.0

Virginia House of Delegates
Preceded by Karen Darner	Member of the Virginia House of Delegates from the 49th district 2004–2012	Succeeded by Alfonso Lopez
Senate of Virginia
Preceded by Patsy Ticer	Member of the Virginia Senate from the 30th district 2012–2024	Succeeded by Danica Roem
Preceded by George Barker	Member of the Virginia Senate from the 39th district 2024–2026	Succeeded by Elizabeth Bennett-Parker
