= Kerry J. Donley =

American politician (1956–2022)

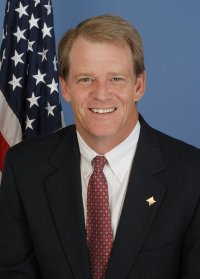

Chair of the Democratic Party of Virginia
- In office November 15, 2003 – June 18, 2005
- Preceded by: Larry Framme
- Succeeded by: Richard Cranwell

Mayor of Alexandria, Virginia
- In office February 27, 1996 – July 1, 2003
- Preceded by: Patsy Ticer
- Succeeded by: Bill Euille

Personal details
- Born: Kerry Joseph Donley; February 1, 1956 Elk Point, South Dakota, U.S.
- Died: July 13, 2022 (aged 66) Alexandria, Virginia, U.S.
- Party: Democratic
- Spouse: Eva Shamblin
- Children: 5
- Education: Marquette University

Kerry Joseph Donley (February 1, 1956 – July 13, 2022) was an American banker and politician who was a Democratic member of the Alexandria, Virginia City Council and previously served as Mayor of Alexandria from 1996–2003 and as Chairman of the Democratic Party of Virginia from 2003–2005.

== Background ==
At the age of 7, Donley and family relocated from South Dakota to Alexandria, Virginia. His father, Owen Joseph Donley, had been a lawyer and the chief of staff for Sen. George S. McGovern (D-SD) for eight years. Kerry Donley graduated with a BA in political science and English from Marquette University and did some graduate studies at the University of Southern California. He was Senior Vice President of Community Banking at Virginia Commerce Bank until 2014, when he became a Senior Vice President at John Marshall Bank.

== Community service and political career ==
Donley began his public service as a member of Washington Area Housing Partners. He also served as a Co-Chair of the Cameron Station Redevelopment Task Force, which oversaw the redevelopment of the headquarters of the Defense Logistics Agency in west Alexandria from 1988 to 2005.

Donley was elected a member of the Alexandria City Council on the Democratic ticket and served from 1988 to 1996. In 1993, he received the most votes for City Council and was thus appointed Vice-Mayor, as is the practice on the Council. In 1996, Donley was elected Mayor of Alexandria. He served two terms until 2003.

After a brief hiatus, Donley ran again for City Council and was again elected in 2009; he served as Vice-Mayor until his retirement from the City Council in 2012. Donley unsuccessfully ran to become mayor again in 2015, losing the Democratic primary.

== Death ==
Donley died of a heart attack at his Alexandria home on July 13, 2022, at the age of 66. He was survived by his wife (Eva Shamblin), their five daughters, and extended family. His funeral Mass was held on July 25, 2022 at Blessed Sacrament Catholic Church, Alexandria.

Political offices
| Preceded by Patsy Ticer | Mayor of the City of Alexandria, Virginia; 1988–1996 | Succeeded by William D. Euille |
