= Patsy Ticer =

American politician (1935–2017)

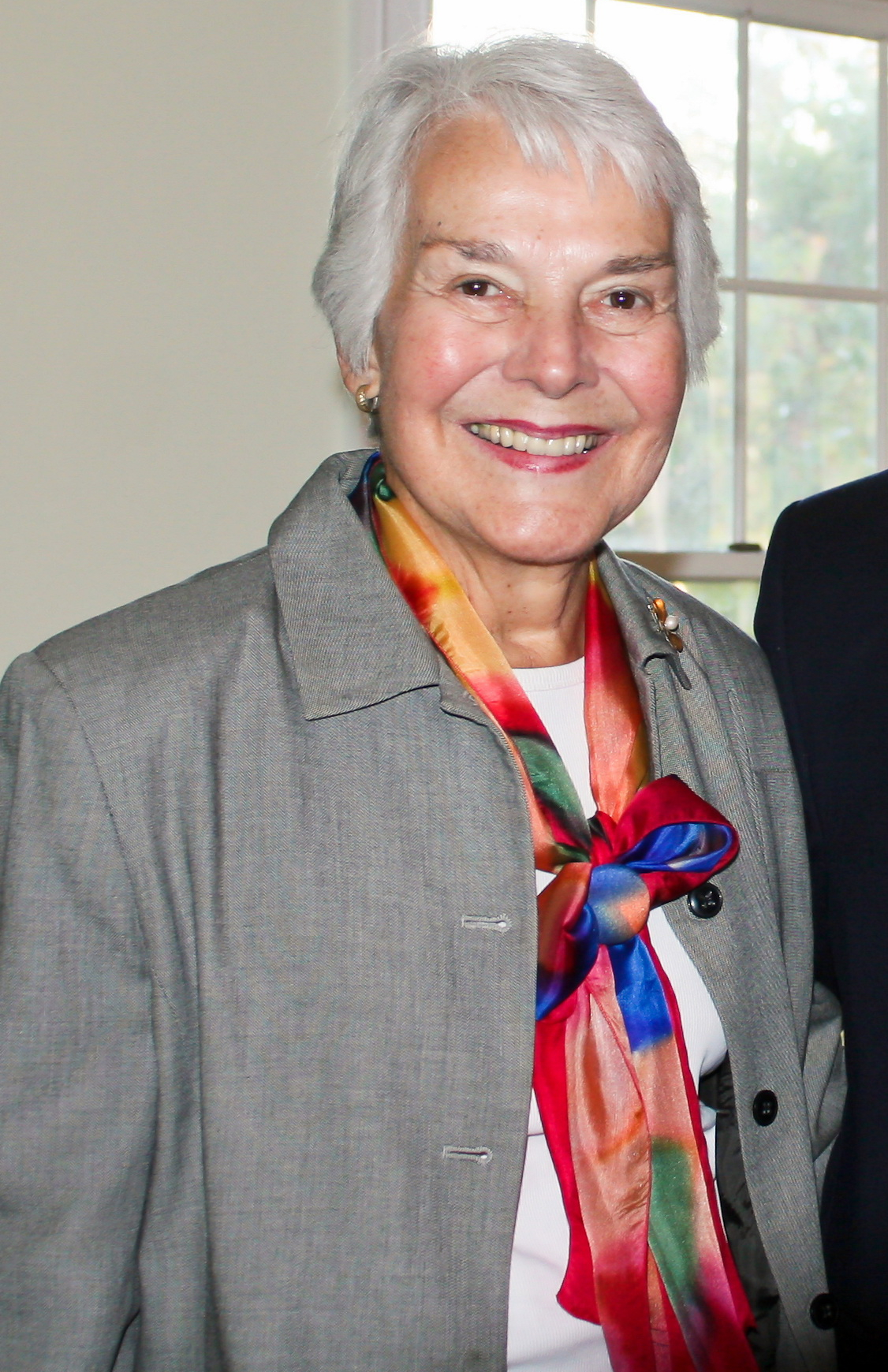

Member of the Virginia Senate from the 30th district
- In office January 10, 1996 – January 11, 2012
- Preceded by: Bob Calhoun
- Succeeded by: Adam Ebbin

Mayor of Alexandria, Virginia
- In office January 2, 1991 – January 5, 1996
- Preceded by: Jim Moran
- Succeeded by: Kerry J. Donley

Personal details
- Born: Patricia Keyser Smith; January 6, 1935 Washington, D.C., U.S.
- Died: August 7, 2017 (aged 82) Alexandria, Virginia, U.S.
- Party: Democratic
- Spouse: John "Jack" Ticer (m. 1956; died 2007)
- Children: 4
- Education: Sweet Briar College

Patricia Keyser Ticer (née Smith; January 6, 1935 – August 7, 2017), known as Patsy Ticer, was an American politician.

Ticer was born in Washington, D.C. She grew up in Alexandria, Virginia and graduated from George Washington High School. In 1955, Ticer received her bachelor's degree in political science from Sweet Briar College. Ticer served on the Alexandria City Council in the 1980s. She then served as Mayor of Alexandria from 1991 to 1996. Ticer served in the Senate of Virginia from 1996 to 2011 and was a Democrat. Ticer died in a hospital in Alexandria, Virginia from complications from a fall.

== Biography ==
Ticer married John "Jack" Ticer in 1956. They had four children. She was a real estate agent and served on the boards of Alexandria Library, Athenaeum, the Humane Society, and the United Way. She served as vestry senior warden of St. Paul's Episcopal Church in 1978, 1979 and from 1981 to 1983.

Ticer was elected to the city council in 1982 and served as Vice-Mayor in her second council term. She was elected mayor in 1991, and was the city's first female mayor.

Political offices
| Preceded by Jim Moran | Mayor of the City of Alexandria, Virginia; 1991–1996 | Succeeded by Kerry J. Donley |
Senate of Virginia
| Preceded by Bob Calhoun | Virginia Senate, District 30; 1996–2012 | Succeeded by Adam Ebbin |
