= William D. Euille =

American politician

William Euille
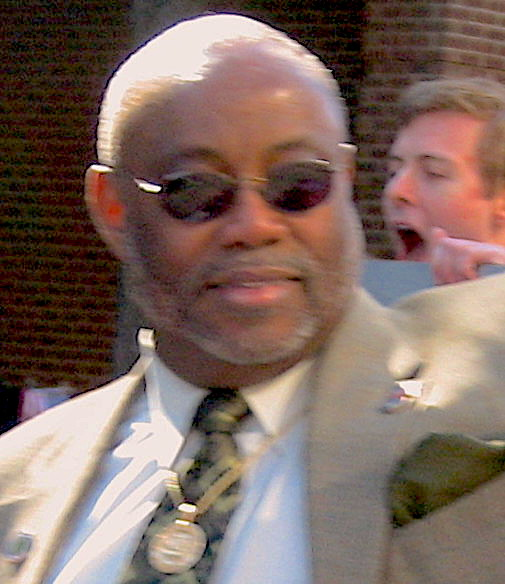

Mayor of Alexandria, Virginia
- In office July 1, 2003 – January 4, 2016
- Preceded by: Kerry J. Donley
- Succeeded by: Allison Silberberg

Personal details
- Born: 1950 (age 75–76) Alexandria, Virginia, U.S.
- Party: Democratic
- Education: Quinnipiac University

William Darnell "Bill" Euille (born 1950) is an American politician who served as the mayor of Alexandria, Virginia from 2003 until 2016, serving as the first African-American in the city's history to hold that position. He was also one of two alternates representing Virginia on the board of directors of the Washington Metropolitan Area Transit Authority. In 2020, Euille was appointed to the Virginia ABC board.

== Biography ==
Euille, a Democrat, graduated from Alexandria's T.C. Williams High School in 1968 and Quinnipiac University in 1972. He was on the Alexandria School Board from 1974 to 1984, and on the Alexandria City Council from 1994 until 2003, when he was elected Alexandria's first African-American mayor. Euille began his business career as an accountant with an Alexandria construction company in 1972, and within eight years, he advanced to Vice President/Controller, ultimately having responsibility for all contracting, financial and administrative functions.

A native of Alexandria, Virginia, Euille graduated from T.C. Williams High School and earned a bachelor's degree in accounting from Quinnipiac University in Hamden, Connecticut in 1972.

Euille is active in community affairs in Alexandria and Washington, DC. His dedicated involvement includes the William D. Euille Foundation, which he founded in 1994; the Alexandria Boys and Girls Club; the American Heart Association; 1998-2000 Chairman of the Alexandria United Way Campaign; INOVA Hospital Health System Board; Hopkins House Association; 2001 Chairman of the NOVA Urban League Board of Directors; Alexandria Community Trust; and the Scholarship Fund of Alexandria. He is a member of Ebenezer Baptist Church in Alexandria.

He is also active in business and construction industry organizations such as the Alexandria Chamber of Commerce; the US Chamber of Commerce; National Association of Minority Contractors; Associated Builders and Contractors, Inc; and the NOVA Building Industry Association.

Euille has received many major awards and honors, such as the 1994 Entrepreneur of the Year from the Virginia NAACP (The Mayor was the inaugural winner of this award); Who's Who in the East; Who's Who in America; 1995 Community Service Award from the Hopkins House Association; Outstanding Young Men of America Award; 1996 Blue Chip Award from the US Chamber of Commerce; the 1996 Entrepreneur of the Year from the Washington Post and Ernst & Young, LLP; the 1996 Small Business Person of the Year from the US Small Business Administration; and community service awards from the Alexandria NAACP (1996), Northern Virginia Urban League, Inc. (1997), Alexandria Chamber of Commerce (1997), and the Alexandria Sportsman Club (1998); Philanthropist of the Year 2000 from the Alexandria Chamber of Commerce; SBA's Graduate of the Year Award in 2000; Education Association of Alexandria's "Whole Village Award" (2001); and the Alexandria Chamber of Commerce Business Leader of the Year (2001).

Euille was elected to a three-year term on the Alexandria City Council in May 1994. He was re-elected in May 1997 (vice mayor) and in May 2000. He was elected the city's first African-American mayor in May 2003 and was re-elected mayor in May 2006, 2009 and in November 2012. He serves on the board of directors for the Washington Metropolitan Area Transportation Authority; the Northern Virginia Transportation Authority (NVTA). He is past chairman of the Northern Virginia Transportation Commission (NVTC) and past president of the Virginia Transit Authority (VTA). Additionally, he is chairman of the Washington Metropolitan Council of Governments (COG), serves on the Governor's Council on Virginia Future, and president of the Virginia Municipal League (VML).

Following the election of Terry McAuliffe as Governor of Virginia in 2013, Euille traveled to Richmond where he discussed the possibility of joining the incoming administration. Euille ultimately stayed on as Mayor and did not take a state-level job.

In 2015, Euille lost the primary to Vice Mayor Allison Silberberg. He then ran against Silberberg as a write-in candidate, but lost with 34% of the vote. Silberberg was sworn in on January 4, 2016.

In 2019, Euille was appointed by Governor Ralph Northam to the Virginia Alcoholic Beverage Control Authority's governing board for a five-year term beginning in January 2020.

Political offices
Preceded by Kerry J. Donley	Mayor of the City of Alexandria, Virginia; 2003–2016	Succeeded by Allison Silberberg
