= Richard Conway =

Richard or Dick Conway may refer to:

- Dick Conway (baseball) (1865–1926), American baseball player
- Dick Conway (rugby union) (born 1935), New Zealand rugby player
- Richard Conway (mayor) (1740–1806), Merchant and politician in Colonial Virginia
- Richard Conway (special effects artist) (1942–2021), Academy Award nominated special effects artist
- Richard Conway (writer), see List of Captain Scarlet and the Mysterons episodes
- Richard W. Conway (born 1931), American industrial engineer and computer scientist
