= Joshua Johnson (painter) =

African American artist

Joshua Johnson (also Johnston)
- Born: c. 1763
- Died: c. 1824
- Education: Self-taught
- Known for: Painting
- Movement: Naïve art

Joshua Johns[t]on (c. 1763 – c. 1824) was an American painter from the vicinity of Baltimore, Maryland of African and European ancestry. Johnson is known for his portrait paintings of prominent Maryland residents and their children. He was the "earliest documented professional African-American painter".

== Life ==
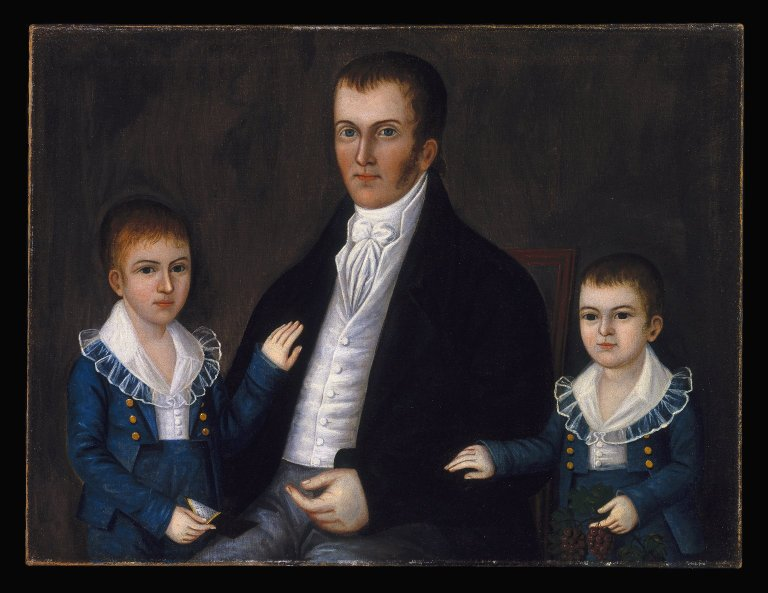
John Jacob Anderson and Sons, John and Edward, c. 1812, by Joshua Johnson, in the Brooklyn Museum

It was not until 1939 that the identity of the painter of elite late 18th- and early 19th-century Baltimoreans was discovered by art historian and genealogist J. Hall Pleasants, who believed that a man named Joshua Johnson painted a number of portraits, including thirteen attributed works. Pleasants attempted to put the puzzle of Johnson's life together; however, questions on Johnson's race, life dates, and even his last name (Johnson or Johnston) remained up until the mid-1990s, when the Maryland Historical Society released newly-found manuscripts regarding Johnson's life.

Documents dated July 25, 1782, state that Johnson was the "son of a white man and a black slave woman owned by a William Wheeler, Sr." His father, George Johnson (also spelled Johnston in some documents), purchased Joshua, age 19, from William Wheeler, a small Baltimore-based farmer, confirmed by a bill of sale dating from October 6, 1764.

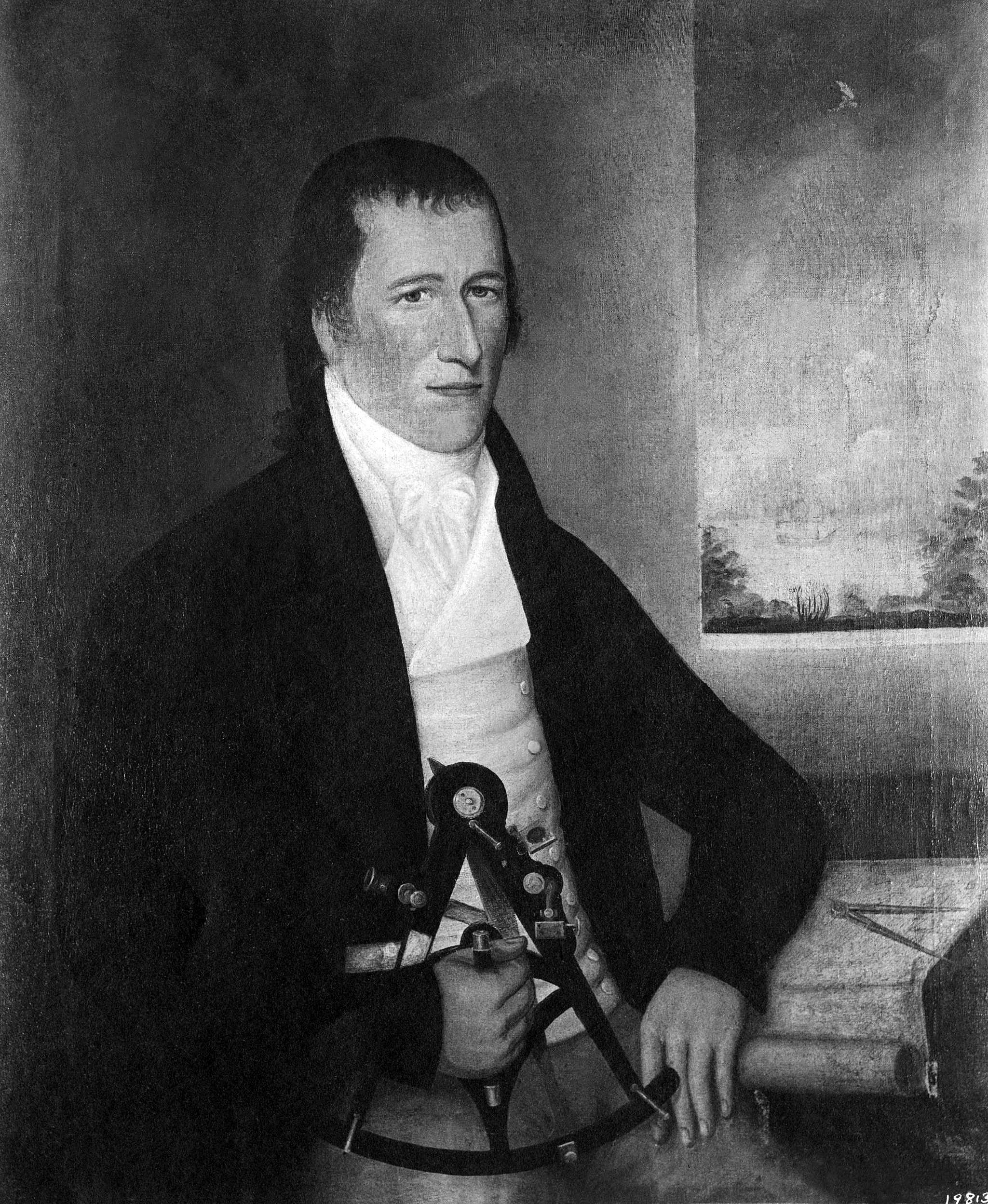
Captain Thomas Sprigg, c. 1805-1810, by Joshua Johnson, last recorded in a private collection in Maryland

Wheeler sold Johnson the young man for £25, half the average price of male slave field hand at the time. The documents state little of Joshua's mother, not even her name, and she may have been owned by Wheeler, whose own records stated that he owned two women, one of whom had two children.

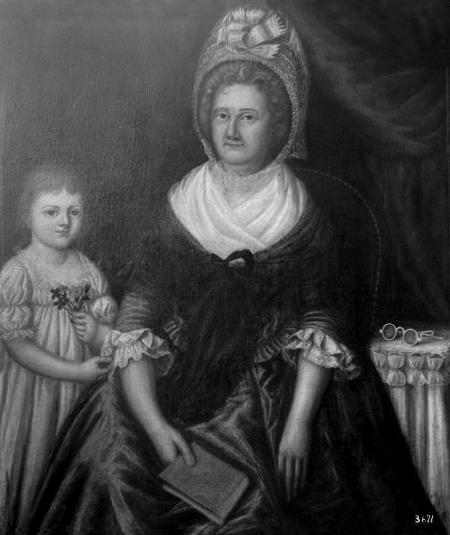
Mrs. John Moale (Ellin North) and Her Granddaughter, Ellin North Moale. Oil on canvas, 40 1/2 x 35 3/8 in. Photographed in a private collection in Baltimore, Maryland

A manumission was also released, in which George Johnson acknowledged Joshua as his son, also stating that he would agree to free Joshua under the conditions that he either completed an apprenticeship with Baltimore blacksmith William Forepaugh or turned 21, whichever came first. The manumission was signed and confirmed by justice of the peace Colonel John Moale, who would, during 1798–1800, commission Joshua to paint a portrait of his wife and granddaughter, Mrs. John Moale and Her Granddaughter, Ellin North Moale (illustrated at left).

=== Freedom ===
Johnson received his freedom in 1782 and began advertising, identifying himself as a portrait painter and limner as of 1796. He moved frequently, residing often where other artists, specifically chair-makers, lived, which suggests that he may have provided extra income for himself by painting chairs. His frequent moving also may indicate that he tended to work for clients near whom he lived. No records mention educational or creative training, and it still has not been proven that he had any relationship with artists such as the Peale family, Ralph Earl, or Ralph Earl Jr.

Catholic Church records show that in 1785, he married his first wife, Sarah, with whom he had four children – two sons and two daughters, the latter of whom both died young. By 1803, he was married to a woman named Clara. According to the Baltimore city directory of 1817–1818, he was listed in the section "Free Householders of Colour"; in 1825, he had moved to Frederick County, Maryland, and two years later moved to Anne Arundel County, again, following the paths of those whose portraits he painted. Little is known of his life after this final move or of his death.

== Artistic career and style ==
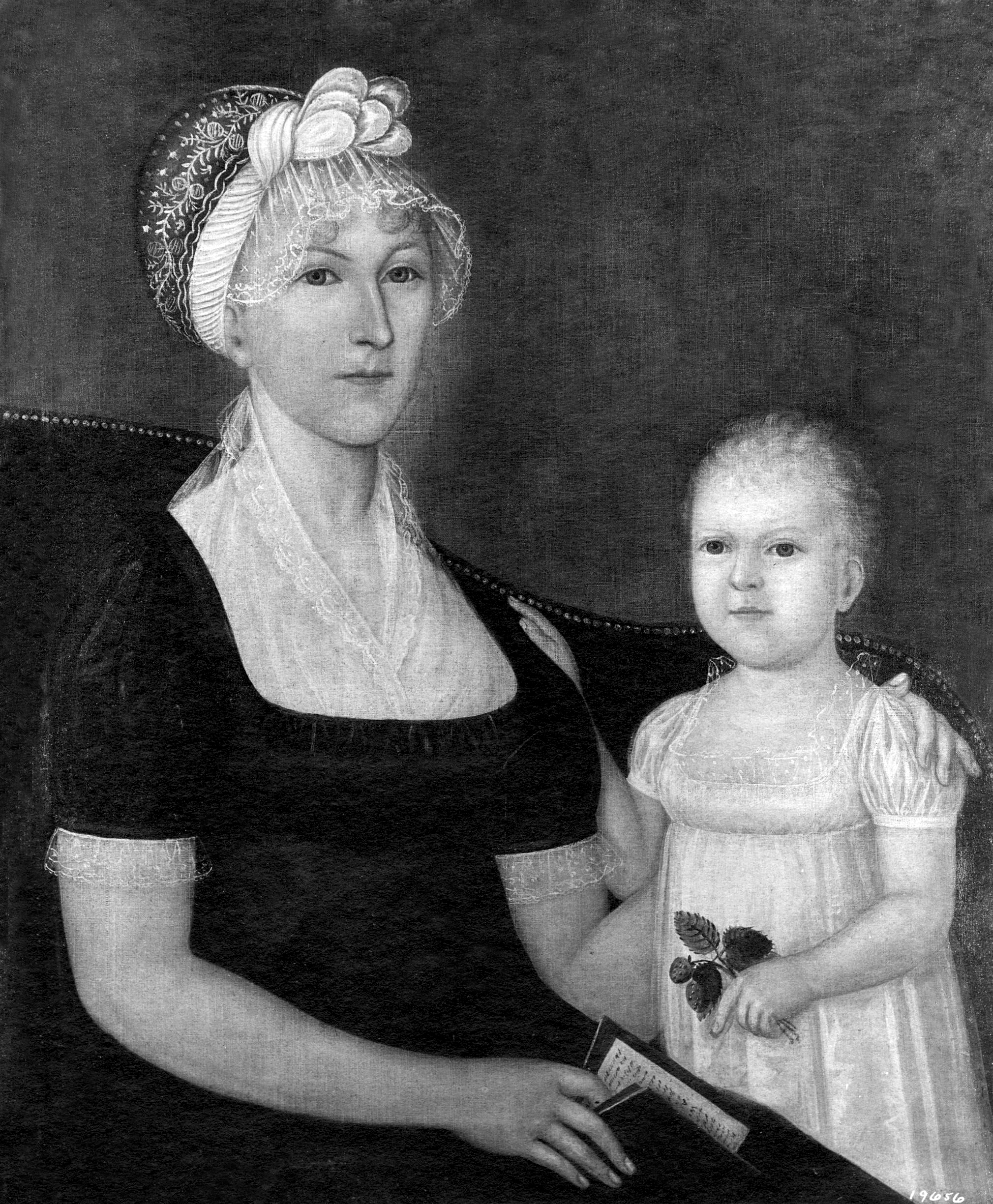
Mrs. Abraham White Jr. (Martha Bussey) and Rose Elizabeth White (Mrs. Abner Neale), c. 1810. Oil on canvas, 30 x 25 in. Photographed in a private collection in Westminster, Maryland

=== Style ===
Grace Allison McCurdy and Her Daughters, Mary Jane and Letitia Grace, c. 1804, Corcoran Gallery of Art

Recent research has brought to light that Johnson was not associated with the Peale family; however, his work is still associated with names such as Charles Peale Polk, whose naive painting and less sophisticated work (compared to his other family members) is similar to Johnson's. In his advertisement in the Baltimore Intelligencer of December 19, 1798, Johnson called his portraiture the work of "a self-taught genius, deriving from nature and industry his knowledge of the Art."

His work, however, is more similar to lesser known limners who worked during the same time in the mid-Atlantic region, such as: John Drinker, Frederick Kemmelmeyer, Jacob Frymire and Caleb Boyle. Johnson may have been more than familiar with the work of these artists than previously thought; in 1818, he was commissioned by patron Rebecca Myring Everette to copy Boyle's 1807 portrait of her husband, Thomas Everett.

Johnson's work has also been compared to Ralph Earl, who, like Johnson, also utilized brass upholstery tacks, swagged curtains, and open window vistas in his paintings. However, a stronger comparison lies between Johnson and Earl's son, Ralph Eleaser Whiteside Earl. Both were noted for painting multi-figure family group portraits, which were rare during this period of American art. Both are considered prominent self-taught "folk" artists, but it can only be theorized whether they ever came into contact within similar circles.

=== The Westwood Children ===
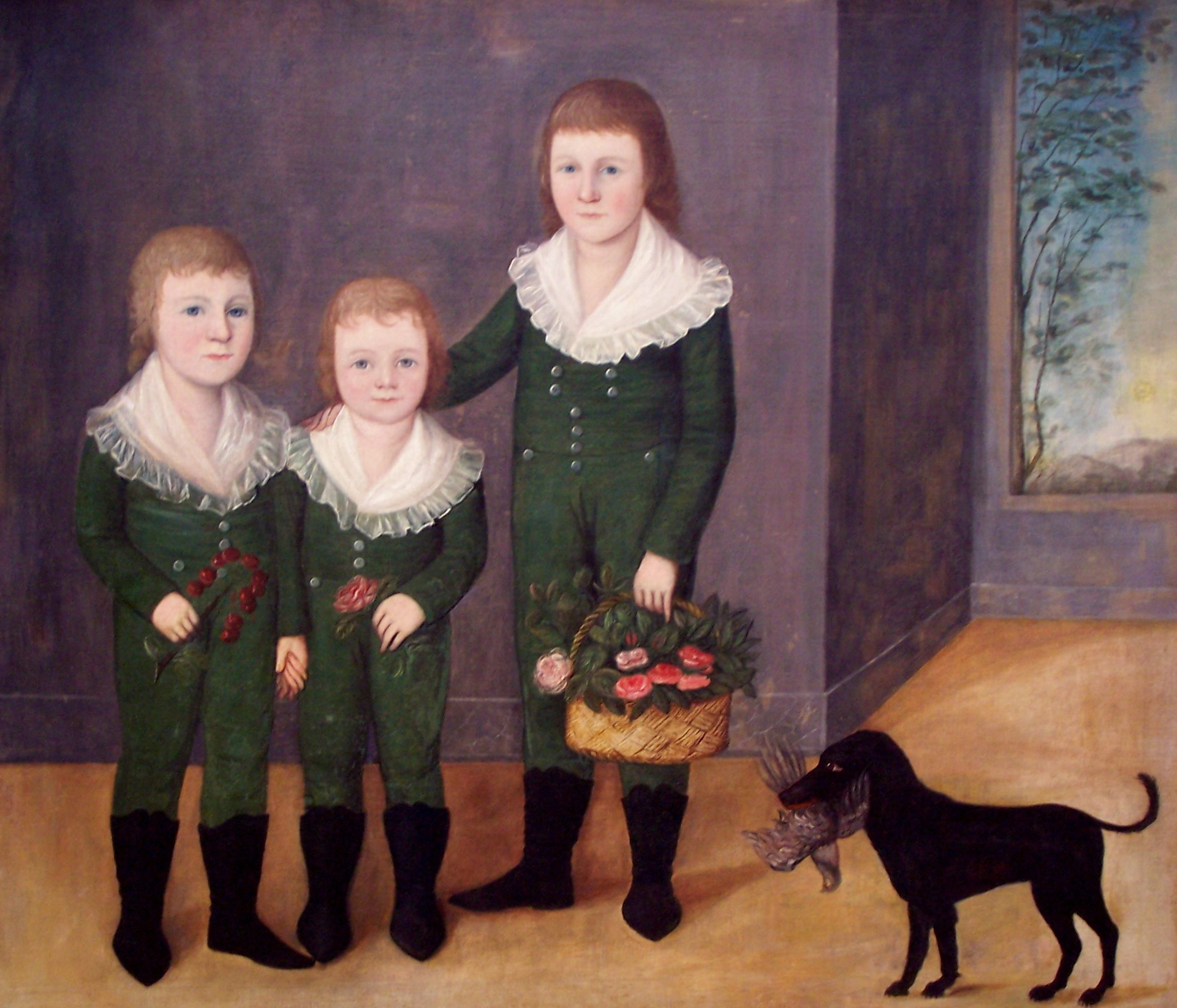
The Westwood Children, c. 1807, National Gallery of Art

In his painting The Westwood Children (now in the National Gallery of Art), Johnson depicts the male children of Margaret and John Westwood, who was a successful Baltimore stagecoach manufacturer. The painting is stylized and depicts the three children holding flowers in their hands, accompanied by the family dog, which holds a bird in its mouth. The children have chilled, expressionless stares, although the youngest child seems to be on the verge of smiling.

=== Mrs. Martha (Hall) Dorsey and Mary Ann Dorsey ===
On January 19, 2024, an intimate portrait of Mrs. Martha Dorsey and Mary Ann Dorsey by Joshua Johnson, set a new world auction record, selling for $1,134,000 at Christie’s annual auction of Important Americana in New York.

== List of known works ==
- Letitia Grace McCurdy (c.1800-1802), Fine Arts Museums of San Francisco
- Portrait of Adelia Ellender (c. 1803-1805), Smithsonian American Art Museum
- Archibald Dobbin (1764–1830) (1803), Maryland Center for History and Culture
- Grace Allison McCurdy and Her Daughters, Mary Jane and Letitia Grace (c. 1804), Corcoran Gallery of Art
- Mrs. Martha (Hall) Dorsey and Mary Ann Dorsey (c. 1804-05), private collection
- Potrait of a Gentleman (c. 1805), Nelson-Atkins Museum of Art
- Emma Van Name (c. 1805), Metropolitan Museum of Art
- Portrait of a Cleric (c. 1805), Bowdoin College Museum of Art
- McCormick Family (c.1805), Maryland Center for History and Culture
- Captain Thomas Sprigg, (c. 1805-1810), private collection
- Isabella (Mrs. James) Millholland (c. 1807), Maryland Center for History and Culture
- The Westwood Children (c. 1807), National Gallery of Art
- Portrait of Sea Captain John Murphy (c. 1810), Smithsonian American Art Museum
- Portrait of Mrs. Barbara Baker Murphy (Wife of Sea Captain) (c. 1810), Smithsonian American Art Museum
- Mrs. Abraham White Jr. (Martha Bussey) and Rose Elizabeth White (Mrs. Abner Neale), (c. 1810), private collection
- Portrait of Archbishop John Carroll (c. 1810-1815), Archdiocese of Baltimore
- Unidentified Man (c. 1810), Pennsylvania Academy of the Fine Arts
- Unidentified Woman (c. 1810), Pennsylvania Academy of the Fine Arts
- John Jacob Anderson and Sons, John and Edward (c. 1812), Brooklyn Museum
- Charles Burnett (c. 1812), Maryland Center for History and Culture
- Mary Ann Jewins Burnett (c. 1812), Maryland Center for History and Culture
- Rebecca Myring Everette (Mrs. Thomas Everette) and her Children (c.1818), Maryland Center for History and Culture
- Greenbury Wilson (c. 1820), Maryland Center for History and Culture
- Elijah Stansbury (c. 1821), Maryland Center for History and Culture
- Mrs. John Moale (Ellin North) and Her Granddaughter, Ellin North Moale, private collection
- Portrait of Elizabeth Gilpin, Birmingham Museum of Art
