= Cuthbert Powell =

American politician (1775–1849)

Member of the U.S. House of Representatives from Virginia's 14th district
- In office March 4, 1841 – March 3, 1843
- Preceded by: William M. McCarty
- Succeeded by: George W. Summers

Member of the Virginia House of Delegates for Loudoun County
- In office December 1, 1828 – December 6, 1829 Serving with William Ellzey
- Preceded by: Asa Rogers
- Succeeded by: James McIlhaney

Member of the Virginia Senate for Loudoun and Fauquier Counties
- In office 1815–1819
- Preceded by: Burr Powell
- Succeeded by: William H. Fitzhugh

Mayor of Alexandria, D.C.
- In office 1808–1809
- Preceded by: Jonah Thompson
- Succeeded by: William Herbert

Personal details
- Born: March 4, 1775 Alexandria, Virginia Colony, British America
- Died: May 8, 1849 (aged 74) Llangollen, Loudoun County, Virginia, U.S.
- Resting place: Llangollen cemetery
- Party: Whig
- Occupation: Lawyer, politician

Cuthbert Powell (March 4, 1775 – May 8, 1849) was a Virginia lawyer and Whig politician who served in both houses of the Virginia General Assembly and one term in the U.S. representative from Virginia, like his father, former Congressman Leven Powell.

== Early and family life ==
Born in Alexandria, Virginia, to the former Sally Harrison and her husband Leven Powell, a planter and merchant in Loudoun County who had volunteered to fight the British as the American Revolutionary War started and who would also serve in the Virginia House of Delegates and U.S. House of Representatives. Both parents could trace their descent from the First Families of Virginia. The family included several other children, including Burr Powell, whom Cuthbert would succeed in the Virginia senate. He received a private education customary for his class, then studied law.

In 1799, he married Catherine Simms, daughter of Col. Charles Simms, who like his father Maj. Powell had served as a Continental Army officer, then returned to become a lawyer in Alexandria (and would become its mayor during the War of 1812). The couple had at least five children, including Charles Leven Powell (1804-1896; who lost two sons in the Confederate Army, one at each Battle of Manassas) and Cuthbert Harrison Powell (1810-1897), and Ann Powell Powell (1800-1885; who married her cousin Dr. William Leven Powell), Mary Ellen Powell Adie (1807-1893; who married her cousin Cuthbert Powell, then Rev. Adie), Ellen Douglas Powell Gray (1812-1862; who married William Hill Gray who twice served in the Virginia House of Delegates) and Jane Serena Powell Norris (1815-1901).

== Career ==
After admission to the Virginia bar, Powell practiced in Alexandria (then part of the District of Columbia), where he would eventually be elected mayor. In 1806 he became a member of Alexandria's city council, and served as the city's mayor in 1808–1809. He also joined a company formed in 1808 to build a turnpike into the new federal city across the Potomac River. Other members included fellow lawyers Edmund J. Lee and Thomas Swann, as well as Jonah Thompson, Charles Alexander, Jacob Hoffman and John Mandeville.

Possibly after his father's death in 1810, Cuthbert Powell moved to Loudon County where he farmed using enslaved labor. In the 1820 census, he owned 21 enslaved people in Leesburg, the county seat, of which 10 were involved in farming. A decade later, he owned 18 enslaved people. In the final census of his lifetime, Powell owned 29 enslaved people.

In addition to holding various local offices, Powell continued his political career, succeeding his brother Burr Powell (a lawyer in Middleburg) in the Senate of Virginia and serving from 1815 until 1819. Powell much later, in 1828, won election to the Virginia House of Delegates, but only served a single term.

Powell was elected as a Whig to the Twenty-seventh Congress (March 4, 1841 – March 3, 1843). Possibly his last political task was chairing the committee to greet fellow Whig and former President John Quincy Adams when he visited Leesburg in 1844.

== Death and legacy ==
Powell died at his Llangollen estate in Loudoun County near the town of Upperville on May 8, 1849. He was interred in its private cemetery, but his widow returned to Alexandria. Two of his grandsons who had emigrated to Illinois, but returned to Virginia and joined the Confederate States Army, died in Manassas, one at each of the battles for that crucial railroad junction. Another grandson, Rev. Arthur Powell Gray Sr. (1853-1921)(son of delegate then Judge William H. Gray and this man's daughter Ellen Douglas Powell), or great-grandson of the same name and also an Episcopal priest and University of Virginia graduate, circa 1908 revitalized the now-historic Bear Mountain Indian Mission School and associated mission church (which burned in the 1930s but was rebuilt and continues today).

== Sources ==
- United States Congress. "Cuthbert Powell (id: P000479)". Biographical Directory of the United States Congress.

U.S. House of Representatives
Preceded by William M. McCarty	Member of the U.S. House of Representatives from Virginia's 14th congressional district 1841 – 1843	Succeeded by George W. Summers
