= Van Name =

Van Name is a surname. Notable people with the surname include:

- Addison Van Name, American philologist and librarian
- Calvin D. Van Name, American lawyer and politician
- Cynthia Hicks Van Name Leonard, American suffragist, aid worker and writer
- Elsie Van Name, American screenwriter and actress
- Mark L. Van Name, American science fiction writer and technology consultant

== See also ==
- Emma Van Name, an 1805 portrait painting by Joshua Johnson
