= William Herbert (mayor) =

American merchant and mayor

James Hendricks

Mayor of Alexandria, Virginia
- In office 1782–1783
- Preceded by: James Hendricks
- Succeeded by: Richard Conway

Mayor of Alexandria, D.C.
- In office 1809–1812
- Preceded by: Cuthbert Powell
- Succeeded by: Charles Simms

Personal details
- Born: 1743 County Kerry, Ireland
- Died: February 24, 1818 (aged 74–75) Alexandria, Virginia, U.S.
- Resting place: Christ Church
- Spouse: Sarah Fairfax Carlyle
- Relations: John Carlyle (father-in-law)
- Children: 7, including John Carlyle Herbert
- Occupation: Politician, banker, merchant

William Herbert (1743 – February 24, 1818) was an Irish American politician, banker, and merchant in Colonial Virginia who served two non-consecutive terms as the mayor of Alexandria, Virginia and mayor of Alexandria, D.C.

== Early life and family ==
Herbert was born in 1743 in County Kerry, Ireland. He emigrated to Virginia in 1773.

Herbert married Sarah Fairfax Carlyle, daughter of Col. John Carlyle and Sarah Fairfax Carlyle (daughter of William Fairfax). They had seven children:

- Congressman John Carlyle Herbert (1775–1846) (married Mary Snowden)
- William Herbert Jr. (1786-1851) (married Henrietta Maria Dulany)
- Margaret Herbert Fairfax (1785–1858) (married her first cousin, Thomas Fairfax, 9th Lord Fairfax of Cameron)
- Sarah Herbert (1791–1823) (married Rev. Oliver Norris, Rector of Christ Church, Alexandria)
- Anne Herbert (c. 1787-1864)
- Eliza Herbert (c. 1795-1865)
- Lucinda Herbert (died 1830)

== Career ==
Upon moving to Alexandria, Herbert established himself as a merchant and quickly entered Virginia society. Herbert was a personal friend of George Washington and frequent visitor to Mount Vernon.

In 1780, Herbert became a vestryman of Christ Church. In 1783, he was elected as Secretary of Masonic Lodge No. 39 in Alexandria. Herbert was one of the founding trustees of the Alexandria Bank in 1792. In 1798, Herbert became the second president of the Alexandria Bank. During the building of the bank, the funds of the bank were kept in the Carlyle House which was his primary residence at the time. In 1799, he was an honorary pallbearer for George Washington's funeral.

=== Mayor ===
Herbert was elected as the third mayor of Alexandria, serving from 1782 to 1783. From 1809 to 1812, Herbert again served as mayor of Alexandria. During the War of 1812, Herbert was appointed to the Alexandria Committee of Vigilance, which was responsible for monitoring the approach of British troops.

== Death ==
Herbert died in 1818. He is interred at the Christ Church Episcopal Cemetery.
