= Richard Conway (mayor) =

American merchant and mayor (1740–1806)

Mayor of Alexandria, Virginia
- In office 1783–1784
- Preceded by: William Herbert
- Succeeded by: James Keith

Personal details
- Born: November 11, 1740 Virginia, British America
- Died: November 27, 1806 (aged 66) Alexandria, Virginia, U.S.
- Spouse: Mary West
- Relations: Nelly Conway Madison (cousin)
- Occupation: Politician, merchant

Richard Conway (November 11, 1740 – November 27, 1806) was a politician, shipowner, and merchant in Colonial Virginia who served as the fourth mayor of Alexandria, Virginia.

== Early life and family ==
Conway was born on November 11, 1740, in Virginia, the son of John and Frances Conway. Through his paternal side, he was a descendant of Colonel Edwin Conway, a member of the Virginia House of Burgesses. He was also a relative of Nelly Conway, mother of James Madison. Conway was married to Mary West, the daughter of Colonel John West IV and a great-great-granddaughter of Colonial Governor John West.

== Career ==
=== Business ===
Conway was an active merchant in Alexandria and a shipowner. He commanded merchant vessels on the Potomac River. In 1752, Conway was one of the benefactors of the Alexandria Town Hall and Court House, along with John Carlyle and William Ramsay.

Conway was the owner of the shipping vessels Molly and Betsey which operated on the U.S. East Coast. He was also a shareholder in the Marine Insurance Company of Alexandria, the Potomac Company, and the Theatre of Alexandria.

=== Public service ===
During the American Revolutionary War, Conway served as a captain in the Continental Army. Conway's ship, Betsey, was captured by British troops at Sandy Hook in 1778.

In 1787, Conway became a Justice of the Peace for Fairfax County. Conway was a close personal friend of George Washington. In March 1789, he lent £625 ($95,000 in 2023, adjusted to inflation) to Washington one month before he assumed the Presidency to settle some Virginia debts and fund his trip to Federal Hall for his inauguration in New York.

In 1783, Conway became the fourth mayor of Alexandria. Shortly after his term as mayor, Conway presented grievances to the Virginia General Assembly regarding foreign trade policy, which helped lead to the Mount Vernon Conference of 1785 which governed state rights on the Potomac River, Pocomoke River, and Chesapeake Bay.

In 1793, Conway was one of the founding board members of the Bank of Alexandria. In 1802, Conway was offered an appointment by Thomas Jefferson as a justice of the peace for the county, but declined the appointment.

== Death ==
Conway died on November 27, 1806, aged 66. In his will, Conway left his wife at least eight enslaved persons and emancipated at least one slave. His executors included his friend Edmund Jennings Lee.
