= List of mayors of Alexandria, Virginia =

Mayor of Alexandria
- Seal of the City of Alexandria

- Flag of the City of Alexandria

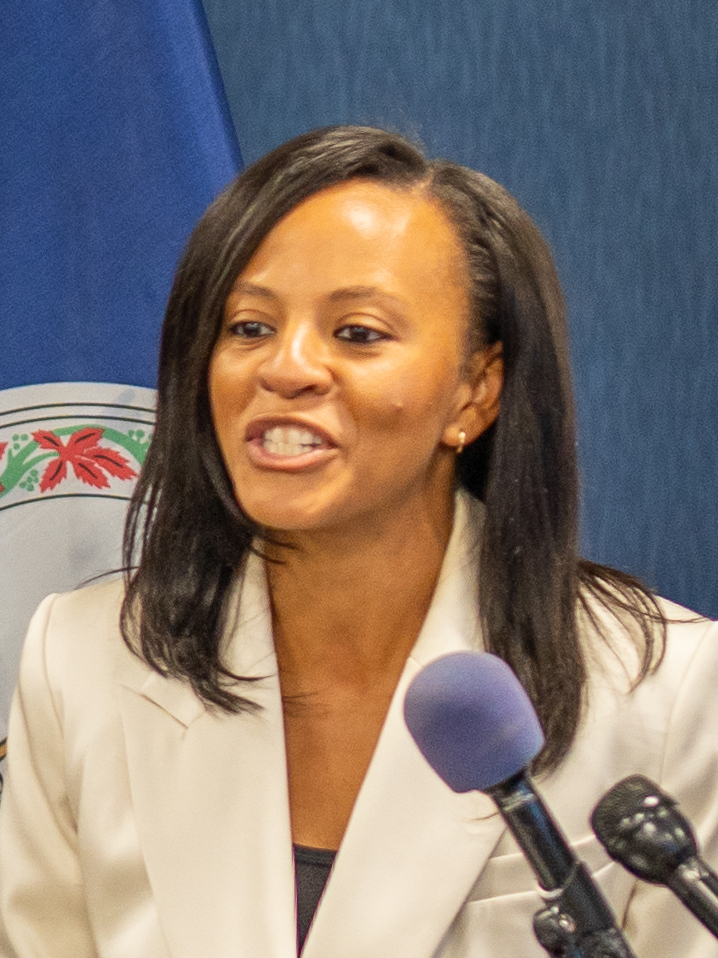
- Incumbent; Alyia Gaskins since January 2, 2025
- Style: The Honorable
- Term length: 3 years
- Inaugural holder: Robert T. Hooe
- Formation: 1780
- Deputy: Vice Mayor of Alexandria
- Website: Official website

The mayor of Alexandria, Virginia serves as the ceremonial head of government of the independent City of Alexandria, Virginia. Elected at large by the voters of the city, the mayor serves a three-year term. The incumbent, Alyia Gaskins, was first elected in the 2024 election.

== List of mayors of Alexandria (1780–) ==
=== Before joining the District of Columbia (1780–1801) ===
- Robert T. Hooe 1780–1781
- James Hendricks 1781–1782
- William Herbert 1782–1783
- Richard Conway 1783–1784
- James Keith 1784–1785
- James Kirk 1785–1786
- David Arell 1786
- John Fitzgerald 1786–1787
- William Hunter, Jr. 1787–1788
- Jesse Taylor 1788–1789
- Dennis Ramsay 1789–1790
- William Hunter, Jr. 1790–1791
- Philip Marsteller 1791–1792
- Jesse Taylor 1792–1793
- Dennis Ramsay 1793–1794
- Robert Mease 1794–1795
- John Dundas 1795–1796
- Jonah Thompson 1796–1797
- Francis Peyton 1797–1798
- John Dundas 1798–1799
- Francis Peyton 1799–1800
- Amos Alexander 1800–1801

=== While included within the District of Columbia (1801–1847) ===
- George Taylor 1801–1802
- Alexander Smith 1802
- George Washington Slacum 1802–1803
- Jacob Hoffman 1803–1804
- Elisha C. Dick 1804–1805
- Jonah Thompson 1805–1808
- Cuthbert Powell 1808–1809
- William Herbert 1809–1812
- Charles Simms 1812–1815
- Edmund J. Lee 1815–1818
- Jacob Hoffman 1818–1821
- Christopher Neale 1821–1824
- John Roberts 1824–1827
- Thomson Francis Mason 1827–1830
- John Roberts 1830–1833
- Bernard Hooe Jr. 1833–1836
- George Wise 1836–1837
- Bernard Hooe Jr. 1837–1840
- Edgar Snowden 1840–1843
- Robert G. Violett 1843
- Joseph Eaches 1843–1846
- William Veitch 1846–1847

=== After retrocession of the City of Alexandria and Alexandria County back to Virginia (1847–present) ===
- William Veitch 1847–1849
- Isaac Buckingham 1849–1850
- Lawrence Berry Taylor 1850–1853
- John Muir 1853–1854
- George P. Wise 1854–1857
- William Duncan Massey 1857–1860
- William B. Price 1860–1861
- Lewis McKenzie 1861–1863
- Charles A. Ware 1863–1866
- Hugh Latham 1866–1868
- William Norris Berkley 1868–1869
- Hugh Latham 1869–1872
- William Norris Berkley 1872–1874
- Kosciusko Kemper 1874–1876
- J. B. Johnson 1876–1877
- Kosciusko Kemper 1877–1878
- Courtland H. Smith 1878–1881
- James T. Beckham 1881–1885
- John B. Smoot 1885–1887
- E. E. Downham 1887–1891
- Henry Strauss 1891–1897
- George L. Simpson 1897–1903
- F. J. Paff 1903–1912
- Thomas Fisher 1912–1920
- James M. Duncan 1920–1922
- William Albert Smoot 1922–1930
- Robert Simpson Jones 1930
- Carroll Pierce 1930–1931
- Edmund F. Ticer 1931–1934
- Emmett C. Davison 1934–1937
- Richard Ruffner 1937–1940
- William T. Wilkins 1940–1949
- Franklin P. Backus 1949–1952
- Marshall J. Beverley 1952–1955
- Leroy S. Bendheim 1955–1961
- Frank E. Mann 1961–1967
- Charles E. Beatley 1967–1976
- Frank E. Mann 1976–1979
- Charles E. Beatley 1979–1985
- Jim Moran 1985–1991
- Patsy Ticer 1991–1996, first female mayor
- Kerry J. Donley 1996–2003
- William D. Euille 2003–2016, first African-American mayor
- Allison Silberberg 2016–2019
- Justin Wilson 2019–2025
- Alyia Gaskins 2025–present, first African-American female mayor

== See also ==
- Timeline of Alexandria, Virginia
- History of Alexandria, Virginia
