= James Hendricks (colonist) =

American military officer and mayor

Mayor of Alexandria, Virginia
- In office 1781–1782
- Preceded by: Robert T. Hooe
- Succeeded by: William Herbert

Personal details
- Died: June 24, 1806 Wilkes County, Georgia, U.S.

Military service
- Allegiance: United States
- Branch/service: Continental Army
- Years of service: 1776–1779
- Rank: Colonel
- Battles/wars: American Revolutionary War: Battle of Fort Washington; Battle of Trenton; Battle of Princeton; Forage War; Battle of Brandywine

James Hendricks (c. 1740s – abt. July 26, 1806) was a merchant and farmer who became a Continental Army officer during Revolutionary War, the second mayor of Alexandria, Virginia, and Georgia's chairman of the board of commissioners for the Treaty of Colerain.

== Before the American Revolution ==
While little is known of his early life, Hendricks was born likely in the 1740s in northern Virginia, possibly in the town of Alexandria or the surrounding Fairfax County. In 1772, he traveled to Carlisle, Pennsylvania with the Alexandria tavern keeper and Pennsylvania-native Richard Arell to request Rev. William Thom serve as the first installed minister of Alexandria's newly built Presbyterian Church.

== Military service ==
The Independent Company of Alexandria, also known as the Independent Company of Fairfax, was organized on 21 September 1774. Hendricks was its first captain. The Independent Company was the first of many independent volunteer militia groups that formed prior to the start of the American Revolution.

After the American Revolutionary War began, by order of the Virginia Convention in December 1775, seven new regiments were formed consisting of ten companies and the usual complement of officers. This was accepted by Congress on 13 February 1776 with the field officers receiving commissions on this date. James Hendricks was duly appointed as one of those field officers, serving as major of the newly formed 6th Virginia Regiment. He was then later promoted to its Lieutenant Colonel 13 August 1776. The 6th Virginia would see action throughout a series of battles in the New York and New Jersey campaign, including at the Battle of Fort Washington (16 November 1776), the Battle of Trenton (December 1776) and the Battle of Princeton (January 1777). Starting on 23 January 1777, men of the 6th Virginia Regiment were detached into separate actions which were fought at Bonhamtown, Quibbletown, and Woodbridge, New Jersey during the Forage War.

On 07 Apr 1777, General Washington wrote to the commanding officers of several Virginia Regiments on the deployable lack of necessities of the men under their command and that their men's unhealthiness makes them unfit to take the field. Lieutenant Colonel James Hendricks of the 6th Virginia Regiment, replied on 12 April 1777 by writing to General George Washington stating the terrible state of the 6th regiment and of Colonel Mordecai Buckner being unfit to continue leading the regiment.

In doing so, Lt. Col. Hendricks writes he has reluctantly taken over command despite being of ill health himself, and that he has spent his own funds without reimbursement to outfit many of his men, and if conditions do not improve he is considering resigning his commission. Washington's aide-de-camp replied that the General's letter was not directed only to his 6th regiment and that the General wishes he reconsider relinquishing the command.

In his letter, he also stated that the 6th Virginia regiment were dispersed at detachments in various locations throughout New Jersey including Whippany, Chatham, Newark, Elizabethtown, Passaic and Bonhamtown in mid-April 1777. Of note, during this time Colonel Buckner was accused of fleeing during battle, tracked down and tried before a court martial and found guilty.

By 11 September 1777, he was transferred of the 1st Virginia Regiment, Virginia Continental Line, serving in the regiment during the Battle of Brandywine and on 29 September 1777, Hendricks was promoted as its Colonel. Unfortunately, Hendricks leadership was again tested when he was wounded at the Battle of Germantown on 4 October 1777 and spent time recovering from his wounds.

Under dispute are conflicting records that he resigned his commission by 10 February 1778 as he settled his pay account by 2 March 1778. The first account of his resignation occurred in 1781 or 82 and therefore, there is a significant presumption he served until at least March 1779, and which entitled him to land for three years service, which was granted with Virginia Military Land Warrant #7675 and in this warrant, Elizabeth Hunt (unknown relationship, possible wife or daughter)

== Merchant and mayor ==
Outside of his military service, Hendricks emerges as a merchant and civil servant in Alexandria, Virginia where in December 1780, he was elected as one of the town's first four Alderman, along with John Fitzgerald, William Bushby, and Robert McCrae.

Upon the next election cycle of 1781–82, Hendricks would succeed fellow patriot Colonel Robert T. Hooe as the city's second mayor.

While as serving as mayor on 12 April 1781, Virginia Governor Thomas Jefferson wrote to James Hendricks requesting his assistance with material aid in that cannons be placed along outskirts of the Georgetown and Alexandria to protect it from British ships.

On 7 May 1781, Hendricks wrote once again and informed Governor Jefferson that significant progress on the completion of many of the carriages with 9- and 12-pound cannonballs and that guns have been collected and mounted to be ready and defend the city, often at the personal expense of his own and those individuals involved. It is said, he also cajoled fellow merchants to release provisions with favorable credit, terms and prices to the Continental Army in support of the war effort.

One such example occurred on 10 September 1781, when General Washington wrote to Mayor James Hendricks to improve the conditions of the landings at Georgetown for the baggage wagons, cavalry, and cattle of the French & American Armies. Five days later, Washington asked him to deliver wheat flour for the troops in Georgetown without delay. On 20 Sep 1781, Hendricks wrote to Washington to update him on the great progress in Georgetown. He also mentions a concern he has that the French & American armies may be at odds with each other's efforts in obtaining wheat flour and beef for their troops and asks that Washington intercede and suggest they develop a better plan to do so.

After the war, Hendricks remained in Alexandria as shown by his advertisements in the Alexandria Gazette newspaper touting his James Hendricks & Co., shop posted in 1785.

== Indian affairs commissioner ==
By 1789–90, Hendricks had moved from Virginia to Georgia. He was appointed as one of the commissioners, representing the interests of the State of Georgia, for drafting the Treaty of New York (1790), which formed the basis of treaty of peace and friendship with Creek Nation chiefs and large amounts of land cessions, much of it in Georgia.

On 11 January 1794, Major Robert Forsyth (1754-1794) became the first federal law enforcement officer killed the line of duty while serving as U.S. Marshall for Georgia. From Wilkes County, Georgia, James Hendricks was hoping to parlay his relationship with Washington and wrote to the President on 15 January 1794 and twice more, each time about filling the vacancy left behind from Forsyth's death. Washington was not swayed by Hendrick's three letters and nominated Josiah Tattnall as the next federal marshal for Georgia.

Throughout the 1790s, Hendricks continued his involvement in Indian Affairs and in 1796, he was appointed as the chairman of the Board of Commissioners for the State of Georgia, for attending a follow-on treaty with the Creek Nation. Known as the Treaty of Colerain (1796), so named for its signing location, located in a now extinct town in southeastern Georgia in Camden County. During treaty negotiations, Hendricks led an antagonistic Georgia commission which argued that federal authorities exceeded their authority at the earlier Treaty of New York and demanded Georgia commissioners receive direct access with the Creek Nation representatives for its own negotiations without federal authorities present, even going so far as demanding his commissioners and the food/stores they had brought with them be protected their own Georgia militiamen and not federal troops. Eventually, U.S. authorities prevailed in negotiations and Hendrick's and fellow commissioners left empty handed, which outraged many Georgians. This treaty, amongst other cessions, reinforced boundary lines established between the Creek Nation and the United States from the Treaty of New York.

== Death ==
Hendricks' will was written on 3 June 1803 and recorded on 24 July 1806. The document identifies his surviving brother as John Hendricks, his wife as Kitty, her sister as Mrs. McRea and her niece as Allison (possibly Allison McRea or Rebecca Allison, as identified in Kitty's 1824 will). It describes his wishes for his horses, sheep, hogs, horn cattle and enslaved labor, including the disposition of his plots of oats, corn and cotton. Robert McRea was one of the executors.

His wife Kitty Hendricks' will written on 6 September 1824 and is probated and recorded 13 October 1825 in Wilkes County, Georgia, and mentioned no sons or daughters, leaving most all possessions, including enslaved persons, to her nieces.
