= History of Alexandria, Virginia =

Alexandria in American History

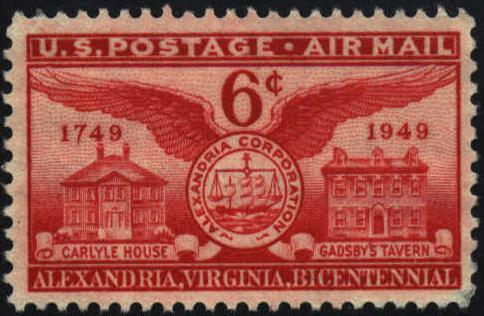
U.S. postage stamp honoring Alexandria's bicentennial in 1949, featuring the Carlyle House and Gadsby's Tavern

The history of Alexandria, Virginia, begins with the first European settlement in 1695. Over the next century, the town became a significant port. In 1801, much of Alexandria was swept into the new District of Columbia; it was damaged along with much of the rest of the capital during the War of 1812. In 1846, Alexandria was returned to Virginia, along with the rest of the District's territory on the western side of the Potomac River. After Virginia seceded in 1861, Alexandria was swiftly captured by Union forces and held for the remainder of the American Civil War. In the late 20th century, Alexandria became a key part of the rapidly growing Northern Virginia region.

== Colonial era ==
On October 21, 1669 a patent granted 6,000 acres (24 km^{2}) to Robert Howsing for transporting 120 people to the Colony of Virginia. That tract would later become the City of Alexandria. Virginia's comprehensive Tobacco Inspection Law of 1730 mandated that all tobacco grown in the colony must be brought to locally designated public warehouses for inspection before sale: one of the sites designated for a warehouse on the upper Potomac River was at the mouth of Hunting Creek. However, the ground being unsuitable at that location, the warehouse was established a half-mile up river, where the water ran deep near the shore.

In 1745, the colony lost a 10-year dispute with Lord Fairfax over the western boundary of the Northern Neck Proprietary. After the Privy Council in London found in favor of Lord Fairfax's expanded claim, some of the Fairfax County gentry banded together to form the Ohio Company of Virginia. Their intent was to establish trade into the interior of America and for this they required an entrepot close to the head of navigation on the Potomac. The Hunting Creek tobacco warehouse offered the best location for a trading port which could accommodate sailing ships. However, many of the local tobacco planters wanted a new town to be sited up Hunting Creek, away from the "played out" tobacco fields along the river.

Around 1746, Captain Philip Alexander II (1704–1753) moved to what is south of present Duke Street in Alexandria. His estate, which consisted of 500 acres (2.0 km^{2}), was bounded by Hunting Creek, Hooff's Run, the Potomac River, and approximately the line which would become Cameron Street. At the opening of Virginia's 1748–49 legislative session, there was a petition submitted in the House of Burgesses on November 1, 1748, that the "inhabitants of Fairfax (Co.) praying that a town may be established at Hunting Creek Warehouse on Potowmack River," as Hugh West was the owner of the warehouse. The petition was introduced by Lawrence Washington (1718-1752), the representative for Fairfax County and, more importantly, the son-in-law of William Fairfax and a founding member of the Ohio Company. To support the Company's push for a town on the river, Lawrence's younger brother George Washington, an aspiring surveyor, made a sketch of the shoreline touting the advantages of the tobacco warehouse site.

Since the river site was amidst his estate, Philip opposed the idea and strongly favored a site at the head of Hunting Creek (also known as Great Hunting Creek). It has been said that in order to avoid a predicament the petitioners offered to name the new town Alexandria, in honor of Philip's family. As a result, Philip and his cousin Captain John Alexander (1711–1763) gave land to assist in the development of Alexandria, and are thus listed as the founders. This John was the son of Robert Alexander II (1688–1735). On May 2, 1749, the House of Burgesses approved the river location and ordered "Mr. Washington do go up with a Message to the Council and acquaint them that this House have agreed to the Amendments titled An Act for erecting a Town at Hunting Creek Warehouse, in the County of Fairfax." A "Public Vendue" (auction) was advertised for July, and the county surveyor laid out street lanes and town lots. The auction was conducted on July 13–14, 1749. Almost immediately upon establishment, the town founders called the new town "Belhaven", believed to be in honor of a Scottish patriot, John Hamilton, 2nd Lord Belhaven and Stenton, the Northern Neck tobacco trade being then dominated by Scots. The name Belhaven was used in official lotteries to raise money for a Church and Market House, but it was never approved by the legislature and fell out of favor in the mid-1750s. The town of Alexandria did not become incorporated until 1779.

In 1755, General Edward Braddock organized his fatal expedition against Fort Duquesne at Carlyle House in Alexandria. In April 1755, the governors of Virginia, and the Provinces of Maryland, Pennsylvania, Massachusetts, and New York met to determine upon concerted action against the French in America.

In March 1785, commissioners from Virginia and Maryland met in Alexandria to discuss the commercial relations of the two states, finishing their business at Mount Vernon. The Mount Vernon Conference concluded on March 28 with an agreement for freedom of trade and freedom of navigation of the Potomac River. The Maryland legislature, in ratifying this agreement on November 22, proposed a conference among representatives from all the states to consider the adoption of definite commercial regulations. This led to the calling of the Annapolis Convention of 1786, which in turn led to the calling of the Federal Convention of 1787.

== District of Columbia ==
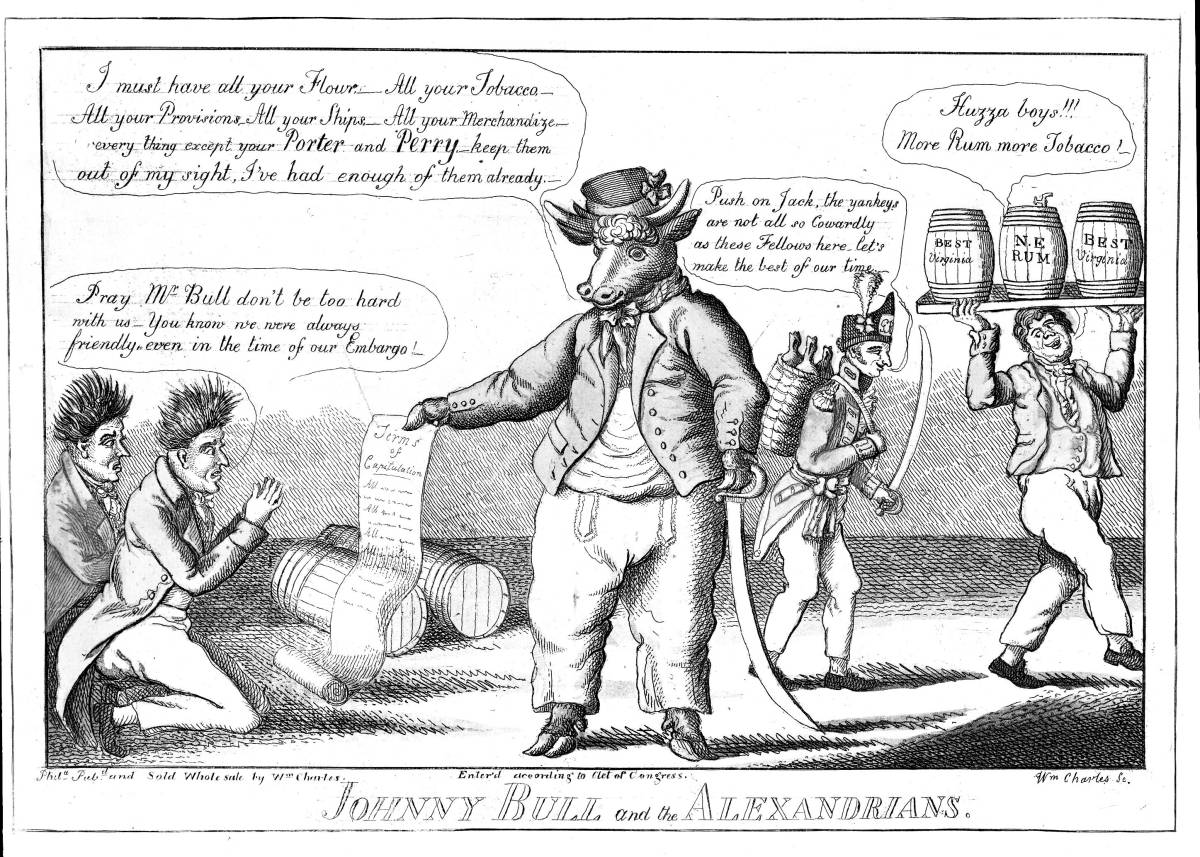
Johnny Bull and the Alexandrians (1814) by William Charles mocked Alexandria citizens (kneeling at left, with hair standing on end) for not putting up more resistance to the British.

In 1791, Alexandria was included in the area chosen by George Washington to become the District of Columbia. A portion of the City of Alexandria—known as "Old Town"—and all of today's Arlington County share the distinction of having been originally in Virginia, ceded to the U.S. Government to form the District of Columbia, and later retroceded to Virginia by the federal government in 1846, when the District was reduced in size to exclude the portion south of the Potomac River. The City of Alexandria was re-chartered in 1852.

In 1814, during the War of 1812, the British military carried out a successful raid on Alexandria, which surrendered without a fight. In order to avoid the town's destruction, twenty-two merchant ships and large quantities of flour, tobacco, cotton, wine, and sugar were handed over by Alexandria's municipal authorities to the British.

From 1828 to 1836, Alexandria was home to the Franklin & Armfield Slave Market, one of the largest slave trading companies in the country. By the 1830s, they were sending more than 1,000 slaves annually from Alexandria to their Natchez, Mississippi, and New Orleans markets to help meet the demand for slaves in Mississippi and surrounding states. Later owned by Price, Birch & Co., the slave pen became a jail under Union occupation.

== Return to Virginia ==
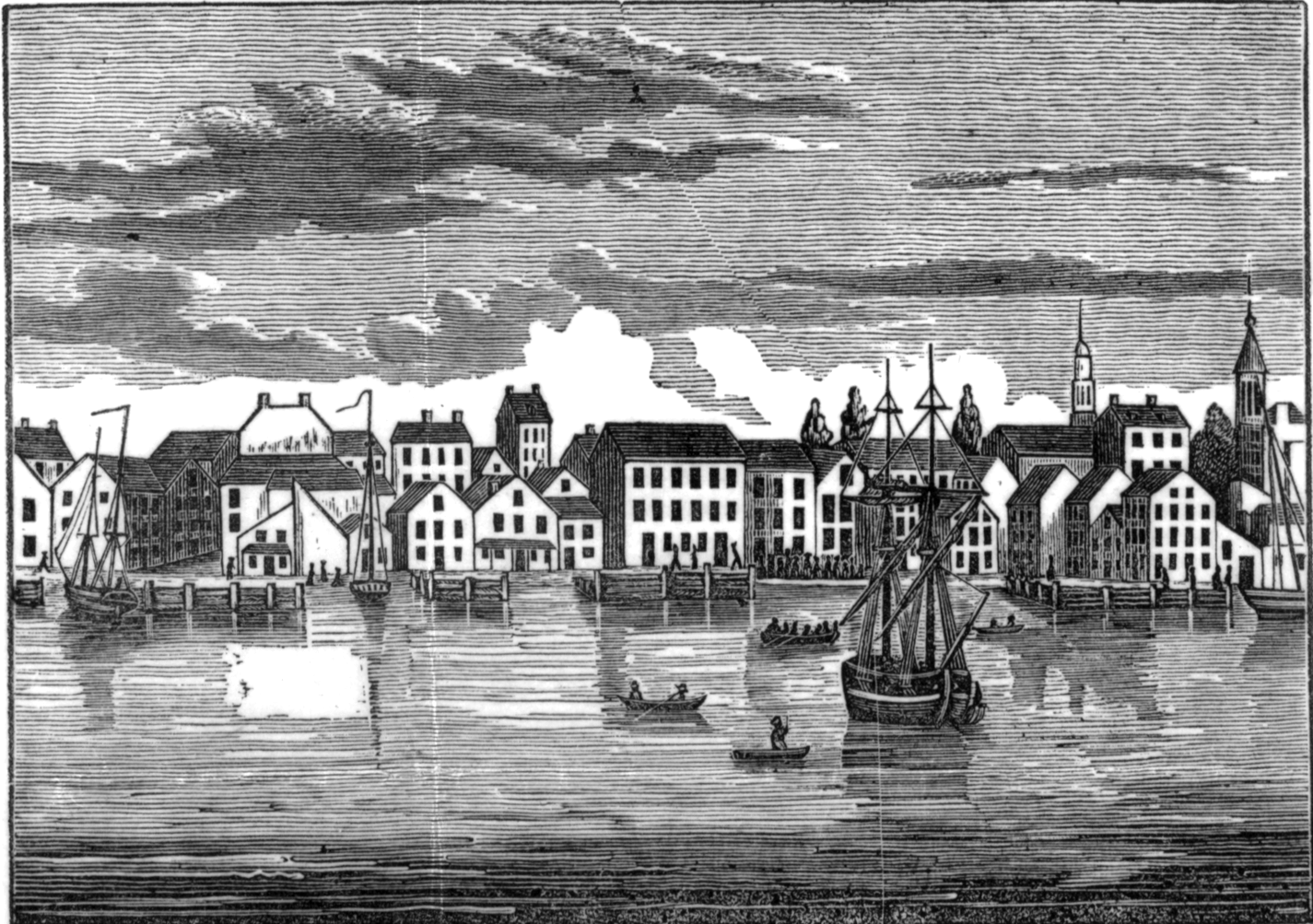
Slave ship taking on slaves at the Alexandria waterfront in 1836. Alexandria's slave trade made Virginia a more pro-slavery state after retrocession.

Over time, a movement grew to separate Alexandria from the District of Columbia. As competition grew with the port of Georgetown and the Chesapeake and Ohio Canal fostered development on the north side of the Potomac River, the city's economy stagnated. In addition, many in Alexandria hoped to benefit from land sales and increased business from the federal government, which had no need for the land south of the river at the time. Also, its residents had lost representation and the right to vote at any level of government.

Alexandria was also an important port and market in the slave trade, and there were increasing talk of the abolition of slavery in the national capital. Alexandria's economy would suffer greatly if slavery were outlawed. At the same time, there was an active abolition movement in Virginia, and the state's General Assembly was divided on the issue. Alexandria and Alexandria County would provide two new pro-slavery representatives.

After a referendum, voters petitioned Congress and Virginia to return the area to Virginia. Congress retroceded the area to Virginia on July 9, 1846. Ultimately, the City of Alexandria became independent of Alexandria County in 1870. The remaining portion of Alexandria County changed its name to Arlington County in 1920.

== American Civil War ==
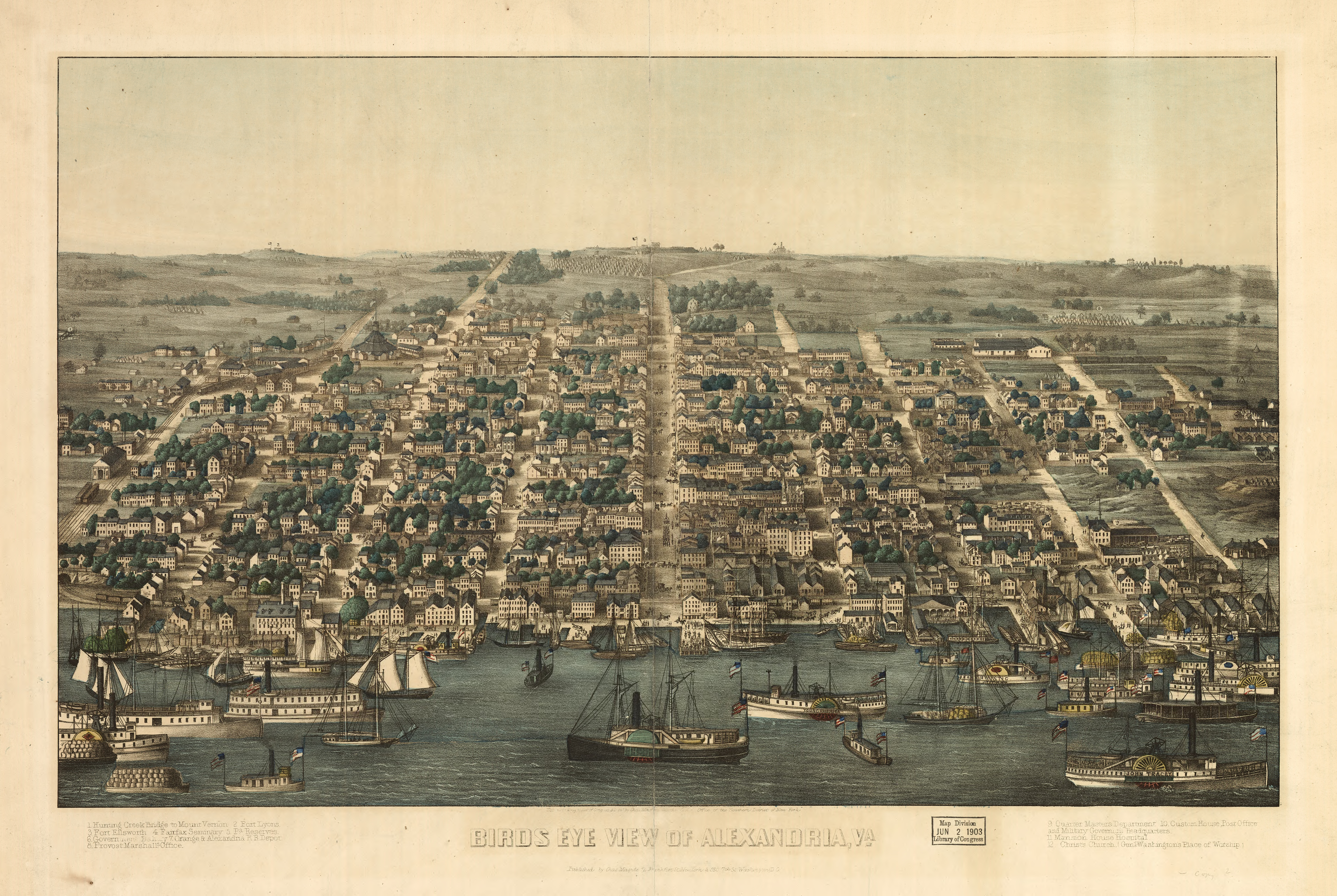
A bird's eye view of Alexandria from the Potomac in 1863. Fort Ellsworth is visible on the hill in the center background.

The first fatalities of the North and South in the American Civil War occurred in Alexandria. Within a month of the Battle of Fort Sumter, where two died, Union Army troops occupied Alexandria, landing troops at the base of King Street on the Potomac River on May 24, 1861. A few blocks up King Street from their landing site, the commander of the New York Fire Zouaves, Colonel Elmer E. Ellsworth, sortied with a small detachment to retrieve a large Confederate flag displayed on the roof of the Marshall House Inn that had been visible from the White House. While descending from the roof, Ellsworth was killed by James W. Jackson, the hotel proprietor. One of the soldiers in Ellsworth's party shot Jackson immediately thereafter.

Colonel Ellsworth was from Illinois and was a frequent visitor to the White House, where his death was much lamented. The incident generated excitement in both the Union and the Confederacy, where those loyal to each hailed Ellsworth or Jackson as a martyr to their respective cause.

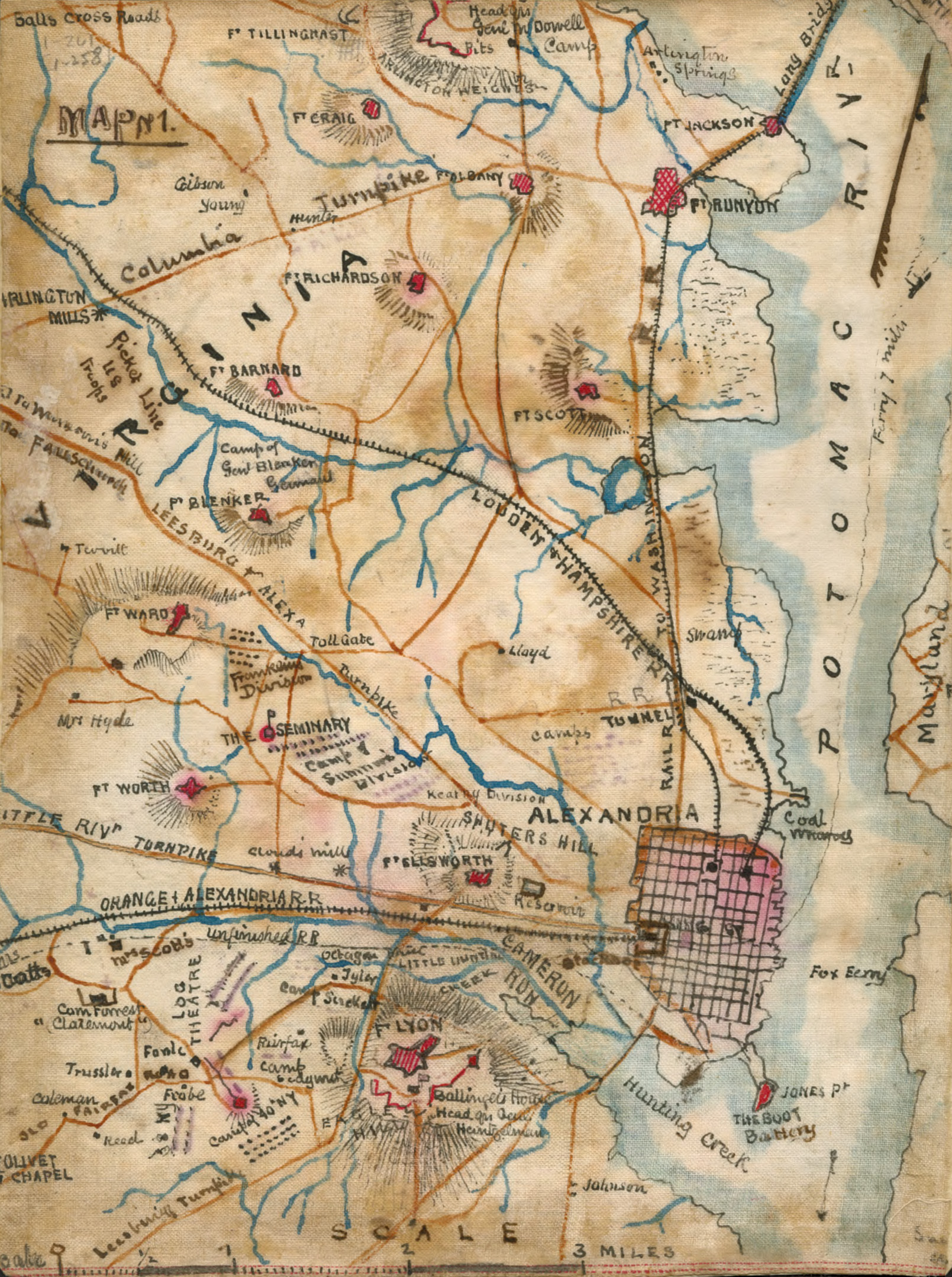
Map of Alexandria showing the forts that were constructed to defend Washington during the Civil War

Alexandria remained under military occupation until the end of the Civil War. One of the ring of forts built during the war by the Union army for the defense of Washington, D.C., Fort Ward, is located within the boundaries of modern Alexandria. After the establishment of the state of West Virginia in 1863 and until the close of the war, Alexandria was the seat of the Restored Government of Virginia also known as the "Alexandria Government."

During the Union occupation, a recurring point of contention between the Alexandria citizenry and the military occupiers was the military's periodic insistence that church services include prayers for the President of the United States. Because the Episcopal Church used a written prayer book service that made distinct mention of both the executive and the legislative departments of the government, Episcopal clergy were exposed to particular embarrassment whenever any part of the territory of the Confederate States was occupied by Union forces.

Alexandria's St. Paul's Episcopal Church was the site of an early and particularly notorious incident. The interim minister at St. Paul's Church, the Rev. Dr. K. J. Stewart, was arrested in the sanctuary on February 9, 1862, by Union troops who had attended with the stated purpose of provoking an incident. During the Litany, Dr. Stewart was ordered by an attending Union officer to say the Prayer for the President of the United States that Dr. Stewart had omitted without saying any other prayer in its place. Dr. Stewart proceeded without paying any attention to the interruption; but a captain and six of his soldiers, who were present in the congregation with intent to provoke an incident, drew their swords and pistols, strode into the chancel, seized the clergyman while he was still kneeling, held pistols to his head, and forced him out of the church, and through the streets, just as he was, in his surplice and stole, and committed him to the guard-house of the 8th Illinois Cavalry. Dr. Stewart was soon released, but was not allowed to continue to officiate at services.

The day after the Alexandria Gazette reported the incident in detail, its offices were set afire. The St. Paul's sanctuary was thereafter closed for the duration of the war and its vestry records also were destroyed by a fire. For the duration of the war, the St. Paul's sanctuary was used by the Union army as a hospital for the wounded.

Buildings at Virginia Theological Seminary and at Episcopal High School also served as hospitals for union troops. Bullets, belt clips, and other artifacts from the Civil War have been found in those areas well into the 20th century. Christ Church, because of its association with George Washington, was not closed, but came under the control of army chaplains for the duration of the war.

For African American escaped slaves, the military occupation of Alexandria created opportunity on an unprecedented scale. As Federal troops extended their occupation of the seceded states, escaped slaves flooded into Union-controlled areas. Safely behind Union lines, the cities of Alexandria and Washington offered not only comparative freedom, but employment. Over the course of the war, Alexandria was transformed by the Union occupiers into a major supply depot and transport and hospital center, all under army control.

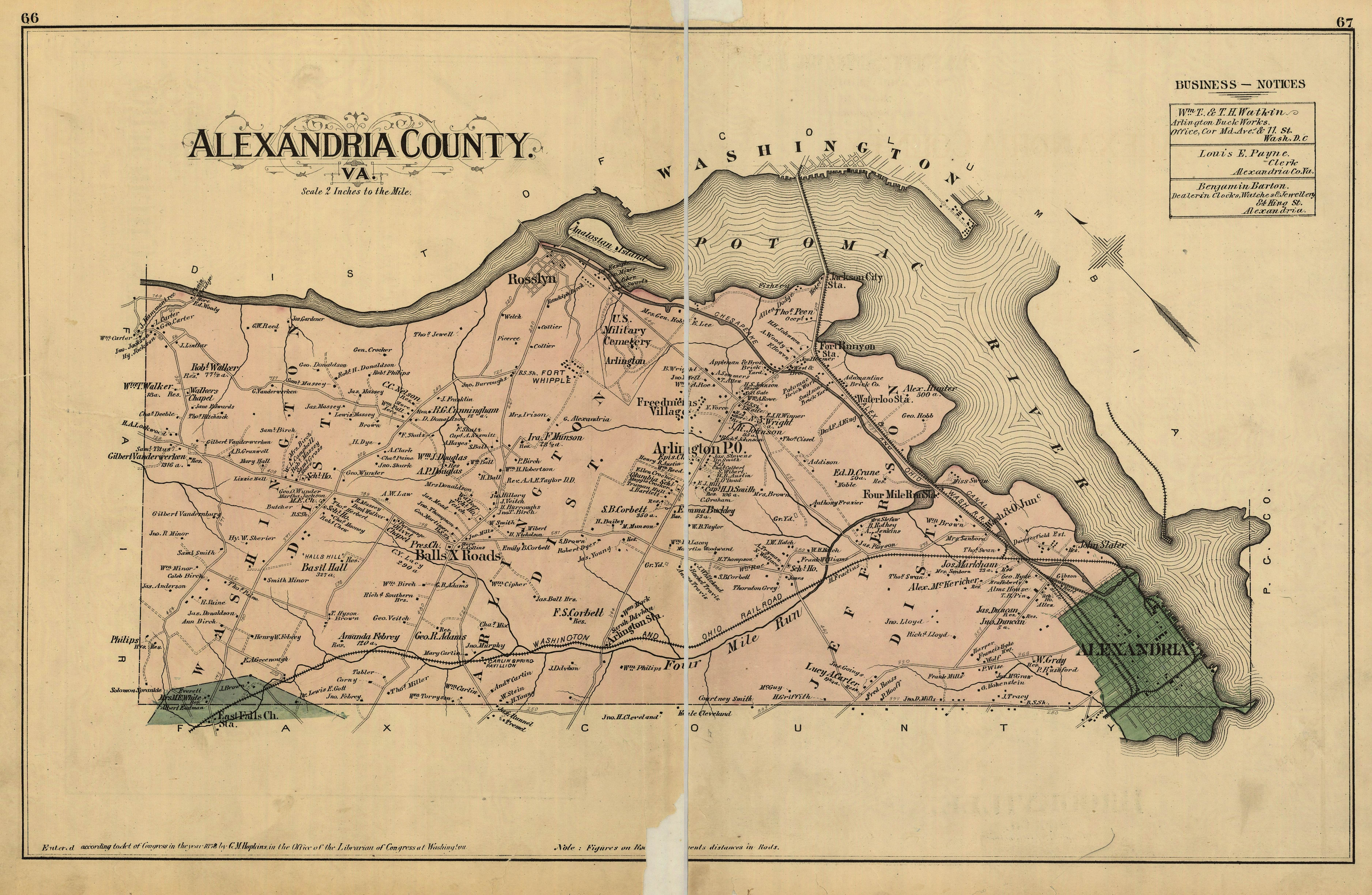
Map of Alexandria County (1878), including what is now Arlington County and the City of Alexandria. Map includes the names of property owners at that time. City boundaries roughly correspond with Old Town.

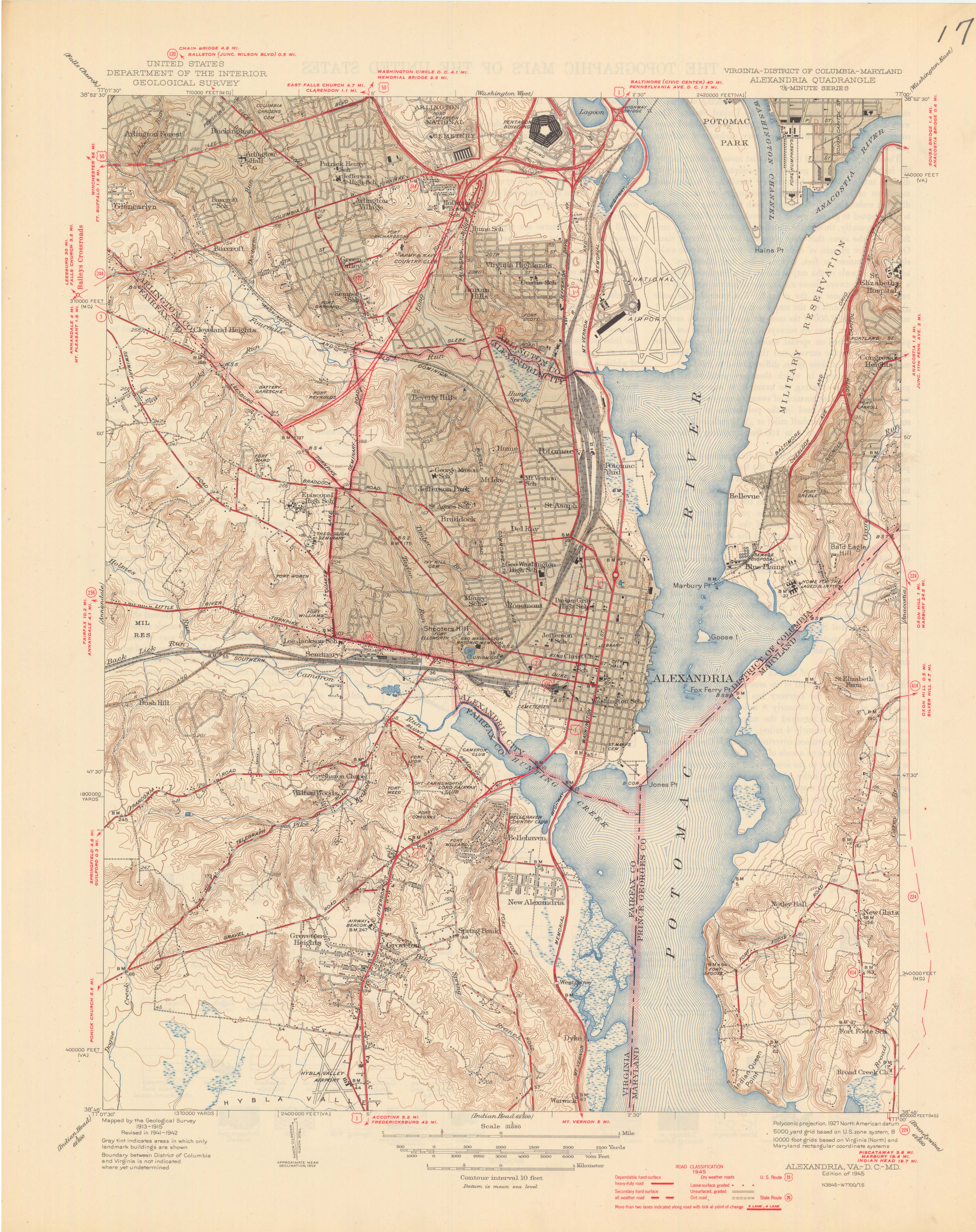
U.S. Geological Survey Map of the "Alexandria Quadrangle" (1945), including what is now the City of Alexandria and surrounding areas. At this time, the City of Alexandria was bounded on the west by Seminary and Quaker Roads, on the north by Four Mile Run and on the south by Little River Turnpike/Duke Street and Hunting Creek.

Because the escaped slaves were still legally property until the abolition of slavery, they were labeled as contrabands to prevent their being returned to their masters. Contrabands took positions with the army as construction workers, nurses and hospital stewards, longshoremen, painters, wood cutters, teamsters, laundresses, cooks, gravediggers, personal servants, and ultimately as soldiers and sailors. According to one statistic, the population of Alexandria had exploded to 18,000 by the fall of 1863 – an increase of 10,000 people in 16 months.

As of ratification of the Fifteenth Amendment, Alexandria County's black population was more than 8,700, or about half the total number of residents in the County. This newly enfranchised constituency provided the support necessary to elect the first black Alexandrians to the City Council and the Virginia Legislature.

The population of contrabands flooding into Alexandria during the Union occupation included many who were destitute, malnourished and in poor health. Once in Alexandria, the contrabands were housed in barracks and hastily assembled shantytowns. In the close quarters with poor sanitation, smallpox and typhoid outbreaks were prevalent and death was common. In February 1864, after hundreds of contrabands and freedmen had perished, the commander of the Alexandria military district, General John P. Slough, seized a parcel of undeveloped land at the corner of South Washington and Church Streets from a pro-Confederate owner to be used as a cemetery specifically for burial of contrabands. Burials started in March that year.

The cemetery operated under General Slough's command. Its oversight was supervised by Alexandria's Superintendent of Contrabands, the Rev. Albert Gladwin, who made arrangements for burials. Each grave was identified with a whitewashed, wooden grave marker. In 1868, after Congress ended most functions of the Freedmen's Bureau, the cemetery was closed; and the property was returned to its original owners. Eventually, after the grave markers had rotted and ownership had transferred several times, the property was redeveloped for commercial use. During its five years of operation, about 1800 contrabands and freedmen were buried in the cemetery.

Beginning in 1987, when memory of the cemetery was revived, the City of Alexandria began the process of saving the cemetery to create a memorial park. During 2008, submissions in a design competition for the memorial were received from 20 countries, and a design for the memorial was selected. As of late 2008, construction of the memorial was underway. As Contrabands and Freedmen Cemetery, the cemetery was listed on the U.S. National Register of Historic Places in August, 2012.

== 20th century ==
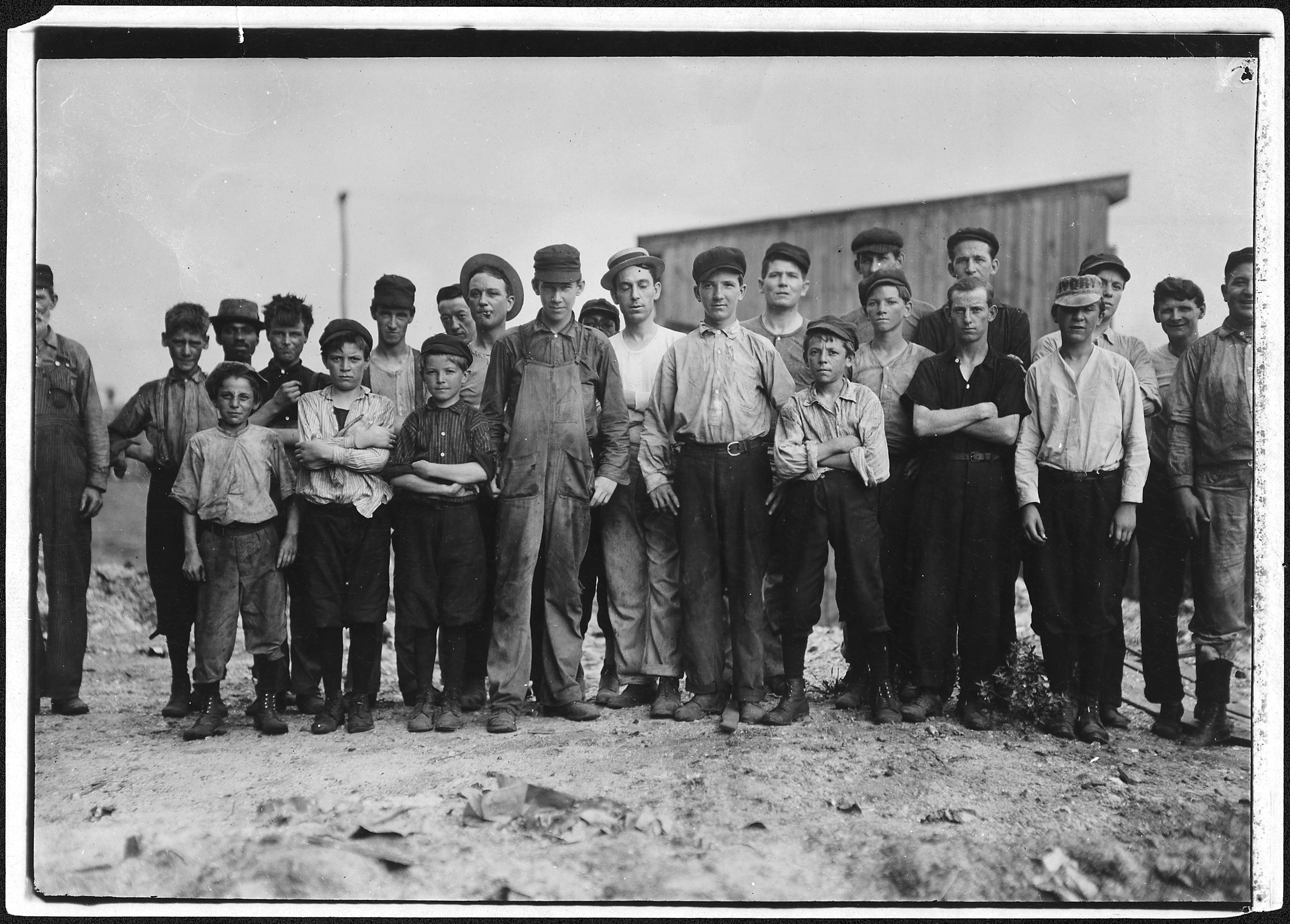
Child laborers working at a glass factory in Alexandria, 1911. Photo by Lewis Hine.

At the turn of the 20th century, the most common production in the city was glass, fertilizer, beer and leather. The glass often went into beer bottles. Much of the Virginia Glass Company effort went to supply the demands of the Robert Portner Brewing Company, until fire destroyed the St. Asaph Street plant on February 18, 1905. The Old Dominion Glass Company also had a glass works fall to fire, then built a new one. The Belle Pre Bottle Company held a monopoly on a milk bottle that they patented, yet that organization only lasted 10 years. Most businesses were smaller where the business occupied the first floor of a building and the owner and family lived above. Prohibition closed Portner Brewing in 1916. Work towards women's suffrage was contributed to by a Women's Citizens League in the city.

In early 1918, the Virginia Shipbuilding Corporation began construction on a shipyard on Jones Point in Alexandria, Virginia. In contract with the Emergency Fleet Corporation, the yard was expected to produce 12 steel ships for the U.S. World War I effort. The opening of the shipyard brought many people to Alexandria which inspired city improvements. President Woodrow Wilson visited the Virginia Shipbuilding Corporation on May 30, 1918 to drive the first rivet into the keel of the SS Gunston Hall. In 1930 Alexandria annexed the town adjacent to Potomac Yard incorporated in 1908 named Potomac. In 1938 the Mt. Vernon Drive-In cinema opened. In 1939 the segregated public library experienced a sit-in organized by Samuel Wilbert Tucker. In 1940, both the Robert Robinson Library, which is now the Alexandria Black History Museum, and the Vernon Theatre opened Jim Morrison of The Doors as well as Cass Elliot and John Phillips of The Mamas & The Papas attended the George Washington High School in the 1950s.

In 1955, then-congressman and future president Gerald R. Ford and his family moved to Alexandria from Georgetown. The Fords remained in their Alexandria home during Ford's tenure as vice president of the United States (1973–1974), as the vice president did not yet have an official residence. Following the resignation of Richard Nixon, Ford spent his first 10 days as President in the house before moving to the White House.

In March 1959, Lieutenant Colonel William Henry Whalen, the "highest-ranking American ever recruited as a mole by the Russian Intelligence Service," provided Colonel Sergei A. Edemski three classified Army manuals in exchange for $3,500 at a shopping center parking lot within the city. Agents of the Federal Bureau of Investigation later arrested Whalen on July 12, 1966 at his home in the city. In 1961, the Woodrow Wilson Bridge opened.

In 1965, the city integrated schools. In 1971, the city consolidated all high school students into T. C. Williams High School. The same year, that head coach Herman Boone joined the school and lead the football team to at 13–0 season, state championship, and national championship runner-up; the basis for the 2000 film Remember the Titans were Boone was portrayed by Denzel Washington. In 1969 and 1976, Pope John Paul II visited Alexandria when he was known as Karol Cardinal Wojtyła. He was guided by a Polish Catholic priest from St. Mary's Catholic Church in Alexandria. In 1972 Clifford T. Cline purchased the 1890 Victorian house at 219 King Street and converted it into the Creole serving Two-Nineteen Restaurant. In 1973 Nora Lamborne and Beverly Beidler became the first women elected to the city council. In 1974 the Torpedo Factory Art Center opened. In 1983, the King Street–Old Town Station and Eisenhower Avenue Station both opened. In 1984 the Islamic Saudi Academy opened. and Parker-Gray historic district In 1991, Patricia Ticer became the first women elected mayor. In 1999 the city celebrated its 250th anniversary. Also in 1999, Dave Grohl, a native of Northern Virginia, returned from Los Angeles to live and record with his band Foo Fighters who recorded their Grammy-winning album There Is Nothing Left to Lose in Grohl's home basement studio in the city's North Ridge neighborhood.

== 21st century ==
The 2011 Foo Fighters album Wasting Light featured the track "Arlandria" named for a section of the city where Grohl once lived. In 2014, legislation was introduced in the city council to repeal the 1963 law that requires new north–south streets to carry the name of a Confederate military leader.

In November 2020, the school board announced that T. C. Williams High School was going to be renamed after a number attempts due to T. C. Williams' pro-segregationist views and in 2021 it was renamed to Alexandria City High School.

== See also ==
- Timeline of Alexandria, Virginia
- List of mayors of Alexandria, Virginia
