= David Arell =

American military officer, judge, and politician (1750–1793)

Mayor of Alexandria, Virginia
- In office April 1786 – 1786
- Preceded by: James Kirk
- Succeeded by: John Fitzgerald

Personal details
- Born: c. 1750 Pennsylvania; British America
- Died: c. 1793 (aged 42–43) Alexandria, Virginia, U.S.
- Spouse: Phoebe Caverly
- Children: 2

Military service
- Allegiance: United States
- Branch/service: Continental Army
- Years of service: 1775–1778
- Rank: Captain

David Arell (c. 1750 – c. 1793) was a Revolutionary War officer, politician, and judge. Arell served as mayor of Alexandria in 1786 and was a longtime acquaintance and personal attorney of George Washington.

== Early life and family ==
David Arell was born around 1750 in Philadelphia, Pennsylvania, the son of Richard Arell (a merchant). By the early 1770s, Arell's family had moved to Alexandria. He became acquainted with George Washington as early at April 1773, and is included in his diary entries.

On May 12, 1785, Arell married Phoebe Caverly in Fairfax County, Virginia. They had two children, Richard and Christina. In 1790, Arell petitioned for a divorce from his wife due to her alleged infidelity, with court documents referring to her as "practically a prostitute."

== American Revolutionary War ==
During the American Revolution, Arell served as a lieutenant and later captain of Company No. 2 in the 3rd Virginia Regiment, Alexandria's "Independent Blues" militia. He resigned from the army in February 1778 to return to his law practice.

== Career ==
Arell practiced law in Alexandria. He also served as justice of the Hustings Court. Arell was active in real estate and had several property and land holdings in Alexandria and Fredericksburg. Arell was granted 4,000 acres of land by the Virginia General Assembly.

In 1780, George Washington sought Arell's advice and legal representation during a legal dispute. In the same year, Arell was selected as one of the first trustees and council members of Alexandria. Additionally, in the early 1780s, Arell helped to raise funds to support Washington College.

Beginning in April 1786, Arell briefly served as the mayor of Alexandria following the death of incumbent mayor James Kirk. He was also an active member of the Masonic lodge in Alexandria (now Alexandria-Washington Lodge No. 22).

== Death and legacy ==
Arell died around 1793. He is buried at the Old Presbyterian Meeting House in Alexandria.

Arell's Alexandria home is located at 219 South Lee Street. "Arell Court" is a street in Alexandria.
