= Philip Marsteller =

American military leader and politician

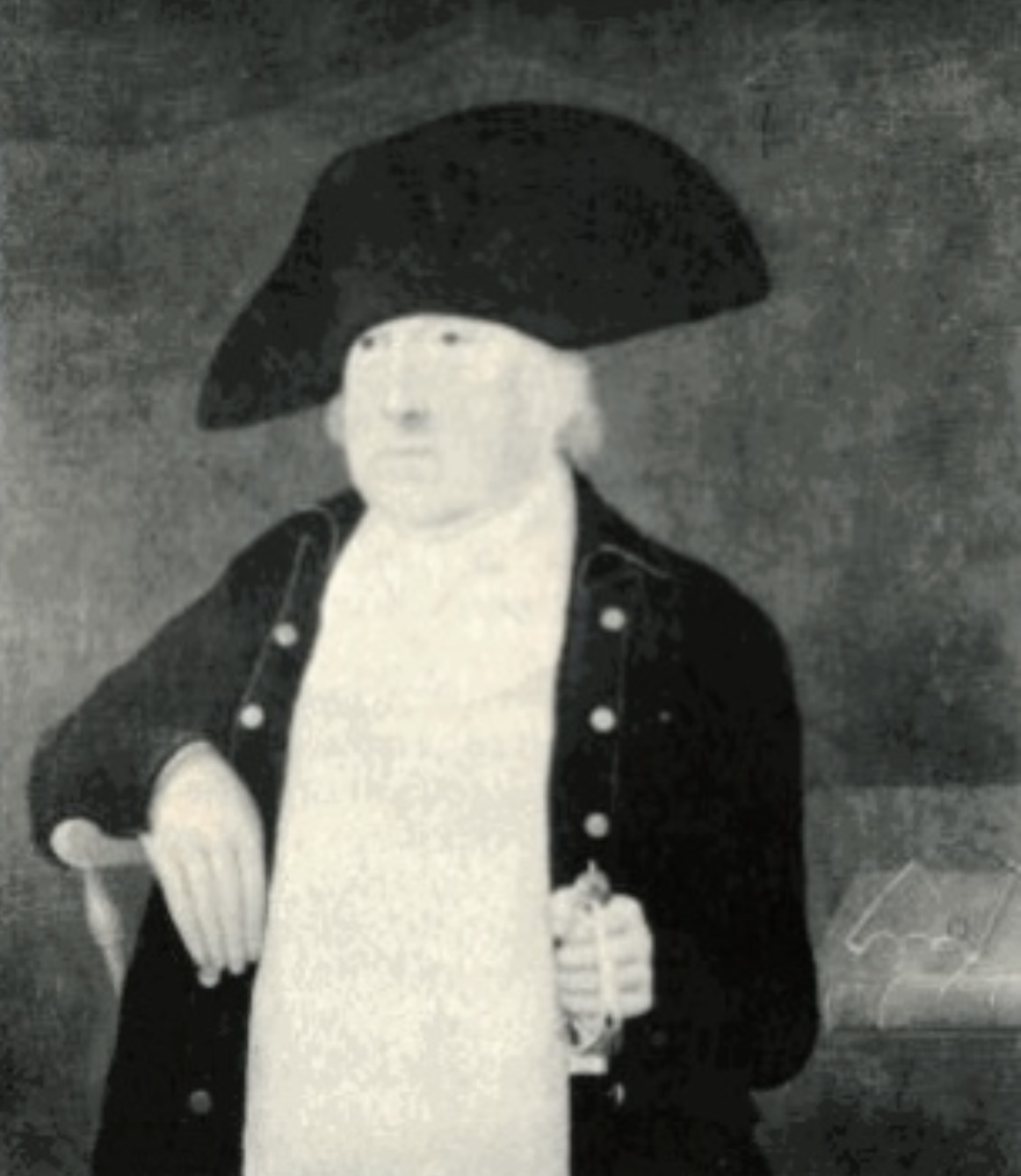
- Painting of Col. Marsteller by Jacob Frymire c. 1800

Mayor of Alexandria, Virginia
- In office 1791–1792
- Preceded by: William Hunter Jr.
- Succeeded by: Jesse Taylor

Personal details
- Born: 1741 Pennsylvania; British America
- Died: December 1803 (aged 61–62) Alexandria, Virginia, US

Military service
- Allegiance: United States
- Branch/service: Continental Army
- Years of service: 1776–1783
- Rank: Lt. Colonel
- Battles/wars: American Revolutionary War; Forage War

Philip Marsteller (1741 – December 1803) was a Revolutionary War officer, businessman, and politician. A friend of George Washington, Marsteller served as mayor of Alexandria and as a pallbearer in Washington's funeral.

== Early life ==
Philip Balthasar Marsteller was born in 1742 in Montgomery County, Pennsylvania, the son of German immigrants Frederick Ludwig Marsteller and his wife, Anna Barbara, both from Pfungstadt, Hesse. When he was 21, he purchased land in Millcreek Township where he lived for several years. In 1773, he was a founding member of the Cedar Fire Company in Lebanon, Pennsylvania.

In 1766, he married Magdalena Reiss. In 1770, they had one son, Phillip Godhelps Marsteller.

== American Revolutionary War ==
During the Revolutionary War, Marsteller was highly involved in the cause of securing American independence from Great Britain.

In 1776, Marsteller attended the Pennsylvania Constitutional Convention and assisted in recruitment of troops. During the war, he served as a lieutenant colonel in the 1st Battalion of the Lancaster County Militia and held other war-time posts including paymaster, purchasing agent, and as a militia leader during the Forage War.

== Political career ==
After the Revolutionary War, Marsteller and his family moved to Alexandria, Virginia. He and his son opened an auction and merchant business, and included George Washington among their clients. He also rented Washington's Alexandria townhome and lived there in the 1790s.

Marsteller was elected as Mayor of Alexandria, serving a term from 1791 to 1792.

=== Friendship with George Washington ===
Marsteller and George Washington were close friends and conducted business together for many years. Marsteller assisted Washington in acquiring services and goods for his Mount Vernon estate, including indentured servants and household supplies.

After Washington's death in 1799, Marsteller served as one of the honorary pallbearers during his funeral. He was later bequeathed a pair of dueling pistols by Washington's estate, which are now on display at the West Point Museum.

== Death and legacy ==
Marsteller died in December 1803 at his Alexandria home and was interred at Christ Church Cemetery in Alexandria.
