= J. Hall Pleasants =

American physician

Jacob Hall Pleasants (1873–1957) was an art historian and genealogist who researched and wrote about people of Maryland and especially Baltimore. Most notably he wrote scholarly articles and books about painters and silversmiths in Maryland, and early American artists such as the African-American portrait artist Joshua Johnson and landscape painter Francis Guy which led to exhibitions and more scholarship about these artists.

== Biography ==
Pleasants was born September 12, 1873, near Towson, Maryland. Richard Hall Pleasants and Elizabeth Moale (Poultney) Pleasants were his parents. In 1899 Pleasants received a medical degree from Johns Hopkins University. He practiced medicine in Baltimore, and taught medical diagnosis at Johns Hopkins from 1900 to 1935. He had a slight case of tuberculosis and the study of this disease did become a focus for him. He was a member of the Maryland Tuberculosis Sanatorium Commission. He left that role in 1921.

Outside of medicine, he was also a scholar of local history, and fine arts. During his life he served as a trustee for the Baltimore Museum of Art, the Gilmor Country School, Johns Hopkins University, the Peabody Institute, the Peale Museum, and the corresponding secretary and the vice president of the Maryland Historical Society over the course of 23 years, starting in 1898. He also served as the president of the Supervisors of City Charities in Baltimore from 1904 to 1921.

In 1924 Pleasants started working with the Frick Art Reference Library and helped the library research and identify paintings to photograph in and around Baltimore. Pleasants was an important contact for the Library and provided them with information on thousands of Maryland paintings and miniatures. over the course of 33 years.

In 1902, Pleasants and Delia Tudor Wilmer, daughter of Skipwith Wilmer, were married. They had three children together.

== Publications ==
Pleasants wrote and edited several books and articles including:

- The Curzon Family of New York and Baltimore (1919)
- Maryland Silversmiths, 1715–1830, (1930) with Howard Sill
- Archives of Maryland, Volume LV, Proceedings and Acts of the General Assembly of Maryland, 1757–1758 (25). Pleasants, J. Hall, Editor. [Published by Authority of the State under the Direction of the Maryland Historical Society.] (1938)
- An Early Baltimore Negro Portrait Painter, Joshua Johnson, (1939)
- Four Late Eighteenth-Century Anglo-American Landscape Painters (1943)
- Two Hundred and Fifty Years of Painting in Maryland (1945)
- “George William West : A Baltimore Student of Benjamin West.” Art in America, vol. 37, Jan. 1949, pp. 7–15.
- “Francis Guy : A Painter of Gentlemen’s Estates.” Antiques, vol. 65, Jan. 1954, pp. 288–290
- Pleasants compiled the Pleasants File, a file on paintings existing in Maryland during the 1920s and 1930s
