= E. E. Downham =

American politician and businessman (1839–1921)

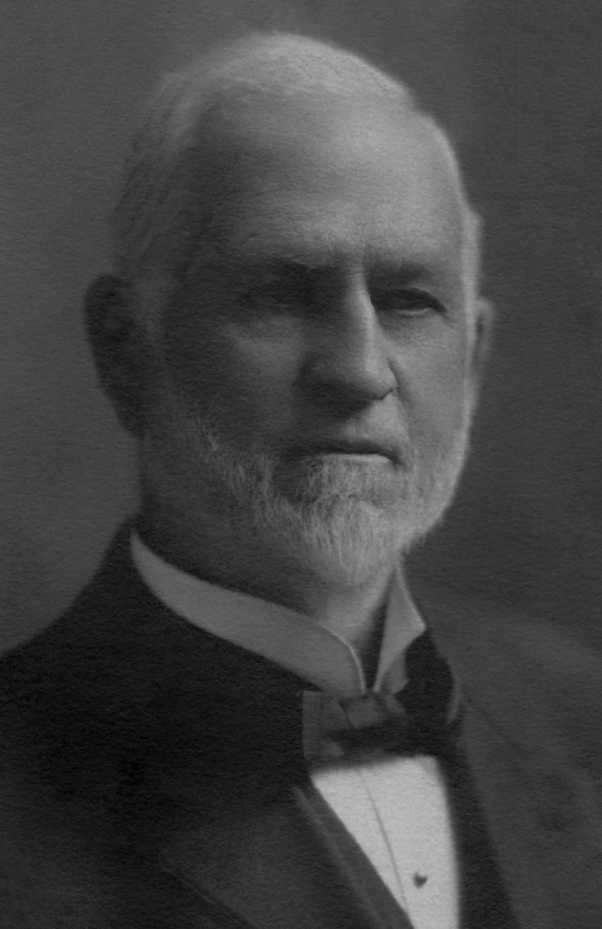
- Downham c. 1890s

Mayor of Alexandria, Virginia
- In office 1887–1891
- Preceded by: John B. Smoot
- Succeeded by: Henry Strauss

Personal details
- Born: Emanuel Ethelbert Downham; March 23, 1839 Bridgeton, New Jersey, U.S.
- Died: September 17, 1921 (aged 82) Alexandria, Virginia, U.S.
- Resting place: Presbyterian Cemetery, Alexandria, Virginia
- Party: Democratic
- Spouse: Sarah Miranda Price
- Children: 6
- Profession: Politician, businessman, miner

Emanuel Ethelbert Downham (March 23, 1839 – September 17, 1921), known by his initials E.E., was an American businessman, miner, and politician who was mayor of Alexandria, Virginia, from 1887 to 1891. He was a prominent leading member of the Masonic Fraternity in Virginia, and helped in the development and raising funds for the George Washington Masonic National Memorial. He died in 1921.

== Biography ==
=== Early life ===
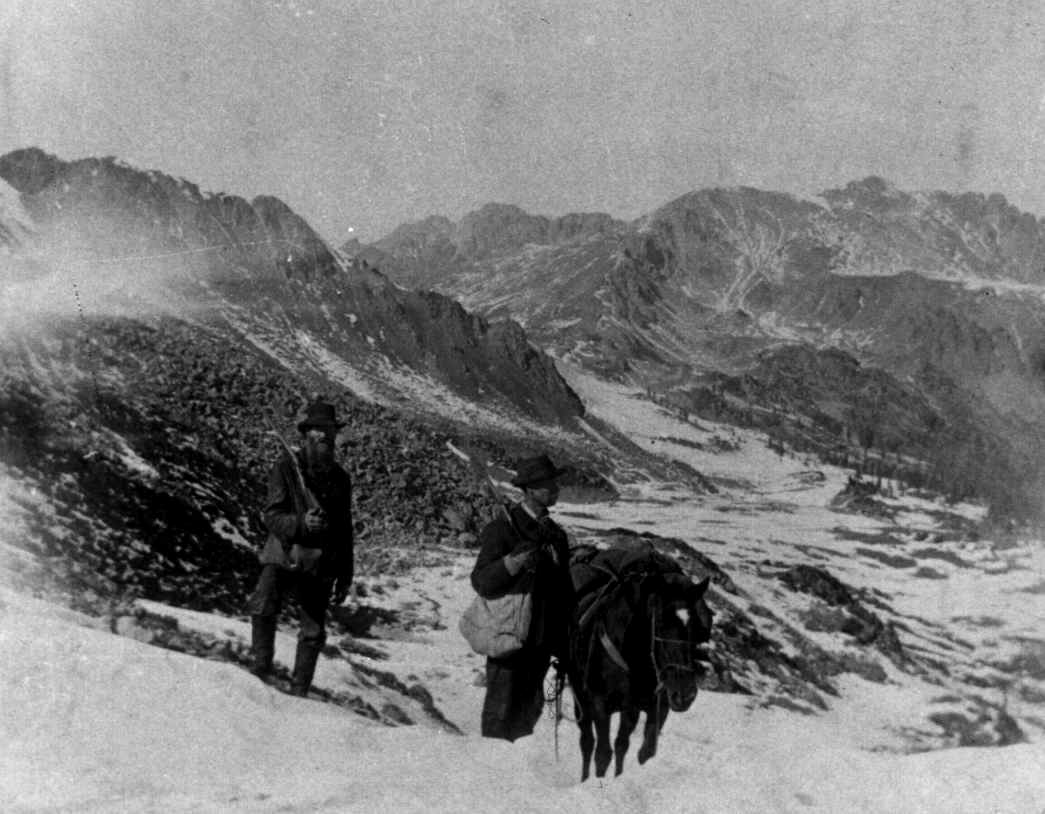
Gold prospectors in the Rocky Mountains of western Kansas Territory during the gold rush

Downham was born March 23, 1839, in Bridgeton, New Jersey, the son of Emanuel Downham, and his wife Eleanor (née Sockwell). He was a descendant of Thomas Downham, who had settled in Delaware by 1705. He, along with his younger sister Rachel, were orphaned at a young age, and they grew up in the care of their cousin Lorenzo D. Lore. In his youth, he went west as a Fifty-Niner during the Pike's Peak gold rush in the then Kansas Territory. He was among the earliest miners, and settlers in the area. After a period in the territory, he returned to New Jersey in 1861, and started and operated a hotel with a cousin. Later he moved to Alexandria, Virginia at the onset of the Civil War, where he would spend the rest of his life, to start a grocery, and later liquor business.

=== Career ===
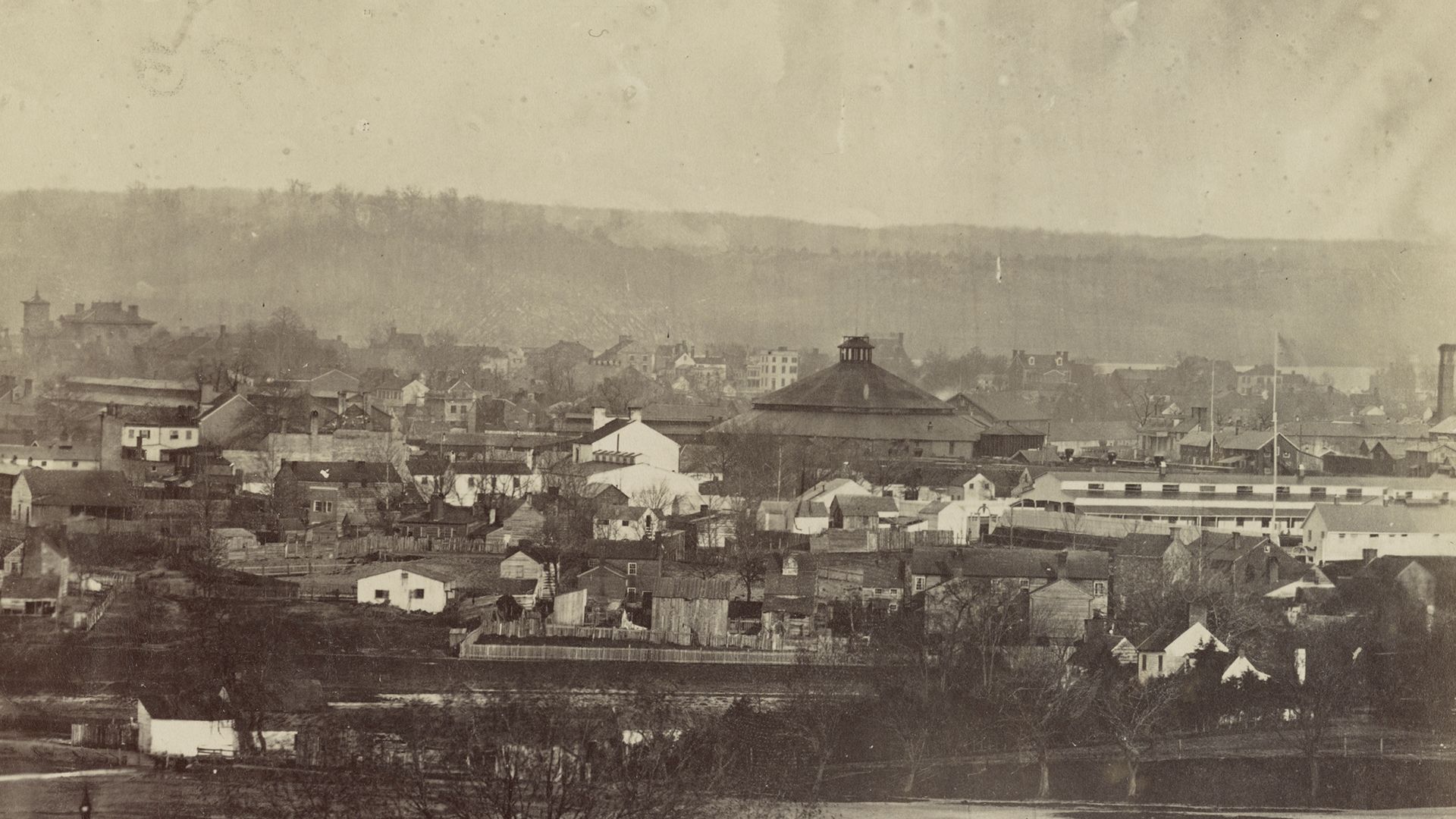
Alexandria in 1862, the 'Crossroads of the Civil War', the year Downham moved to the city

After moving to Alexandria in 1862, Downham decided not to directly join the war effort, and instead focused on the development of a grocery, and later alcohol business. A prominent War Democrat in the area, he sold liquor and important commodities to Union soldiers and officials during the war. In 1869, he was involved in a legal dispute with the city of Alexandria, which reached the Supreme Court and was decided in Downham v. Alexandria. This case became a legal precedent and is cited to the present day.

During his time in Virginia, Downham was initiated into the Andrew Jackson Masonic Lodge of Alexandria, and he later served as the Grand Master of the Lodge from 1880 to 1881. He would also go onto to be initiated into the Knights Templar, a Christian oriented order of Freemasonry.

Later in his career, he entered into local politics. In 1874, he was elected to the Alexandria City Council, and upon the death of mayor, John B. Smoot, in 1887, he was elected by the council to fill out his term. His tenure proved very popular amongst the population due to his efforts to improve city infrastructure and civic life within the city. He was elected outright in 1888, serving with distinction until 1891, before retiring from public office.

=== Family ===
Downham married Sarah Miranda Price, the daughter of a prominent local merchant, on November 16, 1865. Together they had six children, five of which lived into adulthood. All of his surviving sons followed him into local politics and business.

- Henry A. "Harry" Downham (b. 1867 - d. 1918)
- Emanuel Francis "Frank" Downham (b. 1869 – d. 1950)
- Horace English Downham I (b. 1871 – d. 1872)
- Horace English Downham II (b. 1874 – d. 1902)
- Robert Forsythe "Bob" Downham (b. 1876 - d. 1956)
- Sarah Maude Downham (b. 1877 - d. 1964)

His son, Robert Forsythe Downham, bought the Lee–Fendall House in 1903. The museum contains several photos of the Downham family. In 1914, the Downham family hosted President Woodrow Wilson for a reception following that year's George Washington Birthday Parade. The house was kept in the Downham name until 1937.

Downham along with his sons Robert, and Harry, were prominent Freemasons, and patrons in Virginia. They were involved with the Friendship Fire Association, and played crucial role's in the raising of funds for the George Washington Masonic National Memorial.

Another son, Horace English Downham, along with his company, was involved with mining operations in Arizona, and Mexico in the 1890s, through the 1900s.

== Death ==
Downham died on September 17, 1921, at the age of 82, after a five-month illness. He was buried on September 20th, in The Presbyterian Cemetery in Alexandria.
