= Kosciusko Kemper =

American politician

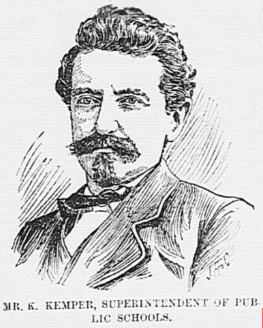

Mayor of Alexandria, Virginia
- In office 1877–1878
- Preceded by: J.B. Johnson
- Succeeded by: Courtland H. Smith
- In office 1874–1876
- Preceded by: William Norris Berkley
- Succeeded by: J.B. Johnson

Personal details
- Born: June 18, 1835 Warrenton, Virginia, U.S.
- Died: January 26, 1910 (aged 74) Washington, D.C., U.S.
- Profession: Politician, lawyer, military officer

Kosciusko Kemper (June 18, 1835 – January 26, 1910) was a Confederate officer during the American Civil War, lawyer, and American politician, serving in post-war offices including Superintendent of Alexandria Public Schools and Mayor of Alexandria, Virginia.

== Family and childhood ==
=== Early life ===
Kemper was born on June 18, 1835, in Warrenton, Virginia, the son of William and Sarah Kemper. Kemper was likely named after Tadeusz Kościuszko, the American Revolutionary War officer.

His father William was a professor and the former chairman of the board of visitors of the University of Virginia. Kemper was educated at his father's private boarding school and later attended the University of Virginia, graduating with a law degree.

=== Marriage and children ===
In February 1859, Kemper married Ira Etta Garrett. They had seven children, including:

- Edward Hudson Kemper (b. 1866)
- William Garrett Kemper (b. 1868 – d.1869)
- Sarah Richards Kemper (b. 1869 – d. 1940)
- Charlotte Kemper (b. 1871 – d. 1873)
- Eliza Garrett Kemper (b. 1874)
- Lewis Magnus Kemper (b. 1876)
- Kosciusko Kemper Jr. (b. 1877 – d. 1929)

== Career ==
=== Military ===
In 1861, Kemper enlisted in the Confederate States Army during the Civil War, attaining the ranks of first lieutenant and captain. Kemper was influential in the Battle of Fort Sumter, which began the Civil War. He was commended by General P.G.T. Beauregard in his dispatches to the Confederate States Secretary of War, where he wrote, "Too much praise cannot be bestowed on [his] zeal and energy."

Kemper served in additional military posts, including as assistant quartermaster and paymaster for the Richmond military hospitals from 1862 to 1865.

=== Law and politics ===
After the Civil War, Kemper moved to Alexandria, Virginia where he practiced law and served as a notary. He also served as president of the Alexandria Academy, a school for women. Kemper was a practicing attorney in Virginia for 32 years.

Kemper later was elected as Mayor of Alexandria, serving three terms from 1874 to 76 and 1877 to 1878. After serving as Mayor, Kemper was appointed as Alexandria's City Attorney from 1879 to 1883. From 1885 to 1889, Kemper served as private secretary on the staff of Joseph E. Johnston, a commissioner of railroads in the Grover Cleveland administration.

Kemper was elected as Superintendent of Alexandria Public Schools, serving from 1893 to 1909. During this period, he was involved as a founding member of the Historic Alexandria Preservation Society.

Kemper was an active Mason, serving from 1888 to 1890 as the Grand Master of the Washington-Alexandria Lodge. In 1906, Kemper served as the Grand Master of the Grand Lodge of Virginia, one of the oldest independent masonic grand lodges in the United States.

== Death ==
Kemper died on January 26, 1910, in Washington, D.C., and is interred at the Saint Paul's Cemetery in Alexandria.
