= William M. McCarty =

American politician (1789 – 1863)

William Mason McCarty

Member of the U.S. House of Representatives from Virginia's 14 district
- In office January 25, 1840 – March 3, 1841
- Preceded by: Charles Fenton Mercer
- Succeeded by: Cuthbert Powell

Member of the Virginia Senate from the Fairfax and Loudoun Counties district
- In office December 6, 1830 – December 2, 1839
- Preceded by: Joshua Osborne
- Succeeded by: James McIlhaney

Secretary of the Florida Territory
- In office March 3, 1827 – 1830
- President: John Quincy Adams

Member of the Virginia Senate from the Fairfax and Loudoun Counties district
- In office December 1, 1823 – December 4, 1825
- Preceded by: William M. Fitzhugh
- Succeeded by: Joshua Osborne

Personal details
- Born: 1789 Cedar Grove plantation, Fairfax County, Virginia, U.S.
- Died: December 20, 1863 (aged 74) Richmond, Virginia, U.S.
- Resting place: Shockoe Hill Cemetery
- Spouse(s): Emily Rutger Mason (m.1816; died 1835), Mary Burwell (m.1811)
- Education: College of William and Mary

William Mason McCarty (ca. 1789 – December 20, 1863) was a Virginia lawyer, plantation owner, and politician who served in the United States House of Representatives and Virginia Senate, as well as Secretary of the Florida territory and Acting Governor in the absence of Territorial Governor William Pope Duval.

== Early and family life ==
Born at Cedar Grove plantation in Fairfax County, Virginia, to former American Revolutionary War officer Daniel McCarty, Jr. (1758–1801) and his wife Sarah Eilbeck Mason (1760–1823), the daughter of prominent planter and founding father George Mason; McCarty received a private education suitable to his class. He had five siblings: his brother Daniel McCarty III would marry and settle on his wife's estates in Charles County, Maryland, his brother John Mason McCarty, a member of the Virginia House of Delegates, killed his relative Armistead Thomson Mason in a duel in 1817, after which he married and also moved to Charles County, Maryland, and his sister Ann Eilbeck Mason McCarty married John William Bronaugh. Despite the War of 1812, William M. McCarty studied law at the College of William and Mary in Williamsburg, Virginia, in 1813 and 1814.

McCarty married twice. In 1816 he married Emily Rutger Mason (1796-1835), a distant relative and the daughter of Virginia politician and U.S. Senator Stevens Thomson Mason, at her father's plantation, Raspberry Plain in Loudoun County, Virginia. In 1838 the widower married Mary Burwell (1811-1892), who would survive him, and bear William Page McCarty, who became a Confederate States Army officer and newspaperman who became famous in his own right for killing John Mordecai in 1873 in a duel concerning a risque poem.

== Career ==
Admitted to the Virginia bar, McCarty began a private legal practice in northern Virginia. He lived at his father's plantation, which he inherited. He owned 7 enslaved people in the 1830 census, 21 enslaved people in 1840, and ten enslaved people in 1850, half of them eleven years old or younger.

In 1823, voters in Fairfax and Loudoun counties first elected McCarty to the Virginia senate, a part-time position. After moving to Florida (although his resignation from his Virginia Senate seat was not recorded), McCarty identified with the Whig administration of the newly acquired territory. President John Quincy Adams in 1826 appointed McCarty as secretary of the Territory of Florida, following the resignation of George Walton. McCarty also briefly served as the territory's Governor after the Governor resigned in late 1826.

Returning to Virginia in 1830, McCarty resumed his legal practice. Furthermore, voters in Fairfax and Loudoun counties again elected (and twice re-elected) him to represent them in the state Senate (1830–1839). In 1839, McCarty, won election to the United States House of Representatives in the Twenty-sixth Congress to fill the vacancy caused by the resignation of Charles F. Mercer. Thus he represented Virginia's 14th congressional district from January 25, 1840 to March 4, 1841.

In 1852, McCarty returned to his home state, sold Cedar Grove and moved to Richmond, Virginia, where he lived his final years. As the American Civil War broke out, he aligned with the Confederacy and his youngest son volunteered and became a Confederate officer.

== Death and legacy ==
Although his son survived the conflict, McCarty died on December 20, 1863. He was interred in Shockoe Hill Cemetery, where his widow would join him nearly two decades later. Although Raspberry Plain, where he married his first wife, survives today and hosts various events, the McCarthy Cedar Grove plantation did not survive until the modern era, but is now part of the Accotink Bay Wildlife Refuge within Fort Belvoir.

== Sources ==
- United States Congress. "William M. McCarty (id: M000322)". Biographical Directory of the United States Congress.

U.S. House of Representatives
Preceded by Charles F. Mercer	Member of the U.S. House of Representatives from Virginia's 14th congressional district January 25, 1840 – March 3, 1841	Succeeded by Cuthbert Powell
