= Emma Van Name =

Painting by Joshua Johnson

- Little Girl in Pink With a Goblet Filled With Strawberries
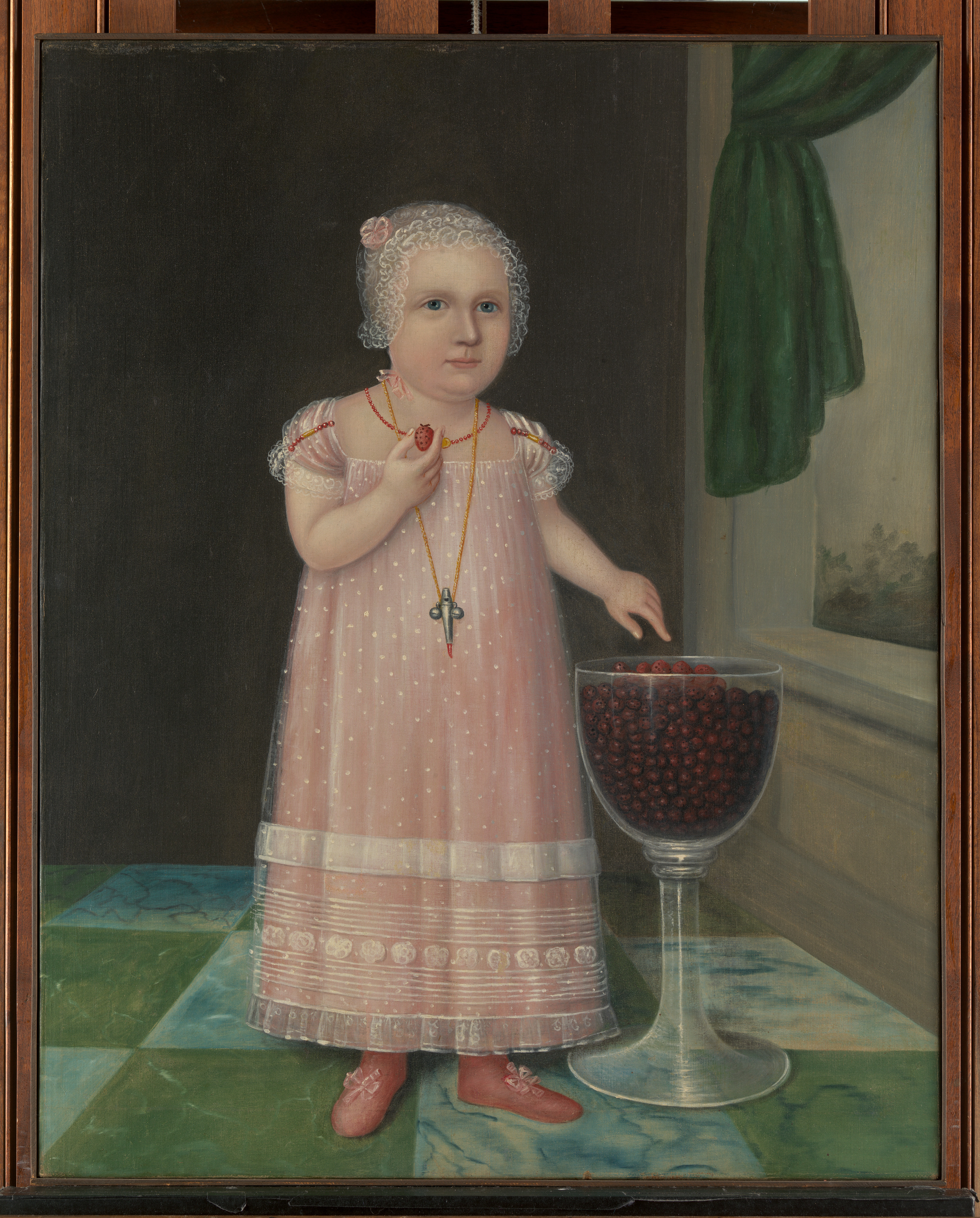
- Artist: Joshua Johnson
- Year: c. 1805
- Medium: oil paint, canvas
- Movement: naïve art
- Subject: girl
- Dimensions: 73.7 cm (29.0 in) × 58.4 cm (23.0 in)
- Location: Metropolitan Museum of Art
- Accession: 2016.116

Emma Van Name also known as Little Girl in Pink With a Goblet Filled With Strawberries is an 1805 portrait painting by self-taught American folk artist Joshua Johnson and is in the collection of the Metropolitan Museum of Art.

== Description ==
The work depicts a female toddler from Maryland and was painted in Baltimore.

It was rediscovered in the late 1950s by New York folk and modernist art dealer, Edith Halpert. Afterward, it was included in numerous international exhibitions and is considered an icon of American folk painting.

After being acquired by Edgar William Garbisch and his wife, Bernice Chrysler Garbisch they donated it to the Whitney Museum of American Art in 1970. However, the museum made a decision in 1978 to focus on "collecting in the 20th century". In 1988, it was sold for $660,000 at Sotheby's to art dealer Alexander Acevedo, more than 14 times the previous record at auction for any of Johnson's work. Sotheby's folk-art specialist Nancy Druckman described it as "one of the most widely exhibited folk portraits."

After the auction closed, actor Bill Cosby, owner of multiple Johnson works, was a critic of the sale.

The work was acquired by the Metropolitan Museum of Art in 2016.
