= Edmund Jennings Lee I =

American lawyer

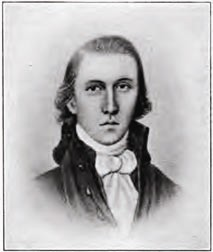

Mayor of Alexandria, D.C.
- In office March 1815 – March 1818
- Preceded by: Charles Simms
- Succeeded by: Jacob Hoffman

Personal details
- Born: May 20, 1772 Leesylvania, Virginia, British America
- Died: March 30, 1843 (aged 70) Alexandria, Virginia, United States
- Party: Federalist
- Children: 5 sons and 4 daughters
- Parent: Henry Lee
- Education: Princeton University (BA) (LLB)

Edmund Jennings Lee I (May 20, 1772 – May 30, 1843) was a lawyer and politician in Alexandria, Virginia. A member of the Lee family of Virginia, he lived for some time at the Lee-Fendall House in Old Town Alexandria, Virginia.

== Early life and career ==
Edmund Jennings Lee was born at Leesylvania plantation on May 20, 1772 and was the fifth son of Henry Lee II and Lucy Grymes. Although his brothers Charles Lee and Richard Bland Lee held federal office, Edmund Lee may have been the member of the Lee family most intimately involved in the economic and political fabric of Alexandria, Virginia society. As a young man, he earned a law degree from Princeton University. Upon returning to Alexandria, Lee began his own law practice and eventually became one of the most renowned and erudite members of the bar. He argued cases not only at the local level, but was also a skilled Supreme Court advocate.

Lee Family Coat of Arms

== Political career ==
Edmund Jennings Lee followed his brothers' path andentered the political arena early in life. He was first elected to the Alexandria Common Council from the third ward in 1809. in 1810, he became the President of the Common Council, but resigned the position in June 1810. Lee was later re-elected to the Council and served on a number of committees. He was elected Mayor of Alexandria in March 1815 and served in that capacity for the next three years. His administration was characterized by austerity; even Lee's own friends were prosecuted for gambling. After stepping down as Mayor in 1818, Lee continued to exercise considerable influence in the community. Appointed Clerk of the Circuit Court for Alexandria County in July 1818, he served until retiring in 1840.

Besides his public service and legal careers, Lee also worked for his community's religious, educational, and social welfare. He served on the vestry at Christ Church for many years. He was appointed to the board of trustees of the Alexandria Academy in August 1818. Established in 1785, the Academy was one of Virginia's first free schools and received an endowment from George Washington at his death in 1799. Disturbed by the blight of slavery and its deleterious effects, Lee became an early member of the American Colonization Society.

== Family ==
In 1796, Edmund married Sarah Lee, daughter of Richard Henry Lee. They had nine children: Edmund Jennings Lee, Jr. (1797–1877), Ann Harriotte (1799–1863), Sarah (1801–1879) known as Sally, William Fitzhugh (1804–1837), Hannah (1806–1872), Cassius Francis (b. 1808), Susan Meade (1814–1815), Charles Henry (b. 1818), and Richard Henry. In 1820, either the Lee household in Alexandria or its neighbor included two free Blacks. A decade later, the Lee household included seven enslaved people. In the last census of his lifetime, after the economic troubles described below, the Lee household included five enslaved people—young man and woman of between 10 and 24, and elderly man and woman, and a woman in the 24 to 34 age range.

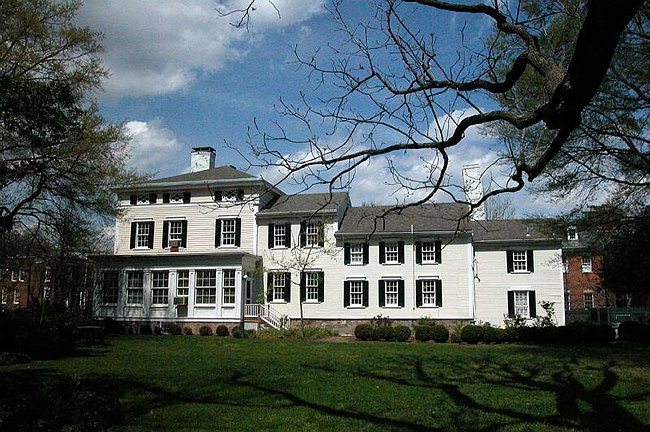
The Lee-Fendall House

== Death and legacy ==
The twilight years of Lee's life were spent quietly at the Lee-Fendall House, where he lived with his daughter Sally and continued to attend to vestry and family business. Unfortunately, financial adversity haunted him like other members of the family. Economic depressions in 1815, 1819, and 1837, coupled with the failure of the Bank of the United States and some of his brother's debts, caused him to mortgage his house. In 1833, unable to meet the payment terms, Lee was forced to sell the Lee-Fendall House at auction. Three years later his son, Edmund Jennings Lee, Jr. recovered the house, and allowed his father, mother, and sister to live in the old family home. By 1839, the elder Lee had recouped financially and repurchased the Lee-Fendall House from his son.

Edmund Jennings Lee died at the house on May 30, 1843. After a funeral service there, he was buried beside his wife, Sarah, at the Christ Church cemetery on Wilkes Street in Alexandria.

== Sources ==
"O Say Can You See: Early Washington, DC Law & Family Project". Center for Digital Research in the Humanities.
