= Charles Simms (lawyer) =

American lawyer & politician (1755–1819)

Member of the Virginia House of Delegates from Fairfax County
- In office October 17, 1785 – October 15, 1786 Serving with David Stuart
- Preceded by: Alexander Henderson
- Succeeded by: George Mason
- In office October 1, 1792 – October 20, 1793 Serving with Roger West
- Preceded by: Nicholas Fitzhugh
- Succeeded by: Charles Lee
- In office November 8, 1796 – October 20, 1793 Serving with Augustine J. Smith
- Preceded by: Charles Lee
- Succeeded by: Roger West

Mayor of Alexandria, D.C.
- In office 1811-1815

Personal details
- Born: 1755 Prince William County, Virginia, British America
- Died: 1819 (aged 63–64) Alexandria, Virginia, U.S.
- Party: Federalist

Military service
- Allegiance: United States
- Branch/service: United States Continental Army
- Years of service: 1776–1779 (Continental Army)
- Rank: Colonel (Continental Army)
- Battles/wars: American Revolutionary War; Battle of Red Bank

Charles Simms (1755–1819) was a Virginia lawyer, Revolutionary War officer and politician. A friend of George Washington, Simms thrice represented Fairfax County, Virginia, in the Virginia House of Delegates as well as at the Virginia Ratification Convention of 1788, and also served as mayor of Alexandria (then in the District of Columbia) during the War of 1812.

== Early and family life ==
He was born in 1755 in Prince William County, Virginia, the son of Jane Glascock Purcell and her husband John Simms. Simms received a private education suitable to his class and was studying law as the American Revolutionary War began.

== American Revolutionary War ==
On 12 November 1776, Simms was commissioned Major of the 13th Virginia Regiment. A number of histories incorrectly identify Simms as Major of the 12th Virginia, which may be attributed to an error in the Journals of the Continental Congress. On 29 September 1777 he was promoted to Lieutenant-Colonel of the 6th Virginia Regiment, as indicated by the General Orders of that day: “Major Simms of the 13th Virginia regt to be Lieut. Col. of the 6th” About a month later, he fought at the Battle of Red Bank. Simms transferred to the 2nd Virginia Regiment on September 14, 1778, and received a promotion to colonel before resigning on December 7, 1779. Following the conflict, Simms became an active member of the Society of the Cincinnati.

== Career ==
After the war Simms practiced law in Alexandria, Virginia, and also collected taxes at the Port of Alexandria (Thompson Mason succeeding him in that office following Simms' death in 1819).

Fairfax County voters elected Simms as one of their representatives in the Virginia House of Delegates in 1785, 1786, 1792 and 1796. A staunch Federalist, Simms also represented Fairfax County in the Virginia Ratifying Convention in 1788 that ratified the United States Constitution, voters electing him and David Stuart in a pointed rebuff the anti-ratification stance of George Mason. He was a candidate for the Electoral College in the 1796 United States presidential election, pledging to vote for John Adams and Patrick Henry. Reflecting his respect for Mason's insistence on a Bill of Rights similar to that Mason had drafted for Virginia, Simms served on the Virginia legislative committee that recommended amendments to the Constitution. In 1799, Simms successfully defended a land claim in the United States Supreme Court case Irvine v. Sims's Lessee (his surname was misspelled in the official court records).

Simms was an active Mason as well as an acquaintance and associate of President George Washington. He served as a pall bearer at Washington's funeral alongside fellow Masons and colonels who had served Washington: Dennis Ramsay, William Payne, George Gilpin, Philip Marsteller and Charles Little. Simms also served on the board of directors of the Bank of Alexandria, the Little River Turnpike Comp[any, and the Marine Insurance Company.

Alexandria voters elected Simms as mayor in 1811. Still serving as such on August 29, 1814, Simms negotiated an arrangement with Captain James Gordon, whose frigate Seahorse led a British armada up the Potomac River, anchored off Alexandria's port, and demanded all ships and cargo awaiting export. Alexandria merchants knew that the nearest Virginia militia, though about 1400 men under Brig. General John P. Hungerford, were about 24 miles away. In return for their agreeing not to burn the town, the British were allowed to restock their ships. They took 21 vessels, as well as 13,786 barrels of flour, 757 hogsheads of tobacco, and tons of cotton, tar, beef, sugar and other merchandise valued at $100,000 without a shot being fired. Thus, unlike Washington, D.C., Alexandria was not burned by British troops. Although censured for his actions (which some characterized as surrendering without a fight), Simms was later exonerated.

== Personal life ==
As the winter encampment at Valley Forge began, on December 15, 1777, in Trenton, New Jersey, Col. Simms married Nancy Ann Douglass, daughter of Major William Douglass and Catherine Van Buskirk. The couple would have eight children, including William Douglas Simms (1783-1822), Catherine Simms Powell (1780-1872) and Ann Douglas Simms Wallach (1793-1832).

In the 1787 Virginia Census, Simms owned two enslaved children and four adults in Alexandria, and property (including livestock) in Fairfax County, but no slaves. In the 1810 census, his seven member household included a boy and three girls under 10 years of age, as well as a teenage girl, but no slaves.

== Death and legacy ==
Simms died on August 29, 1819, in Alexandria (then still part of the District of Columbia), and was buried with military and Masonic honors on August 31, 1819. He is interred at Christ Church Cemetery in Alexandria. Some of his papers are held by the Library of Congress.

His descendants carried on the family's political involvement. His grandson Richard Wallach served as mayor of Washington, D.C., from 1861 to 1868, although his lawyer brother Charles Simms Wallach joined the Confederate Army and served as depot quartermaster at Petersburg. His son-in-law Cuthbert Powell served as Alexandria's mayor before moving to Loudoun County, which he represented in both houses of the Virginia General Assembly and for a single term in the U.S. Congress; two of his grandsons died fighting for the Confederacy, one at each of the Battles of Manassas.

== See also ==
- Early chapters in the development of the Potomac route to the West; Corra Bacon-Foster; Columbia Historical Society; 1912
- Niles' National Register; Hezekiah Niles, William Ogden Niles, Jeremiah Hughes, George Beatty, editors; 1815
