= Jacob Frymire =

American painter

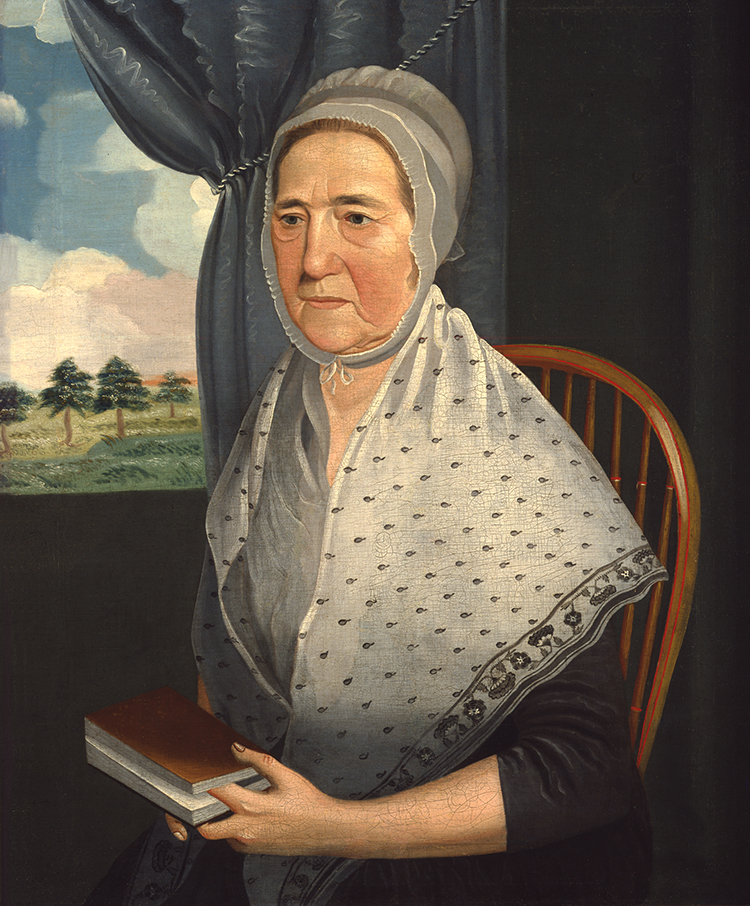
Amelia (Heiskell) Lauck, 1810–1815, oil on canvas, in the Museum of Early Southern Decorative Arts

Jacob Frymire (c. 1765 – 1822) was an American itinerant painter.

Little is known of Frymire's early life or training, and what details of his career are known have been traced either through the signatures on his paintings or via local property records in Franklin and Cumberland Counties, Pennsylvania. His family had ties to Lancaster County, and it has been posited that his early career centered there and in New Jersey. His father moved to Franklin County, Pennsylvania, and Jacob had followed him there by the mid-1790s, traveling as well to Maryland and Virginia in search of work. In 1799, 1800, and 1801 he went to Winchester and Alexandria, Virginia, painting members of the local business community. He continued to visit the Shenandoah Valley over the next several years; 1803 found him in Warrenton, Virginia, and in 1805 he was in Winchester once more. In 1806 he is recorded working in Woodford County, Kentucky; his subjects there had ties to earlier locations he had worked, suggesting that he relied on word-of-mouth recommendations to find subjects. Frymire owned property in Shippensburg, Pennsylvania, and lived there with his wife, Sarah, and family, which grew to ten children, one born posthumously. In later years he was a farmer, working land left to him on his father's death in 1816; the tax rolls of Franklin and Cumberland Counties, between 1807 and 1820, list him as both farmer and limner. His will was written two months before his death.

Stylistically Frymire is typical of the itinerant portrait painters active in the southern United States during the early 19th century. His portrait of Captain Charles McKnight, dating to 1800, is owned by the Smithsonian American Art Museum. A portrait of William Washington Black, dated ca. 1816–1819 and said to be from Baltimore, is in the collection of the Winterthur Museum. His portrait of Amelia (Heiskell) Lauck, dated ca. 1810–1815, is held by the Museum of Early Southern Decorative Arts. A 1791 portrait said to be of Daniel Clarke can be found in the Abby Aldrich Rockefeller Folk Art Museum. Frymire was the subject of an exhibition at the Corcoran Gallery of Art in 1975.
