= Riggleman =

Riggleman is a surname. Notable people with the surname include:

- Denver Riggleman (born 1970), American businessman and politician
- Jim Riggleman (born 1952), American baseball manager and coach
