= 2018 United States House of Representatives elections in Virginia =

- November 6, 2018

All 11 Virginia seats to the United States House of Representatives
	Majority party	Minority party
Party	Democratic	Republican
Last election	4	7
Seats won	7	4
Seat change	▲3	▼3
Popular vote	1,867,061	1,408,701
Percentage	56.69%	42.77%
Swing	▲7.52%	▼5.97%

Democratic hold Democratic gain
Republican hold
Democratic
50–60%
60–70%
70–80%
80–90%
90–100%
Republican
50–60%
60–70%
70–80%

The 2018 United States House of Representatives elections in Virginia were held on November 6, 2018, to elect the 11 U.S. representatives from the state of Virginia, one from each of the state's 11 congressional districts. The elections coincided with other states' elections to the House of Representatives, elections to the United States Senate and various state and local elections. Primary elections took place on June 12.

The state congressional delegation flipped from a 7–4 Republican majority to a 7–4 Democratic majority. Democrats last held a majority of seats in the state in 2010.

== Statewide results ==
Party	Candidates	Votes		Seats		
Party	Candidates	No.	%	No.	+/–	%
Democratic	11	1,867,061	56.69%	7	▲3	63.64%
Republican	10	1,408,701	42.77%	4	▼3	36.36%
Libertarian	3	13,995	0.42%	0	Steady	0.0%
Write-in	11	4,050	0.12%	0	Steady	0.0%
Total	35	3,293,807	100%	11	Steady	100%

Statewide popular vote
Democratic	56.69%
Republican	42.77%
Libertarian	0.42%
Write-in	0.12%

House seats
Democratic	63.64%
Republican	36.36%

=== By district ===
Results of the 2018 United States House of Representatives elections in Virginia by district:

District	Democratic		Republican		Others		Total		Result
District	Votes	%	Votes	%	Votes	%	Votes	%	Result
District 1	148,464	44.70%	183,250	55.18%	387	0.12%	332,101	100.0%	Republican hold
District 2	139,571	51.05%	133,458	48.81%	371	0.14%	273,400	100.0%	Democratic gain
District 3	198,615	91.22%	0	0.00%	19,107	8.78%	217,722	100.0%	Democratic hold
District 4	187,642	62.58%	107,706	35.92%	4,506	1.50%	299,854	100.0%	Democratic hold
District 5	145,040	46.65%	165,339	53.18%	547	0.18%	310,926	100.0%	Republican hold
District 6	113,133	40.21%	167,957	59.69%	287	0.10%	281,377	100.0%	Republican hold
District 7	176,079	50.34%	169,295	48.40%	4,429	1.27%	349,803	100.0%	Democratic gain
District 8	247,137	76.10%	76,899	23.68%	712	0.22%	324,748	100.0%	Democratic hold
District 9	85,833	34.75%	160,933	65.16%	214	0.09%	246,980	100.0%	Republican hold
District 10	206,356	56.11%	160,841	43.73%	598	0.16%	367,795	100.0%	Democratic gain
District 11	219,191	71.11%	83,023	26.93%	6,036	1.96%	308,250	100.0%	Democratic hold
Total	1,867,061	56.36%	1,408,701	42.52%	37,194	1.12%	3,312,956	100.0%	

== District 1 ==
2018 Virginia's 1st congressional district election
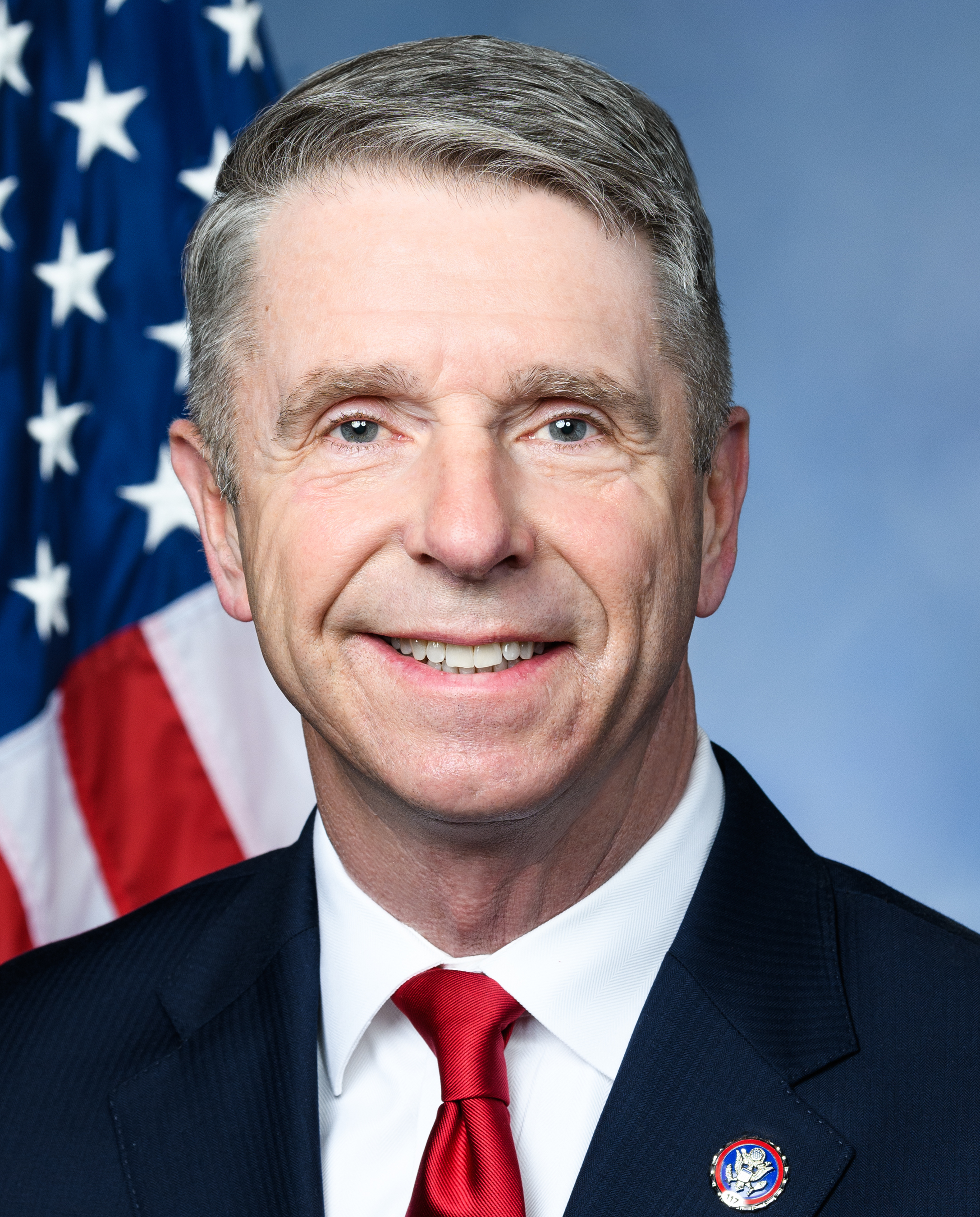

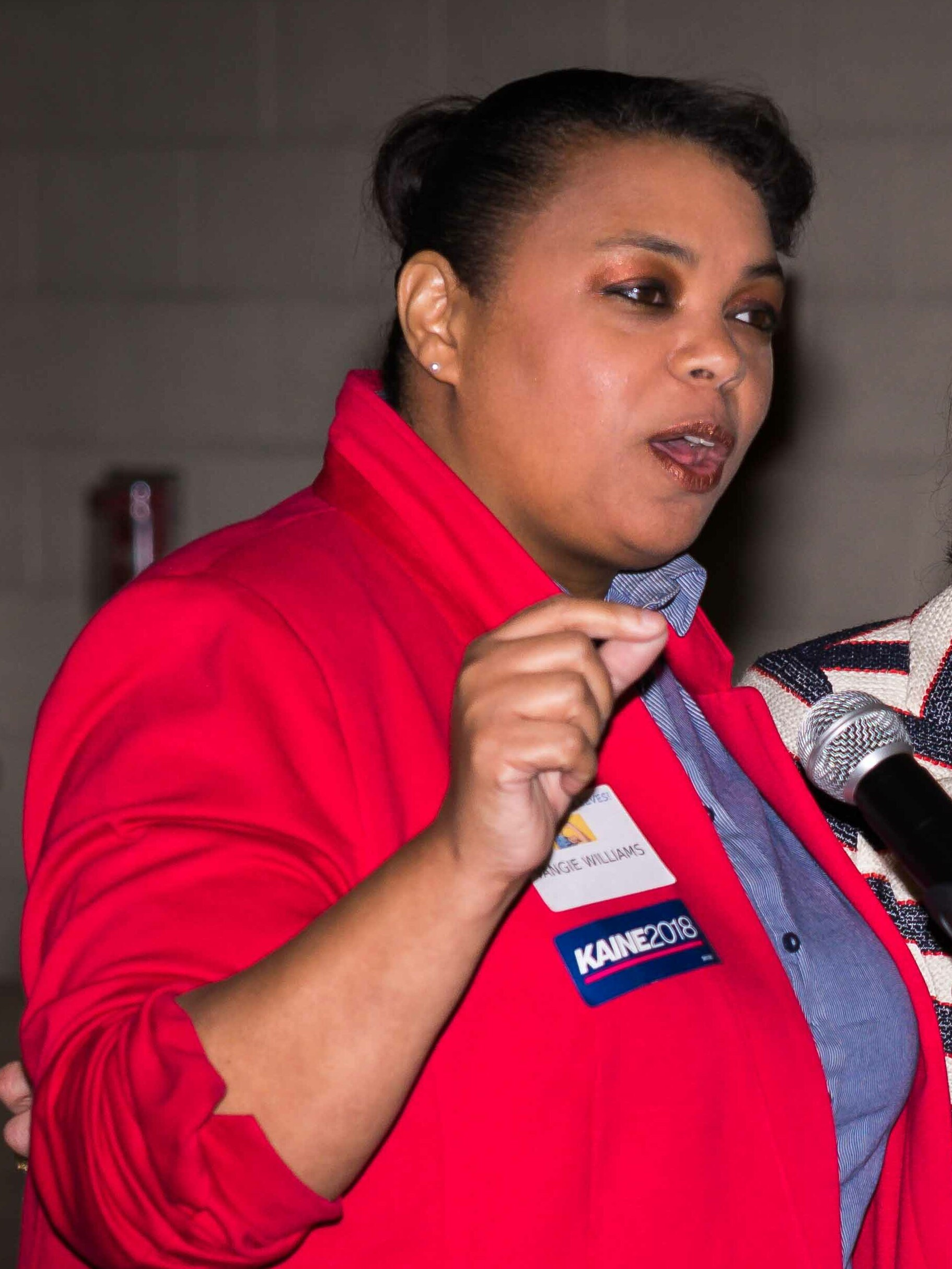
Nominee	Rob Wittman	Vangie Williams
Party	Republican	Democratic
Popular vote	183,250	148,464
Percentage	55.2%	44.7%
- Wittman: 50–60% 60–70% 70–80% 80–90% Williams: 50–60% 60–70% 70–80% >90%
U.S. Representative before election
Rob Wittman
Republican
Elected U.S. Representative
Rob Wittman
Republican

Incumbent Republican Rob Wittman, who had represented the district since 2007, ran for re-election. He was re-elected with 60% of the vote in 2016. The district had a PVI of R+8.

=== Republican primary ===
Wittman was unopposed for the Republican nomination.

==== Candidates ====
===== Nominee =====
- Rob Wittman, incumbent U.S. representative

=== Democratic primary ===
==== Candidates ====
===== Nominee =====
- Vangie Williams, strategic planner, professional genealogist, historian, and professional speaker

===== Eliminated in primary =====
- Edwin Santana, former Marine
- John Suddarth, Army veteran and businessman

===== Withdrawn =====
- Ryan Sawyers, Prince William County School Board chair

==== Results ====
Vangie Williams defeated both Edwin Santana and John Suddarth in the Democratic primary, becoming the first woman of color to ever win a primary for congressional office throughout Virginia.

Democratic primary results
Party	Candidate	Votes	%
Democratic	Vangie Williams	11,008	40.0
Democratic	Edwin Santana	9,059	32.9
Democratic	John Suddarth	7,471	27.1
Total votes		27,538	100.0

=== General election ===
==== Predictions ====
Source	Ranking	As of
The Cook Political Report	Safe R	November 5, 2018
Inside Elections	Safe R	November 5, 2018
Sabato's Crystal Ball	Safe R	November 5, 2018
RCP	Safe R	November 5, 2018
Daily Kos	Safe R	November 5, 2018
538	Safe R	November 7, 2018
CNN	Safe R	October 31, 2018
Politico	Safe R	November 4, 2018

==== Endorsements ====
Vangie Williams (D)

U.S. senators

- Tim Kaine, U.S. senator (D-VA)
- Mark Warner, U.S. senator (D-VA)

U.S. representatives

- Don Beyer, U.S. representative (D-VA-8)
- Gerry Connolly, U.S. representative (D-VA-11)
- John Lewis, U.S. representative (D-GA-5)
- Bobby Scott, U.S. representative (D-VA-3)

Statewide officials

- Mark Herring, attorney general of Virginia
- Ralph Northam, governor of Virginia

State senate

- Rosalyn Dance, state senator (D-16)

State delegates

- Jennifer Carroll Foy, state delegate (D-2)
- Elizabeth Guzman, state delegate (D-31)
- Marcus Simon, state delegate (D-53)
- Luke Torian, state delegate (D-52)

Organizations

- Liberal Women of Chesterfield County

Individuals

- Khizr Khan, Gold Star father

==== Debate ====
2018 Virginia's 2nd congressional district debate
No.	Date	Host	Moderator	Link	Republican	Democratic
Key: P Participant A Absent N Not invited I Invited W Withdrawn						
Key: P Participant A Absent N Not invited I Invited W Withdrawn					Rob Wittman	Vangie Williams
1	Oct. 22, 2018	University of Mary Washington			P	P

==== Results ====
Virginia's 1st congressional district, 2018
Party	Candidate	Votes	%
Republican	Rob Wittman (incumbent)	183,250	55.2
Democratic	Vangie Williams	148,464	44.7
Write-in		387	0.1
Total votes		332,101	100.0
Republican hold			

== District 2 ==
2018 Virginia's 2nd congressional district election
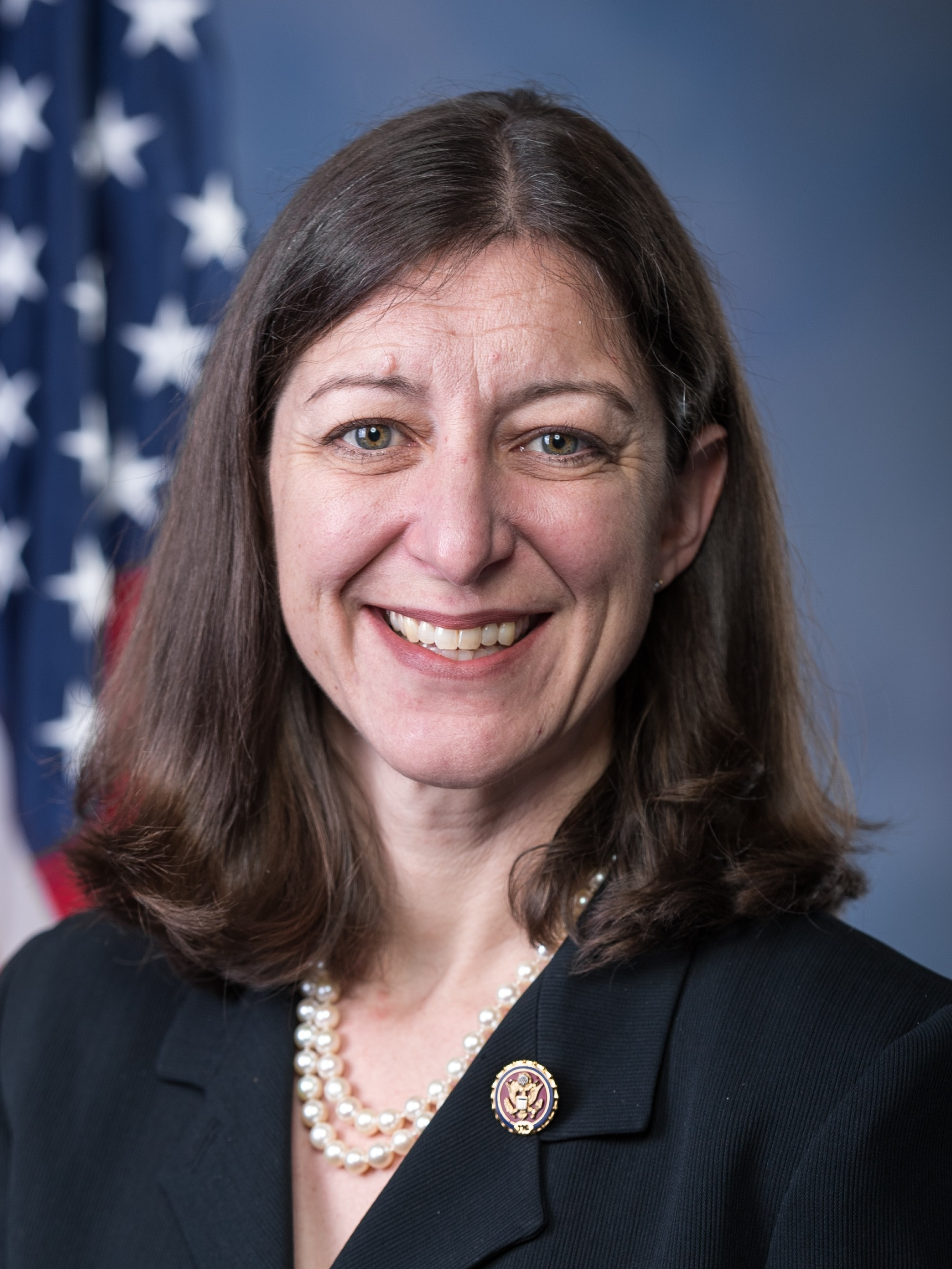

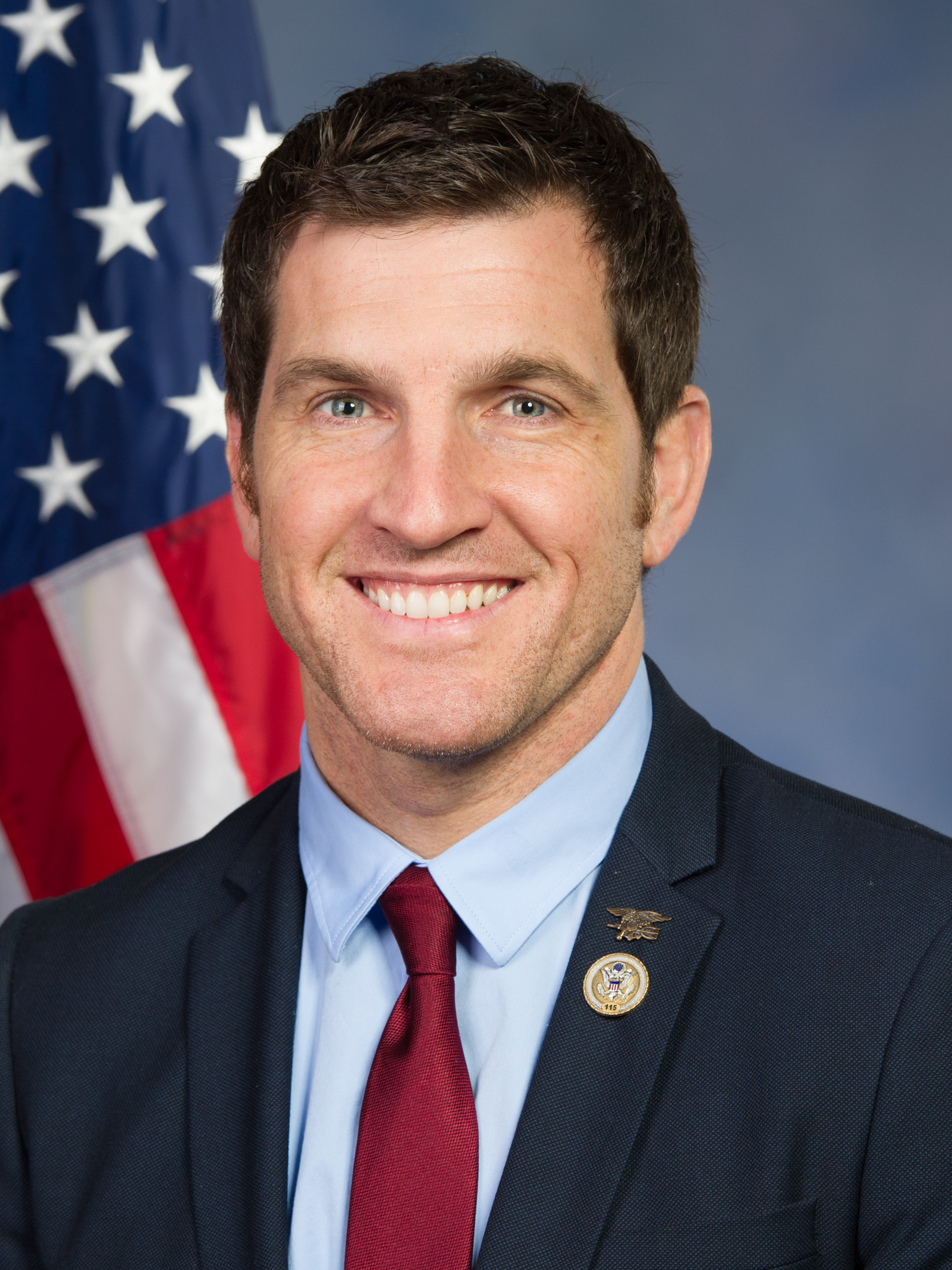
Nominee	Elaine Luria	Scott Taylor
Party	Democratic	Republican
Popular vote	139,571	133,458
Percentage	51.1%	48.8%
- Luria: 50–60% 60–70% 70–80% 80–90% >90% Taylor: 50–60% 60–70% 70–80% >90%
U.S. Representative before election
Scott Taylor
Republican
Elected U.S. Representative
Elaine Luria
Democratic

Incumbent Republican Scott Taylor, who had represented the district since 2016, ran for re-election. He was elected with 61% of the vote in 2016. The district had a PVI of R+3. This was one of only two GOP held seats that voted for Democrat Ralph Northam in 2017.

=== Republican primary ===
==== Campaign ====
Taylor was challenged in the Republican primary by former James City County Supervisor Mary Jones, who attacked Rep. Taylor for his moderate stances and because she believed he had not backed President Donald Trump's proposals strongly enough.

==== Candidates ====
===== Nominee =====
- Scott Taylor, incumbent U.S. representative

===== Eliminated in primary =====
- Mary Jones, former James City County Supervisor

==== Endorsements ====
Mary Jones

Organizations

- Americans for Legal Immigration
Scott Taylor

Individuals

- John Bolton, former United States Ambassador to the United Nations

==== Results ====
Republican primary results
Party	Candidate	Votes	%
Republican	Scott Taylor (incumbent)	28,515	76.1
Republican	Mary Jones	8,982	23.9
Total votes		37,497	100.0

=== Democratic primary ===
==== Campaign ====
The Democratic Congressional Campaign Committee supported Elaine Luria, a United States Naval commander, for the nomination.

==== Candidates ====
===== Nominee =====
- Elaine Luria, United States Naval commander

===== Eliminated in primary =====
- Karen Mallard, teacher

===== Declined =====
- Shaun Brown, community activist and nominee for this seat in 2016

==== Results ====
Democratic primary results
Party	Candidate	Votes	%
Democratic	Elaine Luria	17,552	62.3
Democratic	Karen Mallard	10,610	37.7
Total votes		28,162	100.0

=== Independents ===
==== Candidates ====
===== Withdrawn =====
- Shaun Brown, community activist and Democratic nominee for this seat in 2016
- Padraig-Eoin Dalrymple, entrepreneur

=== General election ===
==== Campaign ====
===== Brown signature fraud =====
Roanoke Commonwealth's Attorney Donald Caldwell had been appointed as a special prosecutor to investigate claims that Taylor's aides forged signatures, including those of Delegate Glenn Davis and his wife, on Shaun Brown's petitions to make the ballot as an independent candidate. Taylor had already cut ties with his campaign manager when these irregularities came to light and promised to cooperate with the investigation, and said that the irregularities in the petitions should have no bearing on Brown's right to be on the ballot.

Shaun Brown submitted 2,163 petition signatures which actually went through the verification process. 1,030 of those were considered valid. Democrats asked the Virginia State Board of Elections to remove Brown from the ballot for falling short of the 1,000 signatures required, and filed suit. They also asked Attorney General of Virginia Mark Herring to investigate.

A review of the signatures also revealed that more than 50 Virginia Beach sheriff's employees had signed petition forms at work to get Brown on the ballot during the closing days of the petition drive, when petitioners were scrambling to meet the deadline.

Brown was accused by federal prosecutors of lying to the Federal Election Commission about donating $700,000 to her campaign and bilking the government by falsifying the number of meals her nonprofit fed to needy children, but her trial—in which Brown testified in her own defense and was subjected to a lengthy cross-examination—ended in a mistrial after the jury deadlocked 11–1. In a new trial the following October, Brown was convicted of fraud conspiracy, two counts of wire fraud and theft of government property. In March, 2019 Brown was sentenced to three years in prison.

In September, circuit judge Gregory Rupe ordered Brown off the ballot. Brown subsequently appealed to the Virginia Supreme Court but justices declined to hear her case. The Virginia Attorney General's office argued that it was too late for her to appear on the ballot.

==== Endorsements ====
Scott Taylor (R)

Organizations

- Virginia Society for Human Life

Individuals

- John Bolton, former United States Ambassador to the United Nations
Elaine Luria (D)

U.S. representatives

- Donald McEachin, U.S. representative (D-VA-4)
- Bobby Scott, U.S. representative (D-VA-3)

Statewide officials

- Justin Fairfax, lieutenant governor of Virginia
- Ralph Northam, governor of Virginia

State senators

- Lynwood Lewis, state senator (D-6)
- Mamie Locke, state senator (D-2)
- Lionell Spruill, state senator (D-5)

State delegates

- Steve Heretick, state delegate (D-79)
- Joe Lindsey, state delegate (D-90)
- Mike Mullin, state delegate (D-93)
- Jeion Ward, state delegate (D-92)

==== Debate ====
2018 Virginia's 2nd congressional district debate
No.	Date	Host	Moderator	Link	Republican	Democratic
Key: P Participant A Absent N Not invited I Invited W Withdrawn						
Key: P Participant A Absent N Not invited I Invited W Withdrawn					Scott Taylor	Elaine Luria
1	Oct. 23, 2018	Hampton Roads; Chamber of Commerce	Bob Hollsworth		P	P

==== Polling ====
Poll source	Date(s) administered	Sample size	Margin of error	Scott Taylor (R)	Elaine Luria (D)	Undecided
Change Research (D)	November 2–4, 2018	710	–	47%	47%	6%
NYT Upshot/Siena College	October 18–22, 2018	508	± 4.6%	45%	42%	13%
Christopher Newport University	October 3–12, 2018	798	± 4.0%	50%	43%	7%
NYT Upshot/Siena College	September 26 – October 1, 2018	500	± 4.5%	49%	41%	10%
Change Research (D)	September 26–28, 2018	758	–	46%	46%	–
Garin-Hart-Yang Research Group (D-Luria)	September 5–8, 2018	404	± 5.0%	43%	51%	–
Public Policy Polling (D)	April 16–17, 2018	609	± 4.0%	48%	42%	10%

==== Predictions ====
Source	Ranking	As of
The Cook Political Report	Tossup	November 5, 2018
Inside Elections	Tilt R	November 5, 2018
Sabato's Crystal Ball	Lean D (flip)	November 5, 2018
RCP	Lean R	November 5, 2018
Daily Kos	Tossup	November 5, 2018
538	Lean R	November 7, 2018
CNN	Tossup	October 31, 2018
Politico	Tossup	November 4, 2018

==== Results ====
Virginia's 2nd congressional district, 2018
Party	Candidate	Votes	%
Democratic	Elaine Luria	139,571	51.1
Republican	Scott Taylor (incumbent)	133,458	48.8
Write-in		371	0.1
Total votes		273,400	100.0
Democratic gain from Republican			

== District 3 ==
2018 Virginia's 3rd congressional district election
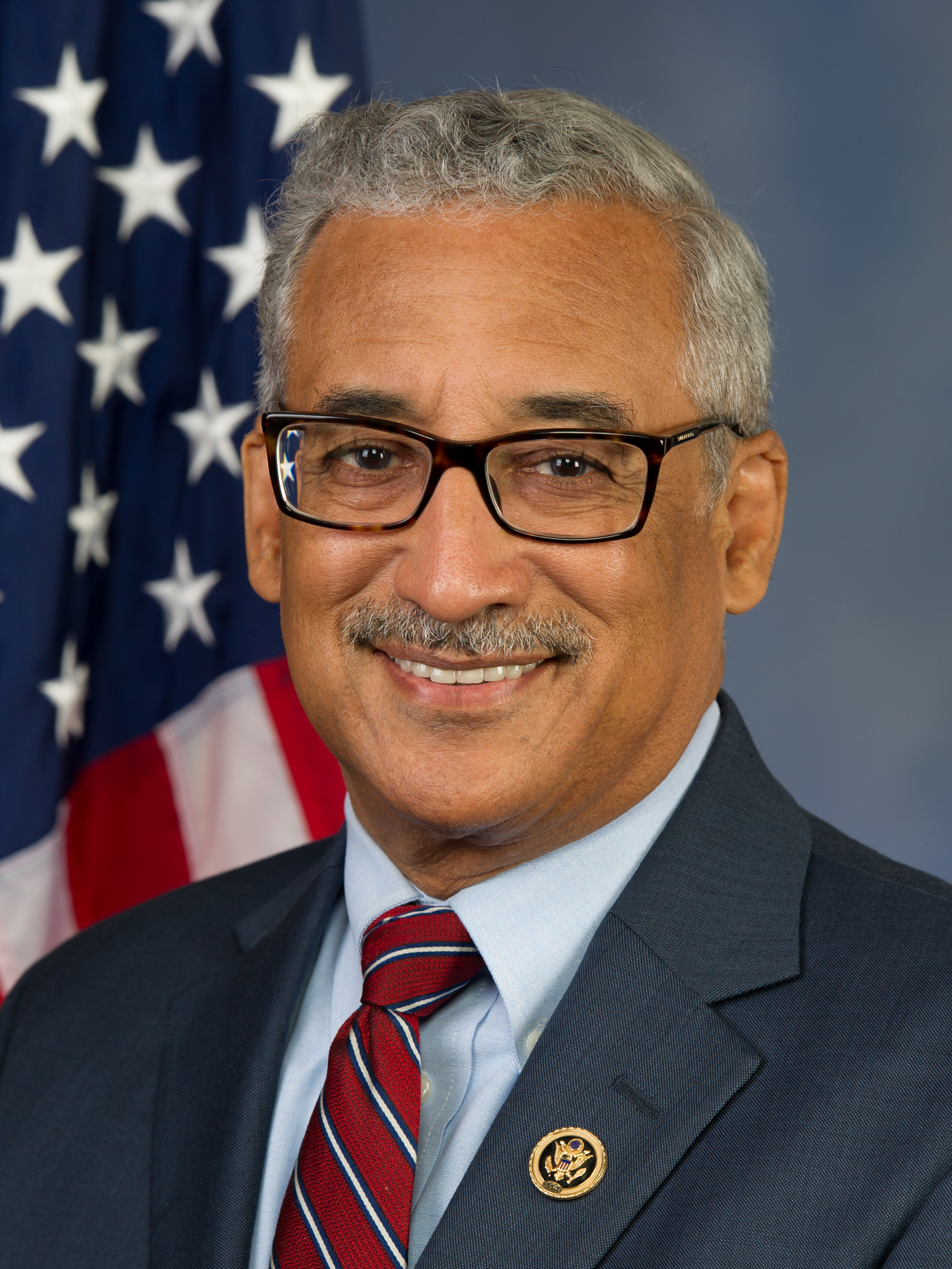

Nominee	Bobby Scott	Write-ins
Party	Democratic	Write-In
Popular vote	198,615	19,107
Percentage	91.2%	8.8%
- Scott: 70–80% 80–90% >90%
U.S. Representative before election
Bobby Scott
Democratic
Elected U.S. Representative
Bobby Scott
Democratic

Incumbent Democrat Bobby Scott, who had represented the district since 1993, ran for re-election. He was re-elected with 67% of the vote in 2016. The district had a PVI of D+16.

=== Democratic primary ===
==== Candidates ====
===== Nominee =====
- Bobby Scott, incumbent U.S. representative

=== Republican primary ===
No Republicans filed.

=== General election ===
Scott ran unopposed as no Republican candidates filed for the district.

==== Predictions ====
Source	Ranking	As of
The Cook Political Report	Safe D	November 5, 2018
Inside Elections	Safe D	November 5, 2018
Sabato's Crystal Ball	Safe D	November 5, 2018
RCP	Safe D	November 5, 2018
Daily Kos	Safe D	November 5, 2018
538	Safe D	November 7, 2018
CNN	Safe D	October 31, 2018
Politico	Safe D	November 4, 2018

==== Results ====
Virginia's 3rd congressional district, 2018
Party	Candidate	Votes	%
Democratic	Bobby Scott (incumbent)	198,615	91.2
Write-in		19,107	8.8
Total votes		217,772	100.0
Democratic hold			

== District 4 ==
2018 Virginia's 4th congressional district election
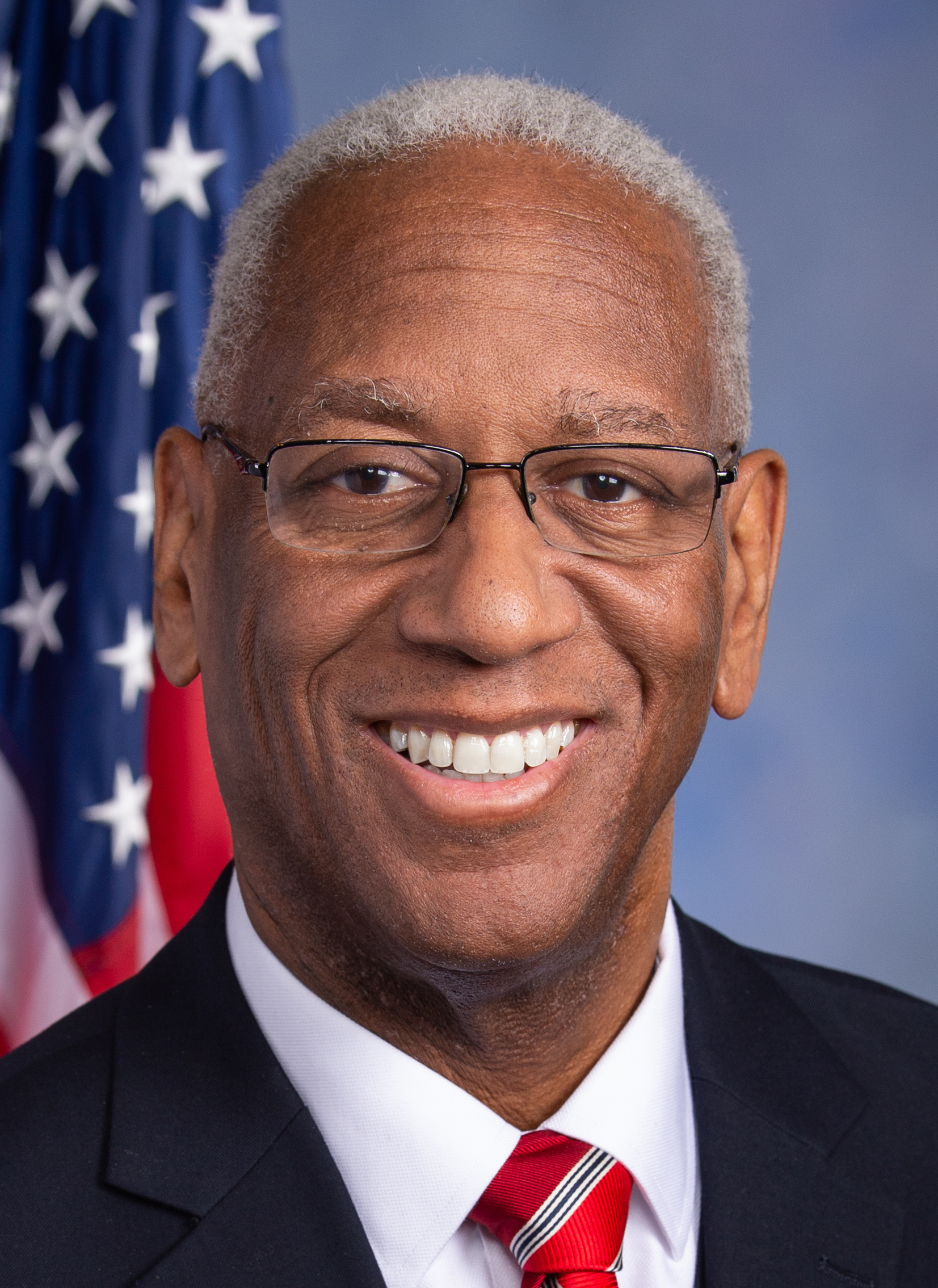

Nominee	Donald McEachin	Ryan McAdams
Party	Democratic	Republican
Popular vote	187,642	107,706
Percentage	62.6%	35.9%
- McEachin: 40–50% 50–60% 60–70% 70–80% 80–90% >90% McAdams: 50–60% 60–70% 70–80% 80–90%
U.S. Representative before election
Donald McEachin
Democratic
Elected U.S. Representative
Donald McEachin
Democratic

Incumbent Democrat Donald McEachin, who had represented the district since 2017, ran for re-election. He was elected with 58% of the vote in 2016. The district had a PVI of D+10.

=== Democratic primary ===
McEachin ran unopposed for the Democratic nomination.

==== Candidates ====
===== Nominee =====
- Donald McEachin, incumbent U.S. representative

=== Republican primary ===
==== Candidates ====
===== Nominee =====
- Ryan McAdams, pastor

===== Eliminated in primary =====
- Shion Fenty, fashion designer

===== Withdrawn =====
- David Leon

==== Results ====
Republican primary results
Party	Candidate	Votes	%
Republican	Ryan McAdams	17,513	72.6
Republican	Shion Fenty	6,621	27.4
Total votes		24,134	100.0

=== General election ===
==== Predictions ====
Source	Ranking	As of
The Cook Political Report	Safe D	November 5, 2018
Inside Elections	Safe D	November 5, 2018
Sabato's Crystal Ball	Safe D	November 5, 2018
RCP	Safe D	November 5, 2018
Daily Kos	Safe D	November 5, 2018
538	Safe D	November 7, 2018
CNN	Safe D	October 31, 2018
Politico	Safe D	November 4, 2018

==== Endorsements ====
Ryan McAdams

U.S. executive branch officials

- Mike Pence, vice president

==== Results ====
Virginia's 4th congressional district, 2018
Party	Candidate	Votes	%
Democratic	Donald McEachin (incumbent)	187,642	62.6
Republican	Ryan McAdams	107,706	35.9
Libertarian	Pete Wells	4,233	1.4
Write-in		273	0.1
Total votes		299,854	100.00
Democratic hold			

== District 5 ==
2018 Virginia's 5th congressional district election
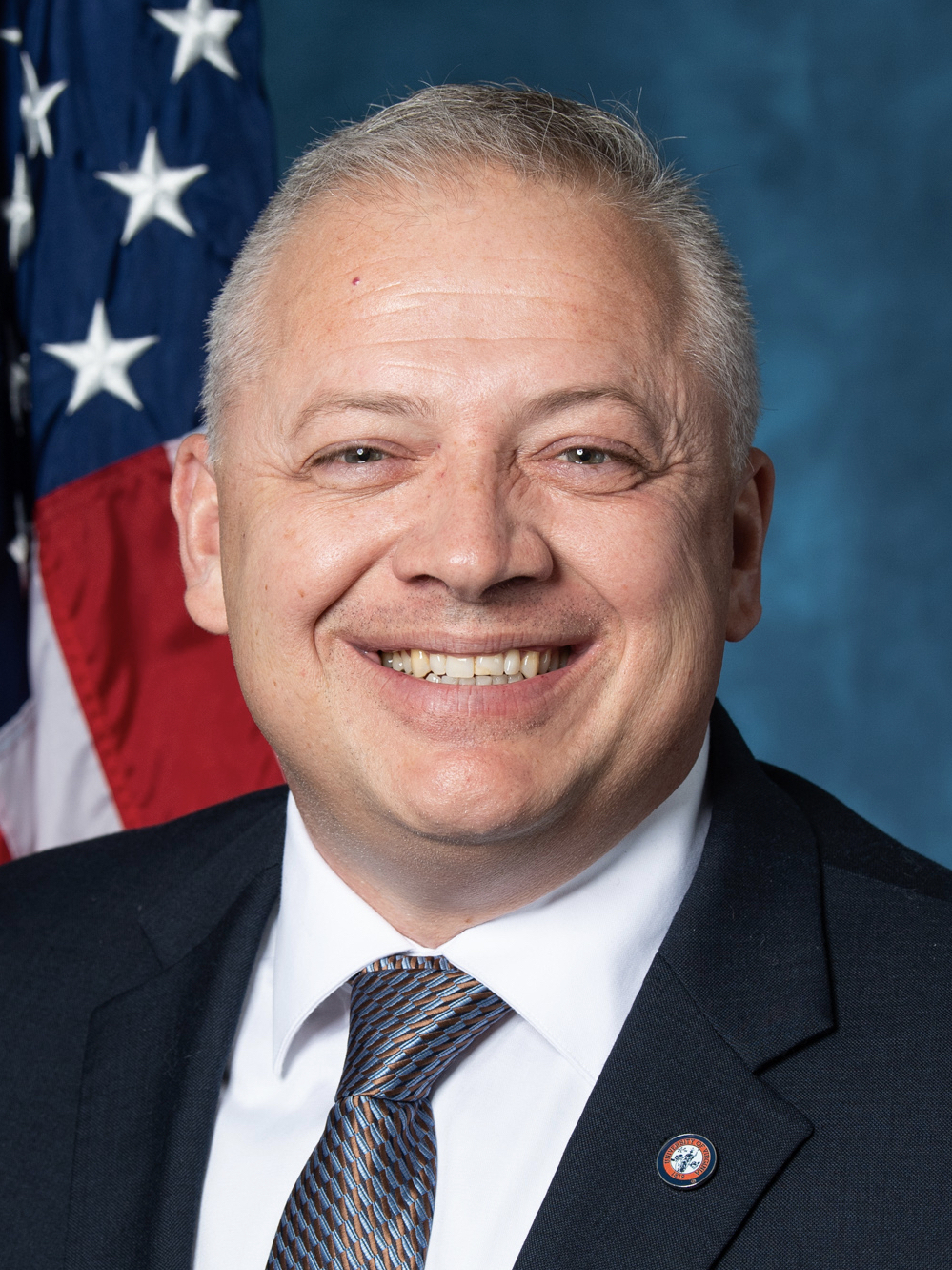

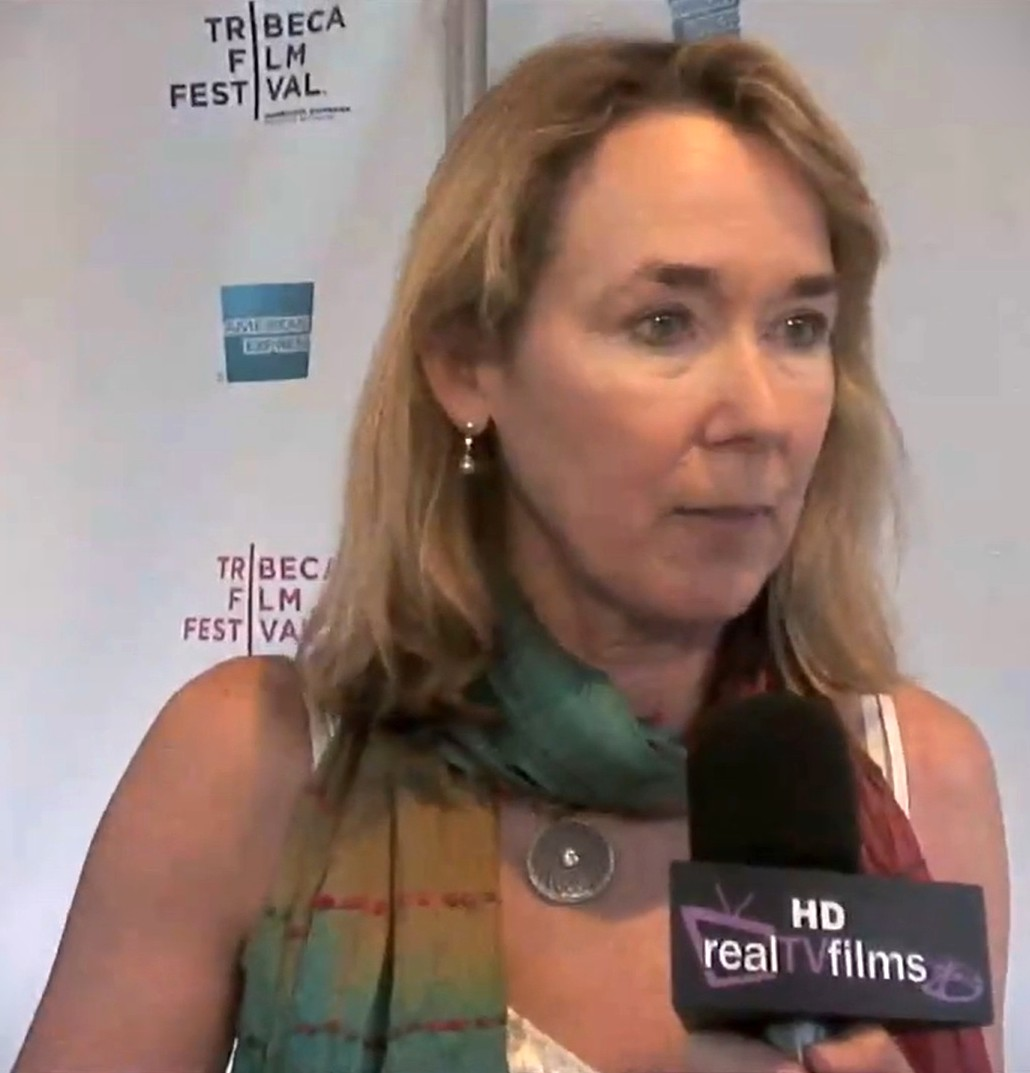
Nominee	Denver Riggleman	Leslie Cockburn
Party	Republican	Democratic
Popular vote	165,339	145,040
Percentage	53.2%	46.7%
- Riggleman: 50–60% 60–70% 70–80% 80–90% Cockburn: 50–60% 60–70% 70–80% 80–90% >90% Tie: 50%
U.S. Representative before election
Tom Garrett
Republican
Elected U.S. Representative
Denver Riggleman
Republican

Incumbent Republican Tom Garrett, who had represented the district since 2017, did not run for re-election. He was elected with 58% of the vote in 2016. The district had a PVI of R+6.

=== Republican convention ===
Garrett announced on May 28, 2018, that he would not run for reelection due to his struggle with alcoholism. Instead of a traditional primary to elect the Democratic and Republican nominees, party delegates voted to hold district conventions instead.

The Republican convention was held on June 2, 2018, less than one week after Garrett announced he would not seek reelection. Denver Riggleman edged out Cynthia Dunbar, who had just lost the Republican nomination in the 6th district just weeks before, in the final round of voting to get the Republican nomination.

==== Candidates ====
===== Nominee =====
- Denver Riggleman, distillery owner

===== Eliminated at the convention =====
- Martha Boneta, farmer
- Michael Del Rosso, technology executive
- Cynthia Dunbar, national GOP committee member
- Michael Webert, state delegate
- Joe Whited, veteran

=== Democratic convention ===
The Democratic convention was held on May 5, 2018. The party delegates chose Leslie Cockburn as the Democratic nominee.

==== Candidates ====
===== Nominee =====
- Leslie Cockburn, investigative journalist

===== Eliminated at the convention =====
- Roger Dean "RD" Huffstetler, Marine veteran
- Andrew Sneathern, former Albemarle County assistant attorney

=== General election ===
==== Endorsements ====
Denver Riggleman

U.S. executive branch officials

- Donald Trump, 45th president of the United States

==== Debates ====
2018 Virginia's 5th congressional district debates
No.	Date	Host	Moderator	Link	Republican	Democratic
Key: P Participant A Absent N Not invited I Invited W Withdrawn						
Key: P Participant A Absent N Not invited I Invited W Withdrawn					Denver Riggleman	Leslie Cockburn
1	Sep. 28, 2018	Frank Batten School of Leadership and Public Policy; University of Virginia Center for Effective Lawmaking; University of Virginia College Republicans; University of Virginia University Democrats	Craig Volden; Gerald Warburg		P	P
2	Oct. 8, 2018	Piedmont Virginia Community College	Tyler Hawn		P	P

==== Polling ====
Poll source	Date(s) administered	Sample size	Margin of error	Denver Riggleman (R)	Leslie Cockburn (D)	Undecided
NYT Upshot/Siena College	October 16–22, 2018	501	± 4.6%	45%	46%	10%

==== Predictions ====
Source	Ranking	As of
The Cook Political Report	Lean R	November 5, 2018
Inside Elections	Likely R	November 5, 2018
Sabato's Crystal Ball	Lean R	November 5, 2018
RCP	Tossup	November 5, 2018
Daily Kos	Lean R	November 5, 2018
538	Tossup	November 7, 2018
CNN	Lean R	October 31, 2018
Politico	Lean R	November 4, 2018

==== Results ====
Virginia's 5th congressional district, 2018
Party	Candidate	Votes	%
Republican	Denver Riggleman	165,339	53.2
Democratic	Leslie Cockburn	145,040	46.7
Write-in		547	0.2
Total votes		310,926	100.0
Republican hold			

== District 6 ==
2018 Virginia's 6th congressional district election
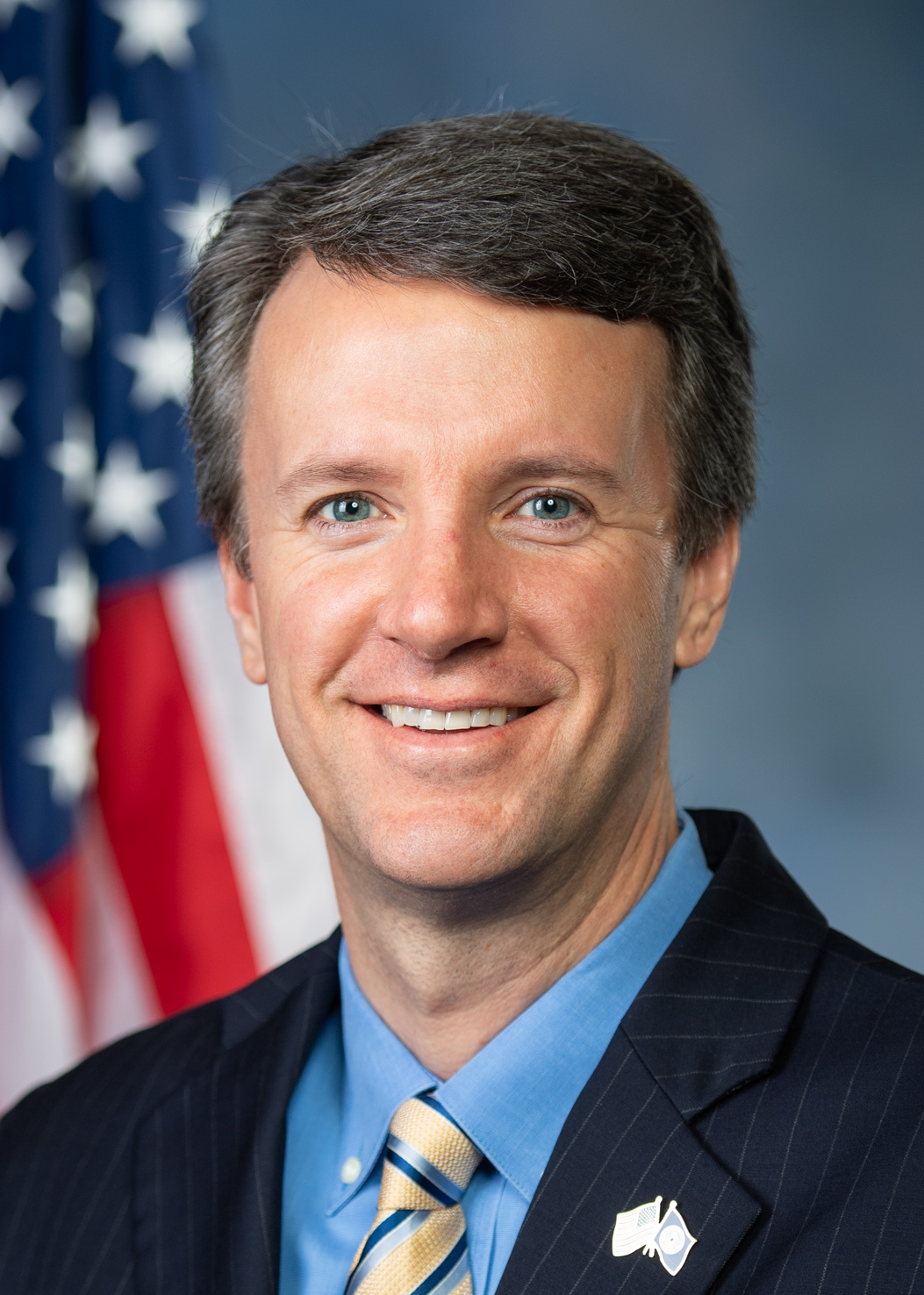

Nominee	Ben Cline	Jennifer Lewis
Party	Republican	Democratic
Popular vote	167,957	113,133
Percentage	59.7%	40.2%
- Cline: 50–60% 60–70% 70–80% 80–90% >90% Lewis: 50–60% 60–70% 70–80% 80–90% >90%
U.S. Representative before election
Bob Goodlatte
Republican
Elected U.S. Representative
Ben Cline
Republican

Incumbent Republican Bob Goodlatte, who had represented the district since 1993, did not run for re-election. He was re-elected with 67% of the vote in 2016. The district had a PVI of R+13.

The 6th district was an open seat in 2018, after Goodlatte announced his retirement in November 2017.

=== Republican convention ===
Republican delegates decided to hold a party convention instead of the primary to choose their nominee. Eight Republicans ran in the convention in this district, where State Delegate Ben Cline was chosen as the GOP nominee.

==== Candidates ====
===== Nominee =====
- Ben Cline, state delegate

===== Eliminated in primary =====
- Mike Desjadon
- Cynthia Dunbar, national GOP committee member
- Chaz Haywood, Rockingham County Clerk of Court
- Ed Justo, lawyer
- Kathryn Lewis, small business owner
- Elliot Pope, businessman
- Douglas Wright, dentist and U.S. Navy veteran

===== Withdrawn =====
- Chan Park

===== Declined =====
- Bob Goodlatte, incumbent U.S. representative

=== Democratic primary ===
==== Candidates ====
===== Nominee =====
- Jennifer Lewis, hospital liaison

===== Eliminated in primary =====
- Sergio Coppola
- Charlotte Moore, former Roanoke County supervisor
- Peter Volosin, regional planner

==== Results ====
Democratic primary results
Party	Candidate	Votes	%
Democratic	Jennifer Lewis	8,202	47.7
Democratic	Peter Volosin	4,678	27.2
Democratic	Charlotte Moore	3,175	18.5
Democratic	Sergio Coppola	1,150	6.68
Total votes		17,205	100.0

=== General election ===
==== Predictions ====
Source	Ranking	As of
The Cook Political Report	Safe R	November 5, 2018
Inside Elections	Safe R	November 5, 2018
Sabato's Crystal Ball	Safe R	November 5, 2018
RCP	Safe R	November 5, 2018
Daily Kos	Safe R	November 5, 2018
538	Safe R	November 7, 2018
CNN	Safe R	October 31, 2018
Politico	Safe R	November 4, 2018

==== Results ====
Virginia's 6th congressional district, 2018
Party	Candidate	Votes	%
Republican	Ben Cline	167,957	59.7
Democratic	Jennifer Lewis	113,133	40.2
Write-in		287	0.1
Total votes		281,377	100.0
Republican hold			

== District 7 ==
2018 Virginia's 7th congressional district election
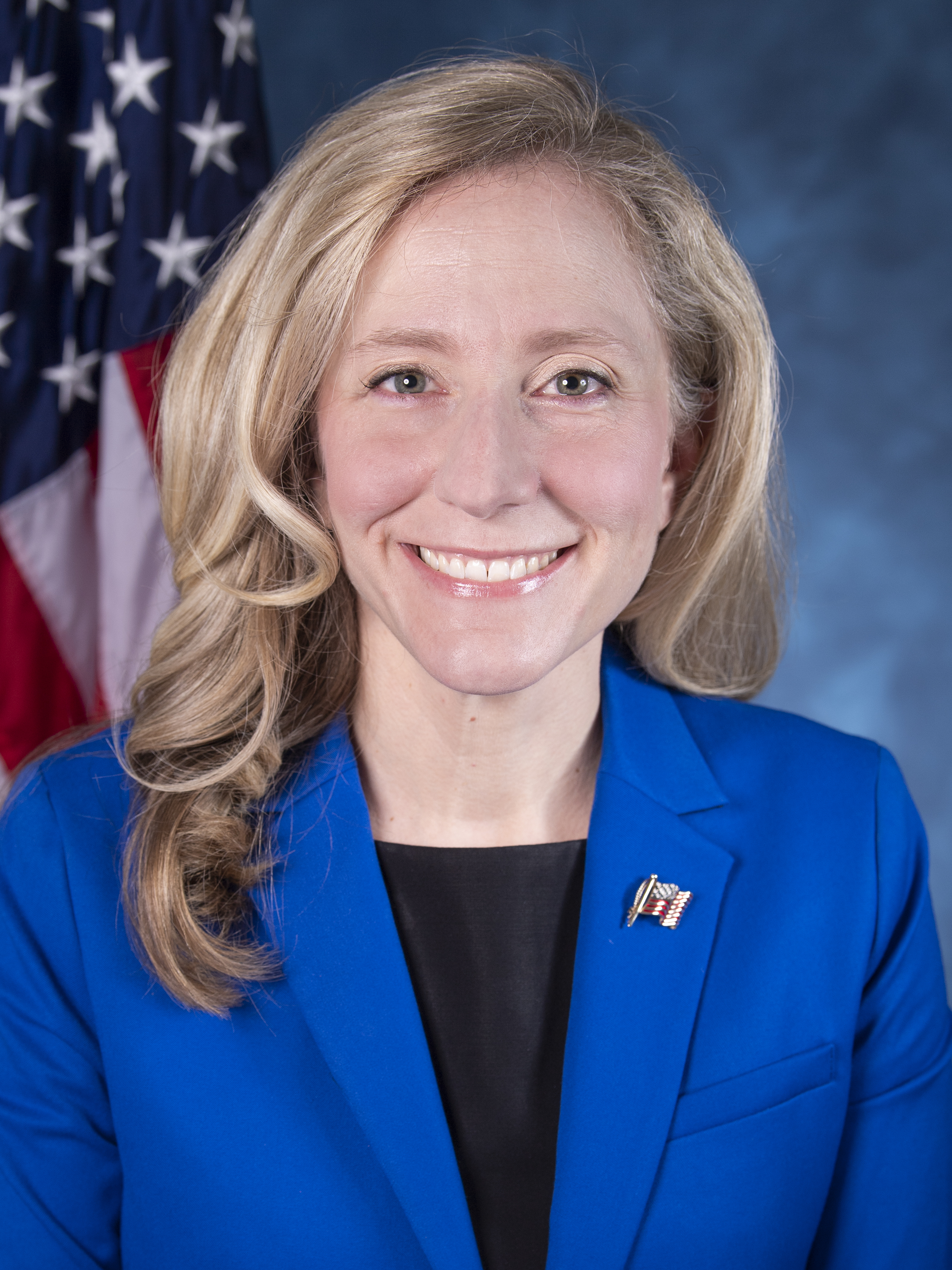

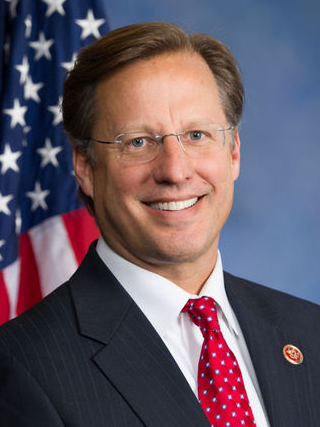
Nominee	Abigail Spanberger	Dave Brat
Party	Democratic	Republican
Popular vote	176,079	169,295
Percentage	50.3%	48.4%
- Spanberger: 50–60% 60–70% 70–80% 80–90% >90% Brat: 50–60% 60–70% 70–80%
U.S. Representative before election
Dave Brat
Republican
Elected U.S. Representative
Abigail Spanberger
Democratic

Incumbent Republican Dave Brat, who had represented the district since 2014, ran for re-election. He was re-elected with 58% of the vote in 2016. The district had a PVI of R+6.

=== Republican primary ===
==== Candidates ====
===== Nominee =====
- David Brat, incumbent U.S. representative

=== Democratic primary ===
==== Candidates ====
===== Nominee =====
- Abigail Spanberger, former CIA operations officer

===== Eliminated in primary =====
- Dan Ward, former U.S. Marine Corps EA-6B Prowler pilot

===== Withdrawn =====
- Helen Alli, Army veteran and small business owner
- Janelle Noble
- Joseph B. Walton

==== Results ====
County and independent city results Spanberger: 50–60%; 70–80%; Ward: 50–60%

Democratic primary results
Party	Candidate	Votes	%
Democratic	Abigail Spanberger	33,210	72.7
Democratic	Daniel Ward	12,483	27.3
Total votes		45,693	100.0

=== Libertarian primary ===
==== Candidates ====
===== Nominee =====
- Joe Walton, former chair of the Powhatan Board of Supervisors

=== General election ===
Helen Alli originally was going to run as a Democrat but failed to turn in enough signatures. She was then nominated by the Modern Whig Party, but again failed to turn in enough signatures. She finally ran as a write-in candidate.

==== Debate ====
2018 Virginia's 7th congressional district debate
No.	Date	Host	Moderator	Link	Republican	Democratic
Key: P Participant A Absent N Not invited I Invited W Withdrawn						
Key: P Participant A Absent N Not invited I Invited W Withdrawn					Dave Brat	Abigail Spanberger
1	Oct. 15, 2018	Culpeper Media Network	Jonathan Krawchuk		P	P

==== Polling ====
Poll source	Date(s) administered	Sample size	Margin of error	Dave Brat (R)	Abigail Spanberger (D)	Joe Walton (L)	Undecided
NYT Upshot/Siena College	October 30 – November 4, 2018	500	± 4.6%	46%	44%	2%	9%
Christopher Newport University	October 18–27, 2018	871	± 4.2%	45%	46%	4%	3%
Monmouth University	September 15–24, 2018	329 LV	± 5.4%	47%	47%	<1%	6%
Monmouth University	September 15–24, 2018	400 RV	± 4.9%	42%	47%	2%	9%
Normington, Petts & Associates (D)	September 18–20, 2018	400	± 4.9%	47%	47%	–	6%
NYT Upshot/Siena College	September 10–11, 2018	501	± 5.0%	47%	43%	–	9%

==== Predictions ====
Source	Ranking	As of
The Cook Political Report	Tossup	November 5, 2018
Inside Elections	Tossup	November 5, 2018
Sabato's Crystal Ball	Lean D (flip)	November 5, 2018
RCP	Tossup	November 5, 2018
Daily Kos	Tossup	November 5, 2018
538	Tossup	November 7, 2018
CNN	Tossup	October 31, 2018
Politico	Tossup	November 4, 2018

==== Results ====
Virginia's 7th congressional district, 2018
Party	Candidate	Votes	%
Democratic	Abigail Spanberger	176,079	50.3
Republican	Dave Brat (incumbent)	169,295	48.4
Libertarian	Joe Walton	4,216	1.2
Write-in		155	0.1
Total votes		349,745	100.0
Democratic gain from Republican			

== District 8 ==
2018 Virginia's 8th congressional district election
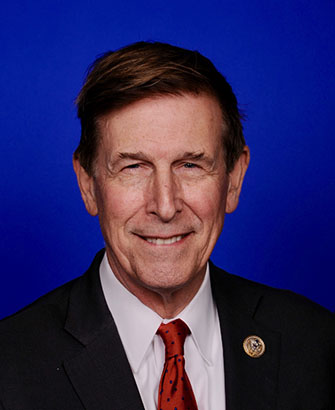

Nominee	Don Beyer	Thomas Oh
Party	Democratic	Republican
Popular vote	247,137	76,899
Percentage	76.1%	23.7%
- Beyer: 50–60% 60–70% 70–80% 80–90%
U.S. Representative before election
Don Beyer
Democratic
Elected U.S. Representative
Don Beyer
Democratic

Incumbent Democrat Don Beyer, who had represented the district since 2015, ran for re-election. He was re-elected with 68% of the vote in 2016. The district had a PVI of D+21.

=== Democratic primary ===
==== Candidates ====
===== Nominee =====
- Don Beyer, incumbent U.S. representative

=== Republican primary ===
==== Candidates ====
===== Nominee =====
- Thomas Oh, federal contractor

=== General election ===
==== Predictions ====
Source	Ranking	As of
The Cook Political Report	Safe D	November 5, 2018
Inside Elections	Safe D	November 5, 2018
Sabato's Crystal Ball	Safe D	November 5, 2018
RCP	Safe D	November 5, 2018
Daily Kos	Safe D	November 5, 2018
538	Safe D	November 7, 2018
CNN	Safe D	October 31, 2018
Politico	Safe D	November 4, 2018

==== Results ====
Virginia's 8th congressional district, 2018
Party	Candidate	Votes	%
Democratic	Don Beyer (incumbent)	247,137	76.1
Republican	Thomas Oh	76,899	23.7
Write-in		712	0.2
Total votes		324,748	100.0
Democratic hold			

== District 9 ==
2018 Virginia's 9th congressional district election
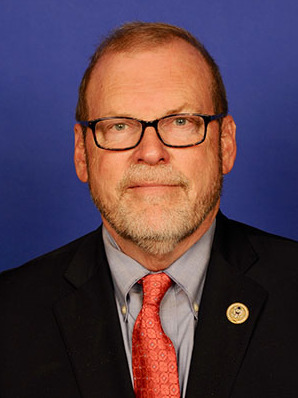

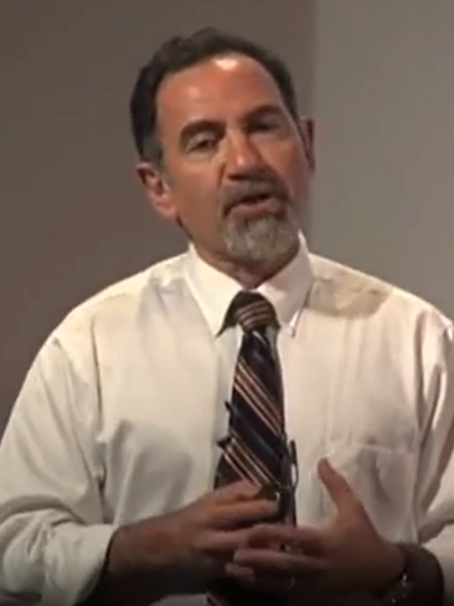
Nominee	Morgan Griffith	Anthony Flaccavento
Party	Republican	Democratic
Popular vote	160,933	85,833
Percentage	65.2%	34.7%
- Griffith: 50–60% 60–70% 70–80% 80–90% Flaccavento: 50–60% 60–70% 70–80% >90%
U.S. Representative before election
Morgan Griffith
Republican
Elected U.S. Representative
Morgan Griffith
Republican

Incumbent Republican Morgan Griffith, who had represented the district since 2011, ran for re-election. He was re-elected with 65% of the vote in 2016. The district had a PVI of R+19.

=== Republican primary ===
==== Candidates ====
===== Nominee =====
- Morgan Griffith, incumbent U.S. representative

=== Democratic primary ===
==== Candidates ====
===== Nominee =====
- Anthony Flaccavento, farmer, sustainability consultant and nominee for this seat in 2012

===== Eliminated in primary =====
- Justin Santopietro

==== Results ====
Democratic primary results
Party	Candidate	Votes	%
Democratic	Anthony Flaccavento	10,756	78.6
Democratic	Justin Santopietro	2,921	21.4
Total votes		13,677	100.0

=== Independents ===
==== Candidates ====
- Scott Blankenship

=== General election ===
==== Predictions ====
Source	Ranking	As of
The Cook Political Report	Safe R	November 5, 2018
Inside Elections	Safe R	November 5, 2018
Sabato's Crystal Ball	Safe R	November 5, 2018
RCP	Safe R	November 5, 2018
Daily Kos	Safe R	November 5, 2018
538	Safe R	November 7, 2018
CNN	Safe R	October 31, 2018
Politico	Safe R	November 4, 2018

==== Polling ====
Poll source	Date(s) administered	Sample size	Margin of error	Morgan Griffith (R)	Anthony Flaccavento (D)	Other	Undecided
Thirty-Ninth Street Strategies (D-Flaccavento)	June 24–28, 2018	400	± 4.9%	48%	41%	4%	7%

==== Results ====
Virginia's 9th congressional district, 2018
Party	Candidate	Votes	%
Republican	Morgan Griffith (incumbent)	160,933	65.2
Democratic	Anthony Flaccavento	85,833	34.7
Write-in		214	0.1
Total votes		246,980	100.0
Republican hold			

== District 10 ==
2018 Virginia's 10th congressional district election
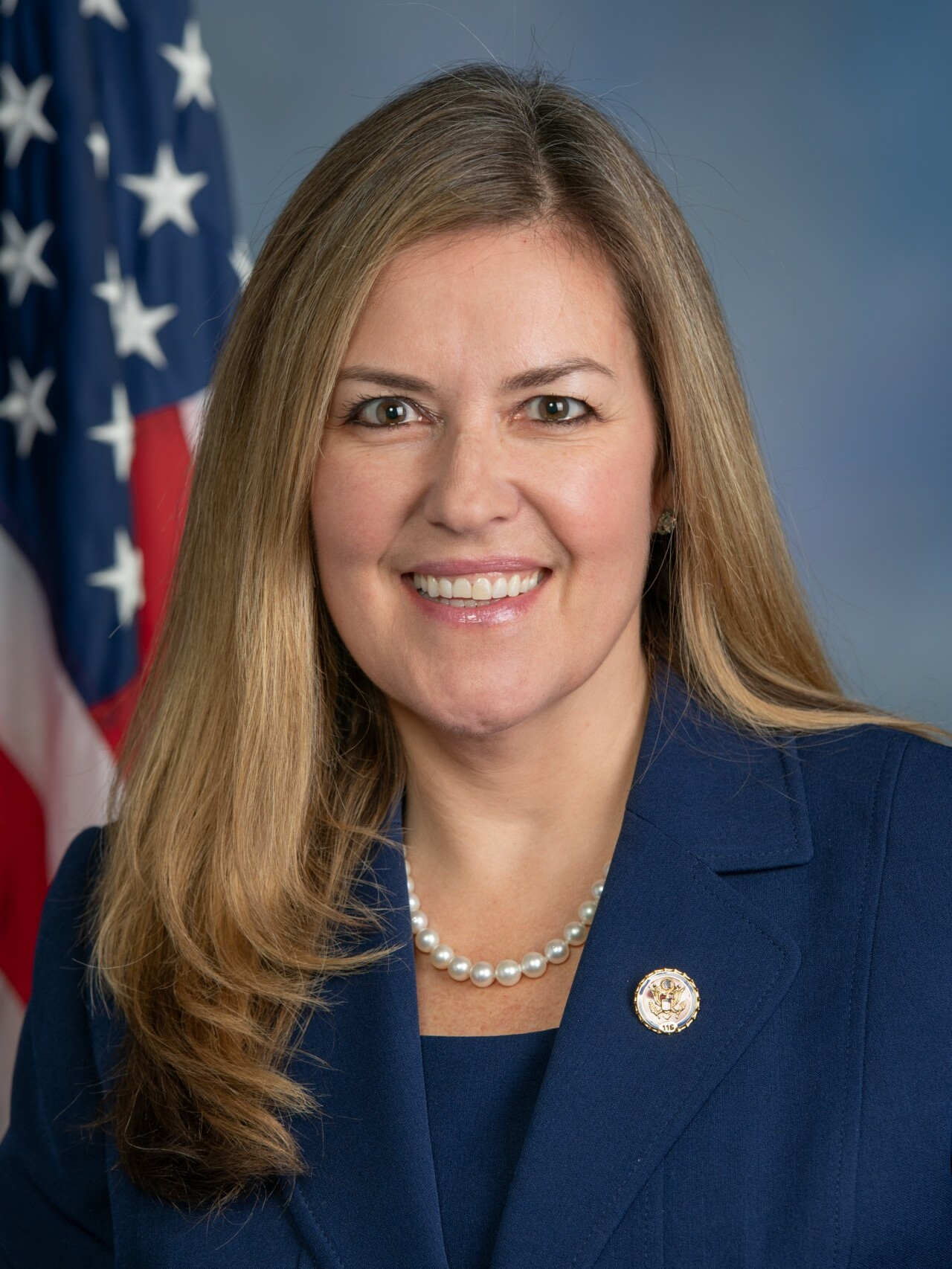

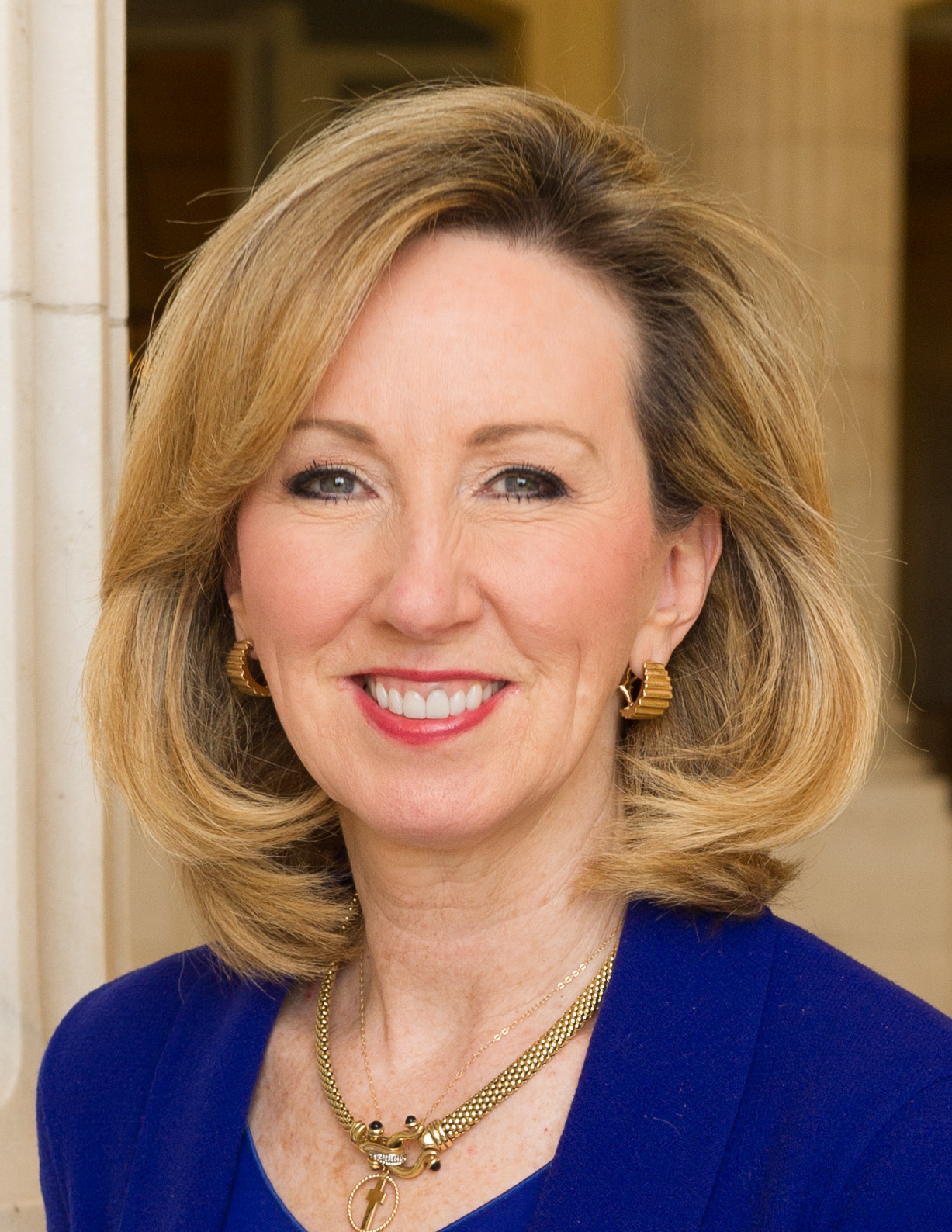
Candidate	Jennifer Wexton	Barbara Comstock
Party	Democratic	Republican
Popular vote	206,356	160,841
Percentage	56.1%	43.7%
- Wexton: 40–50% 50–60% 60–70% 70–80% Comstock: 50–60% 60–70% 70–80%
U.S. Representative before election
Barbara Comstock
Republican
Elected U.S. Representative
Jennifer Wexton
Democratic

Incumbent Republican Barbara Comstock, who had represented the district since 2015, ran for re-election. She was re-elected with 53% of the vote in 2016. The district had a PVI of D+1.

Six Democratic candidates, encouraged by the fact that Republican incumbent Barbara Comstock's district voted for Hillary Clinton in the 2016 U.S. presidential election, submitted the required number of signatures to run for that seat. Republicans believed, however, that given that Comstock was an excellent fundraiser and fierce campaigner, she would be able to keep the seat. April polling was favorable to a generic Democrat against Comstock, although Comstock performed much better in polling when her name was on the ballot against a named Democratic opponent.

=== Republican primary ===
==== Candidates ====
===== Nominee =====
- Barbara Comstock, incumbent U.S. representative

===== Eliminated in primary =====
- Shak Hill, combat pilot

==== Results ====
County and independent city results Comstock: 50–60%; 60–70%; Hill: 50–60%

Republican primary results
Party	Candidate	Votes	%
Republican	Barbara Comstock (incumbent)	28,287	60.7
Republican	Shak Hill	18,311	39.3
Total votes		46,598	100.0

=== Democratic primary ===
==== Candidates ====
===== Nominee =====
- Jennifer Wexton, state senator

===== Eliminated in primary =====
- Julia Biggins, scientist
- Lindsey Davis Stover, senior advisor to Barack Obama's Veterans Affairs Secretary Eric K. Shinseki
- Alison Friedman, former State Department official
- Dan Helmer, Army veteran
- Paul Pelletier, federal prosecutor

===== Withdrawn =====
- Kimberly Adams, teacher and former president of the Fairfax County Education Association
- Shadi Ayyas, physician
- David Hanson
- Julien Modica, former president of the JMA Foundation
- Michael Pomerleano, retired banker
- Deep Sran, teacher, tech entrepreneur and lawyer

===== Declined =====
- Dorothy McAuliffe, attorney and former First Lady of the Commonwealth of Virginia

==== Results ====
County and independent city results Wexton: 30–40%; 40–50%; Davis Stover: 20–30%; 30–40%; 40–50%

Democratic primary results
Party	Candidate	Votes	%
Democratic	Jennifer Wexton	22,405	41.9
Democratic	Alison Friedman	12,283	23.0
Democratic	Lindsey Davis Stover	8,567	16.0
Democratic	Dan Helmer	6,712	12.5
Democratic	Paul Pelletier	2,010	3.8
Democratic	Julia Biggins	1,513	2.8
Total votes		53,490	100.0

=== General election ===
==== Campaign ====
Patriarchist libertarian Nathan Larson filed to run as an independent, but then withdrew his candidacy on August 13 and endorsed Wexton, calling her "the accelerationist choice"; Wexton, through a spokesman, declined the endorsement. Comstock tweeted, "It is good news for all voters in the 10th District that Nathan Larson, a convicted felon who served time in prison for threatening to kill the President and is an admitted pedophile, an admitted rapist, white supremacist, and misogynist, is now off the ballot in the 10th Congressional District."

==== Debate ====
2018 Virginia's 10th congressional district debate
No.	Date	Host	Moderator	Link	Republican	Democratic
Key: P Participant A Absent N Not invited I Invited W Withdrawn						
Key: P Participant A Absent N Not invited I Invited W Withdrawn					Barbara Comstock	Jennifer Wexton
1	Sep. 21, 2018	Loudoun County; Chamber of Commerce			P	P

==== Polling ====
Poll source	Date(s) administered	Sample size	Margin of error	Barbara Comstock (R)	Jennifer Wexton (D)	Other	Undecided
Washington Post/Schar School	October 25–28, 2018	446	± 6.5%	43%	54%	1%	2%
Washington Post/Schar School	October 15–21, 2018	430	± 6.5%	43%	56%	–	1%
NYT Upshot/Siena College	October 11–15, 2018	484	± 4.8%	41%	48%	–	11%
Global Strategy Group (D)	October 7–9, 2018	400	± 4.9%	39%	49%	–	–
McLaughlin & Associates (R-Comstock)	October 6–8, 2018	400	± 4.9%	48%	47%	–	5%
Washington Post/Schar School	September 19 – October 5, 2018	866	± 4.0%	43%	55%	–	2%
Christopher Newport University	September 23 – October 2, 2018	794	± 4.1%	44%	51%	–	5%
Monmouth University	September 26–30, 2018	374	± 5.1%	44%	50%	<1%	5%
Monmouth University	June 21–24, 2018	338 LV	± 5.3%	41%	50%	3%	6%
Monmouth University	June 21–24, 2018	400 RV	± 4.9%	39%	49%	2%	10%
DCCC (D)	March 20–21, 2018	400	–	43%	46%	–	–

Hypothetical polling

Poll source	Date(s) administered	Sample size	Margin of error	Barbara Comstock (R)	"Democratic opponent"	Other	Undecided
Public Policy Polling (D)	October 4–7, 2017	669	± 3.8%	39%	48%	—	13%

==== Predictions ====
Source	Ranking	As of
The Cook Political Report	Lean D (flip)	November 5, 2018
Inside Elections	Tilt D (flip)	November 5, 2018
Sabato's Crystal Ball	Lean D (flip)	November 5, 2018
RCP	Lean D (flip)	November 5, 2018
Daily Kos	Lean D (flip)	November 5, 2018
538	Likely D (flip)	November 7, 2018
CNN	Lean D (flip)	October 31, 2018
Politico	Lean D (flip)	November 4, 2018

==== Results ====
Virginia's 10th congressional district, 2018
Party	Candidate	Votes	%
Democratic	Jennifer Wexton	206,356	56.1
Republican	Barbara Comstock (incumbent)	160,841	43.7
Write-in		598	0.2
Total votes		367,795	100.0
Democratic gain from Republican			

== District 11 ==
2018 Virginia's 11th congressional district election
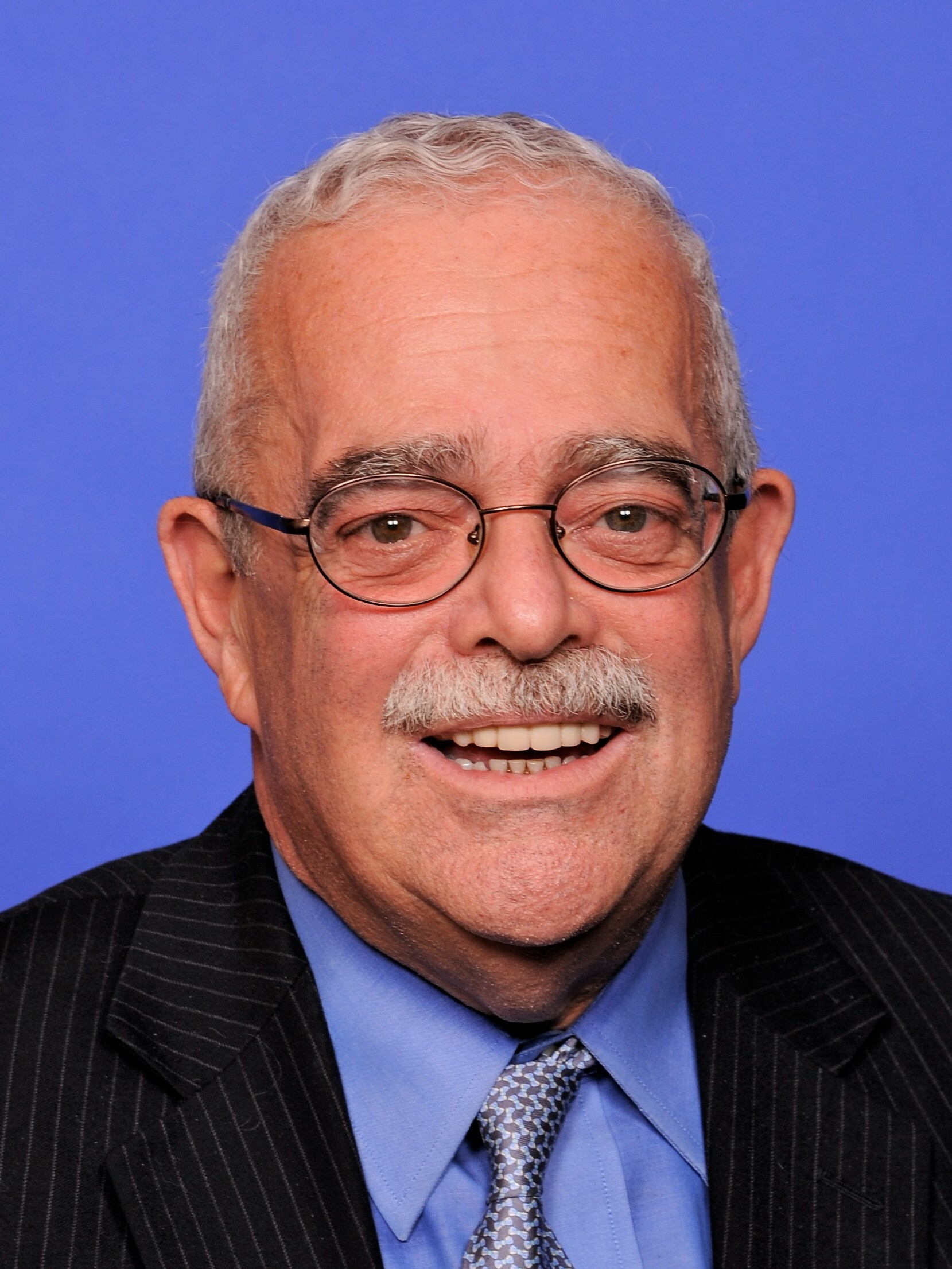

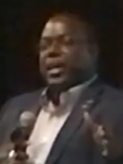
Nominee	Gerry Connolly	Jeff Dove
Party	Democratic	Republican
Popular vote	219,191	83,023
Percentage	71.1%	26.9%
- Connolly: 50–60% 60–70% 70–80% 80–90% >90%
U.S. Representative before election
Gerry Connolly
Democratic
Elected U.S. Representative
Gerry Connolly
Democratic

Incumbent Democrat Gerry Connolly, who had represented the district since 2009, ran for re-election. He was re-elected with 88% of the vote in 2016. The district had a PVI of D+15.

=== Democratic primary ===
==== Candidates ====
===== Nominee =====
- Gerry Connolly, incumbent U.S. representative

===== Withdrawn =====
- Jonathan Park

=== Republican primary ===
==== Candidates ====
===== Nominee =====
- Jeff Dove, U.S. Army veteran

=== Libertarian primary ===
==== Candidates ====
===== Nominee =====
- Stevan Porter

=== General election ===
==== Predictions ====
Source	Ranking	As of
The Cook Political Report	Safe D	November 5, 2018
Inside Elections	Safe D	November 5, 2018
Sabato's Crystal Ball	Safe D	November 5, 2018
RCP	Safe D	November 5, 2018
Daily Kos	Safe D	November 5, 2018
538	Safe D	November 7, 2018
CNN	Safe D	October 31, 2018
Politico	Safe D	November 4, 2018

==== Results ====
Virginia's 11th congressional district, 2018
Party	Candidate	Votes	%
Democratic	Gerry Connolly (incumbent)	219,191	71.1
Republican	Jeff Dove	83,023	26.9
Libertarian	Stevan Porter	5,546	1.8
Write-in		506	0.2
Total votes		308,266	100.0
Democratic hold			

== See also ==
- 2018 Virginia elections
