= Virginia's 36th House of Delegates district =

Virginia legislative district

Virginia's 36th State House of Delegates district
- District map from the 2023 election
Delegate
| Ellen McLaughlin; R |
- Demographics: 82% White; 7% Black; 5% Hispanic; 1% Asian; 0% Native American; 0% Hawaiian/Pacific Islander; 0% Other; 4% Multiracial
- Population (2024) • Voting age: 86,398; 18
- Registered voters: 64,638

Virginia's 36th House of Delegates district elects one of 100 seats in the Virginia House of Delegates, the lower house of the state's bicameral legislature. It is currently represented by Republican Ellen McLaughlin. It includes parts of Augusta and Rockingham counties as well as the independent cities of Staunton and Waynesboro.

Prior to redistricting in 2021, District 36 represented part of Fairfax County, including all of Reston and parts of Herndon and Vienna. It was strongly Democratic compared to Virginia as a whole. 1 in 6 residents was Asian, compared to the statewide average of 1 in 16. The district lines were redrawn in 2011 and 2019. Prior to redistricting the seat was held by Kenneth R. Plum.

== District officeholders ==
| Years | Delegate | Party | Electoral history |
|---|---|---|---|
| January 12, 1983 – January 10, 2024 | Kenneth R. Plum | Democratic | Chair of the Democratic Party of Virginia (1998–2000) |
| January 10, 2024 – present | Ellen Campbell | Republican | Delegate for 24th district (2023–2024) |
