= Ellen McLaughlin (politician) =

American politician

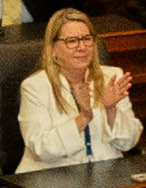

Member of the Virginia House of Delegates
- Incumbent
- Assumed office January 11, 2023
- Preceded by: Ronnie R. Campbell
- Constituency: 24th district (2023–2024); 36th district (2024–present)

Personal details
- Party: Republican
- Spouse: Ronnie R. Campbell

Ellen Hamilton McLaughlin, formerly Ellen Campbell, is an American politician who is the delegate for Virginia's 36th House of Delegates district. She began serving after winning a 2023 special election to replace her husband Ronnie R. Campbell, who died of cancer on December 13, 2022.

== Political career ==
Ellen's husband, Ronnie R. Campbell, who represented the 24th district in the Virginia House of Delegates, died of cancer on December 13, 2022. Ellen ran in the special election to fill the seat for the remainder of her husband's term. She won the election, held January 10, 2023, against Democrat Jade D. Harris. She was sworn in on January 11, 2023.

== Electoral history ==
2023 Virginia's 24th House of Delegates district special election
Party	Candidate	Votes	%
Republican	Ellen H. Campbell	6,425	62.46
Democratic	Jade D. Harris	3,842	37.35
Write-in		20	0.19
Total votes		10,287	100.0
Republican hold			
