= Ronnie R. Campbell =

American politician (1954–2022)

Ronnie Campbell

Member of the Virginia House of Delegates from the 24th district
- In office January 2, 2019 – December 13, 2022
- Preceded by: Ben Cline
- Succeeded by: Ellen Campbell

Personal details
- Born: February 16, 1954 Waynesboro, Virginia, U.S.
- Died: December 13, 2022 (aged 68)
- Party: Republican
- Spouse: Ellen Campbell
- Children: 5
- Education: East Tennessee State University; Virginia Commonwealth University

Ronnie Ray Campbell (February 16, 1954 – December 13, 2022) was an American politician who served as a member of the Virginia House of Delegates, first elected in a special election in 2018. Campbell represented the 24th district comprising Rockbridge and Bath Counties, parts of Amherst and Augusta Counties, and the independent cities of Lexington and Buena Vista.

== Early life and career ==
Campbell was born, on February 16, 1954, in Waynesboro, Virginia. He received a bachelor's degree from East Tennessee State University in 1976, majoring in criminal science. After that, he became a Virginia State Police officer, working in Northern Virginia.

== Political career ==
Campbell spent ten years on the Rockbridge County School Board. In 2012, he was elected to the Rockbridge County Board of Supervisors.

In November 2018, 24th district state delegate Ben Cline was elected to the United States House of Representatives, triggering a special election for his state house seat. The local Republican party held a firehouse primary to choose their nominee. Campbell won the primary by a one-vote margin, defeating Amherst County Supervisor Jimmy Ayers and two other candidates. In the December 2018 special election, Campbell defeated lawyer and activist Christian Worth by a 59% to 40% margin.

Campbell was sworn into office on January 2, 2019, a week before the 2019 legislative session started.

== 2020–21 United States election protests ==
Campbell was one of three GOP delegates in Virginia that sent a letter to Vice President Pence asking him to delay the certification of the state's election results, which gave President-elect Joe Biden the win and Virginia's 13 electoral votes, until an audit of the election could be completed. The letter included two co-signers, Del. Dave LaRock (R-Loudoun) and Del. Mark Cole (R-Spotsylvania), requesting “a stay of any designation of Presidential Electors from our state until such time as a comprehensive forensic audit of the November 3, 2020, election has taken place to determine the actual winner.” On January 13, a Virginia Circuit Court issued a consent order agreeing with one of the major points of the letter, that the conduct of the 2020 election was contrary to Virginia law.

== Personal life and death ==
Campbell died of cancer on December 13, 2022, at the age of 68. Campbell was succeeded in the House of Delegates by his wife Ellen, who won a January 2023 special election. They had five children.
