= Ben Cline =

American politician (born 1972)

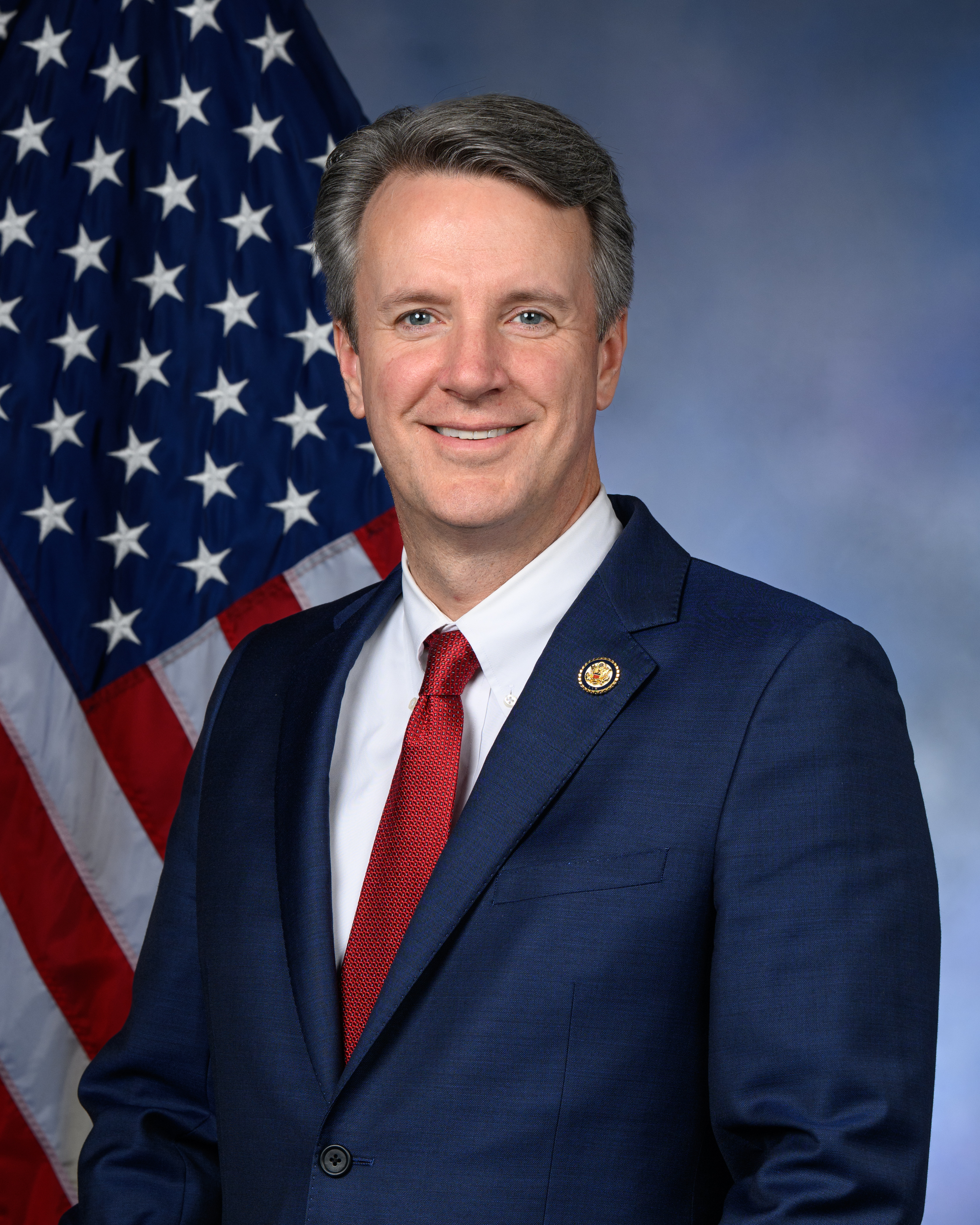
- Official portrait, 2025

Member of the U.S. House of Representatives from Virginia's 6th district
- Incumbent
- Assumed office January 3, 2019
- Preceded by: Bob Goodlatte

Member of the Virginia House of Delegates from the 24th district
- In office November 26, 2002 – December 18, 2018
- Preceded by: Vance Wilkins
- Succeeded by: Ronnie Campbell

Personal details
- Born: Benjamin Lee Cline; February 29, 1972 (age 54) Stillwater, Oklahoma, U.S.
- Party: Republican
- Spouse: Elizabeth Rocovich (m. 2007)
- Children: 2
- Education: Bates College (BA); University of Richmond (JD)
- Website: House website Campaign website

Benjamin Lee Cline (born February 29, 1972) is an American politician and lawyer serving as the U.S. representative for Virginia's 6th congressional district since 2019. A member of the Republican Party, he represented the 24th district in the Virginia House of Delegates from 2002 to 2018.

== Early life and education ==
Cline was born on February 29, 1972, in Stillwater, Oklahoma, and grew up in Rockbridge County, Virginia. He is the son of Philip L. Cline and Julie Cline.

Cline graduated from Lexington High School in 1990, and graduated with a B.A. from Bates College in 1994. He earned a J.D. degree from University of Richmond School of Law in 2007.

== Career outside of politics ==
From 2002 to 2007, including his years in law school, Cline was president of NDS Corporation, a Virginia-based company providing sales and marketing assistance to rural Internet and technology businesses. After graduating from law school, he served as an assistant Commonwealth's Attorney for Rockingham County and the city of Harrisonburg until 2013. Before his election to Congress, Cline maintained a private law practice in Lexington, Harrisonburg, and Amherst.

== Political career ==
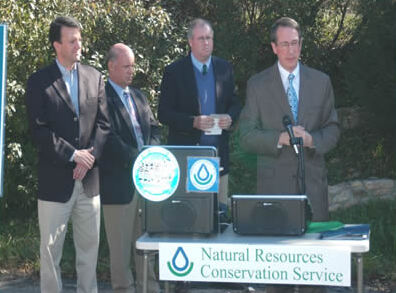
Cline with Bob Goodlatte in October 2005

Cline worked on Capitol Hill from 1994-2002 for U.S. Representative Bob Goodlatte. During his tenure with his predecessor, he rose from legislative correspondent to become Rep. Goodlatte's chief of staff.

Cline began his political career in 2002 in a special election to the Virginia House of Delegates, replacing incumbent delegate Vance Wilkins, who resigned due to sexual harassment allegations. Cline won with 57% of the vote against Democratic former Lexington mayor Mimi Elrod. Cline represented the 24th district, which consisted of Bath and Rockbridge counties, the cities of Buena Vista and Lexington, and parts of Amherst and Augusta counties.

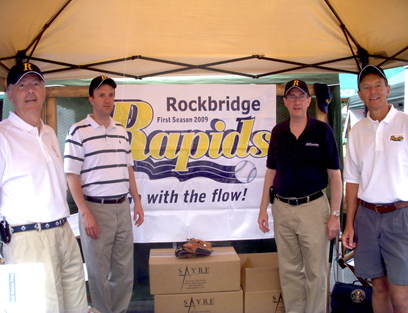
Cline and Bob Goodlatte at the Rockbridge Community Festival in August 2008

In 2003, Cline won again with 69% of the vote against independent E. W. Sheffield. In 2005, he won with 62% of the vote against Democrat David Cox. Cline ran unopposed in 2007. In 2009, Cline ran against Democratic Amherst native Jeff Price and won with 71% of the vote, taking the Lexington City precinct for the first time since Price's election in 2002 and every precinct in the 24th House of Delegates district. Cline ran unopposed in both 2011 and 2013. In 2015, Cline won 71% of the vote against Democrat Ellen Arthur. In 2017, he was reelected with 72% of the vote against independent candidate John Winfrey.

In November 2017, Cline announced he would run for Congress in Virginia's 6th congressional district in 2018 for the seat being vacated by retiring incumbent Bob Goodlatte. On May 19, 2018, Cline won the Republican nomination on the first ballot at the district convention.

Cline won the election on November 6, 2018, winning 15 Virginia localities, but with a historically low 59.8% versus Democrat Jennifer Lewis. He resigned from the Virginia House of Delegates on December 18, 2018.

== State legislative career ==
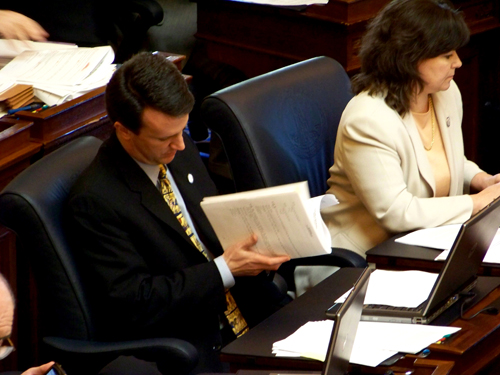
Cline in the House Chamber next to state delegate Terrie Suit

=== Committee assignments ===
Cline served on the House of Delegates Committees on Commerce and Labor, Courts of Justice, Finance, and chaired the Militia, Police and Public Safety. He was also a member of Commerce and Labor Subcommittee #2, Commerce and Labor Special Subcommittee on Energy, Courts of Justice Subcommittee on Criminal Law, Courts of Justice Subcommittee on Judicial Systems and Finance Subcommittee #2. Cline also co-chaired the Virginia Joint Legislative Conservative Caucus, co-chaired in the Senate of Virginia by Mark Obenshain.

=== Government regulation ===
In 2006, Cline passed two bills, HB1130 and HB1131, that changed the administrative setup of the Virginia Department of Game and Inland Fisheries. In 2009, he passed HB2285, which created a searchable database of Virginia's agency expenditures. Additionally, Cline went after the Virginia Lottery in 2009 for the allotment of over $1 million of state funds to use the likeness of Howie Mandel and Donald Trump on lottery tickets.

=== Public safety ===
Cline was named Legislator of the Year by the Virginia Court Clerks' Association in 2011 and by the Virginia Sheriff's Association in 2012.

Cline also introduced several bills regarding the rights of defendants and inmates. In 2003, he introduced HB2231, which gives probation officers greater access to juvenile defendants' records so that risk assessments could be more easily prepared. In 2009 he opposed the closure of the Natural Bridge Juvenile Correctional Center, the last remaining facility solely for nonviolent offenders in the Commonwealth of Virginia at the time of its closing, and introduced HB873 in 2010 to require the Department of Juvenile Justice to keep at least one facility open for nonviolent juvenile offenders. In 2012, Cline helped negotiate a compromise between law enforcement and prisoner advocates regarding HB836, which restricted the usage of restraints on pregnant inmates, by supporting the intent of the legislation in the form of a rule change by the Virginia Board of Corrections, winning praise locally for his involvement on the issue. In 2013, Cline helped craft and supported HB2103, which improves parole process for inmates still eligible for parole in Virginia.

=== Abortion ===
Carmen Forman of The Roanoke Times called Cline "staunchly anti-abortion." In 2007 and subsequent years, he introduced legislation requiring that information regarding the option of providing anesthesia to the baby be given to women seeking abortions after 20 weeks and requiring doctors to do so if requested by the mother.

== U.S. House of Representatives ==
=== Elections ===
==== 2018 ====
===== Convention =====
Cline announced his candidacy for the United States House of Representatives, in a bid to replace outgoing Representative Bob Goodlatte, for whom Cline had previously served as chief of staff. He entered a field of eight candidates, his top rival being Cynthia Dunbar, the incumbent RNC Committeewoman from Virginia.

The convention process was immediately tainted by accusations that the District Committee leadership was attempting to slant the convention in Dunbar's favor. 6th District Chairman Scott Sayre was heard admonishing the other candidates that their primary goal needed to be to defeat Cline. 6th District Vice Chair Matthew Tederick was a paid staffer for Dunbar, as were several other members of the District Committee.

Led by Dunbar supporters, the District Committee attempted to push through a "plurality" rule for the Congressional race so that whoever got the highest vote on the first ballot would win. In a field of eight candidates, that number could have been significantly lower than 51% (even as low as 20%), which elicited accusations that the District Committee thought that Dunbar couldn't beat Cline on her own merits. This rule was challenged to the State Central Committee of the Republican Party of Virginia and overturned by the SCC. It turned out to be unnecessary since Rockingham County Clerk of Court Chaz Haywood (another candidate) dropped out of the race at the Convention and endorsed Cline. With that endorsement, Cline received 52.62% of the vote to Dunbar's 39.15%.

The final tally was: Cline, 52.62%; Dunbar, 39.15%; Douglas Wright, 3.63%; Elliot Pope, 2.59%; Michael Desjadon, 1.19%; Eduardo Justo, 0.51%; Kathryn McDaniel Lewis, 0.25%, and Haywood, who appeared on the ballot despite his late withdrawal, 0.06%. With Cline winning a majority on the first ballot, he secured the nomination and moved on to the general election.

===== General election =====
According to Amy Friedenberger of The Roanoke Times, Cline established himself in his 16 years in the Virginia House of Delegates "as a conservative who opposes abortion rights and seeks to protect gun rights... [who said] he would take his fiscal conservatism to Washington." According to the Staunton News Leader, a USA Today newspaper in Cline's district, Cline's House campaign website detailed "his record of supporting conservative legislation in the House of Delegates... [where he] voted against a tax increase, helped make budget cuts to the state's 'bloated bureaucracy,' and sponsored legislation that would ban sanctuary cities". At his election victory celebration, Representative-elect Cline told his supporters, "Being part of the checks and balances that our Founding Fathers envisioned is a responsibility that I will guard seriously." In an interview as he arrived for his swearing in at the House, Cline described to a Staunton, Virginia, news reporter his 6th district as having 800,000 constituents in "19 cities and counties... each one [with] different character and different political affiliations".

==== 2020 ====
Cline was reelected in 2020 with 64.7% of the vote, defeating Democrat Nicholas Betts.

==== 2022 ====
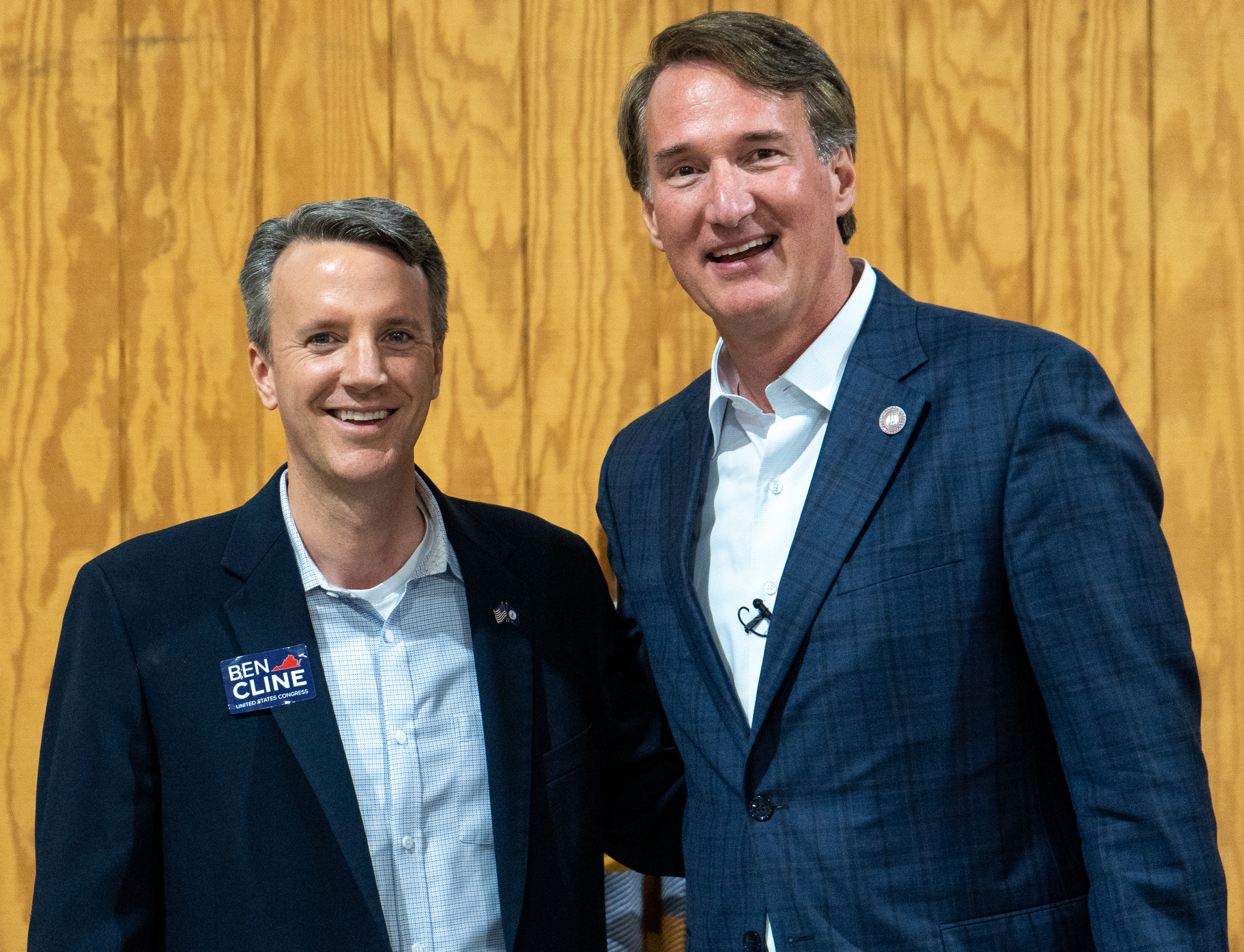
Cline with Governor Glenn Youngkin in 2022

Cline was reelected in 2022 with 64.4% of the vote, defeating Democrat Jennifer Lewis. The election took place in the newly redrawn 6th district following reapportionment.

=== Tenure ===
Cline's assignments in the House include serving on the Judiciary Committee, which includes some responsibilities regarding the Mueller Report.

On January 6, 2021, Cline voted against certifying the election of President-elect Joe Biden.

According to an algorithm developed by researchers at FiveThirtyEight, although Cline is a member of the bipartisan Problem Solvers Caucus, his voting record aligns more with "far-right obstructionists" like Marjorie Taylor Greene.

==== Israel ====
He voted to provide Israel with support following October 7 attacks.

==== LGBTQ rights ====
On July 15, 2026, Cline introduced the Daughters of the American Revolution Membership Integrity Act to the House of Representatives. The proposed legislation would restrict the Daughters of the American Revolution's federal charter to only permit membership to cisgender women. His proposed bill came after the organization voted on June 26, 2026, to continue to extend membership to transgender women.

=== Committee assignments ===
- Committee on Appropriations
  - Subcommittee on Commerce, Justice, Science, and Related Agencies
  - Subcommittee on Labor, Health and Human Services, Education, and Related Agencies
- Committee on the Budget

=== Caucus memberships ===
- Freedom Caucus
- Problem Solvers Caucus
- Republican Study Committee
- Rare Disease Caucus
- Congressional Western Caucus

== Electoral history ==
Virginia's 6th congressional district, 2018
Party	Candidate	Votes	%
Republican	Ben Cline	167,957	59.7
Democratic	Jennifer Lewis	113,133	40.2
Write-in		287	0.1
Total votes		281,377	100.0
Republican hold			

Virginia's 6th congressional district, 2020
Party	Candidate	Votes	%
Republican	Ben Cline (incumbent)	246,606	64.6
Democratic	Nicholas Betts	134,729	35.3
Write-in		478	0.1
Total votes		381,813	100.0
Republican hold			

Virginia's 6th congressional district, 2022
Party	Candidate	Votes	%
Republican	Ben Cline (incumbent)	173,352	64.4
Democratic	Jennifer Lewis	95,410	35.4
Write-in		472	0.2
Total votes		269,234	100.0
Republican hold			

Virginia's 6th congressional district, 2024
Party	Candidate	Votes	%
Republican	Ben Cline (incumbent)	256,933	63.1
Democratic	Ken Mitchell	141,612	34.8
Independent	Robby Wells	7,980	2.0
Write-in		510	0.1
Total votes		407,035	100.0
Republican hold			

== Personal life ==
Cline married Elizabeth Rocovich Cline in 2007; they have twin daughters. Since his election to Congress, he has moved from his longtime home in Rockbridge County, near Lexington, to Botetourt County. He is Catholic and attends St. Patrick's Church in Lexington.

U.S. House of Representatives
Preceded by Bob Goodlatte	Member of the U.S. House of Representatives from Virginia's 6th congressional district 2019–present	Incumbent
U.S. order of precedence (ceremonial)
Preceded by Sean Casten	United States representatives by seniority 192nd	Succeeded by Angie Craig
