= Liberal Women of Chesterfield County =

Facebook special-interest group

Liberal Women of Chesterfield County (LWCC) is a Facebook group of liberal women activists organized to support Democratic candidates in Chesterfield County, Virginia. LWCC's mission statement is: "LWCC strives to be a safe haven for liberal women and their allies to support, educate, and encourage one another to be actively involved in our government; and, furthermore, seeks to advance advocacy issues and campaigns that align with our progressive values of inclusivity and equal rights for all people."

== History ==
In 2016, poet and writer Kim Drew Wright founded Liberal Women of Chesterfield County. A graduate in journalism from the University of North Carolina - Chapel Hill, she worked in the field of advertising. She began and continues to be the administrator of the Facebook page for LWCC, coordinating the group's many meetings and events. Chesterfield County, where the Liberal Women of Chesterfield County group of activists is centered, is a suburb of Richmond, Virginia and part of Virginia's 1st and 4th congressional districts. Since the LWCC group is in the 1st and 4th Congressional Districts, a rural-suburban mix that stretches from Potomac Beach in the north, down south to the state line near Emporia, to Poquoson in the east, and just outside of Blackstone and South Hill to the west, and since the group membership grew to over 4000 people including some outside the district, it is sometimes called "Liberal Women of Chesterfield County - and Beyond."

LWCC engages in community volunteerism beyond politics. LWCC members have stocked the high school food go-home pantries of needy teens of Chesterfield County, participated in a "Adopt a Highway" highway clean-up project, and teamed up with local organization "Sylvia Sisters" to ensure that needy girls get feminine hygiene products both locally and in Uganda.

== Electoral activism ==
LWCC members met frequently to write and mail postcards to voters in the 1st and 4th Congressional Districts of Virginia in support of favored candidates. In the 2018 Virginia mid-term elections, candidates supported by this program were Chesterfield County Commonwealth's Attorney candidate Scott Miles, incumbent Senator Tim Kaine; and House of Representatives candidate Abigail Spanberger. One of the catalysts of activism was candidate Dave Brat's complaining that the women were "in his grill" at public appearances. Spanberger and Brat debated on October 15, 2018, a debate marked by the fact that Brat mentioned Nancy Pelosi 21 times.

The campaign, along with door-to-door canvassing, proved successful, as Scott Miles, Tim Kaine, and Abigail Spanberger were all elected.

Some current and past local and national candidates supported by LWCC members include Abigail Spanberger, Jenefer Hughes, Scott Miles, Wayne Powell, Jack Trammell, Ralph Northam, Hillary Clinton, Bernie Sanders, Mark Herring, Barack Obama, and Tim Kaine.

Democrat Jenefer Hughes challenged incumbent Republican Timothy McPeters in a special election to be Chesterfield Commissioner of Revenue and won by 55% of the vote. “Chesterfield County has changed. Chesterfield County is very balanced between Democrats and Republicans. And my election actually reflects that,” Hughes said. “It’s the first step to getting fair representation to 2019, when all the local offices come up for election.

== Equal Rights Amendment ==
Members of LWCC support many other active liberal progressive groups addressing issues such as the Equal Rights Amendment. LWCC is not a voting bloc, and efforts are underway to consider and promote the ERA as a non-partisan issue.
