= Virginia's 24th House of Delegates district =

Virginia legislative district

Virginia's 24th State House of Delegates district
- District map from the 2023 election
Delegate
Luke Torian; D–Woodbridge
- Demographics: 33% White; 22% Black; 26% Hispanic; 11% Asian; 0% Native American; 0% Hawaiian/Pacific Islander; 1% Other; 7% Multiracial
- Population • Voting age: 86,337; 18
- Registered voters: 59,128

Virginia's 24th House of Delegates district elects one of 100 seats in the Virginia House of Delegates, the lower house of the state's bicameral legislature. District 24 represents the cities of Buena Vista and Lexington; counties of Bath and Rockbridge; and parts of Amherst and Augusta counties. Benjamin L. Cline held this seat until his 2018 election to Virginia's 6th congressional district. In a Republican firehouse primary, Rockbridge supervisor Ronnie Campbell won the Republican nomination by one vote. Christian Worth won the Democratic nomination. Campbell won the special election on December 18 and held the seat for nearly four years until his death on December 13, 2022. Ellen Campbell was elected in a 2023 special election to succeed her husband.

== District officeholders ==
Years	Delegate	Party	Electoral history
1972 – 1974	Benjamin H. Woodbridge	Republican	Following a restricting in 1972, he served as the district's first delegate from 1972 to 1974.
January 1978 – January 13, 1982	Lewis P. Fickett Jr.	Democratic	
January 13, 1982 – January 12, 1983	Mitchell Van Yahres	Democratic	
January 12, 1983 – June 15, 2002	Vance Wilkins	Republican	Speaker of the Virginia House of Delegates (2000-02); Resigned due to sexual harassment allegations
November 26, 2002 – December 18, 2018	Ben Cline	Republican	Elected via special election Resigned due to election as Representative of Virginia's 6th congressional district
January 2, 2019 – December 13, 2022	Ronnie Campbell	Republican	Elected via special election after Ben Cline's election to Congress, Died in office on December 13, 2022.
December 13,2022 – January 10, 2024	Ellen McLaughlin	Republican	
January 10, 2024 – present	Luke Torian	Democrat	
