= Denver Riggleman =

American politician (born 1970)

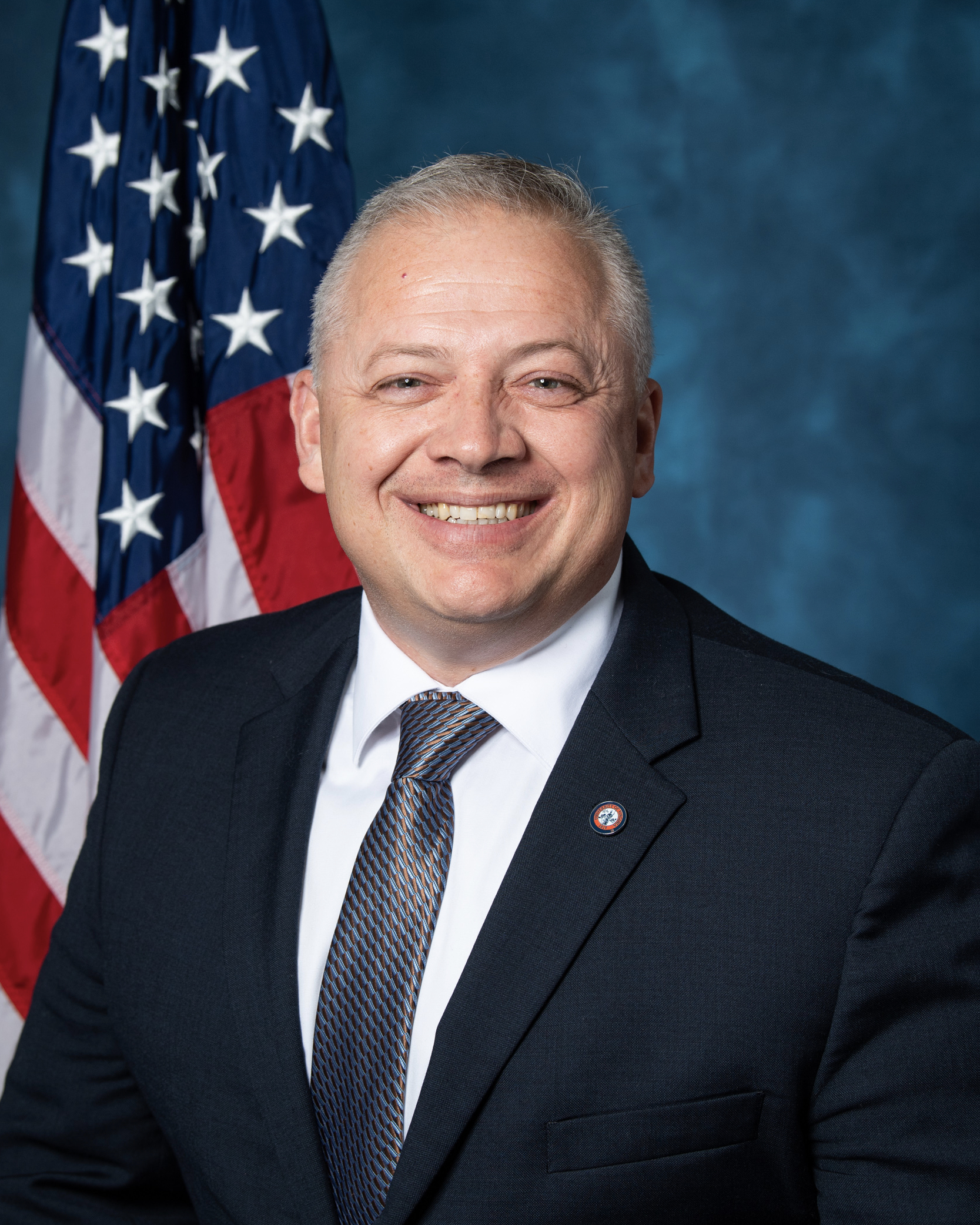
- Official portrait, 2018

Member of the U.S. House of Representatives from Virginia's 5th district
- In office January 3, 2019 – January 3, 2021
- Preceded by: Tom Garrett
- Succeeded by: Bob Good

Personal details
- Born: Denver Lee Riggleman III; March 17, 1970 (age 56) Manassas, Virginia, U.S.
- Party: Republican (before 2022); Independent (2022–present)
- Spouse: Christine Blair (m. 1989)
- Children: 3
- Education: Rowan College, Burlington (AA); Air University (AAS); University of Virginia (BA); Villanova University (GrCert)

Military service
- Branch/service: United States Air Force
- Years of service: 1992–2007
- Unit: 366th Fighter Wing; 34th Bomb Squadron; National Security Agency

Denver Lee Riggleman III (born March 17, 1970) is an American businessman and former politician from Virginia who served as the United States representative for Virginia's 5th congressional district from 2019 to 2021. A former Air Force officer and National Security Agency contractor, Riggleman opened a craft distillery in Virginia in 2014. As a Republican, he ran for his party's nomination in the 2017 gubernatorial election, but withdrew from the race. Riggleman was elected to the United States House of Representatives in 2018. Riggleman was defeated in his bid for reelection in 2020, losing to Republican primary challenger Bob Good in a drive-through party convention. Riggleman co-authored a book with Hunter Walker titled The Breach, which was published in October 2022. The book detailed his work on the United States House Select Committee on the January 6 Attack.

== Early life and education ==
Riggleman was born and raised in Manassas, Virginia. He graduated from Stonewall Jackson High School in 1988. Riggleman earned an Associate of Arts from Rowan College at Burlington County, formerly Burlington County College, in 1996. He received an Associate of Applied Science in avionics systems from the Community College of the Air Force at Air University in 1996. In 1998, he graduated with a Bachelor of Arts in foreign affairs from the University of Virginia. Riggleman received a graduate certificate in project management from Villanova University in 2007.

== Career ==
Riggleman served in the Air Force for 15 years. After initially serving as an enlisted avionics technician, he received a commission and went on to serve as an intelligence officer.

Riggleman founded NSA contractor Analytics Warehouse, LLC, in 2007, and was its CEO until 2015.

In 2014, Riggleman and his wife opened Silverback Distillery, a 50-acre craft distillery in Afton, Virginia, outside Charlottesville. He has pushed for deregulation of distilleries in the state and changes to the Virginia Alcoholic Beverage Control Authority. Together with other distillers, the Rigglemans established a "loosely formed distillers guild" and hired a lobbyist. Riggleman has "criticized the state's alcohol and tax laws as unfairly harsh toward spirits producers and spoke[n] of a new 'whiskey rebellion.'"

== Early political career ==
=== Gubernatorial election ===
In December 2016, Riggleman filed papers to seek the Republican nomination for governor of Virginia in the 2017 gubernatorial election. His opponents in the Republican primary were former President George W. Bush counselor and Republican National Committee chairman Ed Gillespie, Prince William County Board of Supervisors chairman Corey Stewart, and state Senator Frank Wagner of Virginia Beach. Riggleman suspended his campaign on March 16, 2017.

Riggleman had expressed interest in running for Governor in 2021 as an independent or third-party candidate, citing his belief that the Republican Party of Virginia is broken.

== U.S. House of Representatives ==
=== Elections ===
==== 2018 ====
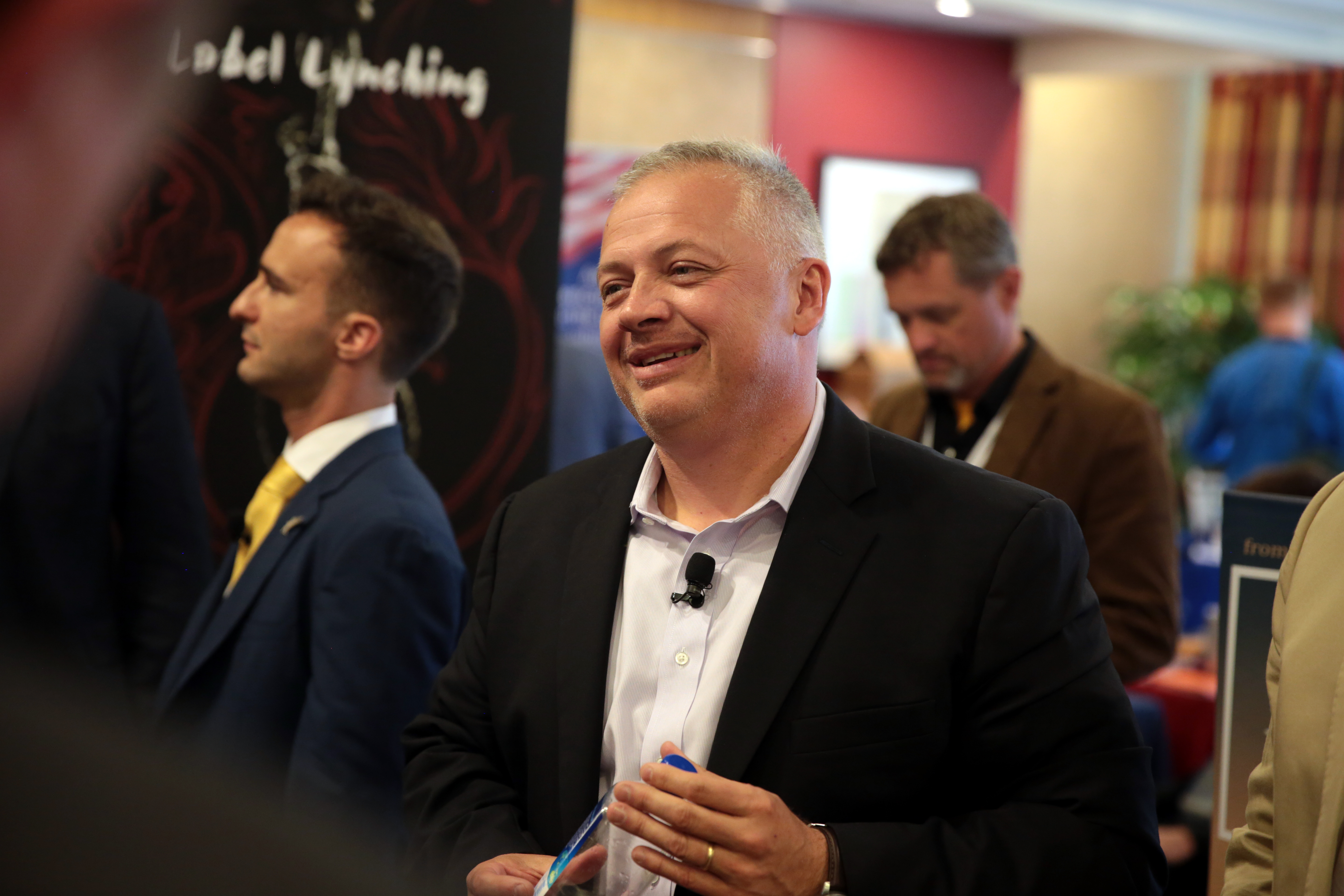
Riggleman speaking with attendees at the 2018 Young Americans for Liberty National Convention

In the 2018 elections, Riggleman was the Republican nominee for the United States House of Representatives election for Virginia's 5th congressional district. He defeated Cynthia Dunbar, who had lost the Republican nomination in the 6th district just weeks before, in the final round of voting to win the nomination. The Republican incumbent, Tom Garrett, did not run for reelection.

In the November 2018 general election, Riggleman defeated Democratic nominee Leslie Cockburn with 53% of the vote to Cockburn's 47%.

===== Interest in Bigfoot =====
During the campaign, Cockburn accused Riggleman of being a "devotee of Bigfoot erotica", based on an image he shared from his Instagram to promote a book titled The Mating Habits of Bigfoot and Why Women Want Him. In an interview with CRTV Riggleman said the image was an obvious joke, but that he had an interest in Bigfoot, and co-authored the actual self-published book Bigfoot Exterminators, Inc.: The Partially Cautionary, Mostly True Tale of Monster Hunt 2006, with ESPN writer Don Barone. In a phone interview with The Washington Post, he clarified that it was an "anthropological book sort of based on parody and satire" and said, "I thought it was funny. There is no way that anybody's dumb enough to think this is real."

In 2020, Riggleman released a book titled Bigfoot… It's Complicated, and described himself as a "Bigfoot scholar." Despite that, he does not believe in the creature's existence.

===== QAnon =====
Riggleman is the only member of the Republican party to speak on the House of Representatives floor against QAnon. He is a co-sponsor of 2020 US House resolution H. Res 1154 "Condemning QAnon and rejecting the conspiracy theories it promotes". He is also one of the co-authors of the Network Contagion Research Institute (affiliated with Rutgers University) report called "THE QANON CONSPIRACY: Destroying Families, Dividing Communities, Undermining Democracy" which he wrote before the January 6, 2021 storming of the US Capitol. "When ideas or fantasy are weaponized, there is a metamorphosis from harmless, bizarre theories to a dangerous bloom of tribalism and dehumanization of others," he wrote in the report. "This bloom expands digitally from person to person, absorbing and then converting a tribe that believes alternate realities based on a directed stream of algorithmically and group targeted data, ignorant analytic white papers, memes, ideas and coded language."

Since leaving Congress in January 2021, Riggleman has been working with experts and academics at the Network Contagion Research Institute to study disinformation and how to combat it.

==== 2020 ====
The Rappahannock County Republican Party criticized Riggleman after he officiated a same-sex wedding between two of his friends, and in September he was censured by party officials who claimed that he had "abandoned party principles" over fiscal and immigration policy.

On September 26, 2019, Campbell County Supervisor Bob Good—who also worked as an athletics official at Liberty University—announced his intention to challenge Riggleman in the 2020 Republican primary. In his announcement, Good accused Riggleman of "betraying" the trust of conservative voters in the 5th district along with casting votes that were not in his constituency's best interest. Riggleman secured key endorsements on the right, including from Liberty University President Jerry Falwell, Jr.

The local party leaders of the 5th Congressional District Republican Committee chose to determine the 2020 nominee for the fifth district by a convention instead of a primary election. On June 13, 2020, Good defeated Riggleman at the nominating convention with 58% of the vote to Riggleman's 42%.

=== Tenure ===
==== Committee assignments ====
- Committee on Financial Services
  - Subcommittee on National Security, International Development and Monetary Policy (Vice Ranking Member)
  - Subcommittee on Consumer Protection and Financial Institutions

==== Caucus memberships ====
- International Conservation Caucus
- House Manufacturing Caucus
- Congressional Candy Caucus
- Small Brewers Caucus
- Bourbon Caucus
- Republican Study Committee
- Congressional EMS Caucus
- Congressional Service Women and Women Veterans Caucus

=== Farewell address ===
On December 11, 2020, Riggleman gave a farewell address on the floor of the House. He said his experience as an Air Force intelligence officer taught him "... the invaluable lesson of considering the source" when examining disinformation. He stated that "a well-instructed" and knowledgeable people are the pillars of a functional republic, and that "Those pillars are now being assaulted by disinformation and outlandish theories surrounding this presidential election." Riggleman added "As we transition to a new administration I implore all to consider the sources of information you receive, to fact check diligently", he pleaded, asking his fellow Americans "to recognize that many bad actors who spread spurious and fantastical conspiracy theories under banners like QAnon, Kraken, 'Stop the Steal, 'Scamdemic' and many other emotive terms and coded language are not disseminating information rooted in knowledge but with questionable motives and greed. They are rooted in misunderstanding, or fraud or in some cases, ignorance." He told "all those on the end of the disinformation fire hose" that "unbiased, fact-based information sustains our republic," adding that "disinformation hinders our free exchange of ideas and creates super spreader digital viruses that create a fever of nonsense." He asked his audience to remember that "people are more important than party" and that "pandering is a political sickness."

== Post-Congressional career ==
=== January 6 Committee staffer ===
On August 6, 2021, Riggleman was appointed to serve as a senior staffer to the United States House Select Committee on the January 6 Attack on the U.S. Capitol. In April 2022, Riggleman sent the January 6 Committee chairman and vice chairwoman a letter informing them of his decision to leave his position in the coming weeks.

On the evening of Wednesday, June 1, 2022, Riggleman appeared on Anderson Cooper 360 (CNN). On Friday, June 3, 2022, Politico reported that January 6 Committee staff director, and former CIA Inspector General, David Buckley said in an email to staff the previous day: "I want you to know that I am deeply disappointed in [Riggleman's] decision to discuss the Select Committee’s work on television"..."in direct contravention to his employment agreement".

=== Other associations ===
In October 2022, Riggleman joined Issue One's Council for Responsible Social Media project, which states its mission is to address the mental, civic, and public health impacts of social media in the United States. The council is co-chaired by former House Democratic Caucus Leader Dick Gephardt and former Massachusetts Lieutenant Governor Kerry Healey.

In 2023, Riggleman joined the legal team for Hunter Biden, performing data analysis and other services in support of Biden's legal defense. Riggleman has been described as a member of Hunter Biden's "inner circle."

On August 4, 2024, Riggleman endorsed Kamala Harris for President, while criticizing Donald Trump’s role in the January 6 protest and his pursuit of "power, revenge, and retribution". Riggleman announced his support for Harris as part of her "Republicans for Harris" initiative, even though Riggleman hadn't been a Republican for over two years. On October 16, 2024, he endorsed Democratic Virginia Senator Tim Kaine for reelection, citing concerns over the Republican Party's embrace of misinformation; Kaine was facing retired U.S. Navy Captain Hung Cao.

In January 2025, Riggleman announced he was creating an exploratory committee to consider possible independent runs for either Governor or Lieutenant Governor of Virginia. However, he ultimately declined to file a candidacy. Instead, he announced his endorsement of Democratic nominee Abigail Spanberger in September 2025. Concurrently, he backed incumbent Republican Attorney General Jason Miyares for reelection.

Riggleman expressed support of Ukraine following the 2022 Russian invasion, the effects of which he stated also permeated American politics such as Russia's cyberwarfare and disinformation operations. He departed the January 6 Committee in part to "help the people of Ukraine in their war against Russia", and has visited the country to assist in humanitarian efforts. While in Kyiv in 2025, Riggleman partnered with Ken Casey of the Dropkick Murphys and Ukrainian band O'Hamsters to record a Ukrainian version of the former's song "Who'll Stand With Us?".

== Electoral history ==
Virginia's 5th congressional district, 2018
Party	Candidate	Votes	%
Republican	Denver Riggleman	165,339	53.18
Democratic	Leslie Cockburn	145,040	46.65
n/a	Write-ins	547	0.18
Total votes		310,926	100.0
Republican hold			

== Personal life ==
Riggleman has been married to Christine Blair Riggleman since 1989. They reside in Nellysford and have three daughters. In July 2019, Riggleman was the officiant at a same-sex marriage for two of his friends who had previously been campaign volunteers.

U.S. House of Representatives
Preceded by Tom Garrett	Member of the U.S. House of Representatives from Virginia's 5th congressional district 2019–2021	Succeeded by Bob Good
U.S. order of precedence (ceremonial)
Preceded by Scott Taylor as Former U.S. Representative	Order of precedence of the United States as Former U.S. Representative	Succeeded by Bruce Caputo as Former U.S. Representative
