= Hunter Walker =

American reporter

Personal details
- Born: 10 September 1984 (age 42) Brooklyn, New York, U.S.
- Website: Hunter Walker at Twitter

Hunter Walker (born September 10, 1984) is an investigative reporter and author from Brooklyn, New York City.

== Career ==
Walker has written for a variety of magazines and websites including Rolling Stone, The New Yorker, New York Magazine, Vanity Fair, The Atlantic, the Village Voice, National Geographic, Columbia Journalism Review, and Gawker.com.

Walker is co-author with Luppe B. Luppen of The Truce: Progressives, Centrists, and the Future of the Democratic Party.

Walker spent five years at Yahoo! News where he was a White House Correspondent during the entirety of the Trump administration. He has worked for several other news organizations as a reporter and editor covering politics including the New York Observer, Business Insider, and Talking Points Memo.

During 2021 and 2022, Walker authored a Substack newsletter that was focused on the January 6 United States Capitol attack. His coverage of the attack, which included live broadcasts from the scene at the U.S. Capitol and a series of articles for Rolling Stone has been widely cited and was among the first reporting detailing planning efforts and communications between Mark Meadows, the Trump family, members of Congress, and activists involved in attempts to overturn the 2020 U.S. presidential election. In 2022, he co-authored a book with former Congressman Denver Riggleman titled The Breach. The book details Riggleman's work on the United States House Select Committee on the January 6 Attack.

Before covering politics, Walker worked in Hollywood where he was employed by The Daily and helped launch its gossip section with former Page Six editor Richard Johnson. Walker also covered the television industry for the TheWrap.com.

Walker has conducted exclusive interviews with several major political figures including Donald Trump, Bernie Sanders, Alexandria Ocasio-Cortez, and Cory Booker. He is a 2010 graduate of the Columbia School of Journalism.
