= Cynthia Dunbar =

American politician

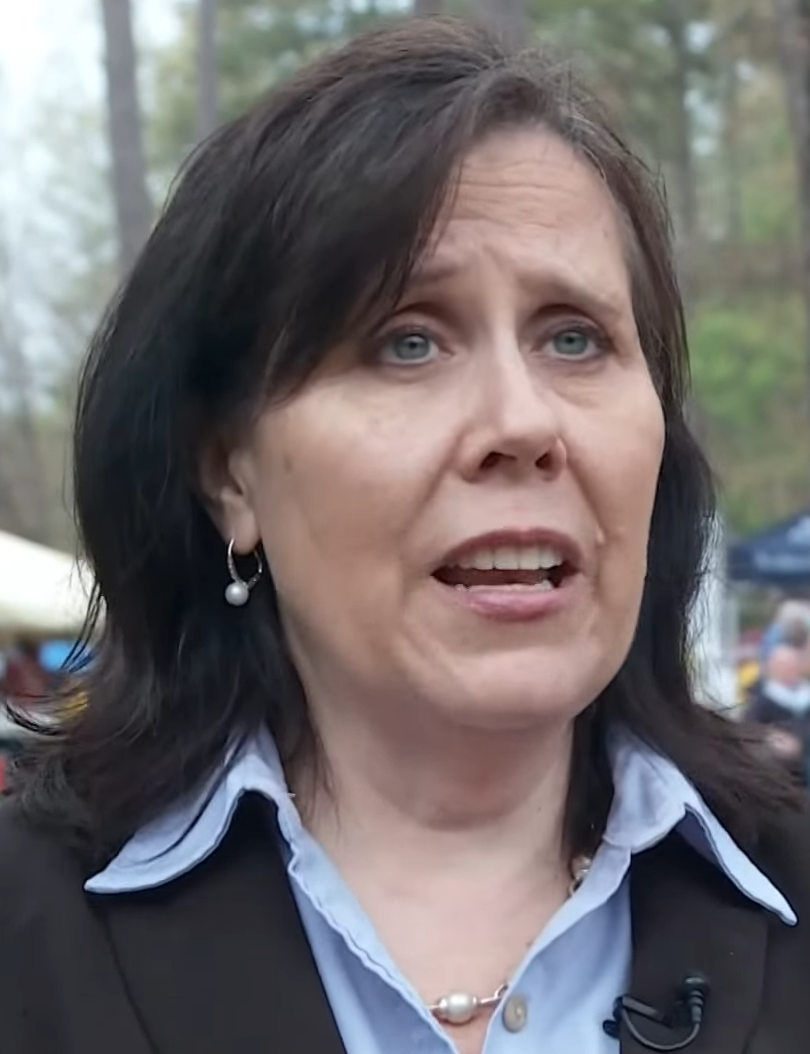
- Dunbar in 2016

Republican National Committeewoman from Virginia
- In office May 2016 – May 2020
- Preceded by: Kathy Hayden
- Succeeded by: Patti Lyman

Member of the Texas Board of Education from the 10th district
- In office January 2007 – January 2011
- Preceded by: Cynthia A. Thornton
- Succeeded by: Marsha Farney

Personal details
- Born: June 27, 1964 (age 62) Osage Beach, Missouri, U.S.
- Party: Republican
- Education: University of Missouri (BS); Regent University (JD)
- Occupation: Attorney, author

Cynthia Noland Dunbar (born June 27, 1964) is a Republican National Committee member for the U.S. Commonwealth of Virginia who entered the 2018 race as a congressional candidate for the 6th Congressional District of Virginia. She was the state-co-chair for Ted Cruz in the 2016 presidential primary race and a Texas Board of Education member.

== Life ==
Dunbar studied at the University of Missouri in Columbia, Missouri. In 1990, Dunbar graduated from Pat Robertson's Regent University School of Law. During the 2009–2010 academic year, she commuted from her home in Texas to teach at the Liberty University School of Law, established by the late Jerry Falwell.

Dunbar was divorced from attorney spouse, Glen Dunbar, in February 2008, and, in 2014, she married again. She is a former assistant professor of law and advisor to the provost of Liberty University.

=== Political career ===
While residing in Richmond and Sugar Land, in Fort Bend County—suburbs of Houston, Texas— Dunbar, a Republican, lawyer and author, served on the 15-member elected Texas State Board of Education. In 2006, Dunbar won the Republican nomination for the Texas State Board of Education for District 10. She polled 32,589 votes (64.3 percent) to intra-party rival Tony Dale's 18,114 (35.7 percent). Dunbar claimed that voters responded to her call for teaching intelligent design in science classes, rather than only the theory of evolution. In the general election that year, she defeated Libertarian Martin Thomen, a clerk, with 225,839 votes (70.38%) to 95,034 votes (29.62%). She did not run for reelection in 2010 and her term hence ran from 2007 to January 2011.

In early 2008, Dunbar ran for the Republican nomination for the United States House of Representatives to represent Texas's 22nd congressional district, the district formerly held by Tom DeLay. She eventually withdrew and endorsed Shelley Sekula-Gibbs, who briefly held the seat, now represented by Pete Olson.

Dunbar was publicly criticized in 2008 for a column she wrote for Christian Worldview Network, in which she claimed that then Democratic presidential candidate Barack Obama was plotting with terrorists to attack the U.S. within his first 6 months in office.

In November 2017, Dunbar announced she would run for Congress in Virginia's 6th congressional district in 2018 for the seat being vacated by the retiring incumbent Bob Goodlatte. She was endorsed by Congressman Ron Paul. Ultimately she lost the 2018 GOP primary election to state delegate Ben Cline.

== Works ==
- One Nation Under God: How the Left Is Trying to Erase What Made Us Great (HigherLife Development Services, 2008) ISBN 0-9793227-2-3
