= 2018 Virginia elections =

- November 6, 2018

During the 2018 election year in Virginia several local, state, and federal elections were held. On May 1, several of Virginia's cities and towns held mayoral, city council, and school board elections. Primary elections for Congress were held on June 12.

The general election was on November 6, 2018, for all 11 of Virginia's House of Representatives seats, as well as the Class 1 Senate seat. 2018 Virginia's 8th House of Delegates district special election was also held that day. The seat, being vacated by Greg Habeeb, was sought by Republican Roanoke County Supervisor Joe McNamara and Radford University associate director Democrat Carter Turner.

Special elections were held on January 16 for Chilhowie town council, on February 6 for Leesburg town council, and on July 24 for Isle of Wight County sheriff.

== Federal elections ==
=== United States Senate ===
On November 6, Virginians re-elected their Class 1 senator Tim Kaine, to serve from 2019 until 2025. He was challenged by Republican Corey Stewart and Libertarian Matt Waters. The Commonwealth's Green and Constitution parties did not run candidates.

2018 United States Senate election in Virginia
Party	Candidate	Votes	Percentage
Democratic	Tim Kaine (incumbent)	1,910,370	57.0%
Republican	Corey Stewart	1,374,313	41.0%
Libertarian	Matt Waters	61,565	1.84%
Independent (Write-in)	-	5,125	0.15%
Totals			3,351,373
Voter turnout (voting age population)			

=== House of Representatives ===
Virginians elected their representatives who served from 2019 until 2021. Nine of the 11 incumbent Representatives ran for re-election. The Republican Party were defending seven seats, five of which were incumbents, and the Democratic Party were defending four seats, all of whom were incumbents. Ten of the 11 districts featured at least two candidates running, while three districts had third party candidates running.

United States House of Representatives elections in Virginia, 2018
Party	Votes	Percentage	Seats before	Seats after	+/–
Democratic	1,867,061	56.36%	4	7	+3
Republican	1,408,701	42.52%	7	4	-3
Libertarian	13,995	0.42%	0	0	-
Independents/Write-In	23,157	0.70%	0	0	-
Totals	3,312,914	100.00%	11	11	—

=== By district ===
Results of the 2018 United States House of Representatives elections in Virginia by district:

District	Democratic		Republican		Others		Total		Result
District	Votes	%	Votes	%	Votes	%	Votes	%	Result
District 1	148,464	44.70%	183,250	55.18%	387	0.12%	332,101	100.0%	Republican hold
District 2	139,571	51.05%	133,458	48.81%	371	0.14%	273,400	100.0%	Democratic gain
District 3	198,615	91.22%	0	0.00%	19,107	8.78%	217,722	100.0%	Democratic hold
District 4	187,642	62.58%	107,706	35.92%	4,506	1.50%	299,854	100.0%	Democratic hold
District 5	145,040	46.65%	165,339	53.18%	547	0.18%	310,926	100.0%	Republican hold
District 6	113,133	40.21%	167,957	59.69%	287	0.10%	281,377	100.0%	Republican hold
District 7	176,079	50.34%	169,295	48.40%	4,429	1.27%	349,803	100.0%	Democratic gain
District 8	247,137	76.10%	76,899	23.68%	712	0.22%	324,748	100.0%	Democratic hold
District 9	85,833	34.75%	160,933	65.16%	214	0.09%	246,980	100.0%	Republican hold
District 10	206,356	56.11%	160,841	43.73%	598	0.16%	367,795	100.0%	Democratic gain
District 11	219,191	71.11%	83,023	26.93%	6,036	1.96%	308,250	100.0%	Democratic hold
Total	1,867,061	56.36%	1,408,701	42.52%	37,194	1.12%	3,312,956	100.0%	

== Ballot measures ==
There were two state constitutional amendments on the ballot. Both proposed ballot amendments received nearly universal, bipartisan support in the Virginia House of Delegates and Senate.

Amendment 1 reads: "Should a county, city, or town be authorized to provide a partial tax exemption for real property that is subject to recurrent flooding, if flooding resiliency improvements have been made on the property?"

Question 1
Choice	Votes	%
For	2,305,867	70.73
Against	954,252	29.27
Total	3,260,119	100.00

Amendment 2 reads: "Shall the real property tax exemption for a primary residence that is currently provided to the surviving spouses of veterans who had a one hundred percent service-connected, permanent, and total disability be amended to allow the surviving spouse to move to a different primary residence and still claim the exemption?"

Question 1
Choice	Votes	%
For	2,755,941	84.37
Against	510,399	15.63
Total	3,266,340	100.00

== Municipal elections ==
=== City mayoral elections ===
The following towns in Virginia held mayoral elections. Most mayoral elections were held on May 1, 2018. City elections in Virginia are officially nonpartisan; parties are only shown if their affiliated party is known.

Town	Party	Incumbent	Status	Party	Candidate	Votes	%
Fairfax	Independent	David L. Meyer	Won	Independent	David L. Meyer	2,167	94.48%
Fairfax	Independent	David L. Meyer	Won	Write-in	Write-in	153	5.52%
Franklin	Nonpartisan	Frank Rabil	Won	Nonpartisan	Frank Rabil	821	76.59%
Franklin	Nonpartisan	Frank Rabil	Won	Write-in	Write-in	251	23.41%
Newport News	Democratic	McKinley L. Price	Won	Democratic	McKinley L. Price	9,399	55.61%
Newport News	Democratic	McKinley L. Price	Won	Democratic	Santiel Creekmore	921	5.45%
Newport News	Democratic	McKinley L. Price	Won	Green	Dominique Green	2,017	11.93%
Newport News	Democratic	McKinley L. Price	Won	Democratic	Marcellus Harris III	4,501	26.63%
Newport News	Democratic	McKinley L. Price	Won	Write-in	Write-in	63	0.38%
Radford	Republican	Bruce Brown	Retiring	Democratic	David Horton	1,402	53.82%
Radford	Republican	Bruce Brown	Retiring	Republican	Keith Marshall	1,198	45.99%
Radford	Republican	Bruce Brown	Retiring	Write-in	Write-in	5	0.19%

=== Town mayoral elections ===
The following towns in Virginia held mayoral elections. Most mayoral elections were held on May 1, 2018. Town elections in Virginia are officially nonpartisan; parties are only shown if their affiliated party is known.

Town	Party	Incumbent	Status	Party	Candidate	Votes	%
Accomac	Nonpartisan	Richard Wallace	Won	Nonpartisan	Richard Wallace	21	84.00%
Accomac	Nonpartisan	Richard Wallace	Won	Write-in	Write-in	4	16.00%
Appomattox	Nonpartisan	Paul D. Harvey	Won	Nonpartisan	Paul D. Harvey	65	100%
Appomattox	Nonpartisan	Paul D. Harvey	Won	Write-in	Write-in	0	0%
Belle Haven	Nonpartisan	Marion F. Long	Retiring	Nonpartisan	George H. Ludlow Jr.	36	94.74%
Belle Haven	Nonpartisan	Marion F. Long	Retiring	Write-in	Write-in	2	5.26%
Blackstone	Nonpartisan	Billy Coleburn	Won	Nonpartisan	Billy Coleburn	458	71.90%
Blackstone	Nonpartisan	Billy Coleburn	Won	Nonpartisan	Carolyn Davis	179	28.10%
Boydton	Nonpartisan	Tommy Coleman	Won	Nonpartisan	Johnny Kirkland	62	96.88%
Boydton	Nonpartisan	Tommy Coleman	Won	Write-in	Write-in	2	3.13%
Boykins	Nonpartisan	R. Spier Edwards Jr.	Lost	Nonpartisan	Danny Ray Bolton	57	39.31%
Boykins	Nonpartisan	R. Spier Edwards Jr.	Lost	Nonpartisan	R. Spier Edwards Jr.	47	32.41%
Boykins	Nonpartisan	R. Spier Edwards Jr.	Lost	Nonpartisan	Jerry Rice	41	28.28%
Cape Charles	Nonpartisan	George Proto	Retired	Nonpartisan	Smitty Dize Jr.	269	67.59%
Cape Charles	Nonpartisan	George Proto	Retired	Nonpartisan	Terry G. Carney	128	32.16%
Cape Charles	Nonpartisan	George Proto	Retired	Write-in	Write-in	1	0.25%
