= 1842 Virginia gubernatorial election =

- February 11–12, 1842 (first attempt); December 15, 1842 (second attempt)
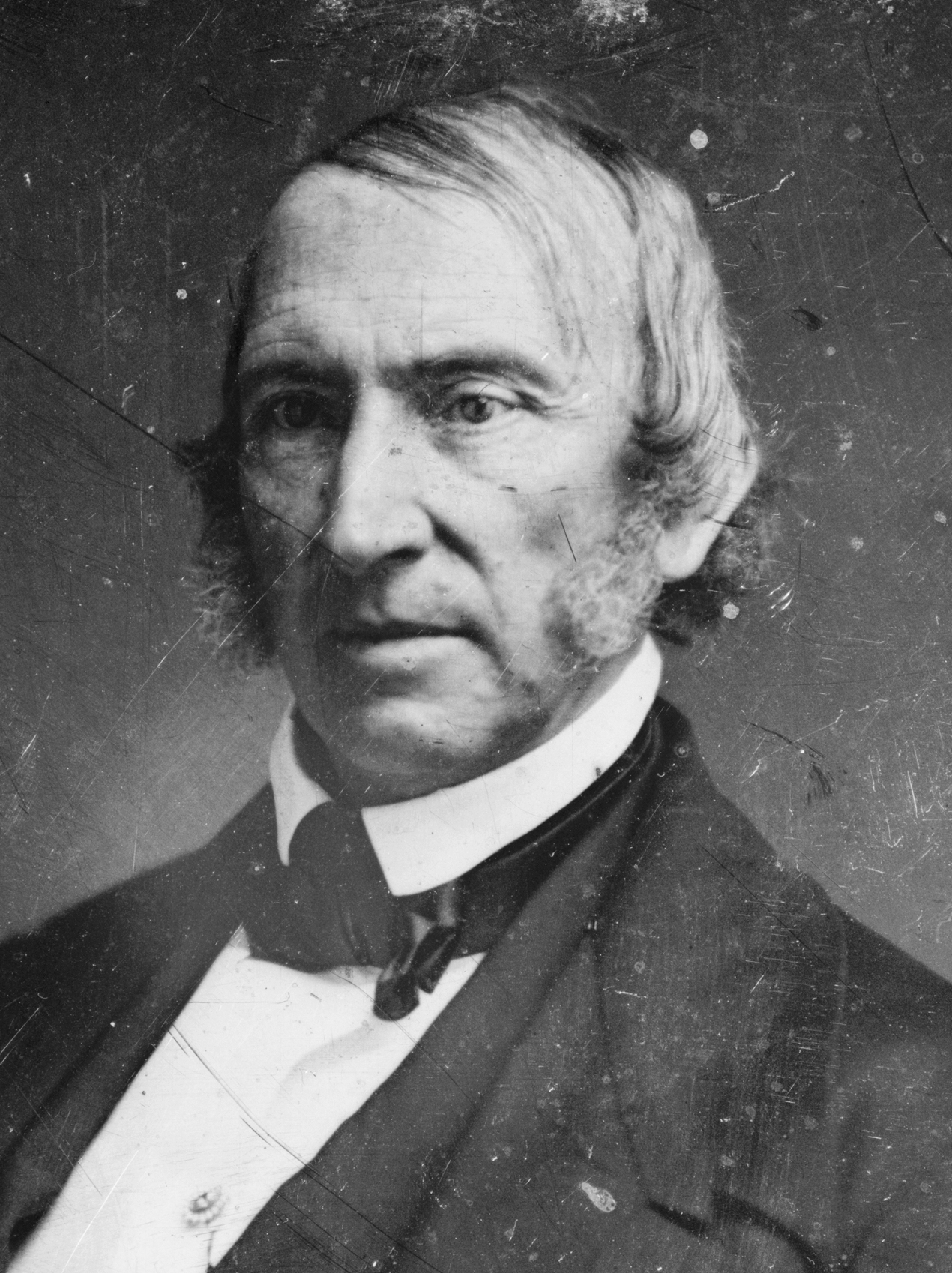

Nominee	James McDowell	William P. Taylor	Edward Watts
Party	Democratic	Democratic	Whig
1st ballot	1	79	80
9th ballot	110	9	8
Governor before election
John Munford Gregory (acting)
Whig
Elected Governor
James McDowell
Democratic

Gubernatorial elections were held in Virginia on February 11–12 and December 15, 1842. The Democratic former member of the Virginia House of Delegates from Rockbridge County James McDowell defeated the Democratic former U.S. representative from Virginia's 9th congressional district William P. Taylor and the Whig commonwealth attorney for Roanoke County Edward Watts.

The previous governor of Virginia Thomas Walker Gilmer resigned on March 20, 1841. John M. Patton, John Rutherfoord, and John Munford Gregory succeeded to office in turn in their capacities as the senior member of the Executive Council and acted as governor until the election of a successor.

The 1841 state elections resulted in split control of the legislature, with a Whig majority in the House of Delegates and a Democratic majority in the Virginia Senate. The powerful Richmond Junto was believed to favor the former speaker of the United States House of Representatives Andrew Stevenson as Gilmer's successor. Allies of the U.S. senator from South Carolina John C. Calhoun suspected Stevenson of using the governorship as a stepping stone to secure the Democratic vice presidential nomination in 1844 and determined to oppose his election. McDowell had the most support of the potential Democratic candidates, having narrowly lost the 1840 Virginia gubernatorial election to Gilmer after eight consecutive ballots.

The election was conducted by the Virginia General Assembly in joint session. During the voting on February 11–12, the Democratic Senate majority repeatedly prevented the election of a governor. After eight consecutive ballots, the Senate adjourned, and the election was postponed indefinitely.

Democrats controlled both chambers of the legislature following the 1842 state elections, which resulted in a landslide defeat for the Whigs. The elections did nothing to increase the influence of the Richmond Junto, which had steadily declined since 1837. Unable to prevent McDowell's nomination by the Democratic legislative caucus, Thomas Ritchie, the leader of the Junto and editor of the Richmond Enquirer, endorsed McDowell in hopes of averting an intra-party split. McDowell easily prevailed in the caucus, an outcome that represented the end of the Junto's leadership of the Virginia Democratic Party.

The newly-elected General Assembly met in joint session on December 15, 1842. McDowell was elected with a majority on the first ballot.

== General election ==
=== February 11 ===
1842 Virginia gubernatorial election
Party	Candidate	Ballot	
Party	Candidate	1st	2nd
Whig	Edward Watts	80	81
Democratic	William P. Taylor	79	81
Democratic	Henley Chapman	2	—N/a
Democratic	James McDowell	1	1
Whig	John Howe Peyton	1	—N/a
Democratic	Andrew Stevenson	1	1
Total		164	164

=== February 12 ===
1842 Virginia gubernatorial election
Party	Candidate	Ballot					
Party	Candidate	1st	2nd	3rd	4th	5th	6th
Democratic	William P. Taylor	78	—N/a				
Whig	Edward Watts	56	4	3	1	—N/a	1
Whig	Lewis Summers	26	68	71	68	—N/a	
Whig	William B. Preston	4	3	6	41	41	66
Democratic	James McDowell	2	2	1	—N/a		55
Democratic	Andrew Stevenson	2	78	79	82	80	22
Whig	Robert Eden Scott	—N/a	2	—N/a			1
Whig	John F. May	—N/a	2	1	—N/a		
Whig	James M. Garnett	—N/a	2	2	3	1	1
Democratic	Isaac S. Pennybacker	—N/a	1	—N/a			
Whig	Robert W. Carter	—N/a		1	—N/a		
Whig	John M. Patton	—N/a		1	1	—N/a	
Whig	John Howe Peyton	—N/a		1	—N/a		4
Democratic	Richard H. Baptist	—N/a		1	—N/a		
Whig	Oscar M. Crutchfield	—N/a			1	—N/a	
Whig	Vincent Witcher	—N/a				39	5
Whig	David McComas	—N/a				1	—N/a
Democratic	George W. Munford	—N/a				1	1
Democratic	William F. Gordon	—N/a				1	—N/a
Whig	William M. McCarty	—N/a					1
Whig	Robert M. T. Hunter	—N/a					1
Total		164	162	164	164	163	159

==== House of Delegates: 7th ballot ====
The House of Delegates proceeded to a seventh ballot immediately after the sixth, with the following result. The Senate, however, adjourned rather than continue voting, and the election was postponed indefinitely.

1842 Virginia gubernatorial election: House of Delegates
Party	Candidate	Seventh ballot	
Party	Candidate	Count	Percent
Democratic	James McDowell	55	44.72
Whig	William B. Preston	53	43.09
Democratic	John Winston Jones	3	2.44
Democratic	Andrew Stevenson	3	2.44
Whig	John Howe Peyton	2	1.63
Whig	Robert Eden Scott	2	1.63
Whig	Charles P. Dorman	1	0.81
Whig	William Kinney	1	0.81
Democratic	Thomas Ritchie	1	0.81
Democratic	Littleton Waller Tazewell	1	0.81
Whig	Vincent Witcher	1	0.81
Total		123	100.00

=== December 15 ===
1842 Virginia gubernatorial election
Party	Candidate	First ballot	
Party	Candidate	Count	Percent
Democratic	James McDowell	110	68.75
Democratic	William P. Taylor	9	5.62
Whig	Edward Watts	8	5.00
Democratic	John Winston Jones	4	2.50
Whig	Benjamin Watkins Leigh	4	2.50
Whig	Robert Eden Scott	4	2.50
Democratic	Andrew Stevenson	4	2.50
—N/a	William Garnett	3	1.88
Whig	William M. Peyton	3	1.88
—N/a	Samuel C. Anderson	2	1.25
Democratic	John Y. Mason	2	1.25
—N/a	James W. Pegram	2	1.25
Whig	Oscar M. Crutchfield	1	0.62
Whig	James Lyons	1	0.62
Whig	William B. Preston	1	0.62
Whig	Samuel Watts	1	0.62
Whig	Vincent Witcher	1	0.62
Total		160	100.00

== Bibliography ==
- Bodie, Charles A. (2023). James McDowell of Virginia: The Perils of an Antebellum Southern Reformer. Lanham, MD: Lexington Books. p. 133.
- Dent, Lynwood Miller (1974). The Virginia Democratic Party, 1824-1847. (Volumes I and II) (PhD thesis). [Baton Rouge]: Louisiana State University.
- Prillaman, Hellen R. (2007). A Place Apart: A Brief History of the Early Williamson Road and North Roanoke Valley Residents and Places. Baltimore: Clearfield.
- Sobel, Robert; Raimo, John (1978). Biographical Directory of the Governors of the United States 1789–1978. Vol. 4. Westport, CT: Meckler Books.
- Virginia (1841a). Journal of the House of Delegates [...]. Richmond.
- Virginia (1842a). Journal of the House of Delegates [...]. Richmond.
- Virginia (1841b). Journal of the Senate [...]. Richmond.
- Virginia (1842b). Journal of the Senate [...]. Richmond.
