= Hugh White Sheffey =

American politician

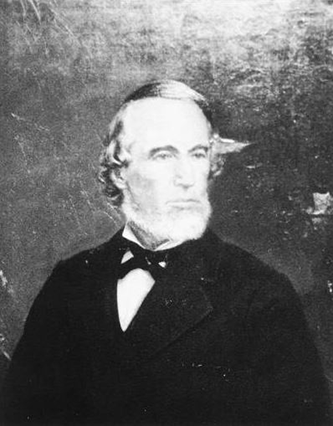
- Sheffey (c. 1863–1865)

28th Speaker of the Virginia House of Delegates
- In office 1863 – December 3, 1865
- Preceded by: James L. Kemper
- Succeeded by: John Brown Baldwin

Member of the Virginia House of Delegates from Augusta County, Virginia
- In office December 7, 1846 – December 1, 1850 Serving with Chapman Johnson, John M. McCue,
- Preceded by: John Brown Baldwin
- Succeeded by: John D. Imboden

Member of the Virginia Constitutional Convention from Augusta County, Virginia
- In office October 14, 1850 – August 1, 1851

Member of the Virginia Senate from Augusta County, Virginia
- In office January 12, 1852 – December 4, 1853
- Preceded by: William Kinney
- Succeeded by: Clement R. Harris

Member of the Virginia House of Delegates from Augusta County, Virginia
- In office December 2, 1861 – March 15, 1865 Serving with William M. Tate, James Walker, J. Marshall McCue
- Preceded by: Bolivar Christian

Judge of the Virginia Circuit Court in Augusta County, Virginia
- In office 1865–1869

Personal details
- Born: April 12, 1815 Wythe County, Virginia, US
- Died: April 8, 1889 (aged 73) Staunton, Virginia, US
- Resting place: Thornrose Cemetery, Staunton, Virginia
- Party: Whig
- Spouse: Louisa Cole
- Education: Yale University
- Occupation: Lawyer, politician, judge

Hugh W. Sheffey (April 12, 1815 – April 8, 1889) was a Virginia politician, lawyer and judge. He represented Augusta County in both houses of the Virginia General Assembly before and during the American Civil War, and served as the Speaker of the Virginia House of Delegates from 1863 until 1865, when he was elected a judge. Removed from office during Congressional Reconstruction because he could not sign a required loyalty oath, Sheffey returned to his legal practice and became an adjunct professor at Washington & Lee University School of Law from 1875 to 1885.

== Early life, education and family life ==
Son of Henry L. and Margaret Sheffey, Hugh Sheffey was born in Wythe County, Virginia, on April 12, 1815, and named for his mother's brother. His father died when he was 8 or 9 years old, and since his mother had already died, he was adopted by his paternal uncle, U.S. Congressman Daniel Sheffey, a Federalist and lawyer who had moved to Staunton. Hugh Sheffey entered Yale College at the end of the freshman year, after his uncle's death. Graduating in 1835, Hugh Sheffey taught for a few years in Southside Virginia, as well as read law with the Hon. Thomas S. Gholson in Brunswick. Hugh was the middle of five brothers. His eldest brother Daniel Henry Sheffey was blind and traveled extensively with a black companion; his next eldest brother Dr. James White Sheffey Sr. remained in southwest Virginia, became a delegate to the Virginia Secession Convention of 1861 and later the Virginia House of Delegates; his younger brother Dr. Lawrence Brengeler Sheffey Sr. practiced in Huntsville, Alabama; his youngest brother Robert Sayers Sheffey became a prominent and idiosyncratic circuit-riding Methodist evangelist in Appalachia.

On December 23, 1847, Hugh Sheffey married Louisa Cole of Baltimore, Maryland. Their marriage lasted more than four decades and they had at least two daughters: Sara Louisa Sheffey (b. 1850): and Margaret (Maggie) Sheffey (b. 1851). Widowed, Louisa Sheffey survived her husband by less than a month. In 1877 Washington and Lee University awarded Hugh Sheffey an honorary degree of Doctor of Laws; his alma mater did likewise in 1880.

== Career ==
In 1840 Sheffey began practicing law in Staunton. In 1846 Augusta county voters elected him to the Virginia General Assembly as one of their two delegates. During the next decades he remained in public life (part-time). He was repeatedly re-elected as delegate until 1850, when he became one of the five members of the Virginia Constitutional Convention of 1850 jointly representing Augusta, Rockbridge and Highland Counties (alongside future governor John Letcher, David E. Moore, Adam Stephenson Jr. and David Fultz. In 1851, Sheffey successfully ran for the Virginia Senate, but was not re-elected in 1853, losing to Clement R. Harris. In 1860, Sheffey owned eight enslaved persons: 3 men, 3 women, a three-year-old boy and a two-year-old girl.

In 1861 Augusta County voters again elected Sheffey to the House of Delegates, where he served alongside William M. Tate and James Walker. Re-elected two years later fellow delegates elected him their Speaker during Virginia's secession. Sheffey was originally a Union man, and unlike his elder brother Dr. James W. Sheffey, Hugh Sheffey had declined to stand for election to the convention which had passed the ordinance of secession. However, when Virginia's voters approved secession, Sheffey stood by his state.

After Virginia conceded defeat, fellow legislators elected Sheffey a judge of the local Circuit Court, and he continued on the bench until the winter of 1869, when he was removed during Congressional Reconstruction because he could not take the "iron-clad" oath required by the federal government. Sheffey then resumed his legal practice and remained in Staunton until his death.

He was very active in Trinity Episcopal Church. Beginning in 1868, Sheffey served as one of Virginia's delegates to the General Convention and was prominent in the councils of the Protestant Episcopal Church in the Diocese of Virginia,

== Death ==
Hugh White Sheffey died in Augusta County on April 8, 1889, at the age of 74.
