= John Clopton (disambiguation) =

John Clopton was an American politician.

John Clopton may also refer to:

- John B. Clopton (1789–1860), American politician and jurist from Virginia
- John Clopton (died 1424), MP for Gloucester
- John Clopton (died 1497), sheriff of Suffolk and Norfolk
- John Clopton (died 1719), MP for Warwick
