= Senator Harrison =

Senator Harrison may refer to:

== Members of the United States Senate ==
- Benjamin Harrison (1833–1901), U.S. Senator from Indiana from 1881 to 1887
- Pat Harrison (1881–1941), U.S. Senator from Mississippi 1919 to 1941
- William Henry Harrison (1773–1841), U.S. Senator from Ohio from 1825 to 1828

== United States state senate members ==
- Albertis Harrison (1907–1995), Virginia State Senate
- Burr Harrison (1904–1973), Virginia State Senate
- George Paul Harrison Jr. (1841–1922), Alabama State Senate
- Henry Baldwin Harrison (1821–1901), Connecticut State Senate
- Peachy Harrison (1777–1848), Virginia State Senate
- Richard A. Harrison (1824–1904), Ohio State Senate
- Russell Benjamin Harrison (1854–1936), Indiana
- Steve Harrison (politician) (born 1966), West Virginia State Senate
- Thomas W. Harrison (1856–1935), Virginia State Senate
