= John William Green =

John William Green may refer to:

- John Green (botanist) (born 1930), Australian botanist
- John W. Green (Virginia politician) (1781–1834), American lawyer and judge
