= 1840 Virginia gubernatorial election =

- February 11, 1840
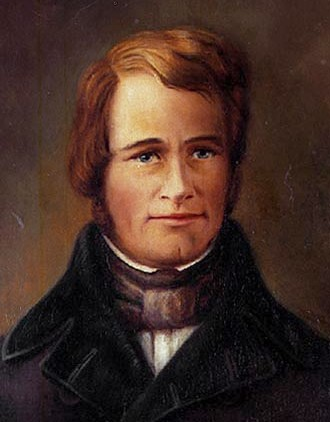

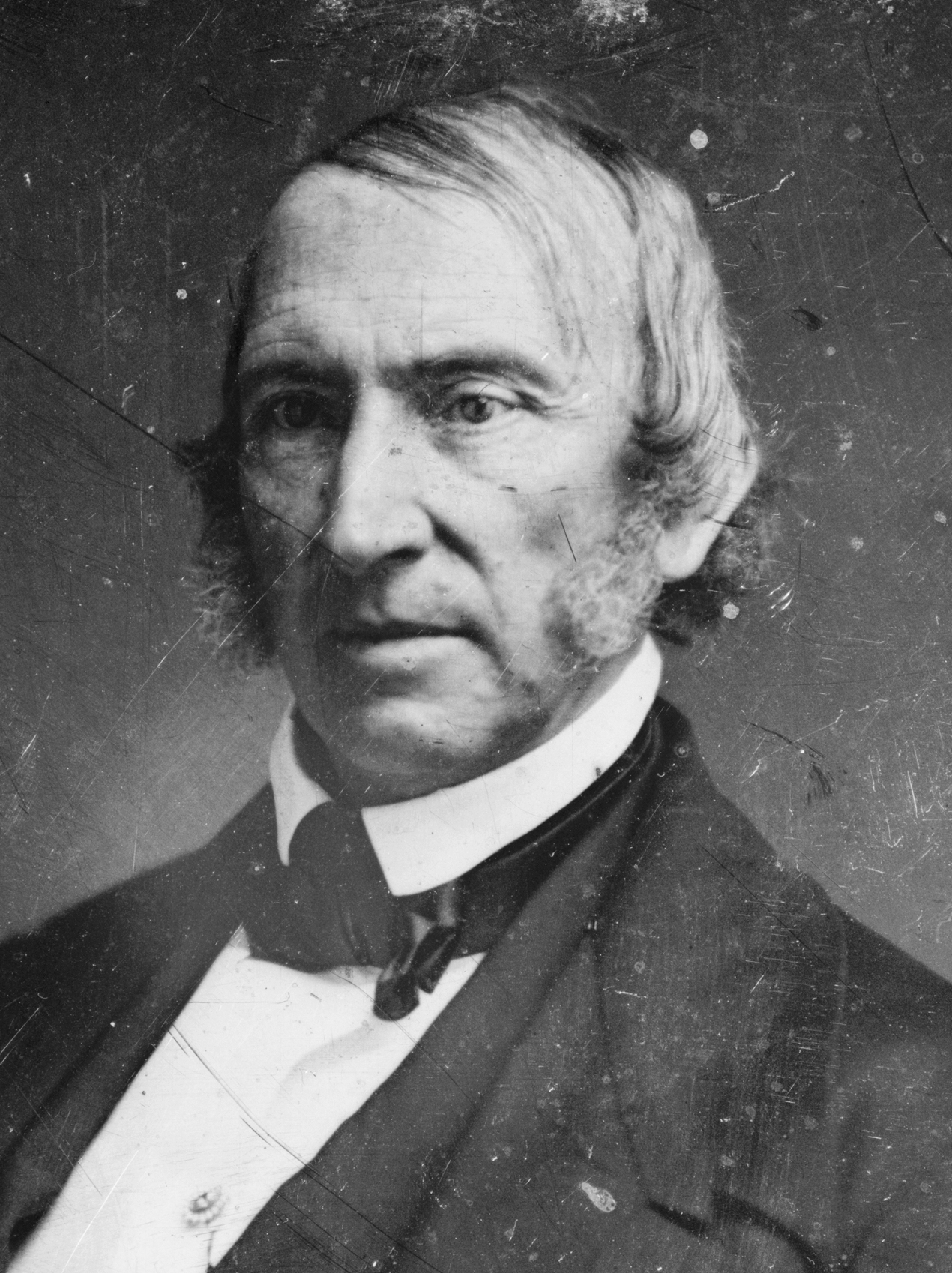

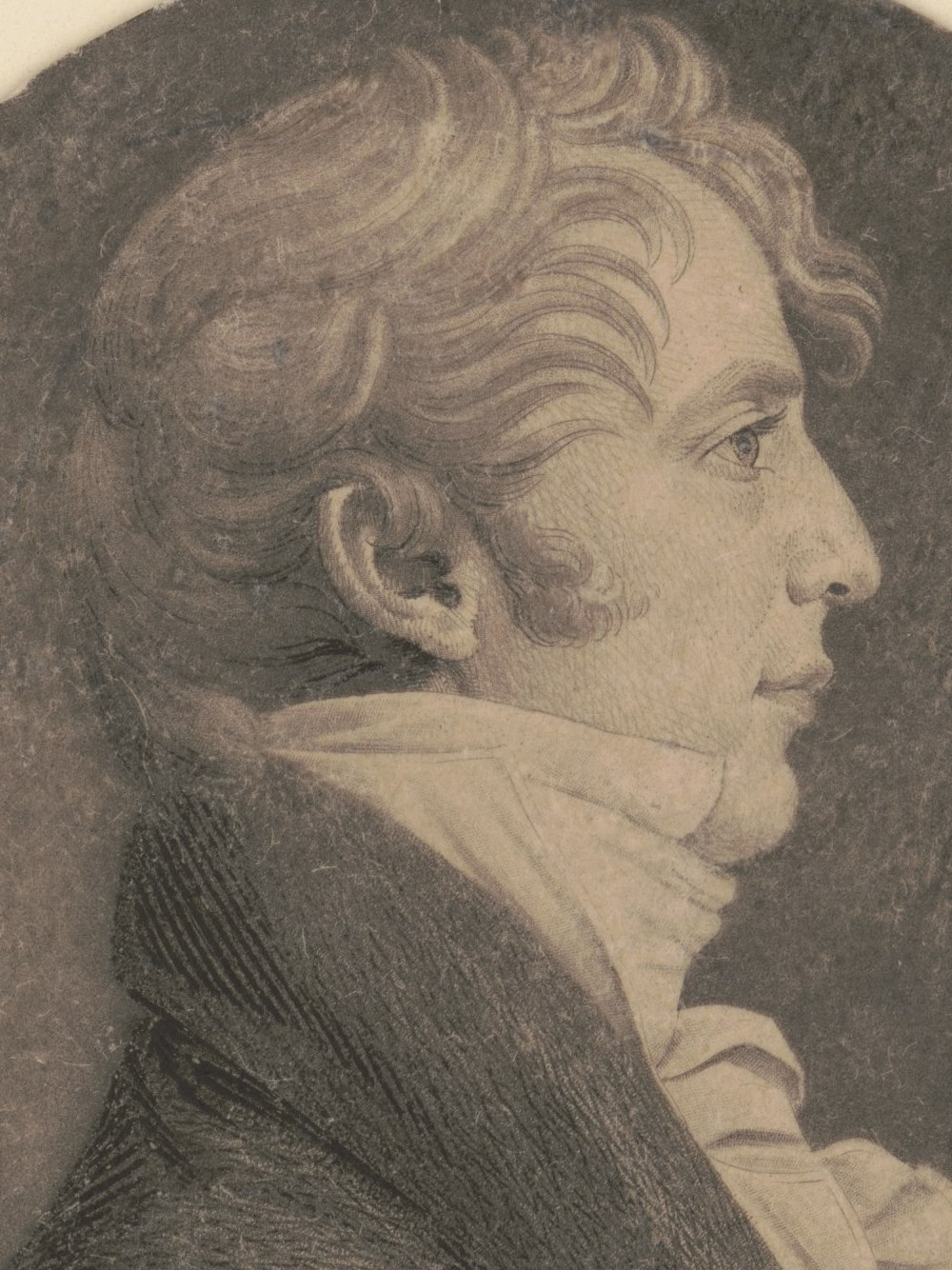

Nominee	Thomas Walker Gilmer	James McDowell
Party	Whig	Democratic
1st ballot	77	66
8th ballot	83	50
Nominee	Philip N. Nicholas	Joseph S. Watkins
Party	Democratic	Democratic
1st ballot	—	18
8th ballot	11	—
Governor before election
David Campbell
Democratic
Elected Governor
Thomas Walker Gilmer
Whig

A gubernatorial election was held in Virginia on February 11, 1840. The Whig speaker of the Virginia House of Delegates Thomas Walker Gilmer defeated the Democratic former member of the Virginia House of Delegates from Rockbridge County James McDowell.

The Whigs were the largest party in the legislature following the 1839 state elections, while the Conservatives held the balance of power despite losing 11 seats. Both parties determined to cooperate in the gubernatorial election in order to defeat the Democratic candidate. A caucus of the Democratic members of the legislature met prior to the election and nominated McDonnell, who was popular with voters in Western Virginia. McConnell had previously sought to succeed William Cabell Rives in the United States Senate, but lost his bid for the Democratic nomination due to his past support for the abolition of slavery.

The election was conducted by the Virginia General Assembly in joint session. No candidate had a majority on the first ballot, requiring eight consecutive rounds of voting. Gilmer was elected with a majority on the eighth ballot.

== General election ==
1840 Virginia gubernatorial election
Party	Candidate	Ballot							
Party	Candidate	1st	2nd	3rd	4th	5th	6th	7th	8th
Whig	Thomas Walker Gilmer	77	79	79	80	82	82	82	83
Democratic	James McDowell	66	76	80	80	80	52	40	50
Democratic	Joseph S. Watkins	18	7	1	—N/a		11	—N/a	
Conservative	William M. Peyton	1	1	1	1	—N/a			
Democratic	John Rutherfoord	1	—N/a						
Democratic	Andrew Beirne	—N/a		1	—N/a				
Democratic	Joseph H. Samuels	—N/a		1	—N/a				
Whig	Lewis Summers	—N/a		1	—N/a				
—N/a	Edwin S. Duncan	—N/a			1	—N/a			
Democratic	John Winston Jones	—N/a			1	—N/a			1
Democratic	Philip N. Nicholas	—N/a			1	—N/a	19	41	11
Democratic	John Brockenbrough	—N/a				2	—N/a		
Whig	Thomas H. Bayly	—N/a						1	1
Total		163	163	164	164	164	164	164	146

== Bibliography ==
- Dent, Lynwood Miller (1974). The Virginia Democratic Party, 1824-1847. (Volumes I and II) (PhD thesis). [Baton Rouge]: Louisiana State University.
- Simms, Henry H. (1929). The Rise of the Whigs in Virginia, 1824–1840. Richmond: William Byrd Press.
- Virginia (1839). Journal of the House of Delegates [...]. Richmond.
