= Robert Stanard =

American judge and politician

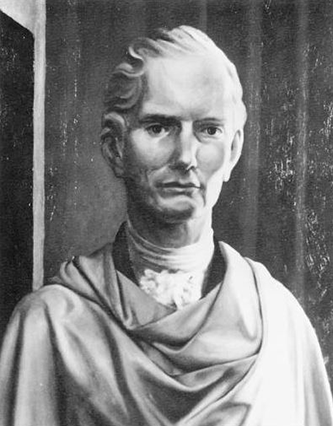

Justice of the Virginia Supreme Court
- In office January 19, 1839 – May 14, 1846
- Preceded by: William Brockenbrough
- Succeeded by: William Daniel

Member of the Virginia House of Delegates from Richmond City
- In office 1835–1837
- Preceded by: Chapman Johnson
- Succeeded by: unknown

16th Speaker of the Virginia House of Delegates
- In office 1816–1817
- Preceded by: Andrew Stevenson
- Succeeded by: Linn Banks

Member of the Virginia House of Delegates from Spotsylvania County
- In office 1808–1817 Serving with Stapleton Crutchfield, John Quarles, Carter L. Stevenson, John Mercer
- Preceded by: Hugh T. Mercer
- Succeeded by: Garrett Minor

Personal details
- Born: August 17, 1781 Spotsylvania County, Virginia, U.S.
- Died: May 14, 1846 (aged 64) Richmond, Virginia, U.S.
- Party: Whig (from 1835)
- Other political affiliations: Independent (1813-1835); Democratic-Republican (1808-1813)
- Spouse: Jane Stith Craig Stanard (m. 1812; died 1824)
- Children: 4
- Education: College of William and Mary
- Occupation: Lawyer, judge, politician

Robert Stanard (August 17, 1781 – May 14, 1846) was a Virginia lawyer, judge and political figure. He was the 16th Speaker of the Virginia House of Delegates and later a judge on the Virginia Supreme Court of Appeals.

== Early and family life ==
The son of William Stanard and Elizabeth Carter, Robert Stanard was born in Spotsylvania County, Virginia, on August 17, 1781. In 1798, he attended the College of William and Mary, where he studied law.

== Career ==
Admitted to the Virginia bar, Stanard began the private practice of law in Spotsylvania County and nearby Fredericksburg, Virginia through the War of 1812. Eventually he became a notable figure in the Richmond legal community.

He was first elected to the Virginia House of Delegates as one of the representatives (part-time) from Spotsylvania County, and was repeatedly re-elected. From 1816 to 1817, fellow delegates elected him as the 16th Speaker of the Virginia House of Delegates.

In 1817, he became the United States Attorney for the District of Virginia.

Stanard was later selected as a member of the Virginia Constitutional Convention of 1829-1830, which revised the Constitution of Virginia. His contribution to the convention were well received and increased his prominence. In 1839, he was elected to the Virginia Supreme Court of Appeals, upon the death of Judge William Brockenbrough. He remained on that court until his death in 1846.

== Personal life ==
Stanard married Jane Stith Craig on February 13, 1812, and fathered four children; Robert Craig (b. May 17, 1814), William Beverly (b. March 15, 1819), Mary Elizabeth (b. 1822) and Jane Stith (b. 1822). His son, Robert Craig Stanard, was a childhood friend of poet Edgar Allan Poe, and Jane Stith Craig was the subject of Poe's poem "To Helen". She died on April 28, 1824, at the age of 33 or 34, and Stanard never remarried. She is known posthumously as "Poe's Helen".

== Death and legacy ==
The town of Stanardsville, Virginia, is named after him.
