= John Brown Baldwin =

American politician (1820–1873)

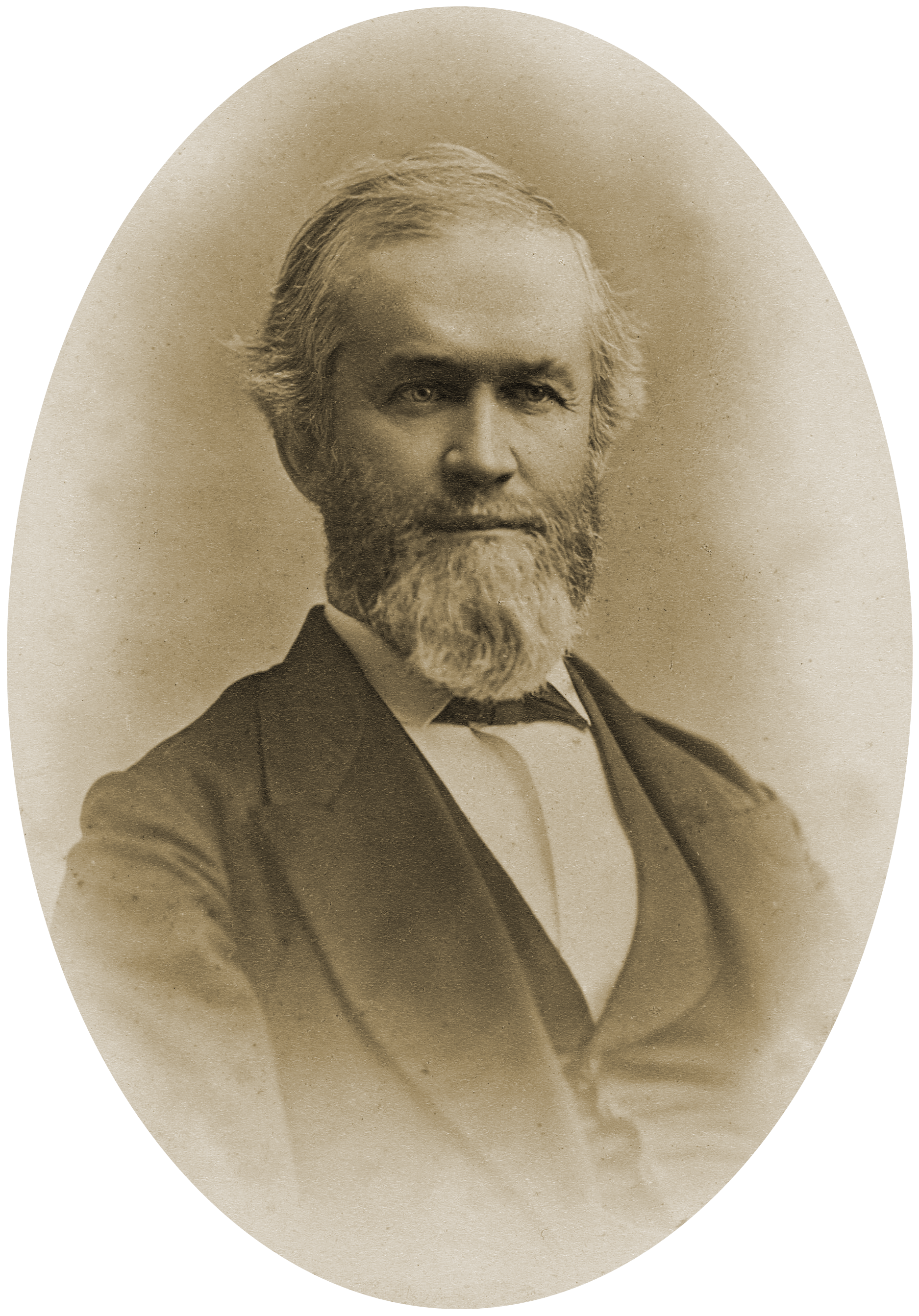
- Baldwin (c. 1860s–1870s)

Member of the Virginia House of Delegates from Augusta County, Virginia
- In office December 1, 1845 – December 6, 1846 Serving with Nathaniel Massie
- Preceded by: John G. Fulton
- Succeeded by: Hugh W. Sheffey

Member of the Confederate House of Representatives from Virginia
- In office February 1862 – March, 1865

Member of the Virginia House of Delegates from Augusta County, Virginia
- In office December 4, 1865 – October 4, 1869
- Preceded by: Hugh W. Sheffey
- Succeeded by: H.M. Bell

Speaker of the Virginia House of Delegates from Staunton, Virginia
- In office December 4, 1865 – 1869
- Preceded by: Hugh W. Sheffey
- Succeeded by: Zephaniah Turner Jr.

Personal details
- Born: 11 January 1820 Staunton, Virginia, US
- Died: 30 September 1873 (aged 53) Staunton, Virginia, US
- Resting place: Thornrose Cemetery, Staunton, Virginia
- Party: Democratic
- Other political affiliations: Conservative Party of Virginia
- Spouse: Susan Madison Peyton
- Parent: Briscoe Baldwin (father)
- Education: Staunton Academy
- Alma mater: University of Virginia
- Known for: Unionist, Delegate to Virginia's Secession Convention

John Brown Baldwin (January 11, 1820 – September 30, 1873) was a Virginia lawyer and Democratic politician, who served one term in Virginia House of Delegates before the Virginia Secession Convention of 1861, during which he was a Unionist. During the American Civil War, Baldwin believed his primary loyalty was to his state, and served as one of Virginia's representatives to the First and Second Confederate Congresses. He became one of the leading critics of President Jefferson Davis, who was seen by many as usurping the Confederacy's states' rights principles. During Congressional Reconstruction, Baldwin became Speaker of the Virginia House of Delegates.

== Early and family life ==
Baldwin was born on January 11, 1820, at Spring Farm near Staunton, Virginia, to Virginia delegate and future Court of Appeals judge Briscoe Gerald Baldwin and his wife Martha Steele Brown Baldwin. He had three sisters—Frances Cornelia Baldwin Stuart (1815-1885), Mary Eleanor Baldwin Ranson (1817-1880) and Margaret E. Baldwin Stuart (1823-1844), as well as a brother, Briscoe Gerard Baldwin Jr. (1828-1898). J.B. Baldwin graduated from Staunton Academy and then the University of Virginia in 1838. He was a member of the college's Board of Visitors from 1856–64.

He married Susan Madison Peyton, daughter of lawyer John Howe Peyton, on July 4, 1852, and after her death married Ann Lewis.

== Career ==
Baldwin read law under his father (who was elected to the Virginia Supreme Court of Appeals in 1842), then joined the law practice of his brother-in-law Alexander H. H. Stuart, although Baldwin ultimately established his own solo practice after becoming politically active.

=== Prewar politics ===
At age 24, he substituted for his Whig law partner Alexander H.H. Stuart during a debate before the 1844 election. During the next election, local Augusta County voters elected Baldwin to the Virginia House of Delegates (a part time position), and he served from 1845-1846, but was defeated by Whig Hugh W. Sheffey after one term, and resumed his law practice full time (although remaining politically active).

In 1859, Baldwin narrowly missed election to the Virginia Supreme Court of Appeals, William J. Robertson of Charlottesville being elected instead by the legislators. During the Presidential Election of 1860, Baldwin canvassed for John Bell, the Constitutional Unionist candidate, who won in Virginia but drew far fewer electoral college votes than either Republican Abraham Lincoln or Democrat Stephen A. Douglas.

Augusta County voters elected Baldwin, his brother in law, law partner and fellow Unionist Alexander H.H. Stuart and Unionist Democrat George Baylor to the Virginia Secession Convention, which began on February 13, 1861. On March 21, Baldwin began a pro-Union speech which lasted three days. On April 4, 1861, Baldwin represented the Convention's Unionist leadership at a secret one-hour interview with President Abraham Lincoln at the White House. He went to Washington hopeful that an agreement might be reached that would preserve the peace and hold Virginia in the Union. However, he returned to Richmond empty-handed, after finding that he and Lincoln had talked past each other. President Lincoln also separately met with another Unionist, John Minor Botts, who later blamed Baldwin for failing to publicize Lincoln's peace offer. The Unionists had temporarily managed to avoid secession while Baldwin met with Lincoln, but their majority collapsed shortly after his return to Richmond.

=== Confederate service ===
When the Convention decided upon secession, Baldwin's loyalty remained with his home state. He initially served as a militia colonel and inspector general of Virginia State Troops, accepting a commission on April 23, 1861. Initially a colonel of the 52nd Virginia Infantry, Baldwin resigned on May 1, 1862, because of ill health, becoming instead colonel of the Augusta Reserves regiment.

By year's end, Baldwin was elected as a representative from Augusta County, to the First Confederate Congress. He was later elected to the Second Confederate Congress (defeating incumbent Governor John Letcher) and served until the conclusion of the Civil War. He became one of Confederate President Jefferson Davis's most vocal critics.

=== Postwar ===
Following the war, Baldwin returned home and resumed his legal practice. After giving his loyalty oath to the federal government, he was elected to the Virginia House of Delegates under the post-war military provost in 1865-1867. On February 10, 1866, Baldwin testified before the Joint Committee on Reconstruction that Virginians would limit political rights granted to African Americans, which helped prompt Congressional Reconstruction. After Virginia's readmission to the Union, Baldwin continued representing Augusta County in the General Assembly. Fellow delegates chose him as their Speaker, and he served as such from 1865-1869. In this capacity, he drafted the procedural rules still in use in Virginia, known as "Baldwin's Rules."

When the Virginia Constitutional Convention of 1868 proposed to restrict former Confederates from holding further offices, which went beyond the terms of surrender at Appomattox Court House and caused considerable controversy within the Commonwealth, Baldwin joined with his brother-in-law Alexander H. H. Stuart and the Committee of Nine and met with General Ulysses S. Grant. Newly elected President Grant also met with provisional governor Henry H. Wells and businessmen Gilbert C. Walker and Franklin Stearns, then gave General (Secretary of War) John M. Schofield (and his successor General Canby) orders to allow separate votes on those two controversial provisions (each of which lost) and the new state Constitution without them (that passed overwhelmingly).

== Death and legacy ==
Baldwin died on September 30, 1873, after a brief illness. Staunton's businesses closed on the day of his funeral and all the city's church bells tolled (although not a member of any church, Baldwin considered himself Christian).

Political offices
Preceded by Hugh W. Sheffey	Speaker of the Virginia House of Delegates; 1865-1869	Succeeded by Zephaniah Turner, Jr.
