= Ivanhoe, Virginia =

Census-designated place in Virginia, US

Coordinates: 36°50′24″N 80°58′00″W

Ivanhoe is a census-designated place (CDP) in southern Wythe County, Virginia, United States, that straddles the border of Wythe and Carroll counties. As of the 2020 census, Ivanhoe had a population of 501. Ivanhoe is situated in the Appalachian Mountains along New River, and New River Trail State Park passes through Ivanhoe.

== Demographics ==
Historical population
Census	Pop.	Note	%±
2010	551		—
2020	501		−9.1%
U.S. Decennial Census; 2010 2020

Ivanhoe was first listed as a census designated place in the 2010 U.S. census.

According to the 2010 census, the CDP had a total population of 551, of whom 97.10% were White, 1.45% were American Indian or Alaska Native, 0.91 were some other race, 0.18% were two or more races. Of these, 1.45% were Hispanic or Latino of any race.

== History ==
Ivanhoe was the birthplace of Robert Sayers Sheffey, eccentric Methodist circuit rider and evangelist.

A nearby rock quarry and mines were no longer operating in 2018.

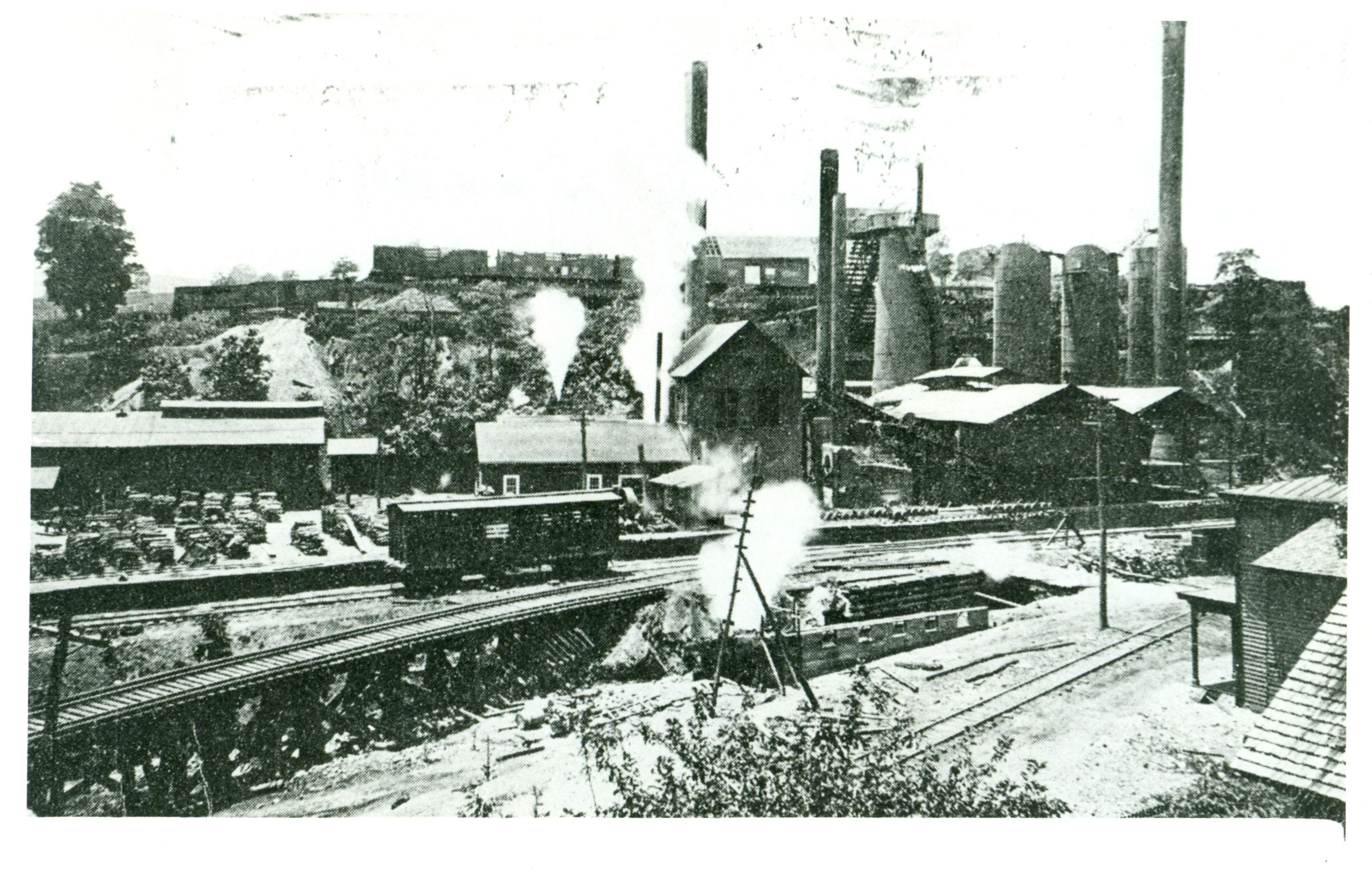
The Ivanhoe blast furnace which closed down in the 1910s

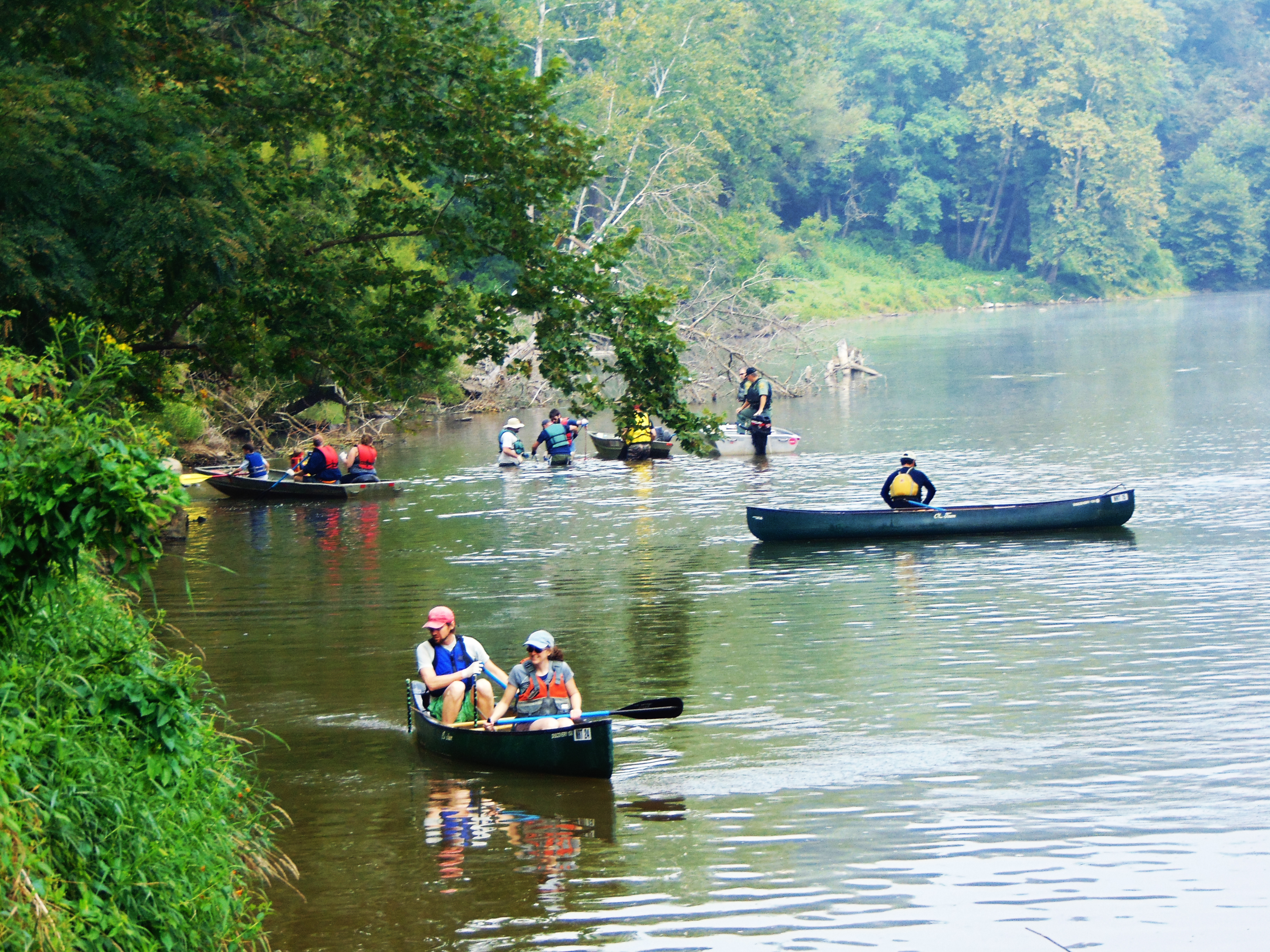
Cleanup day on the New River Trail State Park in 2013

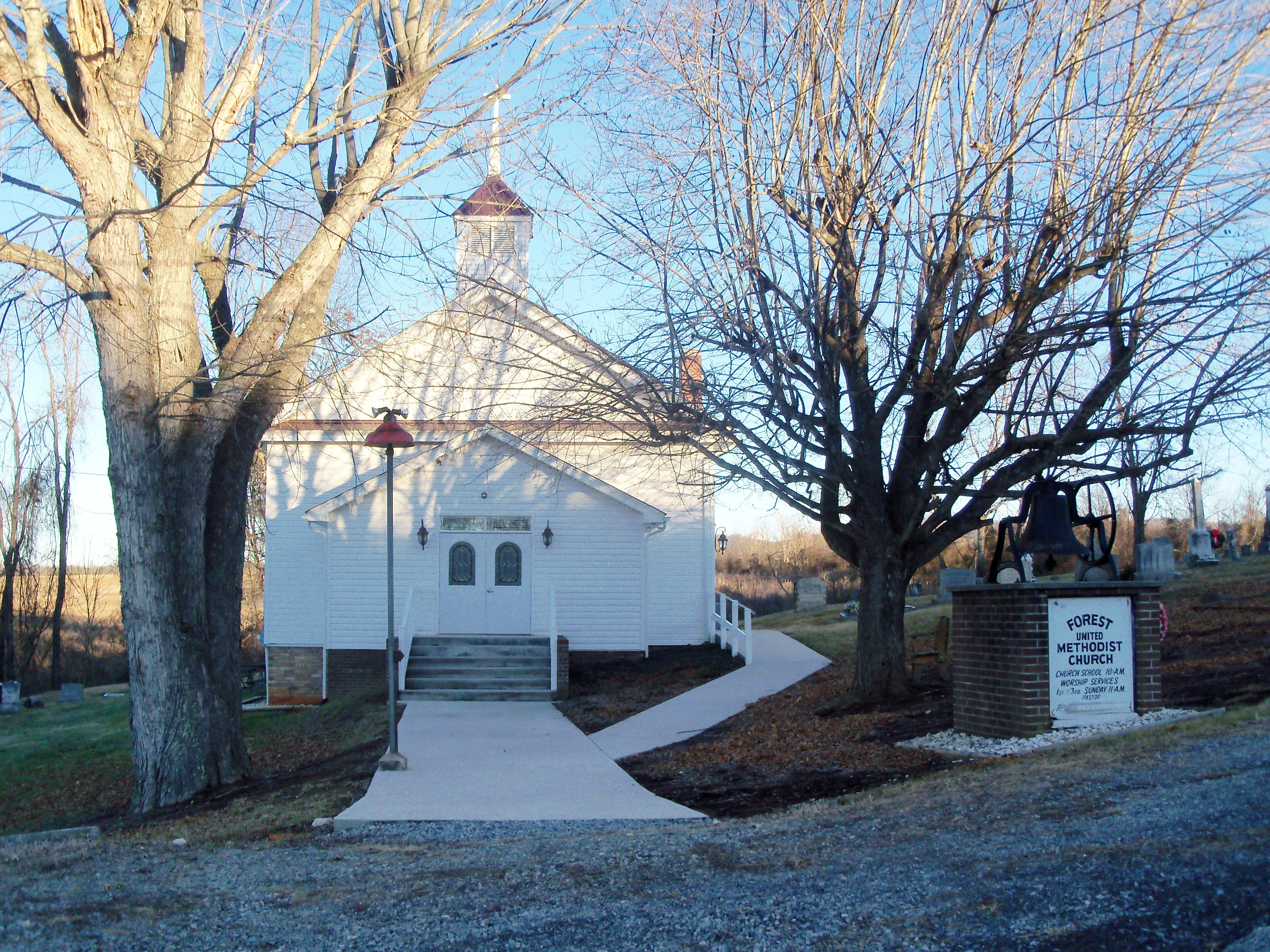
One of the churches in Ivanhoe

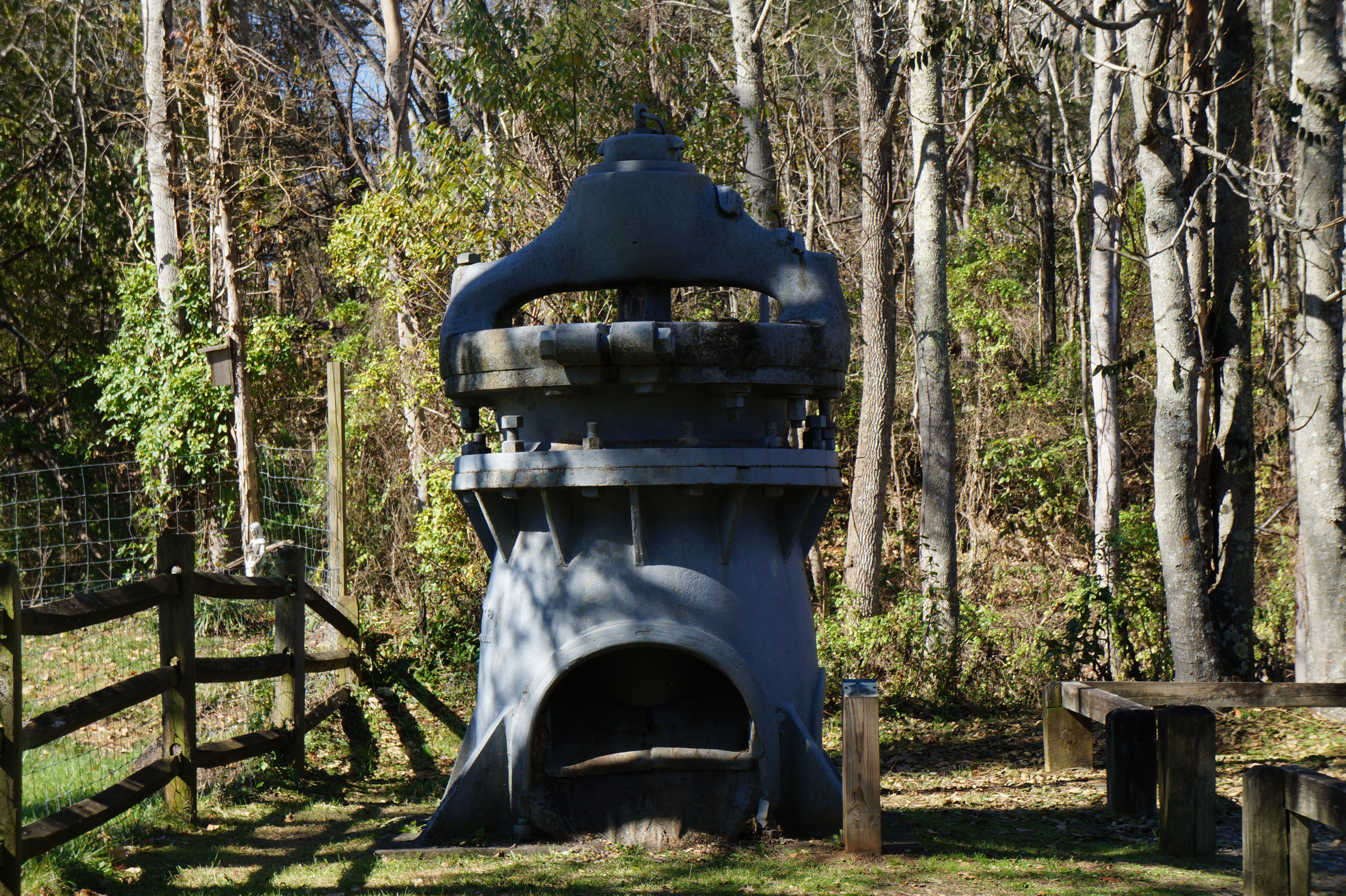
The Rock Crusher
