= Virginia Constitutional Convention of 1829–1830 =

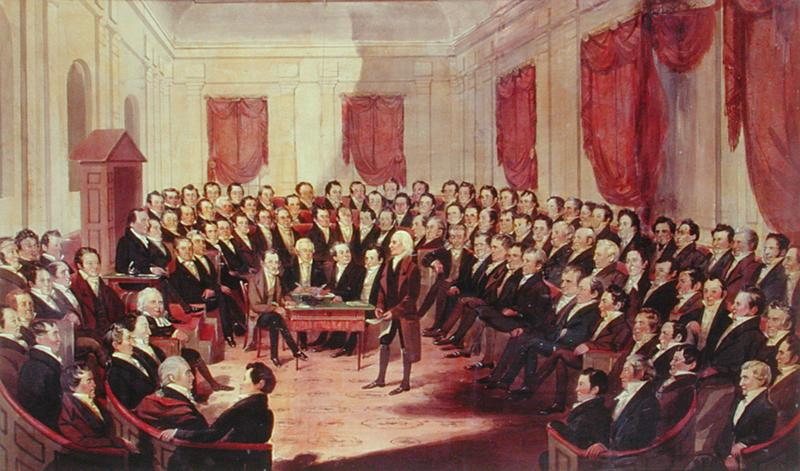
The Virginia Constitutional Convention, 1830, by George Catlin

The Virginia Constitutional Convention of 1829–1830 was a constitutional convention for the state of Virginia, held in Richmond from October 5, 1829, to January 15, 1830.

== Background and composition ==
Almost immediately, the Constitution of 1776 was recognized as flawed both for its restriction of the suffrage by property requirements, and for its malapportionment favoring the smaller eastern counties. Between 1801 and 1813, petitioners called on the Assembly to initiate a constitutional convention ten times. The House of Delegates passed a bill twice, but the conservative eastern planter majority in the Virginia Senate killed both measures. Continuing growth in the western parts of the state led to another fifteen years of agitation. Several counties in the Eastern Shore, northern Piedmont and western counties began opening polls for direct expression from the voters for a constitutional convention; eventually there were twenty-eight such counties calling for reform.

Malapportionment in the Assembly was seen as "a usurpation of the minority over the majority" by the slave owning eastern aristocracy. Partisans argued for apportionment by white population, versus "federal numbers" combining white population with three-fifths slaves, versus the existing system counting whites and slaves equally to favor the slave-holding eastern counties. After several General Assembly sessions with close votes for calling a convention, in 1828, the Assembly allowed for a statewide ballot for "Convention", "Neutral" or "No Convention". It passed by 56.8 percent, with most convention support coming from west of the Blue Ridge Mountains northwest to the Ohio River. But the easterners in the State Senate had stacked the deck in their favor, by apportioning the delegates by four per Senate district, producing a group of men which was more wealthy and more conservative than the House of Delegates.

The last "gathering of giants" from the Revolutionary generation included former presidents James Madison and James Monroe, and sitting Chief Justice John Marshall. But three generations were represented among those who would serve in public office including three presidents, seven U.S. Senators, fifteen U.S. Representatives and four governors. The other delegates to the Convention were sitting judges or members of the Virginia General Assembly.

== Meeting and debate ==
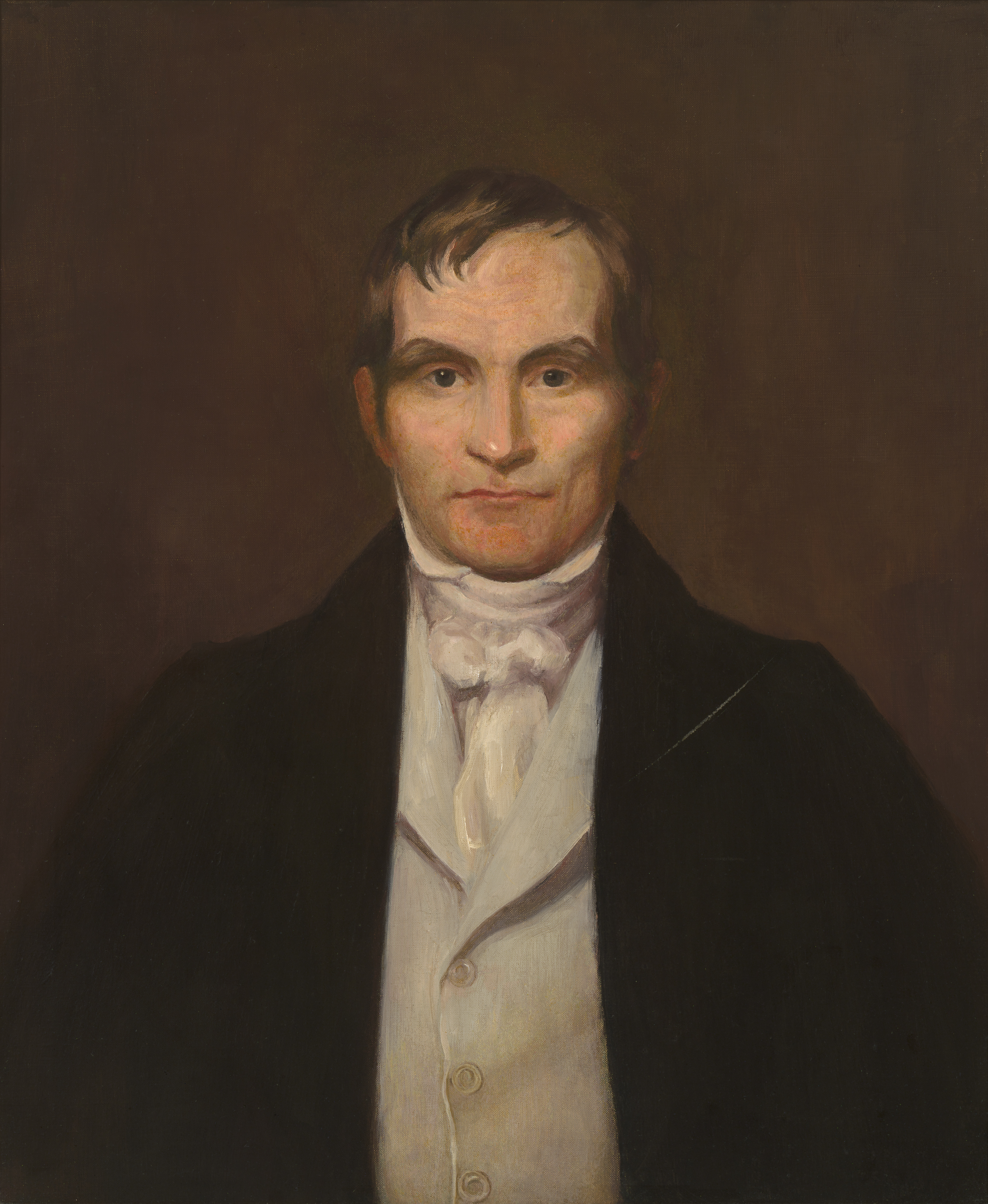
Philip P. Barbour, presiding officer

The Convention met from October 5, 1829 – January 15, 1830, and elected former president James Monroe of Loudoun its presiding officer. On December 8, Monroe withdrew due to failing health, and the Convention elected Philip P. Barbour as its new presiding officer. Barbour was a former Speaker of the U.S. House of Representatives, a sitting federal district judge, and a future Justice on the Supreme Court. Conservatives among the Old Republicans such as John Randolph of Roanoke feared any change from the Founders' 1776 Constitution would lead to an ideological anarchy of "wild abstractions" imposed by egalitarian "French Jacobins" through "this maggot of innovation". In answer, John Marshall advanced his view with a petition from the freeholders of Richmond which observed that, "Virtue, intelligence, are not among the products of the soil. Attachment to [slave] property, often a sordid sentiment, is not to be confounded with the sacred flame of patriots." Any white male who had served in the War of 1812 or who would serve in the militia in there future defense of the country deserved the right to vote.

Abel P. Upshur, a judge on the Virginia General Court, spoke for conservatives when he asserted that there "is a majority of interest as well as a majority in number". Because both persons and property were the "elements of society", majority rule by the people alone was not an equitable solution. "Those who have the greatest [property] stake in the Government…[must] have the greatest share of power in the administration of it." Lawyer John R. Cooke, a veteran of the War of 1812 countered that delegates must base the Constitution and legislative representation on the wishes of citizens, "the white population…[looking] to the people" for its authority, not only the wealthy, not to sectional slave-holding interests, and "not to the supposed rights of the [unequally populated] counties."

Reformers' efforts to adopt direct popular election of the Governor were defeated in favor of continuing election by the General Assembly. Thomas Jefferson Randolph, Thomas Jefferson's grandson, proposed gradual emancipation, a suggestion which never made it out of committee onto the Convention floor. The reformers lost on almost every issue. Nevertheless, even with the exaggerated Virginia Senate representation apportioning the delegates in favor of the status quo, the three most important roll calls were close. The "white" population basis of apportioning the General Assembly failed by two votes. The extension of the vote to all free white males failed by two votes. When the popular election of governor passed on its first vote, it failed on reconsideration. The divisions which would lead to West Virginia's split were evident. Regardless of the various ideologies represented or delegate political affiliation, the final vote 55 for the proposed Constitution to 40 against was along an east-west divide. Only one delegate voted yes from west of the Blue Ridge Mountains.

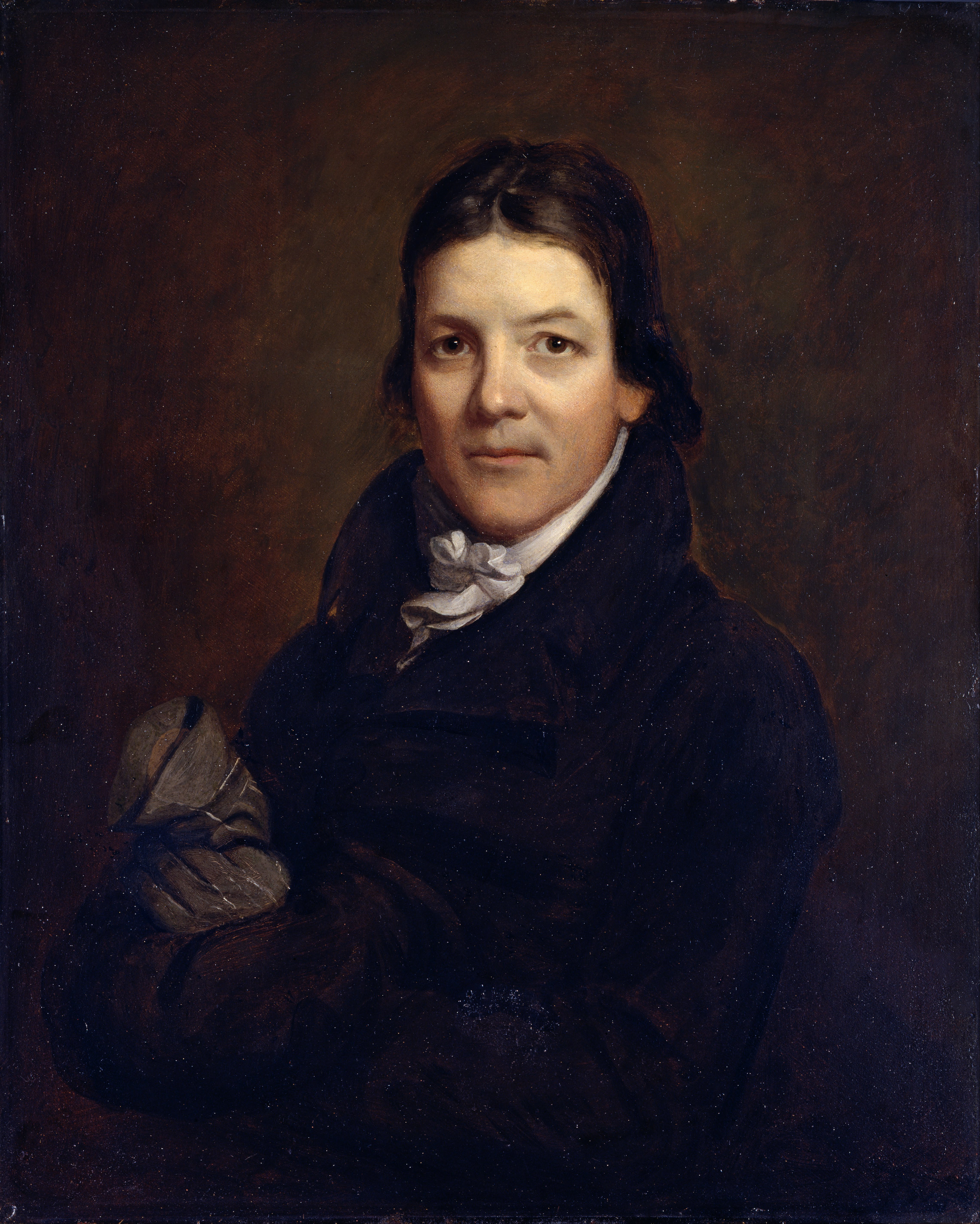
John Randolph
Conservative

John Marshall
Reformer

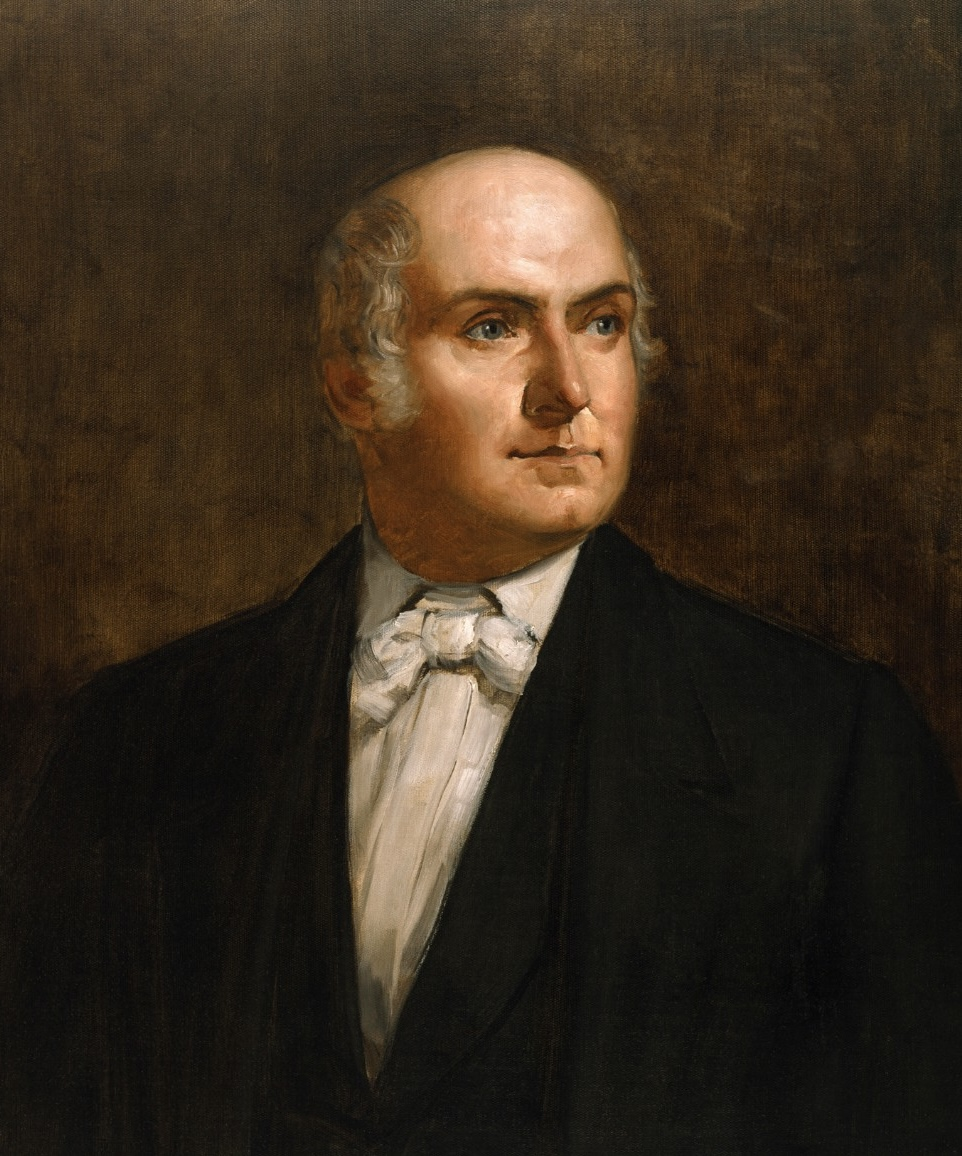
Abel P. Upshur
Conservative

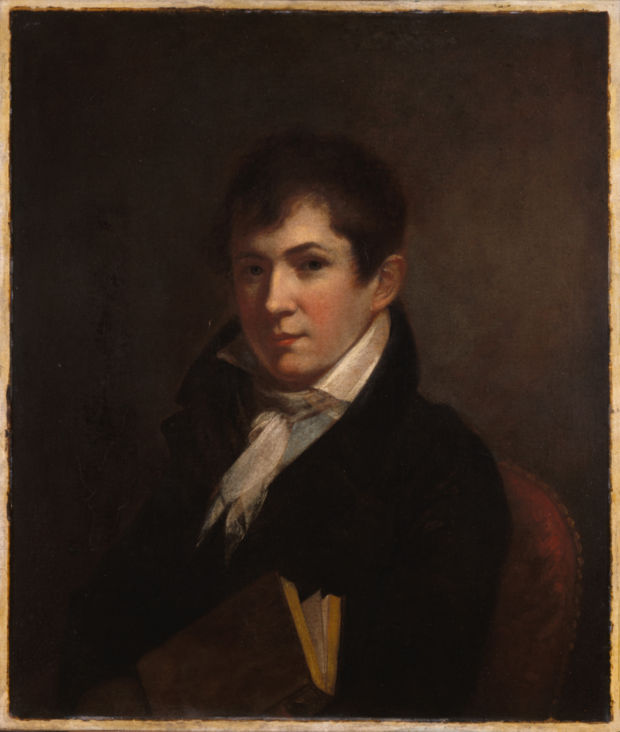
Thomas J. Randolph
for gradual emancipation

== Outcomes ==
Capitol at Richmond, where Convention of 1829–30 met

Some malapportionment in the General Assembly was eased relative to the majority of voters and white population in the Valley in the House of Delegates, but nothing for the transmontane west. Some suffrage restrictions were modified to include long term leaseholders and male heads of household. The Constitution of 1830 was a "triumph of traditionalism."

Historical accounts of the convention often relay interpretations of Hugh B. Grigsby that emphasize it as the "last gathering of giants." This approach typically omits names of the western reformers like Philip Doddridge who called for the convention in the first place. The "triumph of traditionalism" largely maintained traditional malapportionment preserving slaveowners’ disproportionate political power. This contributed to western Virginia counties’ later secession and formation of West Virginia led by Doddridge protégé Waitman T. Willey.

== Delegates ==
The delegates to the Convention were elected in May and June, 1829. Each of the 24 senatorial districts sent four delegates to the convention, for a total of 96 members. Three districts elected another delegate to replace a vacant seat.

District	Delegate	County	Current Office	Former Offices	Future Offices	Notes
1	John B. George	Tazewell	Assembly Delegate			
1	Andrew McMilian	Lee	Assembly Delegate			
1	Edward Campbell	Washington				
1	William Byars	Washington	Assembly Delegate			
2	Gordon Cloyd	Montgomery				
2	Henley Chapman	Giles	Assembly Senator			
2	John P. Mathews	Wythe				
2	William Oglesby	Grayson	Assembly Delegate			
3	George Townes	Pittsylvania	Assembly Senator			
3	Benjamin W. S. Cabell	Pittsylvania	Assembly Senator			
3	Joseph Martin	Henry	Assembly Senator			
3	Archibald Stuart	Patrick			U.S. Representative	
4	John Randolph	Charlotte		U.S. Senator; U.S. Representative		
4	William Leigh	Halifax			Judge of the Virginia General Court	
4	Richard Logan	Halifax	Assembly Senator			
4	Richard N. Venable	Prince Edward	President of the Upper Appomattox Canal Co.			
5	William Henry Brodnax	Dinwiddie	Brigadier General, Virginia Militia			
5	George C. Groomgoole	Brunswick				
5	Mark Alexander	Mecklenburg		U.S. Representative		
5	William O. Goode	Mechlenburg			U.S. Representative	
6	John Y. Mason	Southampton			U.S. Representative, U.S. District Judge, Secretary of State, Secretary of the Navy	
6	James Trezvant	Southampton	U.S. Representative			
6	Augustine Claiborne	Greensville	Virginia Delegate			
6	John Urquhart	Southampton				
7	Littleton W. Tazewell	Norfolk Borough	U.S. Senator		Governor of Virginia	
7	Joseph Prentis	Nansemond				
7	Robert B. Taylor	Norfolk Borough				Resigned
7	Hugh Blair Grigsby^{[1]}	Norfolk Borough	Assembly Delegate			
8	George Loyall	Norfolk Borough	U.S. Representative			
8	Thomas R. Joynes	Accomack	Assembly Delegate			
8	Thomas M. Bayly	Accomack		U.S. Representative		
8	Calvin H. Read	Northampton	Assembly Delegate			Died
9	Abel P. Upshur	Northampton	Justice of the Virginia General Court		Secretary of the Navy; Secretary of State	
9	John Marshall	Richmond City	U.S. Chief Justice			
9	John Tyler	Charles City	U.S. Senator		President of the U.S.	
9	Philip N. Nicholas	Richmond City	Judge of the Virginia General Court			
10	John B. Clopton	New Kent	Assembly Senator		Judge of the Virginia General Court and Circuit Court	
10	John Winston Jones	Chesterfield			U.S. Representative	
10	Benjamin W. Leigh	Chesterfield			U.S. Senator	
10	Samuel Taylor	Chesterfield	Assembly Senator			
11	William B. Giles	Amelia	Governor			
11	William Campbell	Bedford	Assembly Senator			
11	Samuel Claytor	Campbell				
11	Callowhill Mennis	Bedford				Resigned
11	James Saunders	Campbell	Assembly Senator			
12	Andrew Beirne	Monroe			U.S. Representative	
12	William Smith	Greenbrier		U.S. Representative		
12	Fleming B. Miller	Botetourt	Assembly Senator			
12	John Baxter	Pocahontas	Assembly Senator			
13	Edwin S. Duncan	Harrison	Assembly Senator			
13	John Laidley	Cabell	Assembly Delegate			
13	Lewis Summers	Kanawha	Assembly Delegate			
13	Adam See	Randolph	Assembly Delegate			
14	Philip Doddridge	Brooke	U.S. Representative			
14	Charles S. Morgan	Monongalia	Assembly Senator			
14	Alexander Campbell	Brooke	Ordained minister, leader of the Disciples of Christ		Founder and president of Bethany College	
14	Eugenius M. Wilson	Monongalia				
15	Briscoe G. Baldwin	Augusta	Major General, Virginia Militia		Justice of the Virginia Supreme Court	
15	Chapman Johnson	Augusta	Assembly Senator			
15	William McCoy	Pendleton	U.S. Representative			
15	Samuel M. Moore	Rockbridge			U.S. Representative	
16	James Pleasants	Goochland		U.S. Senator; Governor of Virginia		
16	William F. Gordon	Albemarle	U.S. Representative			
16	Lucas P. Thompson	Amherst	Assembly Delegate			
16	Thomas Massie, Jr.	Nelson	Assembly Delegate			
17	James Madison	Orange		President of the U.S.		
17	Philip P. Barbour	Orange	U.S. District Judge	Speaker of the House	Justice of the U.S. Supreme Court	Elected Presiding Officer after Monroe resigned the office
17	David Watson	Louisa	Assembly Delegate			Died without attending
17	Robert Stanard	Spotsylvania	Virginia Justice			
18	John Roane	King William	U.S. Representative			
18	William P. Taylor	Caroline	U.S. Representative			
18	Richard Morris	Hanover	Assembly Delegate			
18	James M. Garnett	Essex		U.S. Representative		
18	William A. G. Dade	Prince William	Assembly Senator			Died
19	Ellyson Currie	Lancaster		Assembly Senator		
19	John Taliaferro	King George		U.S. Representative		
19	Fleming Bates	Northumberland				
19	John S. Barbour	Culpeper	U.S. Representative			
19	John Scott	Fauquier	Assembly Senator			
20	John Macrae	Fauquier	Assembly Delegate			(1829 session)
20	Thomas Marshall	Fauquier	Assembly Delegate			(1830 session)
20	John W. Green	Culpeper	Virginia Justice			
20	Peachy Harrison	Rockingham	Assembly Senator			
21	Jacob Williamson	Rockingham				
21	William Anderson	Shenandoah	Assembly Delegate			
21	Samuel Coffman	Shenandoah				
21	William Naylor	Hampshire	Assembly Delegate			
22	William Donaldson	Hampshire	Assembly Senator			
22	Elisha Boyd	Berkeley	Assembly Delegate	Brigadier General, Virginia Militia	Assembly Senator	
22	Philip Pendleton	Berkeley	U.S. Judge			
22	John R. Cooke	Frederick				
23	Alfred H. Powell	Frederick		U.S. Representative		
23	Hierome L. Opie	Jefferson				Resigned
23	James M. Mason	Jefferson			U.S. Senator	
23	Thomas Griggs, Jr.	Jefferson	Assembly Delegate			
24	James Monroe	Loudoun		President of the U.S.		First Presiding Officer
24	Charles F. Mercer	Loudoun	U.S. Representative			
24	William H. Fitzhugh	Fairfax	Assembly Senator			
24	Richard H. Henderson	Loudoun				

=== Districts ===
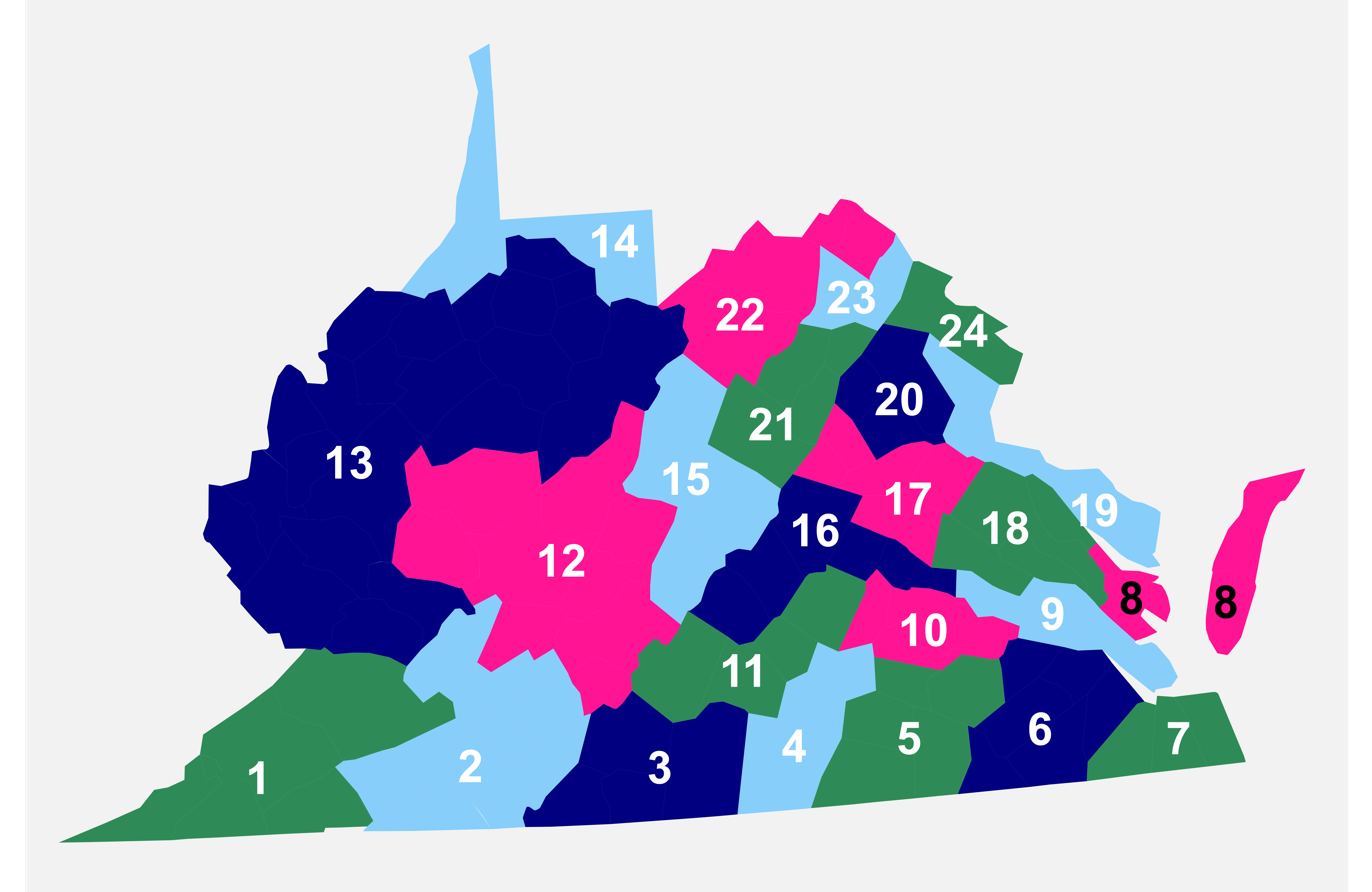
Approximate districts for the convention. Each district had 4 representatives.

Districts are numbered as follows for the table and map:

1. Washington, Lee, Scott, Russell and Tazewell
2. Wythe, Montgomery, Grayson and Giles
3. Franklin, Patrick, Henry and Pittsylvania
4. Charlotte, Halifax, and Prince Edward
5. Brunswick, Dinwiddie, Lunenburg, and Mecklenburg
6. Sussex, Surry, Southampton, Isle of Wight, Prince George, Greensville
7. Norfolk, Princess Anne, Nansemond and Borough of Norfolk
8. Mathews, Middlesex, Accomack, Northampton and Gloucester
9. City of Williamsburg, Charles City, Elizabeth City, James City, City of Richmond, Henrico, New Kent, Warwick and York
10. Amelia, Chesterfield, Cumberland, Nottoway, Powhatan and Town of Petersburg
11. Campbell, Buckingham and Bedford
12. Monroe, Greenbriar, Bath, Botetourt, Alleghany, Pocahontas, Nicholas
13. Kanawha, Mason, Cabell, Randolph, Harrison, Lewis, Wood and Logan
14. Ohio, Tyler, Brooke, Monongalia and Preston
15. Augusta, Rockbridge, Pendleton
16. Albemarle, Amherst, Nelson, Fluvanna and Goochland
17. Spotsylvania, Louisa, Orange, and Madison
18. King William, King and Queen, Essex, Caroline and Hanover
19. King George, Westmoreland, Lancaster, Northumberland, Richmond, Stafford and Prince William
20. Fauquier and Culpeper
21. Shenandoah and Rockingham
22. Hampshire, Hardy, Berkeley and Morgan
23. Frederick and Jefferson
24. Loudoun and Fairfax

== See also ==
- Virginia Conventions

== Bibliography ==
- Andrews, Matthew Page (1937). Virginia, the Old Dominion. Doubleday, Doran & Company. ASIN B0006E942K.
- Gutzman, Kevin R.C. (2007). Virginia's American Revolution: from Dominion to Republic, 1776-1840. Lexington Books. ISBN 978-0-7391-2131-3.
- Heinemann, Ronald L. (2008). Old Dominion, New Commonwealth: a history of Virginia, 1607-2007. University of Virginia Press. ISBN 978-0-8139-2769-5.
- Pulliam, David Loyd (1901). The Constitutional Conventions of Virginia from the foundation of the Commonwealth to the present time. John T. West, Richmond. OCLC 6407098.
- Richards, Samuel J. (Fall 2019). "Reclaiming Congressman Philip Doddridge from Tidewater Cultural Imperialism". West Virginia History: A Journal of Regional Studies. 13 (2): 1–26. doi:10.1353/wvh.2019.0019. S2CID 211648744.
- Shade, William G. (1996). Democratizing the Old Dominion: Virginia and the Second Party System, 1824–1861. University of Virginia Press. ISBN 978-0-8139-1654-5.
