= Samuel Taylor (Virginia politician) =

American politician

- Born: September 15, 1781; Cumberland County, Virginia, U.S.
- Died: February 23, 1853 (aged 71); Richmond, Virginia, U.S.
- Education: Needham Law School, Cumberland County VA
- Occupations: Lawyer, Legislator
- Title: Delegate, state Senator

Samuel Taylor (September 1781 – February 23, 1853) was a 19th-century American politician and lawyer from Virginia.

== Early life ==
Taylor was born in Cumberland County and attended the Needham Law School in Cumberland County operated by Chancellor Creed Taylor. He then practiced law in his home county.

== Career ==
The Virginia Capitol at Richmond VA where 19th century Conventions met

At the age of thirty-six, he was elected to the Virginia General Assembly from Cumberland County, and served there from 1816 to 1819. A decade later, he returned to the General Assembly, this time serving in the Virginia State Senate from 1826 to 1829. While there, Taylor collaborated with Thomas Jefferson, who was then a private citizen, and assisted State Senator Joseph C. Cabell in passing the bill establishing the University of Virginia.

From 1829 to 1830, Taylor served as a delegate to the Virginia Constitutional Convention known as the "Last Gathering of Giants". He was one of four serving at the convention from the Senatorial District of Amelia, Chesterfield, Cumberland, Nottoway, Powhatan Counties and the town of Petersburg. When it elected its officers, the convention chose Taylor to chair of the Bill of Rights Committee.

In 1846, Samuel Taylor defended Thomas Ritchie, Jr., the son of the Richmond Enquirer's Thomas Ritchie for killing John Hampden Pleasants, the editor of the Richmond Whig in a duel.

== Death ==
Samual Taylor died February 23, 1853, in Richmond, Virginia.

== Bibliography ==
- Hall, Claude Hampton (1964). Abel Parker Upshur, conservative Virginian, 1790-1844. State Historical Society of Wisconsin. ISBN 9780870200380.
- Pulliam, David Loyd (1901). The Constitutional Conventions of Virginia from the foundation of the Commonwealth to the present time. John T. West, Richmond. ISBN 978-1-2879-2059-5.
