= J. Marshall Hanger =

American politician

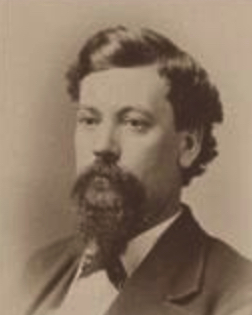
- Portrait of Hanger, 1874

31st Speaker of the Virginia House of Delegates
- In office December 6, 1871 – December 5, 1877
- Preceded by: Zephaniah Turner Jr.
- Succeeded by: Henry C. Allen

Member of the Virginia House of Delegates for Augusta and Staunton City
- In office October 5, 1869 – December 5, 1883
- Preceded by: George Baylor
- Succeeded by: Edward Echols

Personal details
- Born: James Marshall Hanger; November 12, 1833 Waynesboro, Virginia, U.S.
- Died: August 26, 1912 (aged 78) Staunton, Virginia, U.S.
- Party: Democratic; Conservative
- Education: University of Virginia

Military service
- Allegiance: Confederate States
- Branch/service: Confederate States Army
- Years of service: 1861–1865
- Rank: Major
- Unit: Cavalry Corps, Army of Northern Virginia
- Battles/wars: American Civil War

James Marshall Hanger (November 12, 1833 – August 26, 1912) was a Virginia politician. He represented Augusta County in the Virginia House of Delegates, and served as that body's Speaker from 1871 until 1877. He was elected over C. P. Ramsdell.

In 1881 Isaac C. Fowler was elected speaker over him.

The Hanger family established itself in Augusta County in 1750 with Peter Hanger's arrival from Pennsylvania.
