= Briscoe Baldwin =

American judge

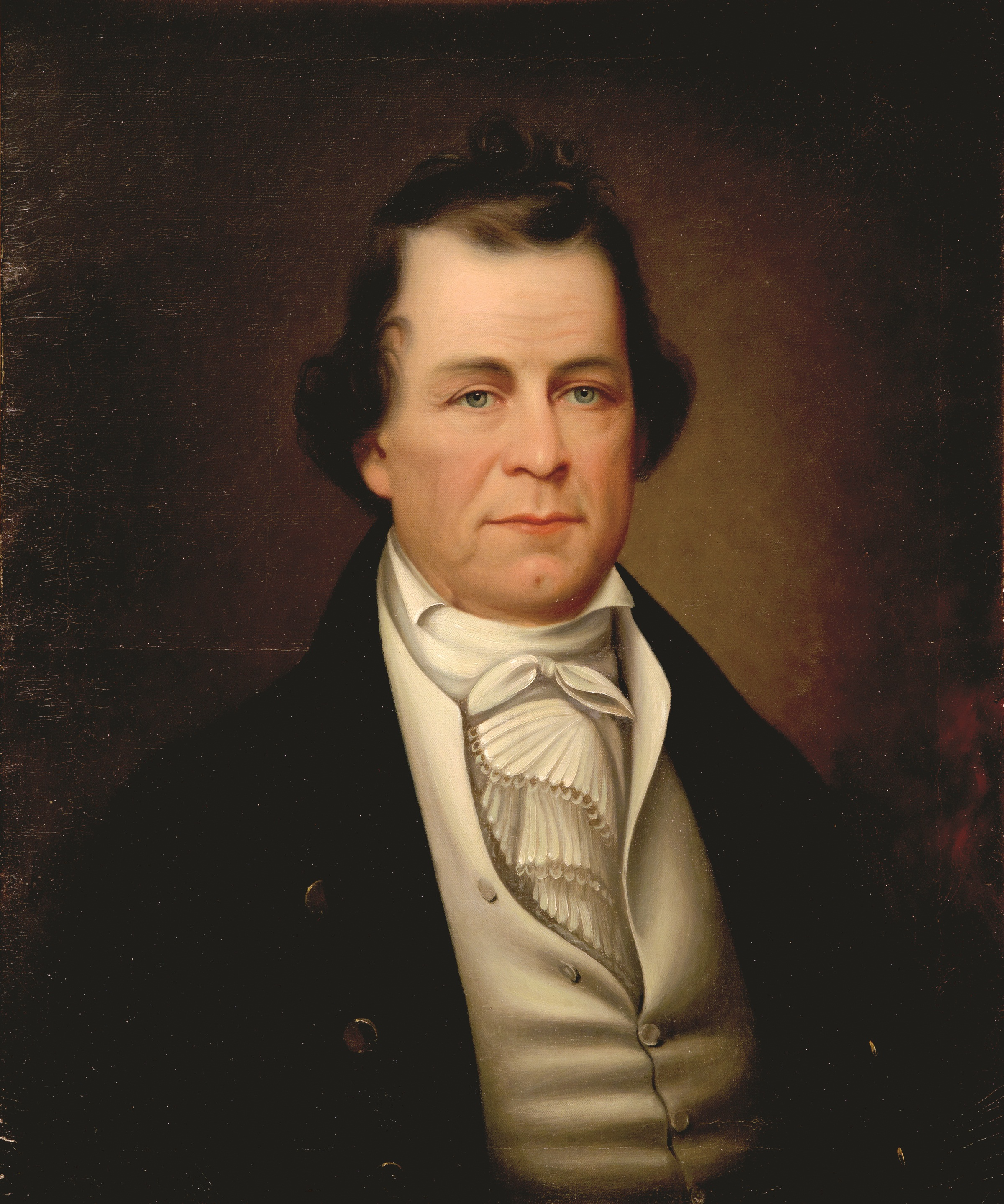
- Painted portrait of Briscoe Baldwin, 1903, by John Pleasants Walker

Justice of the Virginia Supreme Court
- In office January 29, 1842 – May 18, 1852

Member of the Virginia House of Delegates for Augusta County
- In office December 7, 1818 – December 3, 1820 Serving with Andrew Anderson
- Preceded by: Samuel Clarke
- Succeeded by: John M. Estill
- In office December 2, 1822 – November 30, 1823 Serving with Daniel Sheffey
- Preceded by: John Wayt
- Succeeded by: Thomas Jefferson Stuart
- In office December 6, 1841 – January 1842 Serving with William Kinney
- Preceded by: Gerard B. Stuart
- Succeeded by: Robert S. Brooke

Personal details
- Born: January 18, 1789 Winchester, Virginia
- Died: May 18, 1852 (aged 63) Staunton, Virginia
- Spouse: Martha Steele Brown (m. 1811)
- Children: 6, including John
- Education: College of William and Mary
- Profession: lawyer, politician, judge

Briscoe Gerard Baldwin (January 18, 1789 – May 18, 1852) was a Virginia attorney, politician, and jurist, who served four terms in the Virginia House of Delegates, at the Virginia Constitutional Convention of 1829-1830, and a decade in the Virginia Supreme Court of Appeals.

== Early and family life ==
Baldwin was born in early 1789 in Winchester, the county seat of Frederick County, Virginia, to revolutionary war surgeon, Dr. Cornelius Baldwin (1754-1826) and his wife, the former Margaret Briscoe (1766-1808). The boy (and many later relatives) were named after his maternal grandfather, Col. Gerard Briscoe. He had nine siblings and one half sister, his widowed father remarrying twice. After attending private schools around Winchester, young Baldwin traveled to Williamsburg to study at the College of William and Mary, from which he graduated in 1807. During the War of 1812, he recruited and led a group of mounted riflemen, serving as a Captain.

Briscoe Baldwin read law under his brother-in-law Judge William Daniel Sr. further down the Shenandoah Valley in Cumberland County, although Judge Daniel would later move to nearby Lynchburg since his judicial district also encompassed Campbell County, of which Lynchburg was the county seat. Judge Daniel's son William Daniel would later sit beside his uncle on the Supreme Court of Appeals.

In 1811, Baldwin married Martha Steele Brown, the daughter of John Brown (1762-1826), Revolutionary soldier who first settled in Bedford County near Lynchburg, but later became the first chancellor (judge in equity) of Augusta County. His mother-in-law was the former Frances Peyton (of the First Families of Virginia)(1762-1851), who moved to Staunton from Prince William County, Virginia and who survived her husband and daughter. The Baldwins lived at "Spring Hill Farm", a house built by Hessian prisoners during the American Revolutionary War. Briscoe and Martha Baldwin had six children before her death: Frances Cornelia Baldwin Stuart (1815–1885), Mary Eleanor Baldwin Ranson (1817–1880), John Brown Baldwin (1820–1873), Margaret E Baldwin Stuart (1823–1844), James William Baldwin (1828–1875), and Briscoe Gerard Baldwin (1828–1898).

Like both the elder and younger judges Daniel, Judge Baldwin also owned enslaved people during most (if not all) of his life. In the 1820 federal census, he owned six enslaved people—two boys and two girls under age 14, and two women, one under age 28 and one younger than 44 years old. In the final census of his life, Baldwin owned 22 and 35 year old Black women. In the final federal census of his life, he owned two enslaved people.

== Career ==
The Virginia Capitol at Richmond where 19th century Conventions met

After admission to the Virginia bar, Baldwin began a private legal practice in Staunton, the county seat of Augusta County.

Augusta County voters elected him to represent them in the Virginia House of Delegates four times, beginning in December 1818, when he and Andrew Anderson replaced the incumbents and were both re-elected in 1819, but neither won in 1820. Baldwin won election again to that part-time position in 1822 and served alongside Daniel Sheffey, but neither won re-election the following year. Baldwin again won election in 1841, but failed to complete his term, resigning after fellow legislators appointed him to a vacant seat on the Virginia Court of Appeals. During his last term, Baldwin proposed to move the state Capital from Richmond to Staunton, as more centrally located, although such was not adopted.

During his legislative service and private legal career, Baldwin continued his military service leading Augusta county's militia, and eventually attained the rank of Major-General of Virginia militia. Judge Baldwin also delivered the oration at the celebration at the Jamestown Jubilee in 1822.

During Virginia's great debates over representation of western Virginia and the future of slavery in the Virginia Constitutional Convention of 1829-1830, Baldwin represented Augusta and adjacent Rockbridge and Pendleton counties alongside Chapman Johnson, William McCoy and Samuel McD Moore. He served on the Convention's Judicial Committee. Beginning in 1831, Baldwin also began a law school in his Staunton home.

On January 29, 1842, fellow delegates elected Baldwin to fill a vacancy on the Virginia Court of Appeals, the state's highest court. He held this position until his death.

== Death ==
Briscoe G. Baldwin died on May 18, 1852, in Staunton, Virginia, survived by his widow, as well as two sons and two married daughters by his first wife. His son John Brown Baldwin would follow his father's legal, military and legislative path, including partnership with Alexander H.H. Stuart, and nearly won appointment to the Virginia Court of Appeals in 1859. J.B. Baldwin followed his father's political path by winning election to represent Augusta County in the Virginia House of Delegates, once before the American Civil War and also winning election to the Virginia Secession Convention of 1861. Although he opposed secession, J.B. Baldwin briefly served as colonel of the 52nd Virginia Infantry during the conflict, resigning his commission in order to represent Staunton and the surrounding region in the Confederate States Congress, during which he became one of President Jefferson Davis' most vocal critics. J.B. Baldwin again won election to the Virginia House of Delegates during Congressional Reconstruction, and fellow delegates elected him Speaker.

A large collection consisting almost solely of the legal, financial, and personal correspondence of Archibald Stuart and Briscoe Baldwin, lawyers from Staunton, and their related family letters is housed at the University of Virginia.

== Bibliography ==
- Encyclopedia of Virginia Biography; Volume 2 (Lyon Gardiner Tyler ed.). Lewis Historical Publishing Company. 1915. pp. 65–66. ISBN 1177835193. "Briscoe Baldwin."
- Ranson, Thomas D. (1895). "Judge Briscoe G. Baldwin". The Virginia Law Register. 1 (3): 236–237. doi:10.2307/1098643. JSTOR 1098643.
- Pulliam, David Loyd (1901). The Constitutional Conventions of Virginia from the foundation of the Commonwealth to the present time. John T. West, Richmond. ISBN 978-1-2879-2059-5.
