= Zephaniah Turner Jr. =

American politician (1812–1876)

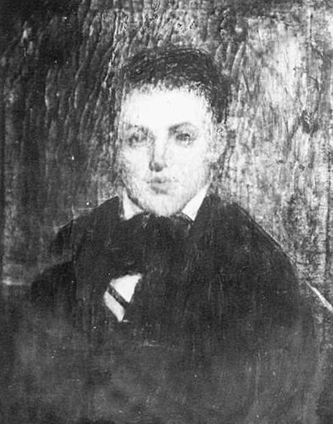

30th Speaker of the Virginia House of Delegates
- In office October 5, 1869 – December 6, 1871
- Preceded by: John Brown Baldwin
- Succeeded by: J. Marshall Hanger

Member of the Virginia House of Delegates from Rappahannock County
- In office December 4, 1865 – December 6, 1871
- Preceded by: John T. Fletcher
- Succeeded by: William G. Miller

Personal details
- Born: December 4, 1812 Culpeper, Virginia, U.S.
- Died: March 3, 1876 (aged 63) Woodville, Virginia, U.S.
- Party: Conservative

Zephaniah Turner Jr. (December 4, 1812 – March 3, 1876) was a Virginia politician. He represented Rappahannock County in the Virginia House of Delegates, and served as that body's Speaker from 1869 until 1871.
