= Robert Sheffey =

American Methodist preacher (1820–1902)

Robert Sayers Sheffey
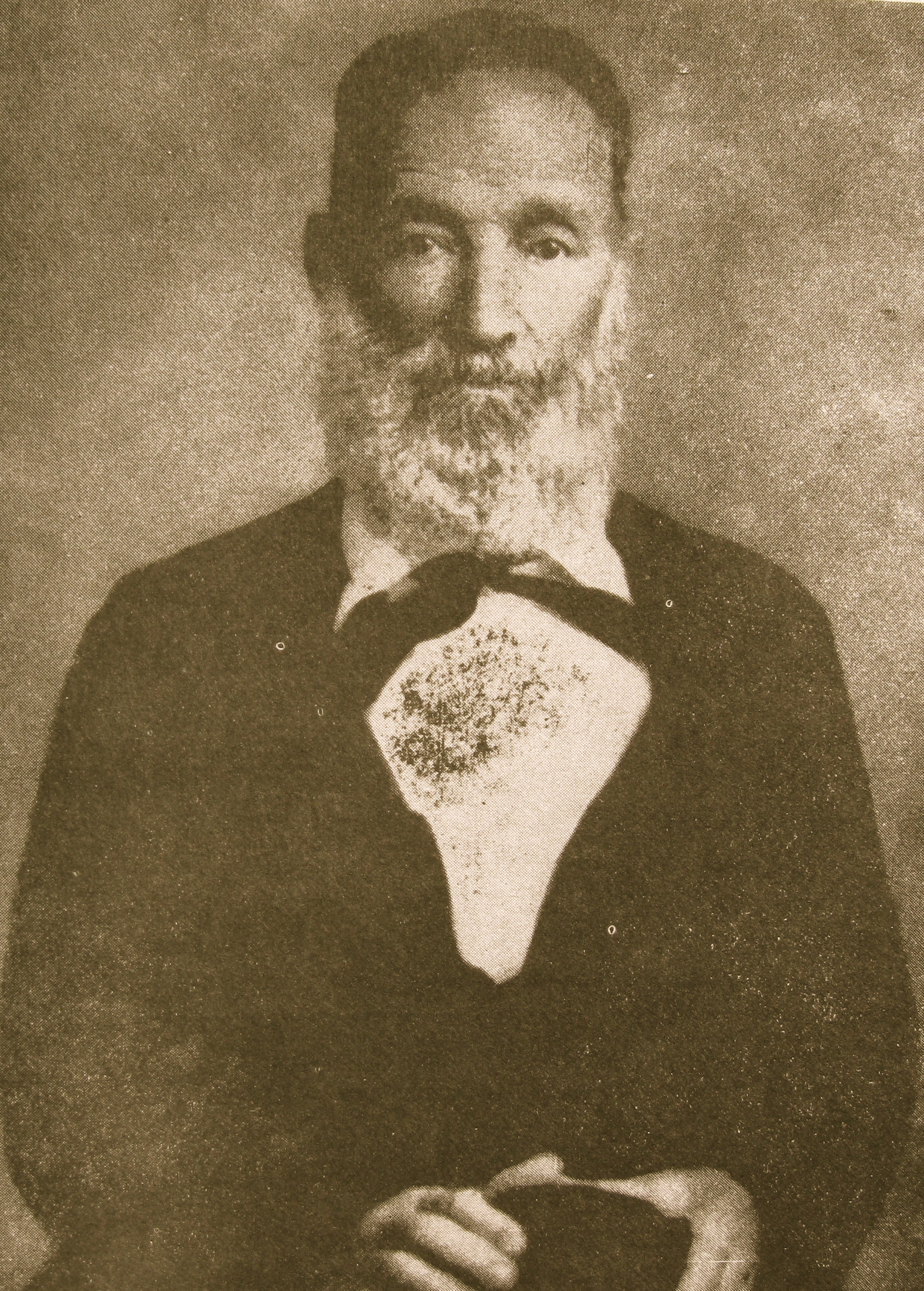
- Robert Sayers Sheffey, c. 1880
- Born: July 4, 1820; Ivanhoe, Virginia, United States
- Died: August 30, 1902 (aged 82); White Gate, Virginia, United States
- Occupation: Evangelist
- Spouses: Elizabeth Zwecker; Elizabeth “Eliza” Stafford
- Relatives: Hugh White Sheffey (brother); Daniel Sheffey (uncle)

Robert Sayers Sheffey (July 4, 1820 – August 30, 1902) was an American Methodist evangelist and circuit-rider, renowned for his eccentricities and power in prayer, who ministered to, and became part of the folklore of, the Appalachian region of southwest Virginia, southern West Virginia and eastern Tennessee.

== Biography ==
=== Youth and conversion ===
Sheffey was born near the hamlet of Ivanhoe, Wythe County, Virginia, of a locally prominent family, the youngest of five brothers. His mother died when he was two, and he was reared by an aunt in Abingdon, Virginia. Sheffey attended Emory and Henry College in 1839–40, but “his early dislike for books and an aversion for profound study” did not augur well for higher education.

Sheffey was eighteen when he was converted at a revival in Abingdon. Although his relatives wished him to continue in the Presbyterian church, he became a Methodist and, shortly thereafter, an itinerant preacher.

=== Marriages and family ===
In 1843, Sheffey married Elizabeth Frances Swecker (1817-1854), and they had six children. Sheffey farmed, taught school, served as a clerk, and kept a store. After the death of his first wife in 1854, he became completely committed to his ministry, and legends began to grow about his “peculiarities, idiosyncrasies, his pet hobbies, and his odd whimsical notions.” For several years he attempted to obtain a license to preach but because of his oddities did not succeed until 1855. Yet eventually his circuit of Methodist churches spanned fourteen mountain counties in Virginia and West Virginia and included regular appearances at the popular Wabash Camp Meetings near Staffordsville, Giles County, Virginia.

In January 1864 Sheffey married Elizabeth “Eliza” Stafford, although her parents did not favor the marriage because of Sheffey's constant circuit riding. Nevertheless, the marriage was a success. Eliza understood her husband and did not complain about his frequent absences. The couple had one son, Edward Fleming Sheffey (1865–1933), who became a successful Lynchburg businessman. He remembered as a boy telling his father, “Uncle Johnny thinks that you ought to spend more time with your family,” to which Sheffey replied, “Son, Uncle Johnny doesn't know which way the rats run. The Lord will take care of you.” Eventually even the Staffords were reconciled to the marriage.

=== "St. Francis of the wilderness" ===
Called a “St. Francis of the wilderness,” Sheffey was renowned for his concern about the welfare of animals. He once dismounted to collect tadpoles in his handkerchief so that he could transfer them to a stream from a small pool where they were certain to die. Others he tried to save by bringing water to their mud hole. Sheffey regularly stopped to right beetles and dropped out of funeral processions to lift insects out of the way of wagon wheels. He gave his lunch to hungry dogs and tried (unsuccessfully) to “relieve” flies caught on sticky paper. Once when his brother-in-law cut a wasp in two with a pair of scissors, Sheffey went out to the yard and starting praying. When the brother-in-law asked why, he replied, “I am praying for the Lord to make another wasp to take the place of the one you killed.” Sheffey was especially solicitous of his horse. He specifically instructed hosts how to water and feed his horse, and he often dismounted rather than make the horse carry him up a steep grade. Sheffey had a sweet tooth and would often fill his mouth with sugar, honey, or maple syrup. He regularly prayed, “Lord, bless the little honeybees for they make sweet honey. Like sweet Jesus.”

He was as solicitous of the welfare of men as of animals. On a number of occasions he gave away woolen socks to those who were in need, sometimes giving away a new knitted pair, sometimes taking the socks off his own feet. Once on a cold day riding the trail, he met a stranger with no coat and gave away his own. He even once gave away his horse to replace an animal that had died pulling a heavily loaded covered wagon. After being beaten by some young toughs after a meeting, Sheffey tried hard not to testify against them in court, and when they were convicted, with tears he pleaded with the judge to allow them to go unpunished because he had forgiven them.

Sheffey enjoyed singing and shouting and would often draw pictures of birds and fish or write snatches of hymns on the walls of his hosts’ homes or on rock outcroppings, sometimes in artistic lettering. One story claims that after having written “What shall I do to be saved?” on a large rock, he discovered that a patent medicine salesman had written underneath, “Use Hite's Pain Cure.” Sheffey then added, “And prepare to meet thy God.” Sheffey's peculiar sense of humor is also evident in a story about a child bitten by a rattlesnake. Called in to pray for the child, Sheffey is said to have petitioned, “O Lord, we do thank Thee for rattlesnakes. If it had not been for a rattlesnake they would never have called upon You. Send a rattlesnake to bite Bill, and one to bite John, and send a great big one to bite the old man.”

Even stranger to mountain folk was Sheffey's insistence on cleanliness. If his towels or bedding were dirty, he would let his host know. He might even ask his hostess for a white counterpane. He would pour a small amount of coffee into his saucer, wash the edges where the fingers of his hostess had touched it, and then throw the liquid out the door or into the fire. He assured his son that “plenty of water inside and out” was the “best thing for anybody.”

=== Power in prayer ===
Many stories about Sheffey related to his power in prayer. Some of his prayers concerned critical needs of agricultural communities, such as the need for rain in time of drought or the prevention of rain during harvest. Because Sheffey hated the liquor traffic, his most remembered prayers were directed against stills and the people who ran them. According to an expert in the folklore of itinerant Methodist preachers, there are "at least twenty-five accounts of how Sheffey's prayers led to the immediate destruction of whiskey stills and distilleries," many apparently versions of the same episode. (The owners were not moonshiners; at the time, private distilling was perfectly legal.) According to one minister, Sheffey prayed for the destruction of three distilleries on a creek near where they had been preaching. The minister claimed the proprietor of one still, in robust health, died suddenly; at a second, Sheffey prayed that a tree would fall on the still house though there were no trees nearby, and a “great storm came and actually landed a tree on the still”; and a third still was destroyed by fire after Sheffey had spent a night in prayer against it. Men were said to have left the area rather than become the object of Sheffey's prayers.

Sheffey's contemporaries agreed that although “he was the most powerful man in prayer…he couldn't preach a lick.” He would take a text and never return to it, and his preaching consisted largely of relating personal experiences. Nevertheless, as the Methodist preacher George C. Rankin recalled in his memoirs, although Sheffey “acted more like a crazy man than otherwise,” he “was wonderful in a meeting. He would stir the people, crowd the mourner's bench with crying penitents and have genuine conversions by the score.”

=== Final years ===
Eliza Sheffey died in September 1896. Sheffey continued his ministry as he was physically able, but he eventually suffered intensely from rheumatism. Invited by his son to join him in Lynchburg, Sheffey preferred to stay away from cities and remain in rural Giles County. He died at the home of a friend, Aurelius Vest, a farmer, coffin builder, and country undertaker, near White Gate on August 30, 1902. He is buried in Wesley Chapel Cemetery (off Sheffey Memorial Road) in Trigg. On his monument are the words, "The poor were sorry when he died."

== The Sheffey legend ==
After Sheffey's death, his son, Edward, expressed an interest in writing (or in having written) a biography of his father. However, Edward died before any work was done. In 1935, Willard Sanders Barbery, a Methodist minister in Bluefield, Virginia compiled a book of stories he had collected about Sheffey, which a scholar of religion has called an unusual work "published in orthodoxy's hinterlands which gives full play to the tenets of folk religion," a pseudo-biography based on oral sources that indicate "the tenacity of the folk memory as well as its appropriation of what orthodoxy would regard as unedifying if not heretical."

In 1974, Jess Carr (1930–1990), published a “biographical novel," a project, he said, that had partially been inspired by seeing what he assumed was a funeral being conducted in the Wesley Chapel Cemetery but which a local storekeeper assured him was regular visitation to Sheffey's grave, “all the time, year-round.” A Virginia state historical marker has been placed near the grave, and in 1979 a Sheffey Memorial Camp Meeting was organized that met annually in Trigg into the 21st century. In 1977, Unusual Films, the cinema division of Bob Jones University, released a feature-length film, Sheffey, with a script based on Carr's novel.
