= John W. Green (Virginia politician) =

American judge (1781–1834)

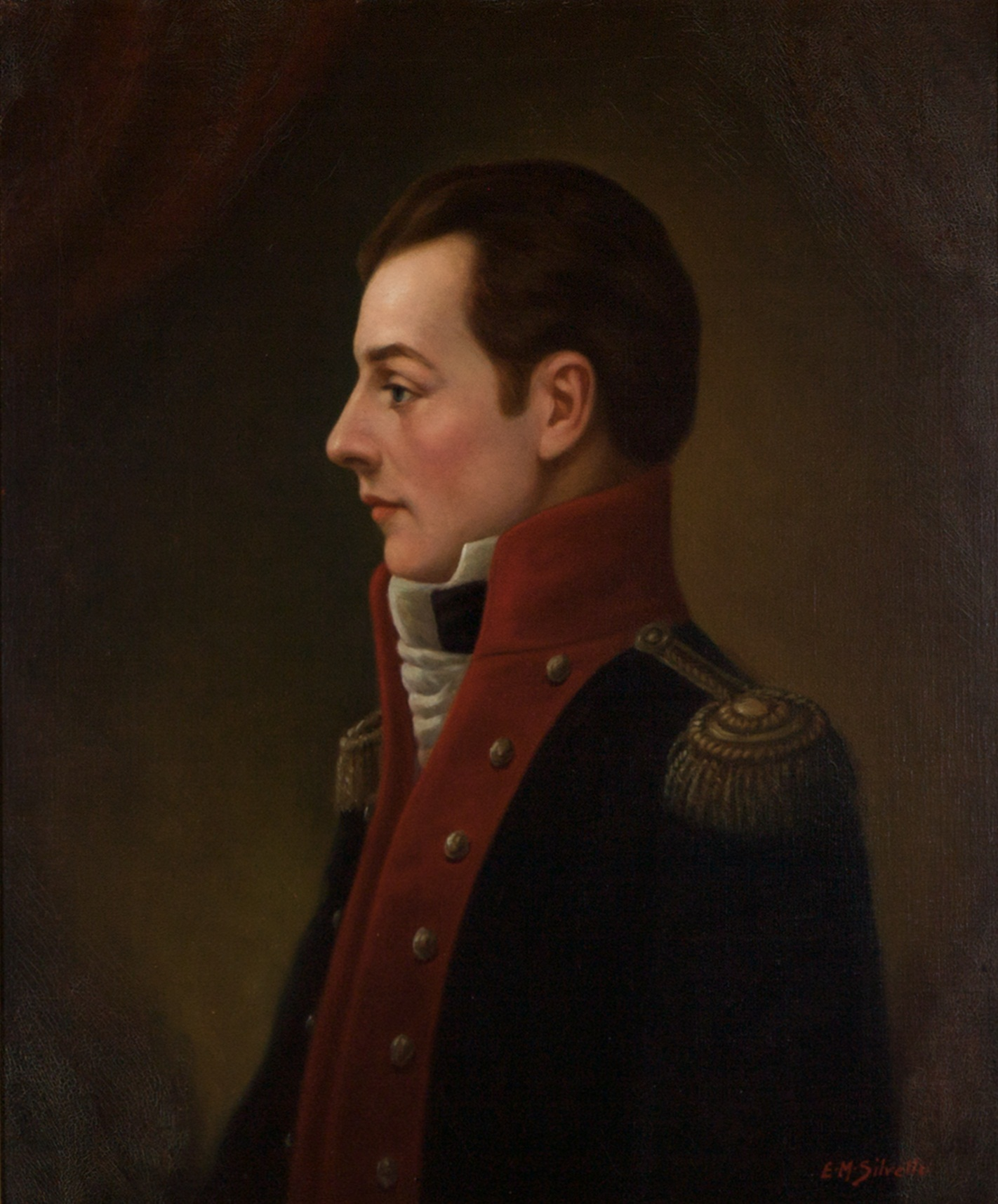
- Posthumous portrait, c. 1939

Judge on the Virginia Supreme Court of Appeals
- In office October 11, 1822 – February 5, 1834
- In office December 4, 1815 – 1819

Member of the Virginia State Senate representing Spotsylvania, Orange, Culpeper and Madison Counties
- Preceded by: Robert Taylor
- Succeeded by: Robert Mallory

Personal details
- Born: November 9, 1781 Culpeper County, Virginia, United States
- Died: February 4, 1834 (aged 52)
- Resting place: Fairview Cemetery
- Spouse(s): Mary Brown, Million Cooke
- Profession: Law

Military service
- Allegiance: United States
- Rank: Lieutenant
- Battles/wars: War of 1812

John Williams Green (November 9, 1781 – February 4, 1834) was a Virginia lawyer, soldier, plantation owner, politician and judge. He fought in the War of 1812, was elected to the Virginia State Senate, and served for more than ten years as a judge on the Virginia Supreme Court of Appeals.

== Early life and family ==
Born in Culpeper County, Virginia, Green was the only son of William Green and Lucy Williams. His grandfather Colonel John Green fought in the American Revolutionary War. John W. Green was educated as a lawyer. Although he was 31 years old, Green volunteered to fight in the War of 1812, serving as a lieutenant in that conflict.

He married twice, first to Mary Brown in 1805 and second to Million Cooke (1785–1842, granddaughter of George Mason) in 1817.

== Political and judicial career ==
Green served in the Virginia State Senate from 1815 to 1819, representing Culpeper County and neighboring Spotsylvania, Orange and Madison Counties. He also served as a delegate to the Virginia Constitutional Convention of 1829-1830. In 1830, Judge Green's household consisted of seven white males (four of them boys), three white females (one a girl) and 42 slaves (28 males and 14 females).

Green resigned his part-time senate seat in 1819 upon being elected to the Court of Chancery. Three years later, the legislature elected Green as a judge of the Virginia Supreme Court of Appeals. Green held that position for over ten years, but poor health prevented him from attending sessions of the court during the last two years of his life. As a result, the Virginia General Assembly began considering removing Judge Green from office, before his death on February 4, 1834, made those considerations moot.
