= William P. Taylor =

American politician (1790–1863)

William Penn Taylor (October 25, 1790 – June 18, 1863) was a nineteenth-century congressman from Virginia.

== Early life ==
Born in Fredericksburg, Virginia, October 25, 1790, the son of Congressman John Taylor. William Taylor received a limited schooling as a child.

== Career ==
He held several local political offices in Caroline County, Virginia, including as a delegate to the Virginia Constitutional Convention of 1829-1830 where he served alongside Robert B. Taylor from Norfolk, a Brigadier General in the state militia.

Taylor was elected to the Virginia House of Delegates for the session 1830/31 from Caroline County, Virginia.

He was elected an Anti-Jacksonian to the United States House of Representatives in 1832, serving from 1833 to 1835 and being unsuccessful for reelection.

He was an unsuccessful Democratic candidate for governor of Virginia in 1842. In 1845, Taylor served as a presidential elector.

== Death ==
He died at his estate called "Hayfield" in Caroline County, Virginia June 18, 1863, and was interred in the family cemetery on the estate.

== Bibliography ==
- "Biographical Directory of the United States Congress, 1774 - Present". bioguide.congress.gov. United States Congress. Archived from the original on April 23, 2010.
- Pulliam, David Loyd (1901). The Constitutional Conventions of Virginia from the foundation of the Commonwealth to the present time. John T. West, Richmond. ISBN 978-1-2879-2059-5.
- Swem, Earl Greg (1918). A Register of the General Assembly of Virginia, 1776-1918, and of the Constitutional Conventions. David Bottom, Superintendent of Public Printing. ISBN 978-1-3714-6242-0.
- United States Congress. "William P. Taylor (id: T000105)". Biographical Directory of the United States Congress.

U.S. House of Representatives
Preceded by Andrew Stevenson	Member of the U.S. House of Representatives from Virginia's 9th congressional district March 4, 1833 – March 3, 1835	Succeeded by John Roane
