= John B. Clopton =

American politician

Member of the Virginia Senate from the Charles City, Elizabeth City, Henrico, James City, New Kent, Warwick and York Counties and Williamsburg. district

Delegate, state Senator, Judge
- In office December 1821 – 1832

Personal details
- Born: February 12, 1789 Richmond, Virginia, U.S.
- Died: March 20, 1860 (aged 71) Old Point Comfort, Elizabeth City County, Virginia, U.S.
- Education: College of William and Mary
- Occupation: Lawyer, judge, politician

John Bacon Clopton (February 12, 1789 – March 20, 1860) was a nineteenth-century American politician and jurist from Virginia.

== Early life and education ==
Clopton was born in Richmond, his state's capital city, the son of the former Sarah Bacon and her husband, planter and politician John Clopton. He was raised at his father's plantation, "Roslin" in nearby New Kent County. His father served in the U.S. House of Representatives as well as on Virginia's Council of State during his youth. His family included another brother and at least two sisters. He was tutored at home, as befit his class, and later attended the College of William and Mary in Williamsburg. Then he read law in Richmond with Edmund Randolph.

== Career ==
Clopton received a license to practice law in Virginia during May, 1810, and in that year also mounted his first political campaign. However, New Kent County voters rejected his attempt to secure a (part-time) position in the Virginia House of Delegates.

During the War of 1812, Clopton served in Virginia's militia, as sergeant of the New Kent County infantry, which was called into service from June 28 until July 13, 1813, as British ships menaced the county.

On September 11 or 12th, 1816, his father, who had suffered from poor health for many years, died in his tenth term as a Congressman but at the family home, Roslin in New Kent County. John Clopton had considered not running for that tenth term, but probably hoped that this son would succeed him. However, in the November special election to fill the vacant seat, J.B. Clopton lost a three-man race to future president John Tyler. Clopton did not run in the regular election for that congressional seat the following spring.

The Virginia Capitol at Richmond VA where 19th century Conventions met

In December 1821, Clopton won his first election by a narrow margin, this time in a special election to fill a vacant seat in the Virginia senate representing the cities of Richmond and Williamsburg, as well as Charles City County, Elizabeth City County, Henrico County, James City County, New Kent County, Warwick County and York County. Voters also re-elected Clopton, who thus served for two four-year terms.

After his mother's death in 1824, Clopton was embroiled in litigation with his two sisters concerning the distribution of slaves as well as stock dividends from their parents' estates. By 1829 Clopton owned 613 acres of land in New Kent County, as well as twenty enslaved people aged twelve or older. However, his residence changed several times, because of his duties in the state capital, from Manchester (then across the James River from Richmond, but how a neighborhood of the city) to Henrico County, to Williamsburg. Clopton also owned a fourteen-room mansion near Old Point Comfort in Elizabeth City County.

In 1829, voters in a district similar to his senatorial district chose Clopton as one of their delegates to the Virginia Constitutional Convention of 1829-1830. Fellow Virginia lawyers John Marshall, John Tyler, and Philip N. Nicholas also represented that partially Tidewater district. During that Convention, which discussed slavery as well as the under-representation of western Virginia, Clopton served on the Bill of Rights Committee that considered matters not referred to the Legislative, Executive or Judicial Committees. Clopton proposed an amendment (which was adopted) which described the Council of State as advisory and reducing its membership from eight men to three men, as well as designating the senior member as lieutenant governor and fixing their terms of service. Fellow delegate Hugh Blair Grigsby described Clopton as "a reformer in every vein and artery of his system", but Clopton considered his duty to represent his conservative constituency. He chaired the three man select committee that put together the draft that the convention adopted on January 14, 1830.

Following that convention, and the expiration of his second senatorial term, Clopton contemplated withdrawing from public life, but fellow legislators elected him in February 1834 as judge for the Seventh Judicial Circuit, consisting of Chesterfield, Goochland, Hanover, Henrico and Powhatan Counties around Richmond. However, when Richmond was severed from Henrico County and became a city in its own right in February 1837, a state auditor reduced Judge Clopton's salary by $300. Clopton contested this administrative fiat, and won a favorable ruling by the Virginia Supreme Court restoring his salary to $1800/yr. As judge, Clopton adjudicated civil and criminal cases, including the sensational murder trial of Thomas Richie who had killed Whig newspaper editor (and antislavery advocate) John Hampden Pleasants in a duel. In 1852, following another constitutional convention, a new constitution made judges elective. Clopton then was elected judge of the Sixth Judicial Circuit, similar to his original senatorial district, consisting of the City of Williamsburg and Charles City, Elizabeth City, Gloucester, Hnrico, James City, Mathews Middlesex, New Kent, Warwich and York counties. Judge Clopton continued to serve in this district from January 1, 1855, until his death in 1860.

He was corresponding secretary of the Virginia Historical Society alongside Hugh Blair Grigsby, who also served in the 1830 Constitutional Convention.

== Personal life ==
On May 4, 1820, Clopton married Maria Gaitskell Foster, daughter of a former Richmond mayor and who had been educated at a Moravian female seminary in Pennsylvania. They had five sons and seven daughters, but four children died as infants or in early childhood.

== Death ==
John B. Clopton died from effects of gout on March 20, 1860, at his residence near Old Point Comfort. He was buried in a family cemetery near Richmond. During the Civil War following his death, his widow chaired a ladies' defense committee that raised funds for Confederate soldiers, and opened her home to nurse wounded soldiers. Duke University maintains the Clopton family papers.
