= Peachy Harrison =

American politician

- Born: 1777; Rockingham County, Virginia, U.S.
- Died: 1848 (aged 70–71); Harrisonburg, Virginia, U.S.
- Education: Benjamin Rush's Medical School
- Occupations: Doctor, politician
- Title: Doctor, Sheriff, Delegate, state Senator

Peachy Harrison (1777–1848) was a nineteenth-century medical doctor and American politician who served in both houses of the Virginia General Assembly, and was a delegate to the Virginia Constitutional Convention. He also served as Rockingham County Sheriff.

== Early life ==
Harrison was born in Rockingham County, the son of Colonel Benjamin Harrison of Augusta County, his father's plantation was at present Dayton, Virginia, and Peachy attended Fisher's Spring School. He completed his education graduating from the medical school conducted by Dr. Benjamin Rush in Philadelphia.

== Career ==
The Virginia Capitol at Richmond VA where 19th century Conventions met

As an adult, Harrison lived and practiced medicine in Harrisonburg. He was elected Sheriff of Rockingham County 1824–1826, and then served in the Virginia House of Delegates. By the time he was elected as a Virginia State Senator, he had become his party's leader in the Rockingham County region of the Valley.

Harrison was elected as a delegate to the Virginia Constitutional Convention of 1829–1830. There he was elected by the Convention to serve on the Judicial Committee. He was one of four delegates elected from the senatorial district made up of Shenandoah and Rockingham Counties.

== Death ==
Peachy Harrison died in the spring of 1848 at Harrisonburg, Virginia.

Harrison's children included the classicist and University of Virginia professor Gessner Harrison.

== Bibliography ==
- Harrison, John Houston (1935). Settlers by the long Grey Trail: some pioneers to old Augusta County, Virginia, and their descendants. Genealogical Publishing Company. ISBN 978-0-8063-0664-3.
- Pulliam, David Loyd (1901). The Constitutional Conventions of Virginia from the foundation of the Commonwealth to the present time. John T. West, Richmond. ISBN 978-1-2879-2059-5.
