= John Munford Gregory =

American politician

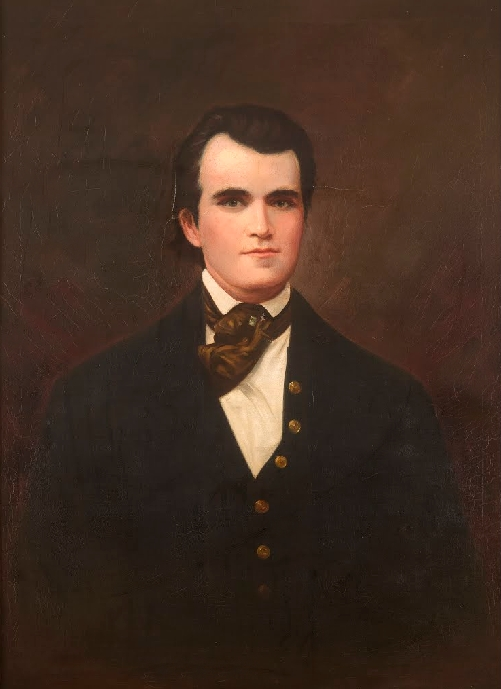

Acting Governor of Virginia
- In office March 31, 1842 – January 1, 1843
- Preceded by: John Rutherfoord
- Succeeded by: James McDowell

Member of the Virginia House of Delegates for James City, York, and Williamsburg
- In office December 3, 1832 – December 6, 1841
- Preceded by: Robert Sheild
- Succeeded by: Lemuel J. Bowden

Personal details
- Born: July 8, 1804 Charles City County, Virginia
- Died: April 9, 1884 (aged 79) Richmond, Virginia
- Party: Whig
- Spouse: Amanda Wallace
- Education: College of William and Mary
- Profession: Lawyer, politician

John Munford Gregory (July 8, 1804 – April 9, 1884) was a U.S. political figure and acting governor of Virginia in 1842-43.

== Biography ==
Gregory was born in Virginia on July 8, 1804, and was a member of the Virginia House of Delegates from 1831 to 1840. He served as acting Governor of Virginia in 1842-43 and then as a state court judge. Gregory died on April 9, 1884, and was buried at Shockoe Hill Cemetery in Richmond, Virginia. One of the men that Gregory enslaved, John Dunjee, escaped and became a prominent Baptist preacher.

His home in Richmond after 1849, the Benjamin Watkins Leigh House, was listed on the National Register of Historic Places in 1969.

Political offices
Preceded by John Rutherfoord; Acting Governor	Acting Governor of Virginia; 1842–1843	Succeeded by James McDowell; Governor
