= Chapman Johnson =

American politician

Member of the Virginia House of Delegates from the Richmond City district
- In office 1835–1836
- Preceded by: John Rutherfoord
- Succeeded by: Robert Stanard

Member of the Virginia Senate from the Augusta, Rockbridge and Pendleton Counties district
- In office December 6, 1819 – December 3, 1826
- Preceded by: district reorganized
- Succeeded by: David W. Patteson

Member of the Virginia Senate from the Augusta, Rockingham, Rockbridge, Shenandoah, Pendleton and Bath Counties district
- In office December 3, 1804 – December 5, 1819
- Preceded by: Freeman Epes
- Succeeded by: district reorganized

Personal details
- Born: March 12, 1779 Louisa County, Virginia, U.S.
- Died: 1849 (aged 69–70) Richmond, Virginia, U.S.
- Party: Democratic
- Spouse: Mary Ann Nicholson
- Education: College of William and Mary
- Occupation: Lawyer, politician

Military service
- Allegiance: United States of America
- Branch/service: Virginia militia
- Years of service: War of 1812
- Rank: captain

Chapman Johnson (March 12, 1779 – July 12, 1849) was a nineteenth-century Virginia lawyer, military officer, politician and educator, who served in the War of 1812 and more than two decades in the Virginia Senate representing Augusta County and neighboring areas which he also represented in the Virginia Constitutional Convention of 1829-1830, after which he served probably one term in the Virginia House of Delegates representing Richmond, and later became rector of the University of Virginia (1836-1845).

== Early life ==
Johnson was born in Louisa County during the American Revolutionary War, to Thomas Johnson (1744-circa 1795) and his wife Jane Chapman. They were associated with Boswell's Tavern, built by Thomas's father Nicholas Johnson (this man's grandfather) but operated by his son-in-law (this man's brother in law) John Boswell until Boswell died in 1788.

Complicating matters, Louisa County had two and possibly three men named Thomas Johnson who supported the Revolutionary cause, two of whom served on the county's very active Committee of Safety. One (called the "Major") served several terms in the House of Burgesses (incl. 1758) and was the grandson of Richard Johnson, a merchant who emigrated from England as an agent for the English Jeffreys firm and who sat on the Governor's Council at the beginning of the 18th century, and whose son Thomas Johnson (Sr.) was a burgess representing King William County in Tidewater Virginia. That Thomas Johnson Sr. continued the family's merchant trade alongside his brother William (their eldest brother Richard dying without marrying) but ultimately sold the family plantation Chericoke to Chapman. Another Louisa important patriot Thomas Johnson was this man's father (sometimes called Thomas Johnson (the "Minor")). In any event, his mother Jane Chapman came from King William County (hence his first name and the middle name of his second eldest brother Richard Chapman Johnson, who administered their father's estate). Thomas Johnson the Minor's will was admitted to probate in Louisa County in October 1795, and in addition to freeing some slaves and bequeathing others, named his children as John Boswell Johnson, Richard Chapman Johnson, Thomas Meriwether Johnson, Chapman Johnson (this man), William Johnson, Jane Johnson and Ann Johnson. Another Louisa County man of the same name who died nearly a decade later, Thomas Johnson (1836-1803), served as captain in the Virginia Line during American Revolutionary War (from 1776 to 1779 defending the arsenal at the relatively nearby Point of Fork, 1776–1779 as well as serving under General Muhlenberg). That revolutionary officer married his second cousin Elizabeth Meriwether, and his heirs received land grants in the west in 1838. Further complicating matters, this man's eldest brother, John Boswell Johnson (1771-1815), also named one of his sons Chapman Johnson (whom this man mentored after his brother's death, as related below, but whom later moved to Tennessee).

His mother died when Chapman was young and his father managed the tavern to support his young family, despite what some warned would be the clientele's deleterious effects upon the young boys and girls. The family could only afford to send the eldest brother for higher education (at the College of William & Mary in Williamsburg), but Chapman impressed Rev. Peter Nelson (who operated a local school) and Patrick Michie (a neighbor who had attended college as well as spent some time in South Carolina before returning to Louisa county). All sources agree that this Chapman Johnson traveled to Williamsburg in 1801, and studied at the College of William and Mary in an accelerated program, including morality under bishop Madison and law under St. George Tucker, and received a degree in 1802.

== Career ==
The Virginia Capitol at Richmond VA where 19th century Conventions met

After graduation and being admitted to the Virginia bar in Richmond, upon the recommendation of Judge William Wirt, Chapman Johnson moved to Staunton, the county seat of Augusta County, Virginia and gateway to both the state's Shenandoah Valley and Appalachian regions. Initially, he found building a successful practice difficult and contemplated moving further west to Kentucky, but John Coalter urged him to persist, and in 1805 Johnson was admitted to Virginia's appellate bar as well. Several distinguished merchants also moved to Staunton between 1800 and 1812, as did fellow lawyers Briscoe G. Baldwin from Frederick County and John Howe Peyton from Stafford County. There, in addition to his legal practice, Johnson operated a plantation called "Bearwallow".

Johnson became involved in politics by delivering a speech lauding the Louisiana Purchase circa 1805, which was published and distributed widely. Staunton voters elected Johnson their mayor in 1808 and again in 1811. He also served (part-time) more than two decades in the Virginia state Senate (1804 through 1826) from a district made up of Augusta, Rockbridge and Pendleton Counties (also including until 1819 Rockingham and Bath Counties).

In the summer of 1813, during the War of 1812, Johnson recruited 54 men from in and around Staunton (40 of them mounted) and proceeded to Richmond. On July 9, as their captain he volunteered their services, but was told they were not needed, so the men returned home. Nonetheless, Johnson served as an aide-de-camp to General James Breckinridge. Fellow Staunton lawyer John Howe Peyton held a similar position on the staff of General Robert Porterfield.

This Chapman Johnson corresponded a great deal with Thomas Jefferson, particular after the President's retirement, Joseph C. Cabell having recommended him. Johnson served on the Board of Trustees of the University of Virginia from 1819 to 1845, and served as the University's rector from 1836 to 1845.

Although this Chapman Johnson spent considerable time in Richmond (including helping family members during the theater fire of December 1811) and moved to state capital in 1824, he continued to keep a summer home near Staunton.

He had long sought increased representation in the state senate for western Virginians, having advocated a constitutional convention as early as 1816 after Staunton residents demanded it in a meeting. The existing regime made the eastern slave-holding counties (particularly the plantations of the Tidewater area) a permanent majority in the General Assembly, opposing direct election of the Governor as well as internal improvements to connect the western regions to markets in the eastern region and even overseas. Thus, despite or because Johnson primarily lived in Richmond, Western Virginians from Augusta, Rockbridge and Pendleton Counties elected him as one of their four delegates to the Virginia Constitutional Convention of 1829-1830, held in Richmond. Fellow delegates elected him to serve on the Legislative Committee. During that Convention, Johnson proved one of the western leaders, although more conservative concerning property rights qualifications of voters than Congressman Philip Doddridge. His friend and fellow Richmond lawyer (and soon to become U.S. Senator) Benjamin W. Leigh was Johnson's counterpart for the conservative party. The White Basis Party sought reapportionment of the state legislature to represent citizens only, without weighting the legislature by counting slaves held as property, but Johnson was one of the Westerners voting against it (although that which would have made the state legislature 46% westerners). Johnson he was among those voting for another compromise that allowed the West 41% of the legislature, albeit at the price of allowing no amendment process (which led to another state constitutional convention in 1850, shortly after his death).

Complicating matters, the century-old biographies indicate only his legislative service in the state senate and that convention (one noting that since he was not wealthy and depended on his legal practice for this livelihood, such preparation must have cost Johnson considerable legal income needed to support his growing family). Following the convention, Richmond City voters elected Chapman Johnson as their representative to the Virginia House of Delegates in 1834-1835, replacing his neighbor and multi-term delegate John Rutherfoord, and being replaced the next year by future appellate judge Robert Stanard. This man's nephew, nicknamed "Chap", the son of an older brother who died and who this man helped educate at the University of Virginia with one of his sons in 1835, represented Augusta County in the House of Delegates alongside Hugh Sheffey from 1846 to 1848.

== Personal life ==
This Chapman Johnson married the orphan Mary Ann Nicholson (1788-1859) in Henrico County outside Richmond in 1806. Her father, George Nicholson, had been a prominent merchant in Williamsburg, twice served as its mayor, and had three daughters with two successive Virginia wives. He moved to Richmond where he operated a rope-manufacturing company with two partners. However, he never returned from a trip to Madiera in May 1802, and was presumed lost at sea. His brother Thomas Nicholson became his executor, and litigation resulted by 1808. Her parents had married in Virginia Beach in 1783.

This Chapman Johnson and his wife had several children, the eldest being George Johnson (d. 1855), who became a lawyer and accompanied his father on many visits to Bearwallow, White Sulfur Springs and other health spas, particularly after this man experienced many medical issues after 1839. However, Johnson was not descended from the First Families of Virginia, and only his daughter and youngest sons remained in Staunton after the Civil War (the youngest, Carter Page Johnson married Ann Love and moved to Washington D.C. and named their son born in 1855 Chapman Johnson).

== Death ==
Chapman Johnson died July 12, 1849, at Richmond, Virginia, and was buried at historic Shockoe Hill Cemetery. Although the accompanying acreage continues to decrease, the house constructed at Bear Wallow Farm in 1845 (1926 Spring Hill Road) (i.e. after his death), still exists and was restored in modern times (and sold in the last decade).

== See also ==
- List of mayors of Staunton, Virginia
