= John Rutherfoord =

American politician (1792–1866)

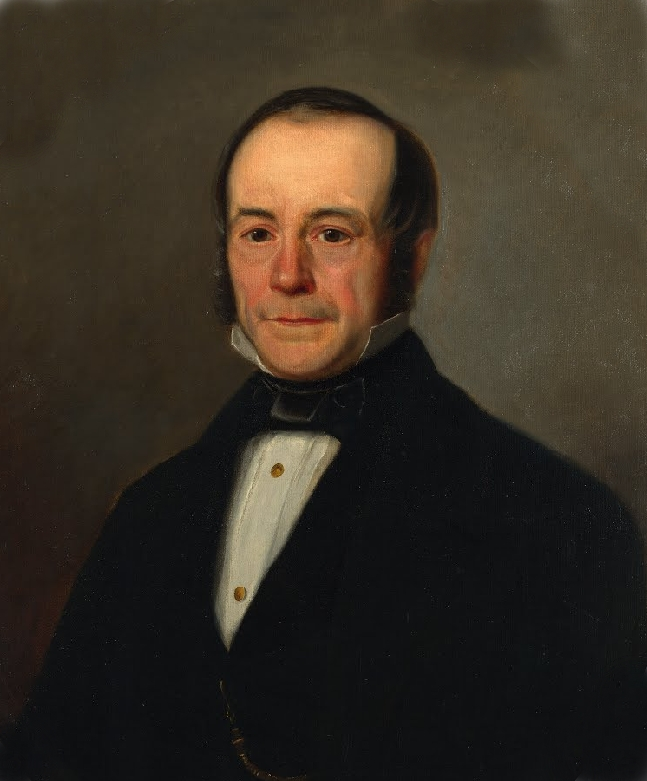

Acting Governor of Virginia
- In office March 31, 1841 – March 31, 1842
- Preceded by: John M. Patton
- Succeeded by: John Munford Gregory

Member of the Virginia House of Delegates from Richmond City
- In office December 4, 1826 – December 1, 1834
- Preceded by: Jacqueline B. Harvie
- Succeeded by: Chapman Johnson

Personal details
- Born: John Rutherfoord; December 6, 1792 Richmond, Virginia, U.S.
- Died: August 3, 1866 (aged 73) Richmond, Virginia, U.S.
- Party: Democratic
- Spouse: Ann Coles
- Children: at least 6 including John Coles Rutherford
- Relatives: Edward Coles (brother in law)
- Education: Princeton University

John Rutherfoord (December 6, 1792 – August 3, 1866) was a Virginia businessman, politician and military officer. He served as Acting Governor of Virginia between 1841 and 1842.

== Early life and education ==
Rutherfoord was born in Richmond, Virginia's state capital, in 1792. His father was Thomas Rutherfoord (1766-1852), a Scottish merchant who emigrated to the colony and also wrote political tracts. Sources differ as to whether his mother was Sarah Winston or Sarah Jordan. He received a private education appropriate to his class, then traveled to New Jersey for further studies, graduating from Princeton University in 1816. He then studied law.

== Career ==
Although admitted to the bar, Rutherfoord only practiced law for a short time. He was associated with the Mutual Assurance Society, Virginia's first insurance company, becoming its president in 1836 and serving for three decades until his death.

As was required of all white men of his time, Rutherfoord also served in a militia unit. He was an officer of the Richmond Fayette Artillery, advancing through the ranks from captain to regimental commander with the rank of colonel.

Originally a Democratic-Republican until 1833, Rutherfoord then aligned with the Whig until 1837. Because of his views on sub-treasuries, Rutherfoord then became a Democrat. Richmond City voters elected him as their representative in the Virginia House of Delegates in 1826, and re-elected him many times, so he served from December 1826 to March 1834. Legislators then elected Rutherfoord as a member of the state Executive Council, and he served from 1839 to 1841.

In 1841 Governor Thomas Walker Gilmer resigned to accept election to a seat in the United States House of Representatives. His place was taken by John M. Patton, who was first in the line of succession as the Executive Council's senior member. Patton served just 12 days before he resigned. As the senior member of the Executive Council, Rutherfoord then succeeded to the governorship. He served one year, from March 31, 1841, to March 31, 1842. Rutherfoord continued Governor Gilmer's dispute with New York governor Seward. Upon his resignation, he was succeeded by another Executive Council member, John Munford Gregory, who completed the term to which Gilmer had been elected.

== Personal life ==
In 1816 he married Emily Ann Coles in Albemarle County, Virginia. Her father, John Coles, operated Enniscorthy plantation in Albemarle County, and one of her brothers, Edward Coles, would become secretary to U.S. Presidents as well as governor of Illinois before settling in Philadelphia where he became a historian and prominent abolitionist. Although their son Thomas died as an infant, several other children reached adulthood and married, including sons Alexander, Samuel and John Coles Rutherfoord (who continued his father's traditions by becoming as lawyer and politician as well as planter, serving in the Virginia House of Delegates representing Goochland County). Daughters who reached adulthood included Emily Rutherford Aylett and her sisters Helen and Rebecca who did not marry. By 1850, his wife was Mary and they lived with their daughter Emily. Their Richmond household also included merchant William Palmer and his wife Elizabeth and their daughter Sally.

Rutherfoord owned 7 slaves in Richmond in 1820. Two decades later (in 1840) he owned 9 slaves in Richmond. In the first census separately enumerating slaves, in 1850, Rutherfoord owned 7 slaves in Richmond, and his son John C. Rutherfoord owned 24 slaves in nearby Goochland County, and Samuel J Rutherfoord owned seven slaves in Henrico County's western District. In 1860, Rutherfoord owned 9 slaves in Richmond,

== Later life and death ==
After resigning from the governorship, Rutherfoord returned to his business interests. He received a pardon for his wartime activities in 1865 and died in Richmond on August 3, 1866. He is buried in Richmond's Shockoe Hill Cemetery. His papers are held by the state archives at the Library of Virginia.

Political offices
Preceded by John M. Patton; Acting Governor	Acting Governor of Virginia; 1841–1842	Succeeded by John Munford Gregory; Acting Governor
