= Lewis Summers =

American politician

- Born: November 7, 1778; Fairfax County, Virginia, U.S.
- Died: 1843 (aged 64–65); Greenbrier, West Virginia, U.S.
- Occupation: Lawyer
- Title: Delegate, Judge
- Political party: Whig

Lewis Summers (November 7, 1778 – August 27, 1843) was a nineteenth-century American politician from Virginia and Ohio.

== Early life ==
Summers was born in Fairfax County, Virginia, and was educated in Alexandria.

== Career ==
The Virginia Capitol at Richmond VA where 19th century Conventions met

As an adult, Summers lived for several years in Alexandria, Virginia, and held the office of Marshall there for several years.

On moving to Ohio in 1808, he served in both houses of the Ohio State Legislature over a stay of six years there.

In 1814, Summers returned to Virginia, settling in Kanawha County. There he served in the Virginia Assembly in 1817-1818, before being appointed to the Virginia General Court in 1819. He later served as a judge on the Kanawha Circuit Court until his death.

In 1829, Summers was elected to the Virginia Constitutional Convention of 1829-1830. He was elected by the Convention to serve on the Committee on the Legislative Department. He was one of four delegates elected from the western senatorial district made up his home district of Cabell, and Kanawha, Mason, Randolph, Harrison, Lewis, Wood and Logan Counties.

Summers also served on the Virginia Board of Public Works for some years, seeking to expand the state’s internal improvements.

== Death ==
Lewis Summers died on August 27, 1843, in Greenbrier, West Virginia, White Sulphur Springs. He is buried at Walnut Grove, his county seat.

== Bibliography ==
- Pulliam, David Loyd (1901). The Constitutional Conventions of Virginia from the foundation of the Commonwealth to the present time. John T. West, Richmond. ISBN 978-1-2879-2059-5.
