= 1991 Virginia House of Delegates election =

Virginia House of Delegates election, 1991
- November 5, 1991

All 100 seats in the Virginia House of Delegates 51 seats needed for a majority
- Turnout: 49.1% ▼
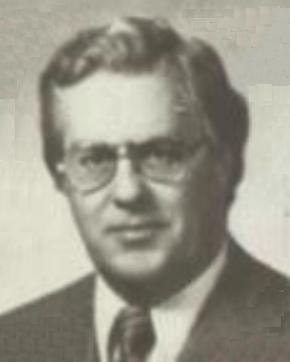

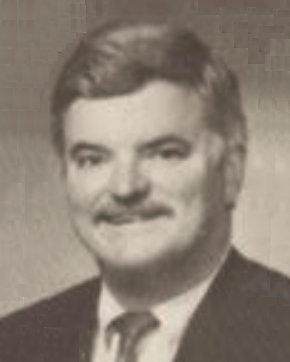
	Majority party	Minority party
Leader	Tom Moss	Andy Guest
Party	Democratic	Republican
Leader since	September 28, 1991	December 3, 1985
Leader's seat	88th	31st
Last election	59+1	40
Seats won	58+1	41
Seat change	▼1	▲1
Popular vote	623,577	493,658
Percentage	54.2%	42.9%
Swing	▲1.2%	▼2.1%
- Results: Republican hold Republican gain Democratic hold Democratic gain Independent hold
Speaker before election
Ford C. Quillen (acting)
Democratic
Elected Speaker
Tom Moss
Democratic

The Virginia House of Delegates election of 1991 was held on Tuesday, November 5. Just over a month earlier, on September 28, House Speaker A. L. Philpott died of cancer. Democratic floor leader Tom Moss led his party going into the election; Moss was elected Speaker two weeks later, after his conference maintained a majority in the chamber.

== Results ==
=== Overview ===
↓
58	41	1
Democratic	Republican

Parties		Candidates	Seats				Popular Vote		
Parties		Candidates	1989	1991	+/-	Strength	Vote	%	Change
	Democratic	83	59	58	▼1	58.00%	623,577	54.19%	
	Republican	64	40	41	▲1	41.00%	493,658	42.90%	
	Independent	11	1	1	Steady	1.00%	31,398	2.73%	
-	Write-ins	-	0	0	Steady	0.00%	2,169	0.19%	
Total		158	100	100	0	100.00%	1,150,802	100.00%	-

=== Detailed Results ===
District	Incumbent	Party	First elected	Result	Candidates
1	Ford C. Quillen	Democratic	1969	Re-elected	Ford C. Quillen (D) unopposed
2	Vacant				Bud Phillips (D) unopposed
2	Bud Phillips; Redistricted from the 3rd district	Democratic	1989	Re-elected	Bud Phillips (D) unopposed
3	Jackie T. Stump; Redistricted from the 4th district	Democratic	1989	Re-elected	Jackie T. Stump (D) unopposed
4	Joseph P. Johnson, Jr. Redistricted from the 6th district	Democratic	1965	Re-elected	Joseph P. Johnson, Jr. (D) unopposed
5	C. Jefferson Stafford	Republican	1971	Retired; Republican loss	Groven Cullen Jennings (D) 61.14% Barnes Lee Kidd (R) 38.85%
5	Groven Cullen Jennings; Redistricted from the 7th district	Democratic	1981	Re-elected	Groven Cullen Jennings (D) 61.14% Barnes Lee Kidd (R) 38.85%
6	Thomas M. Jackson, Jr. Redistricted from the 8th district	Democratic	1987	Re-elected	Thomas M. Jackson, Jr. (D) unopposed
7	Thomas G. Baker, Jr. Redistricted from the 12th district	Republican	1989	Re-elected	Thomas G. Baker, Jr. (R) 69.25% Dallas L. Cox (D) 30.72%
8	G. Steven Agee; Redistricted from the 15th district	Republican	1981	Re-elected	G. Steven Agee (R) unopposed
9	Willard R. Finney	Democratic	1982	Re-elected	Willard R. Finney (D) 52.53% Kenneth S. Rush (R) 47.41%
10	Roscoe Reynolds	Democratic	1985	Re-elected	Roscoe Reynolds (D) unopposed
11	A. L. Philpott	Democratic	1957	Retired; Democratic hold	Ward Armstrong (D) 76.84% Naomi L. Hodge-Muse (R) 23.08%
12	Joan H. Munford; Redistricted from the 13th district	Democratic	1981	Re-elected	Joan H. Munford (D) 57.22% Alvah T. Leighton, Jr. (R) 42.78%
13	None (District created)			New seat Republican gain	Robert G. Marshall (R) 57.72% R. Dale Reynolds (D) 42.22%
14	Richard Cranwell	Democratic	1971	Re-elected	Richard Cranwell (D) unopposed
15	Raymond R. Guest; Redistricted from the 31st district	Republican	1971	Re-elected	Raymond R. Guest (R) unopposed
16	Clifton A. Woodrum	Democratic	1979	Re-elected	Clifton A. Woodrum (D) unopposed
17	A. Victor Thomas	Democratic	1973	Re-elected	A. Victor Thomas (D) 79.71% Zaman K. McManaway (I) 20.27%
18	Emmett Hanger; Redistricted from the 26th district	Republican	1982	Loss re-election Democratic gain	Creigh Deeds (D) 57.07% Emmett Hanger (R) 42.93%

== See also ==
- 1991 United States elections
- 1991 Virginia elections
  - 1991 Virginia Senate election
