= 2013 Virginia House of Delegates election =

2013 Virginia House of Delegates elections
- November 5, 2013

All 100 seats in the Virginia House of Delegates 51 seats needed for a majority
- Turnout: 43.0% ▲14.4
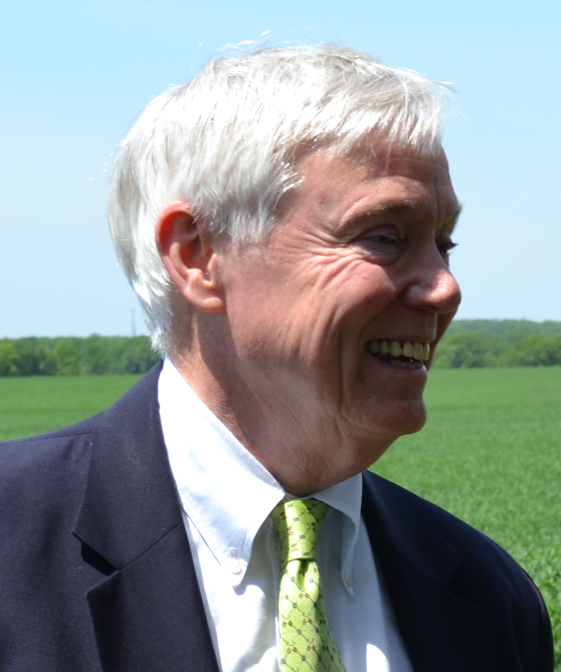

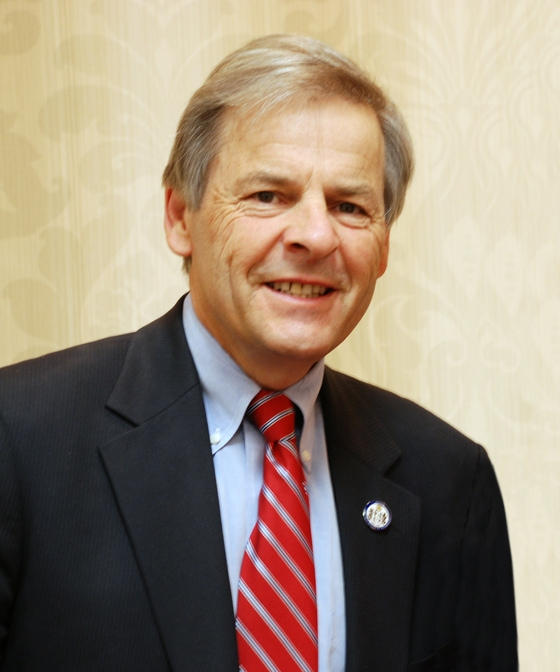
	Majority party	Minority party
Leader	Bill Howell	David Toscano
Party	Republican	Democratic
Leader since	January 8, 2003	November 19, 2011
Leader's seat	28th	57th
Last election	67	32
Seats won	67	33
Seat change	Steady	▲1
Popular vote	1,088,032	817,066
Percentage	53.8%	40.4%
Swing	▼6.0%	▲6.0%
- Results: Republican hold Republican gain Democratic hold Democratic gain
Speaker before election
Bill Howell
Republican
Elected Speaker
Bill Howell
Republican

The Virginia House of Delegates election of 2013 was held on Tuesday, November 5.

== Delegates not running for re-election ==
Delegate	Seat	First elected	Party	Date announced	Ref.
John Cosgrove (Note: Cosgrove filed to run but entered the special election to replace 14th district Senator Harry Blevins after Blevins announced his early retirement. Cosgrove won and was subsequently replaced on the November ballot by Jay Leftwich.)	78th district	2001	Republican	August 6, 2013	
John Cox	55th district	2009	Republican	March 5, 2013	
Annie Crockett-Stark	6th district	2005	Republican	March 13, 2013	
Sal Iaquinto	84th district	2005	Republican	February 23, 2013	
Joe Johnson	4th district	1989 (1966–70)	Democratic	February 26, 2013	
Donald Merricks	16th district	2007	Republican	March 6, 2013	
Bob Purkey	82nd district	1985	Republican	April 6, 2013	
Lacey Putney	19th district	1961	Independent	March 27, 2013	
Jim Scott	53rd district	1991	Democratic	March 3, 2013	
Bob Tata	85th district	1983	Republican	March 27, 2012	

== Results ==
=== Overview ===
↓
67	33
Republican	Democratic

Parties		Candidates	Seats				Popular Vote		
Parties		Candidates	2011	2013	+/-	Strength	Vote	%	Change
	Republican		67	67	Steady	67.00%	1,088,032	53.77%	
	Democratic		32	33	▲1	33.00%	817,066	40.38%	
	Independent		1	0	▼1	0.00%	47,817	2.36%	
	Libertarian		0	0	Steady	0.00%	15,252	0.75%	
	Independent Greens		0	0	Steady	0.00%	12,682	0.63%	
-	Write-ins		0	0	Steady	0.00%	42,773	2.11%	
Total			100	100	0	100.00%	2,023,622	100.00%	-

=== Seats that changed hands ===
Democratic to Republican (1)

- 4th district

Independent to Republican (1)

- 19th district

Republican to Democratic (2)

- 2nd district
- 93rd district

== See also ==
- United States elections, 2013
- Virginia elections, 2013
  - Virginia gubernatorial election, 2013
  - Virginia lieutenant gubernatorial election, 2013
  - Virginia Attorney General election, 2013
