= 1993 Virginia House of Delegates election =

Virginia House of Delegates election, 1993
- November 2, 1993

All 100 seats in the Virginia House of Delegates 51 seats needed for a majority
- Turnout: 61.1% ▲
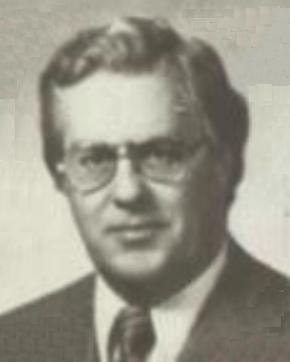

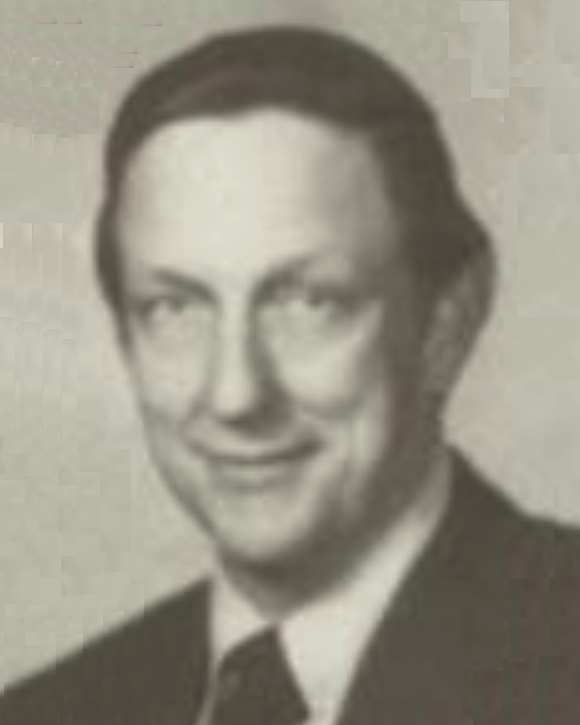
	Majority party	Minority party
Leader	Tom Moss	Vance Wilkins
Party	Democratic	Republican
Leader since	September 28, 1991	November 19, 1991
Leader's seat	88th	24th
Last election	58+1	41
Seats won	52+1	47
Seat change	▼7	▲7
Popular vote	683,381	800,251
Percentage	44.2%	51.7%
Swing	▼10.0%	▲8.8%
- Results: Republican hold Republican gain Democratic hold Independent hold
Speaker before election
Tom Moss
Democratic
Elected Speaker
Tom Moss
Democratic

The Virginia House of Delegates election of 1993 was held on Tuesday, November 2.

== Results ==
=== Overview ===
↓
52	47	1
Democratic	Republican

Parties		Candidates	Seats				Popular Vote		
Parties		Candidates	1991	1993	+/-	Strength	Vote	%	Change
	Democratic	78	58	52	▼6	52.00%	683,381	44.18%	
	Republican	78	41	47	▲6	47.00%	800,251	51.74%	
	Independent	34	1	1	Steady	1.00%	61,656	3.99%	
-	Write-ins	-	0	0	Steady	0.00%	1,474	0.10%	
Total		190	100	100	0	100.00%	1,546,762	100.00%	-

== See also ==
- 1993 United States elections
- 1993 Virginia elections
  - 1993 Virginia gubernatorial election
  - 1993 Virginia lieutenant gubernatorial election
  - 1993 Virginia Attorney General election
