= 1989 Virginia House of Delegates election =

Election for the Virginia House of Delegates held on November 7, 1989

Virginia House of Delegates election, 1989
- November 7, 1989

All 100 seats in the Virginia House of Delegates 51 seats needed for a majority
- Turnout: 66.5% ▲
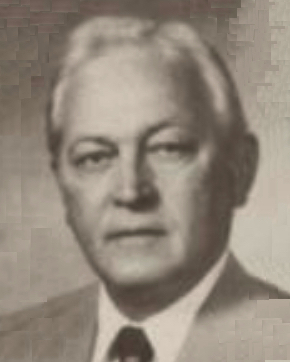

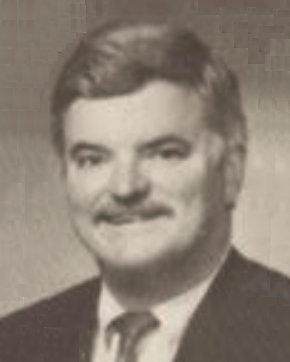
| | Majority party | Minority party |
|---|---|---|
| Leader | A. L. Philpott | Andy Guest |
| Party | Democratic | Republican |
| Leader since | January 9, 1980 | December 3, 1985 |
| Leader's seat | 11th | 31st |
| Last election | 64 + 1 | 35 |
| Seats won | 59 + 1 | 40 |
| Seat change | ▼5 | ▲5 |
| Popular vote | 788,087 | 668,856 |
| Percentage | 53.0% | 45.0% |
| Swing | ▼3.9% | ▲5.0% |
- Results: Republican hold Republican gain Democratic hold Democratic gain Independent hold Independent gain
Speaker before election
A. L. Philpott
Democratic
Elected Speaker
A. L. Philpott
Democratic

The Virginia House of Delegates election of 1989 was held on Tuesday, November 7. Primary elections were held on June 13, 1989.

== Results ==
=== Overview ===
↓
| 59 | 40 | 1 |
| Democratic | Republican |

| Parties | | Candidates | Seats | | | | Popular Vote | | |
| Parties | | Candidates | 1987 | 1989 | +/- | Strength | Vote | % | Change |
|---|---|---|---|---|---|---|---|---|---|
| | Democratic | 79 (Note: Jackie Stump was elected in the 4th district as an independent write-in candidate, but he then served in the Democratic caucus and is therefore included in the Democratic figures.) | 64 | 59 | ▼5 | 59.00% | 788,087 | 52.98% | |
| | Republican | 61 | 35 | 40 | ▲5 | 40.00% | 668,856 | 44.96% | |
| | Independent | 9 | 1 | 1 | Steady | 1.00% | 28,055 | 1.89% | |
| - | Write-ins | - | 0 | 0 | Steady | 0.00% | 2,643 | 0.18% | |
| Total | | 149 | 100 | 100 | 0 | 100.00% | 1,487,641 | 100.00% | - |

== See also ==
- 1989 United States elections
- 1989 Virginia elections
  - 1989 Virginia gubernatorial election
  - 1989 Virginia lieutenant gubernatorial election
  - 1989 Virginia Attorney General election
