= Morgan Griffith =

American politician (born 1958)

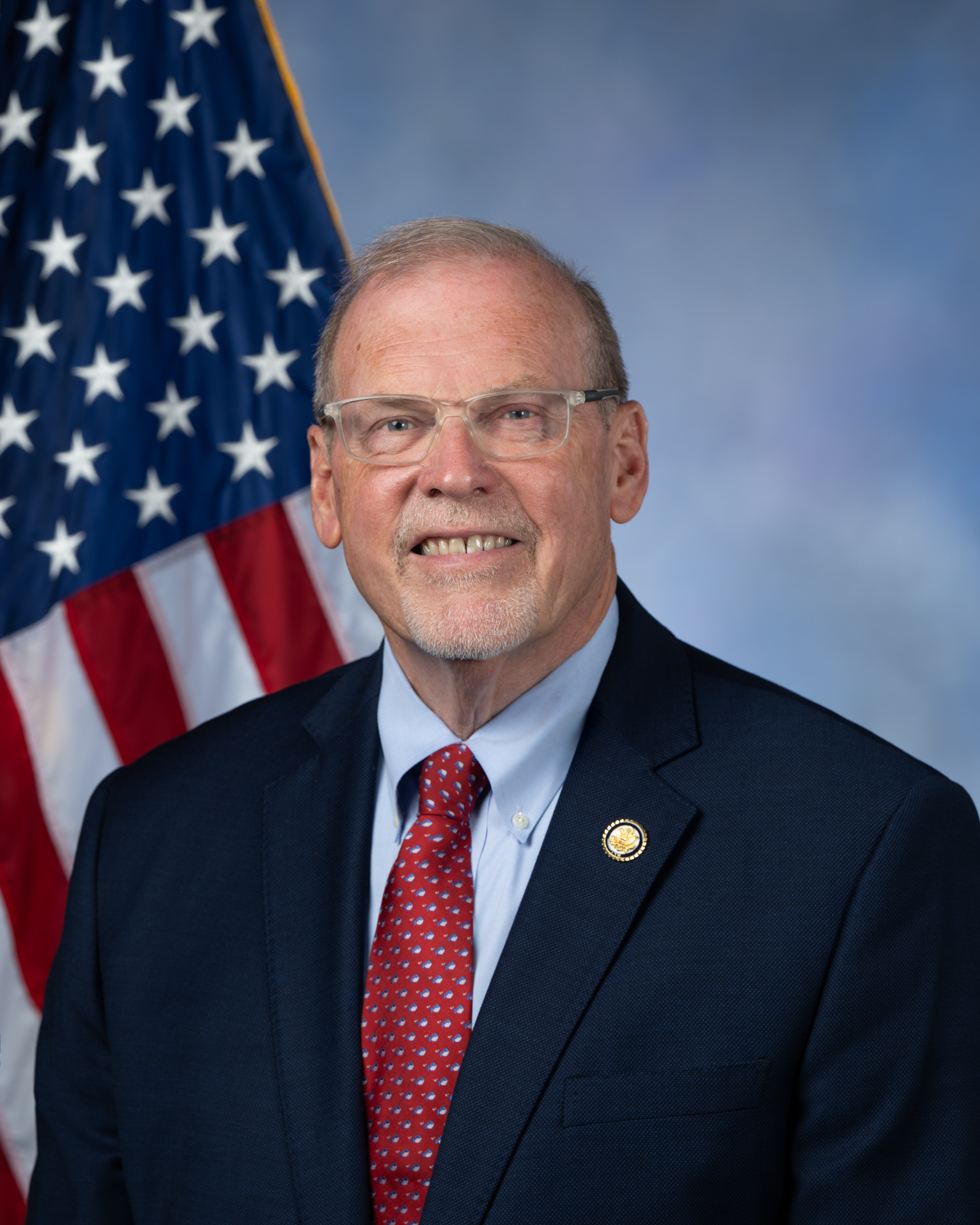
- Official portrait, 2025

Member of the U.S. House of Representatives from Virginia's 9th district
- Incumbent
- Assumed office January 3, 2011
- Preceded by: Rick Boucher

Majority Leader of the Virginia House of Delegates
- In office January 12, 2000 – December 5, 2010
- Preceded by: Richard Cranwell
- Succeeded by: Kirk Cox

Member of the Virginia House of Delegates from the 8th district
- In office January 12, 1994 – January 3, 2011
- Preceded by: G. Steven Agee
- Succeeded by: Greg Habeeb

Personal details
- Born: Howard Morgan Griffith; March 15, 1958 (age 68) Philadelphia, Pennsylvania, U.S.
- Party: Republican
- Spouse: Hilary Davis
- Children: 3
- Education: Emory and Henry University (BA); Washington and Lee University (JD)
- Website: House website Campaign website
- Griffith's voice Griffith supporting the Medical Marijuana Research Act. Recorded December 9, 2020

Howard Morgan Griffith (born March 15, 1958) is an American politician and lawyer serving as the U.S. representative for Virginia's 9th congressional district since 2011. A member of the Republican Party, his district covers the majority of rural Southwest Virginia, including the New River Valley and the Virginia side of the Tri-Cities.

Griffith was the majority leader of the Virginia House of Delegates and represented the 8th district from 1994 to 2011. The district was based in his hometown of Salem and included parts of surrounding Roanoke County. He is a member of the Freedom Caucus.

== Early life, education, and career ==
Griffith was born in Philadelphia, Pennsylvania, and in his infancy his family relocated to Salem, Virginia. He graduated from Andrew Lewis High School in 1976 and from Emory and Henry College in 1980 with a Bachelor of Arts. Griffith completed his education with a J.D. from the Washington and Lee University School of Law in 1983.

After law school, Griffith settled in Salem, where he worked as an attorney in private practice specializing in traffic violations and DUI. On June 23, 2008, Albo & Oblon LLP, a law firm run by fellow Republican delegate Dave Albo, announced that Griffith had joined the firm as head of its new Roanoke/Salem office.

== Early political career ==
Griffith's first entry into electoral politics came in 1986, when he was chosen as chair of the Salem Republican Party. He chaired the party from 1986 to 1988 and from 1991 to 1994.

== Virginia House of Delegates ==
In 1993, incumbent Delegate G. Steven Agee chose to run in the Republican primary for Attorney General. Griffith ran for the open seat representing the 8th district and won. He was elected to several terms, facing opposition only in 2001, 2003, and 2009. He served as vice chair of the Rules Committee and on the Courts of Justice Committee, and chaired its Criminal Law Subcommittee. He also served on the Commerce and Labor Committee, and the Committee on Militia, Police, and Public Safety. He was elected House Majority Leader in 2000, the first Republican to hold that position in Virginia's history.

== U.S. House of Representatives ==
=== Elections ===
==== 2010 ====
Rather than run for a tenth term in the House of Delegates, Griffith opted to challenge Congressman Rick Boucher, a 13-term incumbent Democrat who had served since 1983. His home in Salem was just outside the 9th's borders at the time, but the district included almost all of his House of Delegates district.

Griffith chose to run for Congress after Boucher voted for the cap and trade bill. Boucher capitalized on the fact that Griffith did not live in the district, and in return Griffith branded Boucher as a rubber stamp for Barack Obama and Nancy Pelosi. Griffith won the election by less than 5% of the vote. Americans for Prosperity, an advocacy group funded by oil magnates Charles Koch and David Koch, spent heavily in advertising against Boucher, accusing him of betraying the district's coal industry.

==== 2012 ====
Griffith defeated Democratic nominee Anthony Flaccavento, 61.3% to 38.6%.

==== 2014 ====
Griffith defeated independent candidate William Carr, 72.1% to 24.2%.

==== 2016 ====
Griffith defeated Democratic nominee Derek Kitts and Independent Janice Boyd with 68.59% of the vote.

==== 2018 ====
Griffith defeated Democratic opponent Anthony Flaccavento 65.2% to 34.7%, with 223 write-ins among 246,989 votes cast. (A "Modern Whig Party" had endorsed a candidate whose name ultimately did not appear on the ballot and is listed at Ballotpedia as a "withdrawn or disqualified" independent.)

==== 2020 ====
Griffith ran unopposed. He was reelected with 94.39% of the vote.

2024

Griffith defeated Democratic nominee Karen Baker. He was reelected with 72.5% of the vote.

=== Committee assignments ===
- Committee on Energy and Commerce
  - Subcommittee on Energy
  - Subcommittee on Health
  - Subcommittee on Oversight and Investigations

=== Caucus memberships ===
- Congressional Constitution Caucus
- Congressional Caucus on Turkey and Turkish Americans
- Congressional Western Caucus
- Veterinary Medicine Caucus
- Freedom Caucus
- Liberty Caucus
- Friends of Wales Caucus

== Electoral history ==
Virginia House of Delegates, District 8: Results 1995 to 2009
Year	Republican	Votes	Pct	Democratic	Votes	Pct	Third Party	Party	Votes	Pct
1995	Morgan Griffith	14,052	100%	no candidate			Write-ins		35	0%
1997	Morgan Griffith	15,383	100%	no candidate			Write-ins		12	0%
1999	Morgan Griffith	11,066	100%	no candidate			Write-ins		19	0%
2001	Morgan Griffith	17,401	70%	D. Martin	7,581	30%				
2003	Morgan Griffith	10,860	59%	M Q Emick Sr.	7,469	41%				
2005	Morgan Griffith	20,484	98%	no candidate			Write-ins		417	2%
2007	Morgan Griffith	13,670	96%	no candidate			Write-ins		563	4%
2009	Morgan Griffith	16,790	69%	E. Carter Turner III	7,563	31%				

Virginia's 9th congressional district
Year	Republican	Votes	Pct	Democratic	Votes	Pct	Third Party	Party	Votes	Pct
2010	Morgan Griffith	95,726	51.2%	Rick Boucher	86,743	46.4%	Jeremiah Heaton	Independent	4,282	2.3%
2012	Morgan Griffith	184,882	61.28%	Anthony Flaccavento	116,400	38.58%	Write-ins		376	0.12%
2014	Morgan Griffith	117,465	72.15%	no candidate			William Carr	Independent	39,412	24.21%
2016	Morgan Griffith	212,838	68.6%	Derek Kitts	87,877	28.3%	Janice Allen Boyd	Independent	9,050	2.9%
2018	Morgan Griffith	160,933	65.2%	Anthony Flaccavento	85,833	34.8%	Write-ins		214	0.1%
2020	Morgan Griffith	271,851	94.0%	no candidate			Write-ins		17,423	6.0%
2022	Morgan Griffith	182,207	73.2%	Taysha DeVaughan	66,027	26.5	Write-ins		558	0.2%
2024	Morgan Griffith	290,645	72.5%	Karen G. H. Baker	109,570	27.3%	Write-ins		748	0.2%

== Political positions ==
=== Immigration ===
Griffith has voted to allow Virginia to enforce federal immigration laws to criminalize knowingly employing illegal immigrants or undocumented workers, and also voted to criminalize possession of firearms by illegal aliens.

Griffith voted against the Further Consolidated Appropriations Act of 2020 which authorizes the Department of Homeland Security to nearly double the available H-2B visas for the remainder of FY 2020.

Griffith voted against the Consolidated Appropriations Act (H.R. 1158), which effectively prohibits Immigration and Customs Enforcement from cooperating with the Department of Health and Human Services to detain or remove illegal alien sponsors of Unaccompanied Alien Children. The measure was approved by both houses of Congress and signed into law by President Donald Trump on December 10, 2019.

He has argued that birthright citizenship should be restricted in U.S. territories.

=== Gay rights ===
While serving in the Virginia House of Delegates, Griffith supported a constitutional amendment to prohibit same-sex marriage by defining marriage as between one man and one woman. He voted in favor of a motion to effectively kill a bill to prohibit discrimination on the basis of sexual orientation for government employees in Virginia.

=== Environment ===
Upon taking office in 2011, Griffith supported significant funding cuts for the Environmental Protection Agency (EPA). Griffith suggested that "many scientists do not even believe" in anthropogenic climate change. In a congressional hearing on climate change, Griffith told scientists that they should consider the possibility that the Vikings and the ancient peoples of Mesopotamia were successful because of global warming. He further suggested that the melting of the ice caps on Mars disproved the theory that humans were responsible for climate change on Earth. Griffith introduced an amendment to a spending bill that would have prohibited EPA regulation of surface coal mining operations, and the EPA Regulatory Relief Act, which would have blocked federal regulations on boilers.

In 2017, Griffith voted to nullify the Stream Protection Rule, which included improvements in the protection of water supplies, water quality, streams, fish and other wildlife that can be negatively affected by surface coal mining. The same year, he joined other members of the House of Representatives in passing an amendment to H.R. 3354, which undermined the Environmental Protection Agency’s ability to enforce environmental standards in the Chesapeake Bay watershed, which covers six states and the District of Columbia.

Griffith is a proponent of "an 'all of the above' energy strategy" that utilizes both fossil fuel and renewable energy sources. In 2011, he joined other GOP members in urging Interior Secretary Ken Salazar to reconsider the ban on offshore drilling off Virginia's coast.

=== Gun rights ===
Griffith voted in favor of several bills to reduce restrictions on gun ownership, including a bill to allow concealed weapons in vehicles without a permit and to allow concealed weapons permit holders to carry their firearms in restaurants and bars. He also voted to prohibit consumption of alcohol while in possession of a concealed weapon. In 2004 Griffith voted to prohibit carrying firearms or ammunition in non-secure areas of airport terminals, including baggage claim areas.

=== Health care ===
Early in 2010, Griffith voted in favor of a bill to prohibit any individual mandate to purchase health insurance. This law passed Virginia's legislature before the federal Patient Protection and Affordable Care Act was enacted, which Virginia has used to challenge the individual mandate in federal court. On July 17, 2013, Griffith was the lone GOP member of the House to vote against delaying the implementation of the individual mandate.

Just before the United States federal government shutdown of 2013, Griffith issued a press release in which he endorsed the final House version of Continuing Appropriations Resolution, 2014, which would have continued funding for federal government operations while delaying implementation of the Affordable Care Act. He voted against the Continuing Appropriations Act, 2014, the Senate-proposed compromise that ended the shutdown without defunding the ACA.

=== Death penalty ===
Griffith has consistently voted for expansions of the death penalty to include eligibility for accomplices to a murder, as well as for those who murder a judge or a witness.

=== Abortion ===
When surveyed in 1999 on his political positions by Project Vote Smart, Griffith indicated that he supports legalized abortion in the first trimester and to save the life of the mother, while favoring the restriction of abortion through parental notification laws and prohibition of partial-birth abortion. His voting record has generally been consistent with that survey, voting in favor of restrictions such as parental-notification and parental-consent, restricting state funding of abortions, and requiring abortion clinics to meet the same licensing requirements as surgical centers. In 2006 Griffith voted to restrict state funding for fetal stem cell research.

In 2007 Griffith voted against a bill in the Virginia General Assembly, HB 2797, which stated "That life begins at the moment of fertilization and the right to enjoyment of life guaranteed by Article 1, § 1 of the Constitution of Virginia is vested in each born and preborn human being from the moment of fertilization".

Griffith's 2010 campaign website reported that Griffith has a "100% pro-life" voting record and an "A" rating from the Virginia Society for Human Life (VSHL). But VSHL's report on 2007 legislation in Virginia omits reference to HB 2797. Project Vote Smart indicated that Griffith declined to retake their survey in 2010.

=== Taxes and spending ===
Griffith supports raising the retirement age and reducing the number of American troops serving overseas as means of reducing the federal budget deficit. Most recently, he voted for the Tax Cuts and Jobs Act of 2017.

=== Medical marijuana ===
In 2014, Griffith introduced legislation to move marijuana from a Schedule I to a Schedule II narcotic, which would effectively make the drug legal for medical purposes under federal law.

=== Israel-Palestine ===
Griffith voted to support Israel following the October 7 attacks.

== Personal life ==
Griffith and his wife, the former Hilary Davis, have three children. He is an Episcopalian.

In 2014, Griffith founded the Congressional Friends of Wales Caucus in honor of his Welsh heritage.

Virginia House of Delegates
Preceded by Richard Cranwell	Majority Leader of the Virginia House of Delegates; 2000–2010	Succeeded by Kirk Cox
U.S. House of Representatives
Preceded by Rick Boucher	Member of the U.S. House of Representatives from Virginia's 9th congressional district 2011–present	Incumbent
U.S. order of precedence (ceremonial)
Preceded by Paul Gosar	United States representatives by seniority 82nd	Succeeded by Andy Harris
