= 1997 Virginia House of Delegates election =

1997 Virginia House of Delegates elections
- November 4, 1997

All 100 seats in the Virginia House of Delegates 51 seats needed for a majority
- Turnout: 49.5% ▼
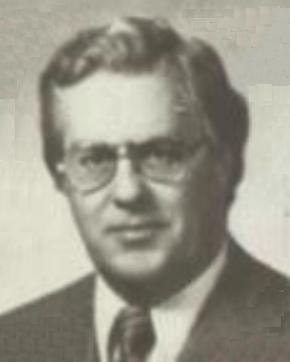

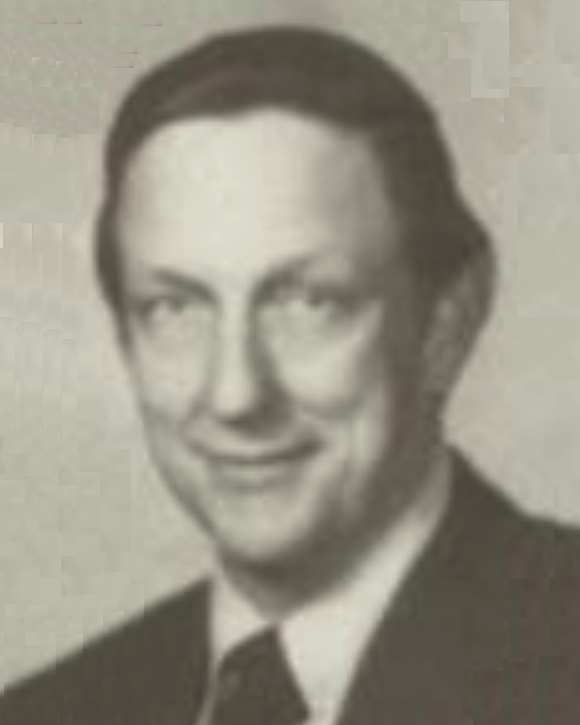
	Majority party	Minority party
Leader	Tom Moss	Vance Wilkins
Party	Democratic	Republican
Leader since	September 28, 1991	November 19, 1991
Leader's seat	88th	24th
Last election	52	47
Seats won	51	48
Seat change	▼1	▲1
Popular vote	658,203	779,031
Percentage	43.8%	51.8%
Swing	▼2.9%	▲1.1%
- Results: Republican hold Republican gain Democratic hold Independent hold
Speaker before election
Tom Moss
Democratic
Elected Speaker
Tom Moss
Democratic

The Virginia House of Delegates election of 1997 was held on Tuesday, November 4. The 1997 general election yielded a 51-48-1 Democratic majority. David Brickley resigned his seat right afterward, however, and a special election for District 51 was called. His seat flipped to the Republicans, and with Independent Lacey Putney siding with the Republicans, the chamber was tied. Democrats retained the Speakership through a power-sharing agreement.

== Results ==
=== Overview ===
↓
51	48	1
Democratic	Republican

Parties		Candidates	Seats				Popular Vote		
Parties		Candidates	1995	1997	+/-	Strength	Vote	%	Change
	Democratic	70	52	51	▼1	51.00%	658,203	43.75%	
	Republican	68	47	48	▲1	48.00%	779,031	51.78%	
	Independent	19	1	1	Steady	1.00%	52,099	3.46%	
	Reform Party	4	0	0	Steady	0.00%	7,932	0.53%	
-	Write-ins	-	0	0	Steady	0.00%	7,287	0.48%	
Total		161	100	100	0	100.00%	1,504,552	100.00%	-

== See also ==
- 1997 United States elections
- 1997 Virginia elections
  - 1997 Virginia gubernatorial election
  - 1997 Virginia lieutenant gubernatorial election
  - 1997 Virginia Attorney General election
