= 1995 Virginia House of Delegates election =

1995 Virginia House of Delegates elections
- November 7, 1995

All 100 seats in the Virginia House of Delegates 51 seats needed for a majority
- Turnout: 52.2% ▼
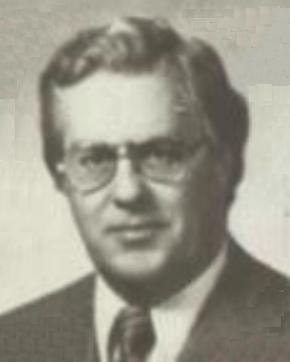

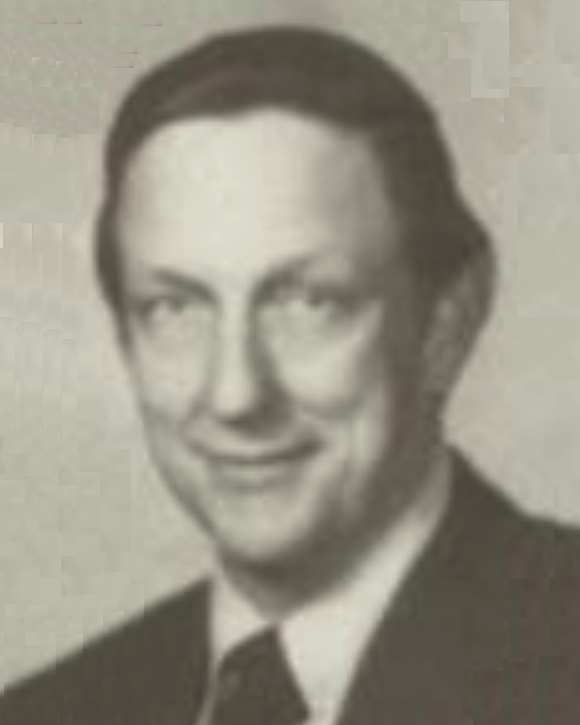
	Majority party	Minority party
Leader	Tom Moss	Vance Wilkins
Party	Democratic	Republican
Leader since	September 28, 1991	November 19, 1991
Leader's seat	88th	24th
Last election	52+1	47
Seats won	52+1	47
Seat change	Steady	Steady
Popular vote	660,927	717,435
Percentage	46.7%	50.7%
Swing	▲2.5%	▼1.1%
- Results: Republican hold Republican gain Democratic hold Democratic gain Independent hold
Speaker before election
Tom Moss
Democratic
Elected Speaker
Tom Moss
Democratic

The Virginia House of Delegates election of 1995 was held on Tuesday, November 7.

== Results ==
=== Overview ===
↓
52	47	1
Democratic	Republican

Parties		Candidates	Seats				Popular Vote		
Parties		Candidates	1993	1995	+/-	Strength	Vote	%	Change
	Democratic	80	52	52	Steady	52.00%	660,927	46.66%	
	Republican	82	47	47	Steady	47.00%	717,435	50.65%	
	Independent	14	1	1	Steady	1.00%	34,289	2.42%	
-	Write-ins	-	0	0	Steady	0.00%	3,756	0.27%	
Total		179	100	100	0	100.00%	1,416,407	100.00%	-

== See also ==
- 1995 Virginia elections
  - 1995 Virginia Senate election
