= 1999 Virginia House of Delegates election =

1999 Virginia House of Delegates elections
- November 2, 1999

All 100 seats in the Virginia House of Delegates 51 seats needed for a majority
- Turnout: 36.1% ▼
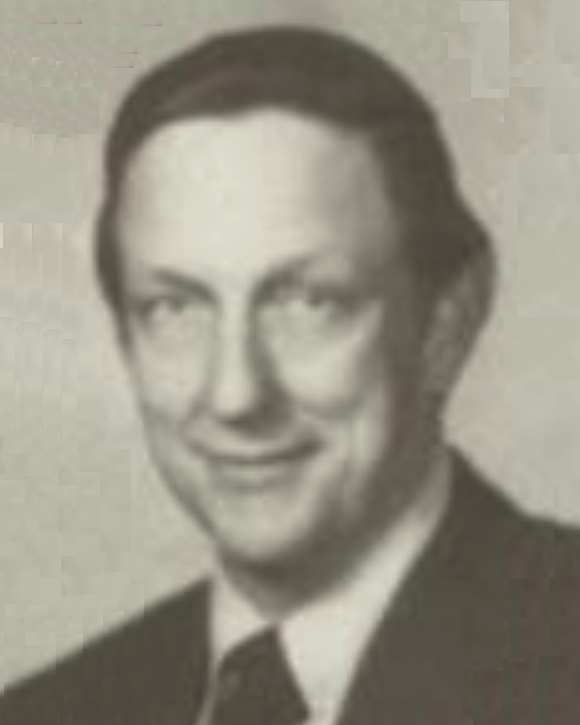

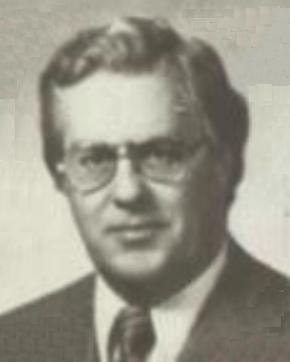
	Majority party	Minority party
Leader	Vance Wilkins	Tom Moss
Party	Republican	Democratic
Leader since	November 19, 1991	September 28, 1991
Leader's seat	24th	88th
Seats before	49+1	50
Seats won	52+1	47
Seat change	▲3	▼3
Popular vote	606,235	526,294
Percentage	50.5%	43.9%
Swing	▼1.2%	▲0.1%
- Results: Republican hold Republican gain Democratic hold Democratic gain Independent hold
Speaker before election
Tom Moss
Democratic
Elected Speaker
Vance Wilkins
Republican

The Virginia House of Delegates election of 1999 was held on Tuesday, November 2.

Independent Lacey Putney sided with the Republicans in the previous legislature, leaving the chamber tied. However, Republicans flipped three seats in this election, and won their first ever majority in the House of Delegates.

== Results ==
=== Overview ===
↓
52	47	1
Republican	Democratic

Parties		Candidates	Seats				Popular Vote		
Parties		Candidates	1997	1999	+/-	Strength	Vote	%	Change
	Republican	71	48	52	▲4	52.00%	606,235	50.53%	
	Democratic	66	51	47	▼4	47.00%	526,294	43.87%	
	Independent	25	1	1	Steady	1.00%	60,812	5.07%	
-	Write-ins	-	0	0	Steady	0.00%	6,308	0.53%	
Total		162	100	100	0	100.00%	1,199,649	100.00%	-

== See also ==
- 1999 United States elections
- 1999 Virginia elections
  - 1999 Virginia Senate election
