= Senator Denny =

Senator Denny may refer to:

- Joseph H. Denny (1883–1962), Vermont State Senate
- Joseph S. Denny (1870–1932), Virginia State Senate
- William H. P. Denny (1811–1890), Ohio State Senate
