= Richard Cranwell =

American lawyer and politician

C. Richard Cranwell
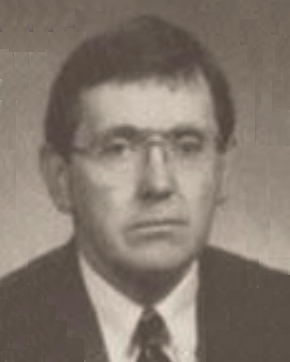

Chair of the Democratic Party of Virginia
- In office June 18, 2005 – December 4, 2010
- Preceded by: Kerry J. Donley
- Succeeded by: Brian Moran

Member of the Virginia House of Delegates
- In office January 12, 1972 – January 9, 2002 Serving with Raymond Robrecht (1972‍–‍1982); G. Steven Agee (1982‍–‍1983)
- Preceded by: John W. Hagen
- Succeeded by: Danny Marshall (redistricting)
- Constituency: 8th district (1972‍–‍1982); 7th district (1982‍–‍1983); 14th district (1983‍–‍2002)
Caucus positions
House Minority Leader
In office January 12, 2000 – January 9, 2002
Preceded by	Vance Wilkins
Succeeded by	Frank Hall
House Majority Leader
In office November 19, 1991 – January 12, 2000
Preceded by	Tom Moss
Succeeded by	Morgan Griffith

Personal details
- Born: Charles Richard Cranwell; July 26, 1942 (age 83) Ceredo-Kenova, West Virginia, United States
- Party: Democratic
- Education: Virginia Tech (BS); University of Richmond (JD)
- Occupation: Lawyer; politician

Charles Richard Cranwell (born July 26, 1942) is an American lawyer and Democratic Party politician. He was a member of the Virginia House of Delegates 1972–2001, and was its Democratic floor leader 1991–2001. From 2005 to 2010, he was chairman of the Democratic Party of Virginia.

== Personal life and non-political career ==
Cranwell attended Richlands High School in Tazewell County, Virginia. As the varsity quarterback, he led the state in touchdown passes his senior year. He would go on to play football in college, transitioning to kicker. He received a B.S. degree from Virginia Polytechnic Institute in 1965, and his J.D. from the University of Richmond School of Law in 1968. He was then admitted to the Virginia State Bar and took up practice in Roanoke County, Virginia.

He is an active member of the Virginia State Bar, the American Bar Association, the Association of Trial Lawyers of America, the Academy of Rail Labor Attorneys, the Million Dollar Advocates Forum, the Virginia Trial Lawyers Association, and the Roanoke County-Salem Bar Association.

Cranwell currently resides in Vinton, Virginia and is a member of Vinton's Chamber of Commerce and its Lions Club. He has been married twice and had six children.

== Political career ==
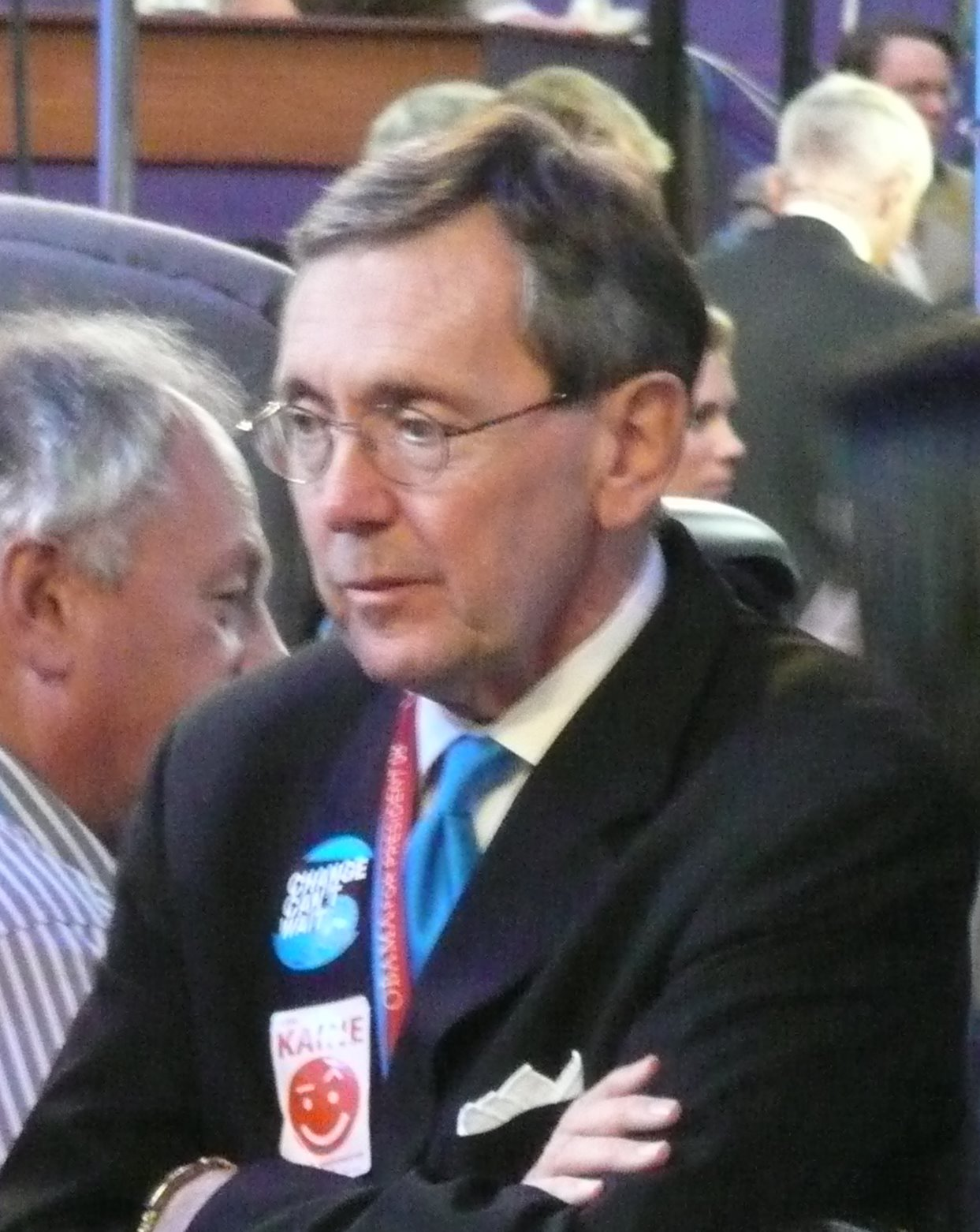
Dick Cranwell at the 2008 Democratic National Convention

Cranwell was first elected to the Virginia House of Delegates in 1972, sharing the multi-member 8th district (Craig and Roanoke Counties and the city of Salem) with Republican Raymond Robrecht. In 1982, after redistricting, he shared the same district, now numbered the 7th, with another Republican, G. Steven Agee. A second redistricting converted the House entirely to single-member districts in 1983. He won election in the new 14th district, made up of pieces of Craig, Roanoke and Bedford Counties. He stayed in the 14th until his retirement from the House in 2001.

Cranwell served as chair of the Militia and Police committee 1978–1987, then took over the chairmanship of the Finance committee. In September 1991, Speaker A. L. Philpott, a terminal cancer patient, retired. Cranwell lost to Tom Moss of Norfolk for the Democratic Caucus nomination to succeed Philpott. Moss then became Speaker, and Cranwell became Majority leader.

Republicans gained parity with Democrats in the House after the 1997 elections, part of a Republican sweep driven by gubernatorial candidate Jim Gilmore's campaign promise to eliminate the personal property tax on automobiles. While the Democrats retained nominal majority caucus status and Moss remained Speaker, committee chairs were shared between the two parties, and Republican Harry Parrish became Finance co-chair with Cranwell. The committee sharing relationship continued for two years after Republicans took majority control in 2000. Moss conceded the Minority leader position to Cranwell.

The Republicans had complete control of the redistricting process in 2001, and dismantled Cranwell's district. Portions of his district were split among three Republican-held districts. Cranwell retired to focus on his law practice.

Cranwell was elected as state Democratic party chair on June 18, 2005.
