= G. Alvin Massenburg =

American politician (1894–1968)

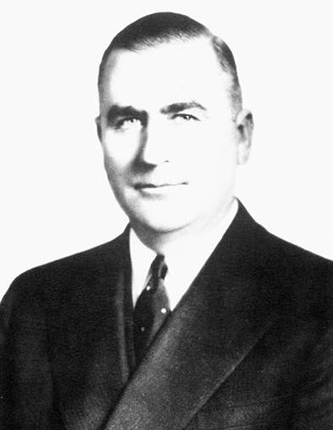

48th Speaker of the Virginia House of Delegates
- In office January 6, 1947 – January 11, 1950
- Preceded by: Thomas B. Stanley
- Succeeded by: E. Blackburn Moore

Member of the Virginia House of Delegates for Elizabeth City and Hampton
- In office January 13, 1926 – January 11, 1950
- Preceded by: Harry R. Houston
- Succeeded by: Victor P. Wilson

Personal details
- Born: George Alvin Massenburg; September 19, 1894 Hampton, Virginia, U.S.
- Died: November 25, 1968 (aged 74) Hampton, Virginia, U.S.
- Party: Democratic
- Spouse: Carrie Wood
- Occupation: Maritime pilot
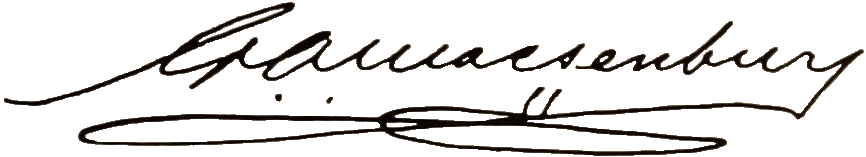
- Signature

Military service
- Allegiance: United States
- Branch/service: United States Coast Guard
- Years of service: 1942–1945
- Rank: Captain
- Unit: U.S. Coast Guard Reserve

George Alvin Massenburg (September 19, 1894 – November 25, 1968) was an American politician. A Democrat, he served in the Virginia House of Delegates from 1926 to 1950 and served as its Speaker from 1947 to 1950.

== Personal life ==
Massenburg was born in Hampton, Virginia, to Virginius and Virginia Massenburg. He left high school after two years for an electrical engineering apprenticeship. He became a maritime pilot in the area of Hampton Roads and the mouth of the Chesapeake Bay, eventually becoming president of the Virginia Pilot Association. He held a commission in the United States Coast Guard Reserve, rising to the rank of captain during the World War II era.

He married Carrie Wood of Hampton October 19, 1918.

== Political career ==
Massenburg first entered the Virginia House of Delegates in 1926. In January of the same year he introduced a bill that required any public area to be segregated by race. Passing the house 63-3 then the senate 30-5 this would become one of the strongest segregation legislation in the country. He became Democratic floor leader from 1936, succeeding Ashton Dovell when he became speaker, and served until becoming speaker himself. By 1940 he had become chair of the Privileges and Elections committee. He succeeded Thomas B. Stanley as Speaker in 1947, after Stanley's election to the United States House of Representatives. He retired from the House in 1950.

From 1948–52 Massenburg was chair of the State Democratic Committee. He was a delegate to the 1948 and 1952 Democratic National Conventions. In 1956, he was an unsuccessful candidate for presidential elector in support of Adlai Stevenson and Estes Kefauver.

== Death ==
Massenburg died in Hampton November 25, 1968. He was interred in the cemetery of St. John's Episcopal Church in Hampton.
