= Alice Jackson (disambiguation) =

Alice Jackson may refer to:

- Alice Jackson (born 1958), American sprinter
- Alice Jackson (editor) (1887–1974), Australian magazine editor
- Alice Jackson Stuart (1913–2001), American educator
