= 1985 Virginia House of Delegates election =

Virginia House of Delegates election, 1985
- November 5, 1985

All 100 seats in the Virginia House of Delegates 51 seats needed for a majority
- Turnout: 53.0% ▲
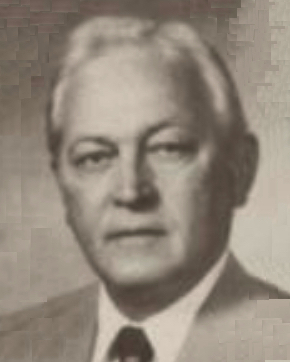

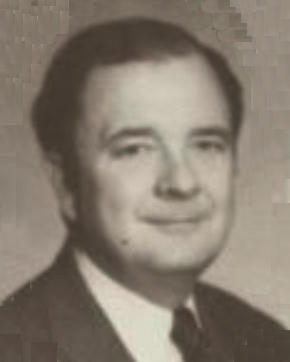
| | Majority party | Minority party |
|---|---|---|
| Leader | A. L. Philpott | Vince Callahan |
| Party | Democratic | Republican |
| Leader since | January 9, 1980 | January 13, 1982 |
| Leader's seat | 11th | 34th |
| Last election | 65 | 34 |
| Seats won | 65 | 33 |
| Seat change | Steady | ▼1 |
| Popular vote | 630,701 | 427,656 |
| Percentage | 58.3% | 39.5% |
- Results: Republican hold Republican gain Democratic hold Democratic gain Independent hold Independent gain
Speaker before election
A. L. Philpott
Democratic
Elected Speaker
A. L. Philpott
Democratic

The Virginia House of Delegates election of 1985 was held on Tuesday, November 5. Primary elections were held on June 11, 1985.

== Results ==
=== Overview ===
↓
| 65 | 33 | 2 |
| Democratic | Republican |

| Parties | | Candidates | Seats | | | | Popular Vote | | |
| Parties | | Candidates | 1983 | 1985 | +/- | Strength | Vote | % | Change |
|---|---|---|---|---|---|---|---|---|---|
| | Democratic | 79 | 65 | 65 | Steady | 65.00% | 630,701 | 58.29% | |
| | Republican | 59 | 34 | 33 | ▼1 | 33.00% | 427,656 | 39.52% | |
| | Independent | 5 | 1 | 2 | ▲1 | 0.00% | 23,050 | 2.13% | |
| - | Write-ins | - | 0 | 0 | Steady | 0.00% | 603 | 0.06% | |
| Total | | 143 | 100 | 100 | 0 | 100.00% | 1,082,010 | 100.00% | - |

== See also ==
- 1985 United States elections
- 1985 Virginia elections
  - 1985 Virginia gubernatorial election
  - 1985 Virginia lieutenant gubernatorial election
  - 1985 Virginia Attorney General election
