= Dovell Act =

1936 Virginia legislation

The Dovell Act, or Stephens-Dovell Act, was legislation in the U.S. state of Virginia that provided out-of-state tuition to its African American residents, who were barred from attending in-state public institutions of higher learning during segregation. It passed in 1936 after Alice Jackson was denied admittance to the University of Virginia.

Jackson applied to UVA in 1935. After she was denied admission a graduate school was established at Virginia State University in Petersburg, Virginia. The Foster brothers were among those who used the tuition support program to study out of state. Jackson went on to pursue her studies at Columbia University. Several other states had similar programs.

Gregory Swanson sued to gain admission to University of Virginia Law School. He was admitted in 1950.

== See also ==
- Ashton Dovell
- Murray v. Pearson
- Oliver Hill (attorney)
- School segregation in the United States
- Spottswood Robinson
