= J. Sinclair Brown =

American politician

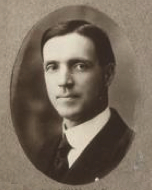

45th Speaker of the Virginia House of Delegates
- In office January 8, 1930 – January 8, 1936
- Preceded by: Thomas W. Ozlin
- Succeeded by: Ashton Dovell

Member of the Virginia House of Delegates from Roanoke County
- In office January 12, 1916 – January 8, 1936
- Preceded by: Orren L. Stearnes
- Succeeded by: Benjamin E. Chapman

Personal details
- Born: John Sinclair Brown; September 30, 1880 Warm Springs, Virginia, U.S.
- Died: January 15, 1965 (aged 84) Salem, Virginia, U.S.
- Party: Democratic
- Spouse: Jane Lewis Johnston

John Sinclair Brown (September 30, 1880 – January 15, 1965) was a Virginia politician. He represented Roanoke County in the Virginia House of Delegates, and served as that body's Speaker from 1930 until 1936.

Brown Library, built in 1969, is the main academic library at Virginia Western Community College in Roanoke, Virginia and was named for Colonel Brown in recognition of his service to the Roanoke Valley community.
