= E. Blackburn Moore =

American politician (1897–1980)

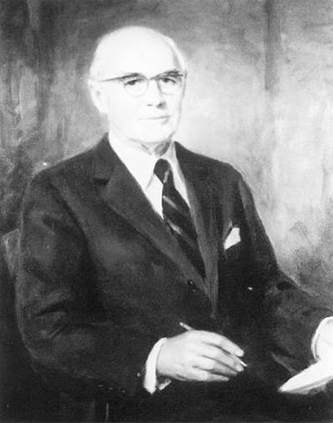

49th Speaker of the Virginia House of Delegates
- In office January 11, 1950 – January 10, 1968
- Preceded by: G. Alvin Massenburg
- Succeeded by: John Warren Cooke

Member of the Virginia House of Delegates from the 24th district
- In office January 8, 1964 – January 10, 1968
- Preceded by: Junie L. Bradshaw
- Succeeded by: Flournoy L. Largent Jr.

Member of the Virginia House of Delegates from the 25th district
- In office January 10, 1962 – January 8, 1964
- Preceded by: None (district created)
- Succeeded by: Wilbur C. Daniel

Member of the Virginia House of Delegates for Clarke, Frederick, and Winchester
- In office August 17, 1933 – January 10, 1962
- Preceded by: Joseph S. Denny
- Succeeded by: None (districts numbered)

Personal details
- Born: Edgar Blackburn Moore; April 26, 1897 Washington, D.C., U.S.
- Died: July 22, 1980 (aged 83) Winchester, Virginia, U.S.
- Resting place: Greenhill Cemetery; Berryville, Virginia, U.S.
- Party: Democratic
- Spouse: Dorothy Parker
- Education: Davidson College; Cornell University
- Occupation: Politician; farmer; banker

Edgar Blackburn "Blackie" Moore (April 26, 1897 – July 22, 1980) was an American politician. A Democrat, he served in the Virginia House of Delegates 1933–1967 and was its Speaker 1950–1967, making him the second longest serving Speaker after Linn Banks.

== Personal life ==
Moore was born in Washington, D.C. He attended Davidson College and Cornell University. On September 8, 1920 he married Dorothy Parker of Charlotte, North Carolina.

Moore lived in Berryville in Clarke County, Virginia. He was a fruit grower and banker.

== Political career ==
Moore entered the House of Delegates in 1933. By 1942 he had been named chair of the Confirmation Committee. He joined the Rules Committee in 1948, and was chosen as Speaker in 1950.

Moore was an alternate delegate to the 1944 Democratic National Convention, and a full delegate in 1948.

He became a member of the State Water Control Board when it was established in 1946 and served on it until 1970. He was its chair most of that period.

== Later life ==
Moore died in Winchester on July 22, 1980. He is buried in Greenhill Cemetery in Berryville.
