= Giles Buckner Cooke =

Confederate officer in the American Civil War

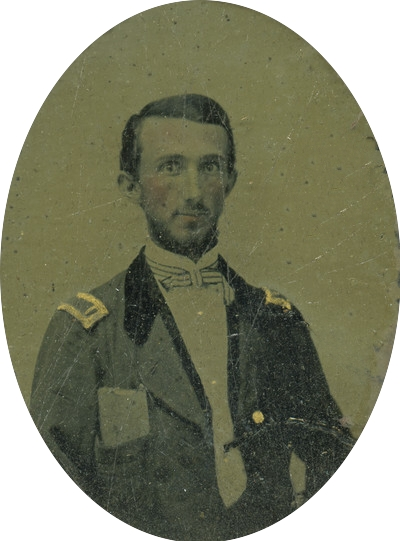
Wartime photograph of Giles Buckner Cooke

Giles Buckner Cooke (May 13, 1838 – February 4, 1937) was a Confederate officer in the American Civil War, a school teacher and school principal, and an Episcopal priest. He is best known for his service on the personal staff of Gen. Robert E. Lee during the Siege of Petersburg and the closing months of the active existence of the Army of Northern Virginia. As a commissioned veteran of the defeated Confederate cause, he changed careers and because an educator and ordained minister. When he died in 1937, he was the last survivor of General Lee's military family.

== Biography ==
=== American Civil War ===
Cooke was born on May 13, 1838, in Portsmouth, Virginia. He matriculated at the Virginia Military Institute in 1855, where records show repeated disciplinary infractions for absence from barracks without leave, assault, battery, and drunkenness. On one occasion young Cooke was expelled from V.M.I. and later reinstated. Cooke graduated in 1859 and joined the colors of the state of Virginia in April 1861. He made a lateral transfer to the Confederate Army four days after his initial enlistment. Cooke's V.M.I. record did not create any problems that affected his service in the Southern officer corps.

Cooke, during his time in the officer corps of the Confederate States of America, saw senior staff service and active combat in both Virginia and the Western theater. After initial staff service with Gen. Philip St. George Cocke and Gen. P.G.T. Beauregard, Cooke became a member of the staff of Gen. Braxton Bragg. He served under Bragg at the Battle of Shiloh and its aftermath. While in this assignment, he was able to save the life of a private soldier whom Bragg had ordered to be summarily shot for breach of discipline.

Cooke left Bragg's staff in August 1862 and took on various assignments in Western Virginia and in Florida. In October 1864 he was assigned to serve as assistant adjutant and inspector general, with the rank of major, of the Army of Northern Virginia. This made him a member of General Lee's personal staff, on which he served until Appomattox. Cooke assisted Lee during the Siege of Petersburg and attempted to continue this service during the final retreat from Richmond, but was wounded on April 6, 1865, at the Battle of Sailor's Creek. Lee surrendered his army on April 9, 1865, returning Cooke to civilian life.

=== Episcopal Church ===
After surviving a severe illness early in his Confederate service, Cooke was baptized into the Christian faith in July 1861. His diary shows that when he tried to help his fellow soldiers, as in the Bragg affair of May 30, 1862, he did so within a self-consciously Christian context. After his army service ended in April 1865, Cooke returned to Petersburg and began to study to become a teacher and Episcopal priest. He chose African-American education, in which he took executive roles from the start. He headed a segregated Sunday school, affiliated with St. Paul Episcopal Church in Petersburg, in 1867-1868. Cooke was then appointed principal of Petersburg's Elementary School #1, also for black children, and served in this role in 1868-1871. Elementary School #1 is said to have been the first public school for African-Americans in Virginia.

Cooke also pursued religious life after the close of the war. He was ordained as a deacon of the Episcopal Church in 1871, and withdrew from public-school education at this time. He organized a series of private schools for African-Americans, all of them in Petersburg and affiliated with the Episcopal church, in 1871-1885. He was named a rector in 1873, and ordained as a priest in 1874. Cooke then served in a series of pulpits and educational leadership positions in Maryland, Kentucky, and Virginia from 1885 through 1917, being named a convocational dean in 1898. He concluded his service as rector of All Saints Episcopal Church in his birth city, Portsmouth, Virginia, in 1915-17. He died on February 4, 1937, at his home in Mathews County, Virginia.

=== Legacy ===
As a priest and rector, Cooke married twice. His first marriage, to Martha Southall Cooke (1870-1894), was childless. Cooke married Sarah Katharine Grosh in 1898; this second marriage produced three children, including Cooke's second son John Warren Cooke. In his retirement, Cooke was granted various honors consistent with his status as an ordained minister and survivor of the senior Southern officer corps. He was named chaplain general of the Confederate Memorial Association and assistant chaplain general of the United Confederate Veterans. He made himself available for interviews, by historians such as Douglas Southall Freeman, as a living link to General Robert E. Lee and Lee's military staff and inner circle.

Cooke kept a diary throughout the Civil War, and also compiled various personal papers. These resources have been deposited in the Virginia Historical Society in Richmond.
