= Thomas W. Ozlin =

American lawyer and politician

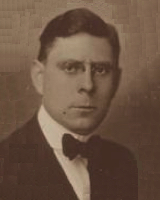

Member of the Virginia State Corporation Commission
- In office April 17, 1933 – July 14, 1944
- Preceded by: George C. Peery
- Succeeded by: Robert O. Norris Jr.

44th Speaker of the Virginia House of Delegates
- In office January 13, 1926 – January 8, 1930
- Preceded by: Richard L. Brewer Jr.
- Succeeded by: J. Sinclair Brown

Member of the Virginia House of Delegates from Lunenburg County
- In office January 9, 1918 – January 8, 1930
- Preceded by: Stephen H. Love
- Succeeded by: William E. Nelson

Mayor of Kenbridge, Virginia

Personal details
- Born: Thomas William Ozlin; July 12, 1884 Lunenburg County, Virginia, U.S.
- Died: July 14, 1944 (aged 60) Richmond, Virginia, U.S.
- Party: Democratic
- Spouse(s): Letty Lassiter Hobgood; Virginia Masten
- Education: Richmond College (BA, LLB)
- Profession: lawyer, politician

Thomas William Ozlin (July 12, 1884 – July 14, 1944) was a Virginia lawyer and politician. A member of the Byrd Organization, he represented Lunenburg County in the Virginia House of Delegates (1918-1930), and served as that body's Speaker from 1926 until 1930.

== Early life and education ==
Born in Lunenberg County to the former Emma (Mollie) Andrews, he was named after his farmer father, William Thomas Ozlin. The large family included an older sister who had become schoolteacher by 1900, as well as an older brother, and several younger brothers and sisters. After studying in the Lunenberg County public schools and at LaCrosse Academy in nearby Mecklenburg County, Ozlin went to Richmond for further studies at the Richmond College and its Law School, receiving an A.B. degree, then an LL.B. in 1909.

In 1914, he married Letty Lassiter Hobgood of Winston-Salem, North Carolina, but she died 10 years later giving birth to their daughter Rebecca, who died as an infant. He remarried to the widow Virginia Masten, daughter of a former Virginia Railway executive, who survived him by decades.

== Career ==
Ozlin taught for a year at the Fork Union Military Academy, then after becoming a member of the Virginia Bar in 1909, Ozlin began his legal career, which he classified as a general practice. He also was active in his Baptist Church, the American Bar Association and the Virginia State Bar, as well as fraternal organizations including the Masons, Shriners, Junior Order United American Mechanics, O.D.K.

Active in politics and the local Democratic Party, he served two terms as Kenbridge's mayor. He also won election as Lunenberg County's representative in the Virginia House of Delegates in 1917, and won re-election many times until 1930. In 1926, fellow delegates elected him as their Speaker, and he remained such until 1930. William E. Nelson succeeded him as Lunenberg County's delegate and J. Sinclair Brown of Roanoke succeeded him as Speaker.

Following Ozlin's decision not to run for re-election and the legislature's removal of the (paid) executive secretary of Virginia's Conservation and Development Commission, its popular (unpaid), chairman Will Carson blocked Ozlin from succeeding to that post. Instead, after the Democratic Party's sweeping victory in 1932, legislators elected Ozlin as a member of the State Corporation Commission (essentially a state judicial post), and he served until his death. A member of the Byrd Organization, he was a political ally of Virginia Governor then U.S. Senator Harry F. Byrd Sr.

== Death and legacy ==
Ozlin died in 1944, survived by his widow. He was buried at the Kenbridge Heights cemetery.
