= Harry R. Houston =

American politician (1878–1960)

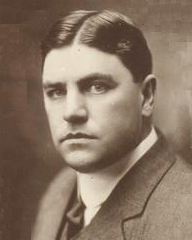

42nd Speaker of the Virginia House of Delegates
- In office January 12, 1916 – January 14, 1920
- Preceded by: Edwin P. Cox
- Succeeded by: Richard L. Brewer, Jr.

Member of the Virginia House of Delegates for Elizabeth City and Hampton
- In office February 28, 1923 – January 13, 1926
- Preceded by: Nelson S. Groome
- Succeeded by: G. Alvin Massenburg

Member of the Virginia House of Delegates from Elizabeth City County
- In office January 10, 1906 – January 14, 1920
- Preceded by: C. L. Collier
- Succeeded by: Nelson S. Groome

Personal details
- Born: Harry Rutherford Houston; May 20, 1878 Fincastle, Virginia, U.S.
- Died: November 13, 1960 (aged 82) Hampton, Virginia, U.S.
- Party: Democratic
- Spouse: Elizabeth Egerton Watkins
- Education: Hampden-Sydney College

Harry Rutherford Houston (May 20, 1878 – November 13, 1960) was a Virginia politician. He represented Elizabeth City County in the Virginia House of Delegates, and served as that body's Speaker from 1916 until 1920.
