= Richard L. Brewer Jr. =

American politician

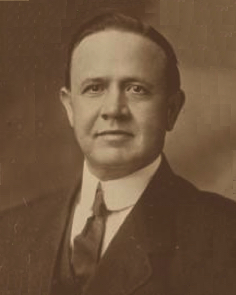

43rd Speaker of the Virginia House of Delegates
- In office January 14, 1920 – January 13, 1926
- Preceded by: Harry R. Houston
- Succeeded by: Thomas W. Ozlin

Member of the Virginia House of Delegates for Nansemond and Suffolk City
- In office January 10, 1912 – January 10, 1934
- Preceded by: Junius E. West
- Succeeded by: G. Ashton Harris

Personal details
- Born: Richard Lewis Brewer Jr. May 27, 1864 Prince George County, Virginia, U.S.
- Died: April 5, 1947 (aged 82) Suffolk, Virginia, U.S.
- Party: Democratic
- Education: Suffolk Military Institute

Richard Lewis Brewer Jr. (May 27, 1864 – April 5, 1947) was a Virginia politician. He represented Nansemond County in the Virginia House of Delegates, and served as that body's Speaker from 1920 until 1926.

In 1924 Brewer's nomination was seconded by Sarah Lee Fain, one of the first two female members of the Virginia House of Delegates; upon her recognition from the floor she received over a minute's worth of cheers and applause.

Brewer advised the Equal Suffrage League on suffrage strategy. He predicted that an amendment to the state constitution had a better chance to pass than the proposed 19th amendment to the federal constitution and urged the League to help introduce such an amendment.

== See also ==
- List of mayors of Suffolk, Virginia
