= Thomas B. Stanley =

American politician (1890–1970)

Thomas Stanley
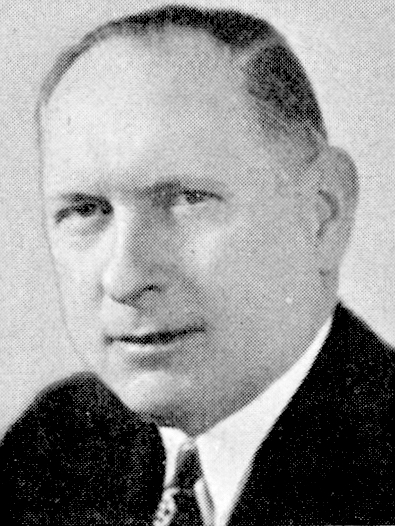

57th Governor of Virginia
- In office January 20, 1954 – January 11, 1958
- Lieutenant: Allie Edward Stakes Stephens
- Preceded by: John S. Battle
- Succeeded by: J. Lindsay Almond

Chair of the National Governors Association
- In office June 24, 1956 – June 23, 1957
- Preceded by: Arthur B. Langlie
- Succeeded by: William Stratton

Member of the U.S. House of Representatives from Virginia's 5th district
- In office November 5, 1946 – February 3, 1953
- Preceded by: Thomas G. Burch
- Succeeded by: William M. Tuck

47th Speaker of the Virginia House of Delegates
- In office January 14, 1942 – November 5, 1946
- Preceded by: Ashton Dovell
- Succeeded by: G. Alvin Massenburg

Member of the Virginia House of Delegates from the Henry and Martinsville district
- In office January 8, 1930 – November 5, 1946
- Preceded by: Sallie C. Booker
- Succeeded by: Willey R. Broaddus

Personal details
- Born: Thomas Bahnson Stanley; July 16, 1890 Spencer, Virginia, U.S.
- Died: July 10, 1970 (aged 79) Stanleytown, Virginia, U.S.
- Party: Democratic
- Spouse: Anne Bassett
- Children: 3
- Education: Eastman Business College

Thomas Bahnson Stanley (July 16, 1890 – July 10, 1970) was an American politician, furniture manufacturer, and Holstein cattle breeder. A Democrat and member of the Byrd Organization, Stanley served in a number of different political offices in Virginia, including as the 47th speaker of the Virginia House of Delegates and as the Commonwealth's 57th governor. He became known for his support of the Massive Resistance strategy to prevent school desegregation mandated by the United States Supreme Court's decisions in Brown v. Board of Education, and Virginia's attempt to circumvent those decisions (ultimately overturned by both the Virginia Supreme Court and by federal courts) was known as the Stanley Plan.

== Early life ==
He was born to Crockett Stanley (January 8, 1838 – March 12, 1915) and Susan Matilda Walker (August 17, 1845 – April 9, 1922) on a farm near Spencer, Henry County, Virginia, the youngest of seven children. He married Anne Pocahontas Bassett (November 28, 1898 – October 20, 1979) on October 24, 1918, in Bassett, Virginia. Anne was the daughter of John David Bassett (July 14, 1866 – February 26, 1965), a founder of Bassett Furniture, and Nancy Pocahontas Hundley (November 21, 1862 – January 11, 1953). Stanley graduated from Eastman Business College in Poughkeepsie, New York, in 1912.

== Business ==
Stanley worked for his father-in-law's company, Bassett Furniture, as an executive until 1924, when he left and founded Stanley Furniture, a leading Virginia furniture maker, in what would become Stanleytown, Virginia. His sons Thomas Bahnson Stanley, Jr. and John David Stanley joined him at Stanley Furniture.

== Politics ==
As the Great Depression began, Henry County voters elected Stanley to represent them (part time) in the Virginia House of Delegates. Re-elected multiple times, he served from 1930 to 1946, and fellow delegates elected him their speaker from 1942 to 1946. After the end of World War II, voters elected Stanley to the U.S. House of Representatives, where he represented Virginia's 5th district from November 5, 1946, until February 3, 1953, when Stanley resigned on to run for Virginia's governor. Fellow Byrd Organization loyalist and former Virginia Governor William M. Tuck succeeded to the seat.

Stanley's turn as a federal representative was facilitated by the appointment of Democratic incumbent Thomas Burch to take an interim appointment to the U.S. Senate seat vacated by the death of Carter Glass. Stanley handily won the primary over another legislator. This constituted election to the 79th Congress, but that body having adjourned, Stanley was not sworn in until the start of the 80th Congress in 1947, which was won without Republican opposition. He was nominated without opposition and elected to the subsequent three congresses without a Republican opponent. Stanley achieved chairship of a standing committee in only his third term, though only the housekeeping Committee on House Administration.

The Byrd Organization, having turned him aside three times since 1941, finally selected Stanley to be the Democratic candidate for governor of Virginia in 1953. He resigned from the House one month after beginning his fourth term. He won the Democratic primary. In the general election, Stanley handily defeated Republican Theodore Roosevelt Dalton and Independent Howard Carwile. He served as the governor of Virginia from 1954 to 1958. As governor, Stanley improved the administration of state hospitals and increased funding to mental hospitals and public schools.

While governor, Stanley became embroiled in conflict. The budget fight between the Old Guard of the Byrd Organization and the Young Turks (many returning military veterans) over budget surpluses and historic underfunding of education (especially egregious with respect to non-white Virginians) in the 1954 legislative session affected relations in the state's Democratic Party for a generation. Stanley supported segregation, and the United States Supreme Court declared such illegal twice in Brown v. Board of Education (which included a companion case from Prince Edward County, Virginia). After the 1954 Brown decision, Governor Stanley appointed a committee of mainly politicians from Southside Virginia (historically over-represented in the Virginia General Assembly and which depended politically on various methods of disenfranchising non-white Virginians) to study ways to preserve segregation through legislative means, including a school voucher program. Meanwhile, U.S. Senator Harry F. Byrd declared the strategy known as Massive Resistance, while Richmond News Leader publisher James J. Kilpatrick advocated a more drastic policy, which passed a special legislative session in 1956 and became known as the Stanley Plan. Most parts were declared illegal by Virginia and federal courts within three years, long after Governor Stanley's term had ended. In fact, although Governor Stanley had vowed to close schools to prevent their desegregation, that aspect of the plan was first tested under the next governor, J. Lindsay Almond after a federal panel ordered desegregation of Charlottesville schools in 1958.

=== Electoral history ===
- 1946; Stanley was elected to the U.S. House of Representatives and concurrently won a general election to the seat with 75.4% and 73.52% respectively in both races, defeating Republican William Creasy in both races.
- 1948; Stanley was re-elected with 99.53% of the vote, defeating Independent Gene Graybeal.
- 1950; Stanley was re-elected unopposed.
- 1952; Stanley was re-elected unopposed.
- 1953; Stanley was elected Governor of Virginia with 54.76% of the vote, defeating Republican Theodore R. Dalton and Independent Howard Hearness Carwile.

== Later years ==
After his gubernatorial term ended, Stanley resumed his oversight of the furniture business, as well as became vice president and director of the First National Bank, and chairman of the Commission on State and Local Revenues and Expenditures.

== Death ==
Stanley died in Martinsville, Virginia, on July 10, 1970, and is buried in Roselawn Burial Park. His home Stoneleigh was listed on the National Register of Historic Places in 1982.

U.S. House of Representatives
Preceded by Thomas G. Burch	Member of the U.S. House of Representatives from Virginia's 5th congressional district 1946–1953	Succeeded by William M. Tuck
Party political offices
Preceded by John S. Battle	Democratic nominee for Governor of Virginia; 1953	Succeeded by J. Lindsay Almond
Political offices
Preceded by John S. Battle	Governor of Virginia; 1954–1958	Succeeded by J. Lindsay Almond
Preceded by Arthur B. Langlie	Chair of the National Governors Association; 1956–1957	Succeeded by William Stratton
