= A. B. Philpott =

American politician (1858–1916)

Member of the Virginia House of Delegates from Henry County
- In office January 14, 1914 – January 12, 1916
- Preceded by: George L. Richardson
- Succeeded by: John W. Ramsey

Personal details
- Born: Albert Buchanan Philpott; December 21, 1858; Henry County, Virginia, U.S.
- Died: September 22, 1916 (aged 57); Philpott, Virginia, U.S.
- Political party: Democratic
- Spouse: Mary Elizabeth Farner
- Children: 4
- Relatives: A. L. Philpott (grandson)
- Occupation: Shopkeeper; preacher

Albert Buchanan Philpott (December 21, 1858 – September 22, 1916) was an American shopkeeper and Baptist minister who founded the community of Philpott, Virginia. A lifelong resident of Henry County, Virginia, he represented the county in the Virginia House of Delegates during its 1914 session. His grandson, A. L. Philpott (1919–1991), was elected to the house approximately four decades later and eventually rose to become speaker of that body.

Virginia House of Delegates
Preceded by	Member of the Virginia House of Delegates from Henry County; 1914–1916	Succeeded by John W. Ramsey
