= Philpott, Virginia =

Unincorporated community in Virginia, United States

Philpott
- Unincorporated area
- Interactive map of Philpott
- Coordinates: 36°47′25″N 80°00′22″W
- Country: United States
- State: Virginia
- County: Henry
- Named for: A. B. Philpott
- Elevation: 797 ft (243 m)
- Time zone: UTC-5:00 (EST)
  - Summer (DST): UTC-4:00 (EDT)
- Area code: 276

Philpott is an unincorporated community in Henry County, in the U.S. state of Virginia.

== History ==
The community is named for A. B. Philpott, who operated a general store there for many years. A post office called Philpott was established in 1900, and remained in operation until it was discontinued in 1958.

== Notable person ==
A. B. Philpott's grandson, politician A. L. Philpott, was born in Philpott.
