= 2005 Virginia House of Delegates election =

2005 Virginia House of Delegates elections
- November 8, 2005

All 100 seats in the Virginia House of Delegates 51 seats needed for a majority
- Turnout: 45.0% ▲
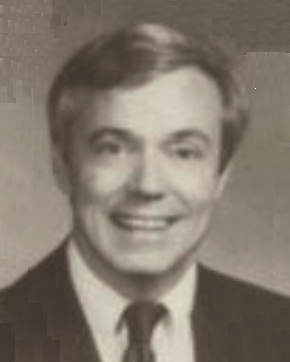

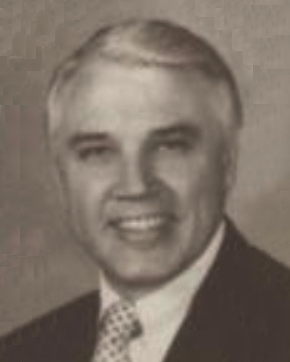
	Majority party	Minority party
Leader	Bill Howell	Frank Hall
Party	Republican	Democratic
Leader since	January 8, 2003	January 9, 2002
Leader's seat	28th	69th
Last election	61	37
Seats before	60	38
Seats won	57	40
Seat change	▼3	▲2
Popular vote	979,209	640,958
Percentage	56.1%	36.7%
Swing	▼1.6%	▼0.3%
- Results: Republican hold Republican gain Democratic hold Democratic gain Independent hold Independent gain
Speaker before election
Bill Howell
Republican
Elected Speaker
Bill Howell
Republican

The Virginia House of Delegates election of 2005 was held on Tuesday, November 8.

== Results ==
=== Overview ===
↓
57	40	3
Republican	Democratic

Parties		Candidates	Seats				Popular Vote		
Parties		Candidates	2003	2005	+/-	Strength	Vote	%	Change
	Republican		61	57	▼4	58.00%	979,209	56.11%	
	Democratic		37	40	▲3	39.00%	640,958	36.73%	
	Independent		2	3	▲1	3.00%	83,908	4.81%	
	Libertarian		0	0	Steady	0.00%	11,302	0.65%	
	Independent Greens		0	0	Steady	0.00%	1,664	0.10%	
-	Write-ins		0	0	Steady	0.00%	28,031	1.61%	
Total			100	100	0	100.00%	1,745,072	100.00%	-

== See also ==
- 2005 United States elections
- 2005 Virginia elections
  - 2005 Virginia gubernatorial election
  - 2005 Virginia lieutenant gubernatorial election
  - 2005 Virginia Attorney General election
