= George L. Richardson =

American politician

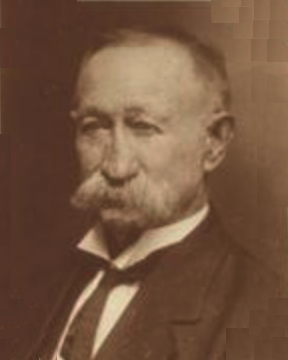
- Official portrait, 1912

Member of the Virginia House of Delegates from Henry County
- In office January 10, 1912 – January 14, 1914
- Preceded by: J. B. Bassett
- Succeeded by: A. B. Philpott
- In office January 8, 1908 – January 12, 1910
- Preceded by: J. M. Barker Jr.
- Succeeded by: J. B. Bassett

Personal details
- Born: George Lafayette Richardson; November 9, 1843
- Died: June 7, 1914 (aged 70)
- Party: Democratic
- Spouse: Mary Dyer (m. 1874)

Military service
- Allegiance: Confederate States
- Branch/service: Confederate States Army
- Rank: Second lieutenant
- Unit: 42nd Virginia Infantry
- Battles/wars: American Civil War

George Lafayette Richardson (November 9, 1843 – June 7, 1914) was an American politician who served in the Virginia House of Delegates.
