= Ford C. Quillen =

American attorney and politician from Virginia (1938–2026)

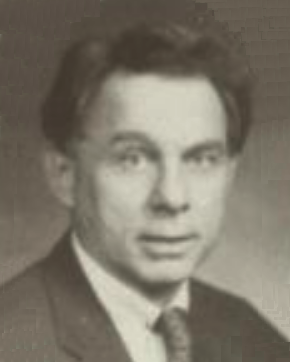
- Official portrait, 1988

Speaker of the Virginia House of Delegates
- Acting; September 28, 1991 – November 19, 1991
- Preceded by: A. L. Philpott
- Succeeded by: Tom Moss

Member of the Virginia House of Delegates
- In office January 14, 1970 – January 12, 1994 Serving with George Stuart (1970–1972); Orby L. Cantrell (1972–1982)
- Preceded by: Joseph P. Johnson
- Succeeded by: Terry Kilgore
- Constituency: 62nd district (1970–1972); 1st district (1972–1994)

Personal details
- Born: Ford Carter Quillen; September 21, 1938 Gate City, Virginia, U.S.
- Died: January 16, 2026 (aged 87) Kingsport, Tennessee, U.S.
- Party: Democratic
- Spouse: Barbara Gail Burdette
- Education: University of Tennessee (BS, LLB)

Military service
- Branch/service: United States Army

Ford Carter Quillen (September 21, 1938 – January 18, 2026) was an American attorney and Democratic Party politician.

A native of Gate City in Scott County, Virginia, Quillen was first elected to the Virginia House of Delegates in 1969, where he continued to serve until his decision to retire and not seek reelection in 1993.

When Speaker A. L. Philpott stepped down due to poor health in 1991, Quillen, as Chair of the House Privileges and Elections Committee, became his temporary replacement until Tom Moss's election in November.

Quillen was the grandfather of three-time NBA Slam Dunk Contest champion Mac McClung. He died in Kingsport, Tennessee, on January 18, 2026, at the age of 87.
