= G. Steven Agee =

American judge (born 1952)

Steven Agee
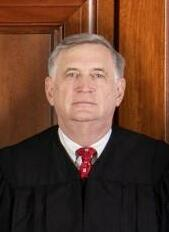
- Agee in 2022

Judge of the United States Court of Appeals for the Fourth Circuit
- Incumbent
- Assumed office July 1, 2008
- Appointed by: George W. Bush
- Preceded by: J. Michael Luttig

Justice of the Virginia Supreme Court
- In office March 1, 2003 – June 30, 2008
- Preceded by: Harry L. Carrico
- Succeeded by: LeRoy F. Millette Jr.

Judge of the Virginia Court of Appeals
- In office January 1, 2001 – March 1, 2003
- Preceded by: Sam Coleman
- Succeeded by: Elizabeth A. McClanahan

Member of the Virginia House of Delegates
- In office January 13, 1982 – January 12, 1994 Serving with Richard Cranwell until 1983
- Preceded by: Raymond Robrecht
- Succeeded by: Morgan Griffith
- Constituency: 7th district (1982–1983); 15th district (1983–1992); 8th district (1992–1994)

Personal details
- Born: George Steven Agee; November 12, 1952 (age 73) Roanoke, Virginia, U.S.
- Party: Republican
- Spouse: Nancy Howell
- Education: Bridgewater College (BA); University of Virginia (JD); New York University (LLM)

Military service
- Branch/service: United States Army; Army Reserve
- Years of service: 1986–1997
- Rank: Captain
- Unit: J.A.G. Corps

George Steven Agee (born November 12, 1952) is a United States circuit judge of the United States Court of Appeals for the Fourth Circuit and a former justice of the Supreme Court of Virginia.

== Background ==
Born in Roanoke, Virginia, Agee was educated at Bridgewater College (Bachelor of Arts), the University of Virginia School of Law (Juris Doctor) and New York University School of Law (Master of Laws, Taxation). He has litigated cases in Virginia and federal courts, including arguing for the appellant before the Supreme Court of the United States in Patterson v. Shumate, 504 U.S. 753 (1992).

From 1982 to 1994, he served in the Virginia House of Delegates. Opting to pursue the Republican nomination for Attorney General of Virginia in 1993, he did not seek re-election to the House.

== Judicial career ==
=== State judicial service ===
In 2001, he became a Judge of the Virginia Court of Appeals. In 2003, he was elevated to the Virginia Supreme Court, filling the vacancy created by Chief Justice Harry L. Carrico, who took Senior Justice status.

=== Federal judicial service ===
Agee was nominated on March 13, 2008 by President George W. Bush to fill a vacancy on the Fourth Circuit created by Judge J. Michael Luttig, who resigned on May 10, 2006. President Bush asked the Senate to consider his nomination swiftly because of the court’s heavy caseloads, and because five of the fifteen seats were vacant. Agee received a hearing before the Senate Judiciary Committee on May 1, 2008, and was unanimously voted out of committee on May 15, 2008. Agee was confirmed on May 20, 2008, by a 96–0 vote. He received his commission on July 1, 2008, and was sworn in by his colleague and former law professor, United States Circuit Judge James Harvie Wilkinson III, on July 2, 2008.

=== Notable rulings ===
- In 2016, Agee found that sectarian prayers offered by Rowan County, North Carolina commissioners at their meetings did not violate the Establishment Clause of the United States Constitution, over the dissent of Judge Wilkinson. That judgment was then rejected by the full circuit en banc by a vote of 10-5, with Wilkinson now writing for the majority while Agee and Paul V. Niemeyer authored dissents. In June 2018, the Supreme Court of the United States denied review, over the written dissent of Justice Clarence Thomas joined by Neil Gorsuch.

Legal offices
Preceded by J. Michael Luttig	Judge of the United States Court of Appeals for the Fourth Circuit; 2008–present	Incumbent
