= Joseph S. Denny =

American politician (1887–1932)

Member of the Virginia House of Delegates for Clarke, Frederick, and Winchester
- In office January 11, 1928 – August 11, 1932
- Preceded by: Robert T. Barton Jr.
- Succeeded by: E. Blackburn Moore

Member of the Virginia Senate from the 26th district
- In office January 13, 1926 – January 11, 1928
- Preceded by: Harry F. Byrd
- Succeeded by: Richard S. Wright

Personal details
- Born: Joseph Siegel Denny; October 29, 1870
- Died: August 11, 1932 (aged 61); White Post, Virginia, U.S.
- Political party: Democratic

Joseph Siegel Denny (October 29, 1870 – August 11, 1932) was an American politician. A member of the Democratic Party, he served a partial term in the Virginia Senate, succeeding Harry F. Byrd, when Byrd took office as governor. Denny was subsequently elected to three terms in the Virginia House of Delegates, serving until his death.
