= Alice Jackson Stuart =

American educator (1913–2001)

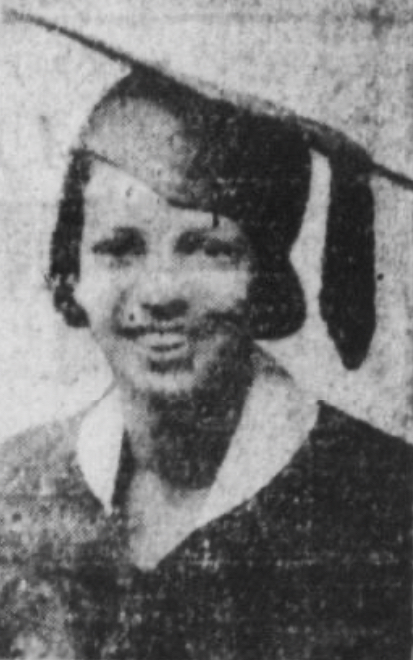
- Graduation photo of Stuart, from a 1935 publication
- Born: June 2, 1913; Richmond, Virginia, U.S.
- Died: June 13, 2001 (aged 88)
- Education: Virginia Union University; Columbia University
- Occupation: Educator
- Known for: First Black woman to apply for graduate school admission at the University of Virginia
- Relatives: James E. Jackson (brother)

Alice Carlotta Jackson Stuart (June 2, 1913 – June 13, 2001) was an American educator who was the first African-American woman to apply for graduate school studies at the University of Virginia. She was denied on the basis of "good and sufficient reasons" and later went on to earn her Master of Arts at Columbia University in 1937.

== Biography ==
Alice Jackson was born on June 2, 1913, in Richmond, Virginia, to pharmacist James Jackson and Clara Kersey Jackson. With three siblings, her brother was Communist Party USA official James E. Jackson. Stuart was born to college-educated parents who could afford to send her to college. As a result, Stuart attended Virginia Union University, where she graduated with a Bachelor of Arts in English. During her time studying as an undergraduate, Stuart was a part of Virginia State College's Delta Sigma Theta chapter.

In August 1935, Stuart became the first African-American woman to apply to the University of Virginia (UVa) for graduate studies. She was denied based upon the Jim Crow educational policies that existed during the time. The school board refused to explain the "good and sufficient reasons" for which she was denied entry. She later went on to attend Columbia University with the grant money she received from the Dovell Act. Stuart graduated in 1937 from Columbia University with a master of Arts degree in English. In an interview with her only son, Julian Towns Houston, Julian described his mother as "in some ways a larger than life figure… devoted to education, loved teaching, loved her students".

After graduating from Columbia University, Stuart went on to work at Bethune-Cookman College, Howard College, as well as many high schools. She was awarded a fellowship by the Ford Foundation which allowed her to travel around the country. Stuart died on June 13, 2001, aged 88, a week after her grandson graduated from Harvard University.

== Influences ==
After Stuart's application had been rejected by the University of Virginia, it became a controversial issue among the public. It caught the attention of some African-American and student organizations in Virginia. The case even brought significant changes to the educational policies towards African-American students of the State of Virginia at that time.

After being "rejected respectfully" by the University of Virginia on her application for studying a Master of Arts in French, Stuart tried to seek advice and assistance from the NAACP. It is an organization which aims "to ensure the political, educational, social, and economic equality of rights of all persons and to eliminate race-based discrimination". The NAACP "had threatened court action in an effort to compel the University of Virginia to admit a Negro graduate student".

The National Student League (NSL) wrote a highly publicized letter to the Board of Visitors of the University of Virginia and President John Newcomb condemning their action. The students protested the Board's action "because it implies the desirability of continuing educational inequality". In order to address the case, the NSL scheduled an open forum for students to discuss this controversial issue. This act put pressure to the University of Virginia because the President received half a dozen of similar letters from other NSL university branches.

Despite the fact that racial segregation was still a common phenomenon in the United States in 1930s, the rejection of Stuart's application to the University of Virginia was controversial enough to push forward some changes in the State of Virginia. The State started to provide African-American citizens with access to separate-but-equal higher education facilities. In 1935 December, the Virginia State Board of Education announced the setting up of a graduate department for African Americans at Virginia State University in Petersburg. It was the first graduate school for African Americans in Virginia. A resolution adopted by the State Board at its meeting read: "…it is recognized that such opportunities should be provided for the Negros".

Another change came in February 1936 in the Virginia General Assembly. It passed House Bill 470, the Dovell Act, which promised to pay qualified black applicants the additional amount of tuition and travel expenses required to attend school outside the state offering a similar course of study. The bill provided for the education of hundreds of African-American students over the next 20–30 years. Because of the Act, Gregory Swanson broke the color barrier in 1950 and became the first African American student at the University of Virginia Law School.

== Legacy ==
Several months after Alice Jackson got rejected from UVa, the Virginia State Board of Education created a graduate school for African Americans at Virginia State University in Petersburg in 1935. The following year, the Virginia General Assembly passed the Dovell Act (House Bill 470). This paid qualified black applicants' tuition and travel expenses to attend schools outside the state. In the 1980s, University of Virginia and African-American students at the school honored her. Shortly after her death in 2001, the Virginia Senate approved Joint Resolution No. 40 to honor Jackson.

Though Jackson's actions were important in the long process of desegregation at the University of Virginia, the first African-American student was not accepted at the graduate level until Gregory Swanson in 1950. Afterwards, African-American students were slowly accepted at the graduate and undergraduate level.

She was the sister-in-law of civil rights activist Esther Cooper Jackson.

In 2012 Jackson was posthumously honored as one of the Library of Virginia's "Virginia Women in History" for her life's work.
