= 1993 Virginia Attorney General election =

- November 2, 1993
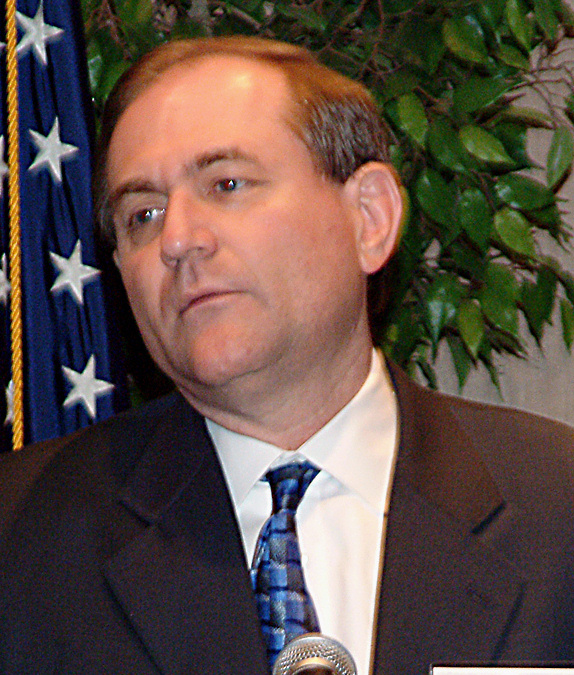

Nominee	Jim Gilmore	William Dolan
Party	Republican	Democratic
Popular vote	958,982	749,565
Percentage	56.1%	43.9%
- Gilmore: 50–60% 60–70% 70–80% Dolan: 50–60% 60–70%
Attorney General before election
Stephen D. Rosenthal
Democratic
Elected Attorney General
Jim Gilmore
Republican

The 1993 Virginia Attorney General election was held on November 2, 1993, to elect the next attorney general of Virginia. The Republican nominee, Jim Gilmore, defeated the Democratic nominee, William Dolan, by around 12 percent.

== General election ==
=== Candidates ===
- Jim Gilmore (R)
- William Dolan (D)

=== Results ===
1993 Virginia Attorney General election
Party	Candidate	Votes	%
Republican	Jim Gilmore	958,982	56.1
Democratic	William Dolan	749,565	43.9
Write-in		370	0.02%
Total votes		1,708,917	100.0
Republican hold			
