= 2005 Virginia elections =

- November 8, 2005

A general election was held in the U.S. state of Virginia on November 8, 2005. The positions of governor, lieutenant governor, attorney general, and the House of Delegates were up for election. Primary elections were held on June 14, 2005.

Absentee voting began on September 26, 2005, while early voting was not yet established.

The Republican Party flipped control of the lieutenant governor's office, while Democrats' gubernatorial win prevented a Republican trifecta in Virginia's government.

== Governor ==
Incumbent Democratic Governor Mark Warner was ineligible to run for re-election, as the Constitution of Virginia prohibits its governors from serving consecutive terms. Lieutenant Governor Tim Kaine and Attorney General Jerry Kilgore were the Democratic and Republican nominees respectively. Kaine defeated Kilgore by 5.78%.

== Lieutenant governor ==
Incumbent Democratic Lieutenant Governor Tim Kaine did not run for reelection to a second term and instead ran for governor. State Senator Bill Bolling and State Senator Leslie Byrne were the Republican and Democratic nominees respectively. Bolling defeated Byrne by 1.2%.

== Attorney general ==
Incumbent Republican Attorney General Jerry Kilgore did not run for reelection and instead ran for governor. State Senator Bob McDonnell and State Senator Creigh Deeds were the Republican and Democratic nominees respectively. McDonnell defeated Deeds by 0.02%.

== House of Delegates ==
All 100 House of Delegates seats were up for election. Republicans' 60–38 majority decreased to a 57–40 majority.
