= Ashton Dovell =

American politician

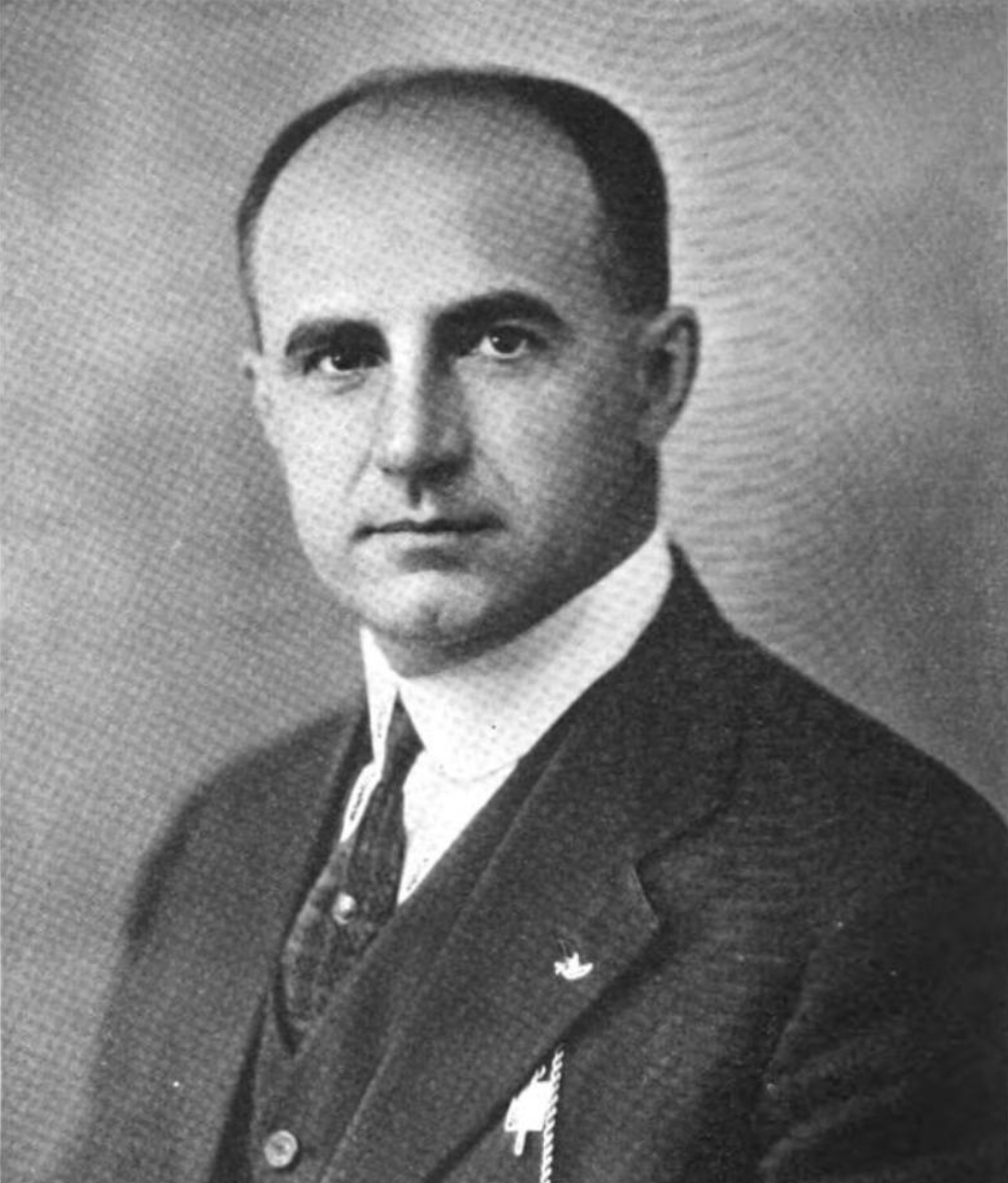

46th Speaker of the Virginia House of Delegates
- In office January 8, 1936 – January 14, 1942
- Preceded by: J. Sinclair Brown
- Succeeded by: Thomas B. Stanley

Member of the Virginia House of Delegates for New Kent, Charles City, James City, York, and Williamsburg
- In office January 9, 1924 – January 14, 1942
- Preceded by: Norvell L. Henley
- Succeeded by: Paul W. Crockett

Personal details
- Born: Grover Ashton Dovell; June 8, 1885 Madison, Virginia, U.S.
- Died: October 28, 1949 (aged 64) Richmond, Virginia, U.S.
- Party: Democratic
- Spouse: Martha Lane (m. 1911)
- Education: University of Virginia; College of William & Mary
- Profession: Lawyer
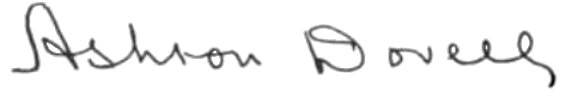
- Signature

Military service
- Allegiance: United States
- Battles/wars: World War I

Grover Ashton Dovell (June 8, 1885 – October 28, 1949) was an American politician and lawyer. A Democrat, he served in the Virginia House of Delegates from 1924 to 1942 and served as its Speaker from 1936 to 1942.

== Early life ==
Dovell was born in Madison County, Virginia to Early Beauregard and Lucy Bond Dovell. He received a B.A. degree from the University of Virginia and a LL.D from the Marshall-Wythe School of Law, after which he settled in Williamsburg, Virginia to practice law. He served for a time as city attorney of Williamsburg.

On February 28, 1911, Dovell married Martha Lane at Bruton Parish Church in Williamsburg.

Dovell served in World War I, and afterward was active in the American Legion.

Dovell was the first president of the Rotary Club of Williamsburg, Virginia, chartered on 18 October 1924.

== Political career ==
Dovell was elected in 1923 to a House of Delegates district that included Williamsburg and four neighboring counties on the Virginia Peninsula. He became Speaker in 1936. His House career ended in early 1942.

He was named a trustee of Colonial Williamsburg, whose reconstruction began during his term.

Dovell was a presidential elector in 1932, and a delegate to the 1940 Democratic National Convention.

== Later years ==
Dovell served as president of the Virginia State Bar 1945–46.

He died in Richmond, Virginia October 28, 1949. He was interred at Cedar Grove Cemetery in Williamsburg.

== See also ==
- Dovell Act
