= 1997 Virginia Attorney General election =

- November 4, 1997
Nominee	Mark Earley	William Dolan
Party	Republican	Democratic
Popular vote	953,455	702,523
Percentage	57.5%	42.4%
- Earley: 50–60% 60–70% 70–80% Dolan: 50–60% 60–70%
Attorney General before election
Jim Gilmore
Republican
Elected Attorney General
Mark Earley
Republican

The 1997 Virginia Attorney General election was held on November 4, 1997, to elect the next attorney general of Virginia. The Republican nominee, Mark Earley, defeated the Democratic nominee, William Dolan by around 15 percent.

== General election ==
=== Candidates ===
- Mark Earley (R)
- William Dolan (D)

=== Results ===
1997 Virginia Attorney General election
Party	Candidate	Votes	%
Republican	Mark Earley	953,455	57.5
Democratic	William Dolan	702,523	42.4
Write-in		2393	0.14%
Total votes		1,658,371	100.0
Republican hold			
