= 1989 Virginia elections =

- November 5, 1989

In the November 5, 1989 general election, there were elections in the United States Commonwealth of Virginia for Governor, Lieutenant Governor, Attorney General, and all 100 seats in the House of Delegates.

== Lieutenant governor ==
=== Results ===
Virginia lieutenant gubernatorial election, 1985
Party	Candidate	Votes	%	±%
Democratic	L. Douglas Wilder	685,329	51.84%	−3.61%
Republican	John Chichester	636,695	48.16%	+3.65%
Write-ins		89	0.01%	
Majority		48,634	3.68%	−7.25%
Turnout		1,322,113		
Democratic hold		Swing		

== Attorney General ==
1989 Virginia Attorney General election
- November 7, 1989

Nominee	Mary Sue Terry	Buster O'Brien
Party	Democratic	Republican
Popular vote	814,808	512,169
Percentage	61.4%	38.6%
- Terry: 50–60% 60–70% 70–80% 80–90% O'Brien: 50–60%
Attorney General before election
Mary Sue Terry
Democratic
Elected Attorney General
Mary Sue Terry
Democratic

=== Candidates ===
- Mary Sue Terry, Virginia State Delegate and incumbent Attorney General (D)
- Buster O'Brien, attorney (R)

Virginia Attorney General election, 1989
Party	Candidate	Votes	%	±%
Democratic	Mary Sue Terry	814,808	61.40%	+10.44%
Republican	Buster O'Brien	512,169	38.59%	−10.41%
Write-ins		67	0.01%	
Majority		302,639	22.81%	+20.85%
Turnout		1,322,113		
Democratic hold		Swing		
