= Joseph P. Johnson =

American politician (1931–2022)

Member of the Virginia House of Delegates
- In office January 10, 1990 – January 8, 2014
- Preceded by: John C. Brown
- Succeeded by: Ben Chafin
- Constituency: 6th district (1990–1992); 4th district (1992–2014)
- In office January 12, 1966 – January 14, 1970 Serving with James B. Fugate
- Preceded by: J. Russell Moore
- Succeeded by: Ford C. Quillen
- Constituency: 63rd district

Personal details
- Born: Joseph Pickett Johnson Jr. December 12, 1931 Washington County, Virginia, U.S.
- Died: August 5, 2022 (aged 90)
- Party: Democratic
- Spouse: Mary Ann Allison (died 2022)
- Children: 3
- Education: Emory & Henry College (BA); University of Richmond (LLB)
- Occupation: Lawyer; politician

Military service
- Branch/service: United States Air Force
- Years of service: 1951–1955
- Battles/wars: Korean War

Joseph Pickett Johnson Jr. (December 12, 1931 – August 5, 2022) was an American lawyer and politician of the Democratic Party. He was a member of the Virginia House of Delegates from 1966 to 1969, and again from 1990 until 2014. He represented the 4th district in the southwest part of the state, including the city of Bristol and parts of Smyth and Washington Counties from 1992 to 2014.

Johnson ran unsuccessfully for the United States House of Representatives in 1968, losing the 9th congressional district race to the Republican incumbent, William C. Wampler.

Johnson announced that he would not run for reelection in 2013.

== Personal life ==
Johnson was married to the former Mary Ann Allison for 64 years, until her death on July 19, 2022. They had three children: Mary Jo (Neal), Joseph Pickett III, and Sage. Johnson died on August 5, 2022, aged 90, less than three weeks after his wife; six grandchildren: Mary Lewis Huffman (Neal), Ashley Brooke Hemmer (Johnson), Mary Catherine Clark (Johnson), Joseph Zachary Johnson, Finn Alexander Johnson, William Pickett Johnson; and three great grandchildren: Emma Grace Clark, Isley Ann Clark and Joseph Beckett Johnson.

== Electoral history ==
Date	Election	Candidate	Party	Votes	%
Virginia House of Delegates, Washington, Scott and Bristol city district
November 8, 1965	General	Joseph P Johnson Jr	Democratic	6,435	36.01
November 8, 1965	General	James B. Fugate	Democratic	5,491	30.72
November 8, 1965	General	Others (2)		5,946	32.27
November 8, 1965	General	J. Russell Moore retired; district switched from 1 Democratic, 1 Republican to 2 Democratic			
November 3, 1967	General	Joseph P Johnson Jr	Democratic	12,752	31.02
November 3, 1967	General	James B. Fugate	Democratic	10,334	25.14
November 3, 1967	General	Others (2)		18,025	43.85
U.S. House of Representatives, Virginia 9th congressional district
November 5, 1968	General	William C. Wampler	Republican	71,531	59.89
November 5, 1968	General	Joseph P Johnson Jr	Democratic	47,906	40.11
November 5, 1968	General	Incumbent won; seat stayed Republican			
Virginia House of Delegates, 6th district
November 3, 1989	General	Joseph P Johnson Jr	Democratic	8,603	57.98
November 3, 1989	General	C Randall Lowe	Republican	6,232	42.00
November 3, 1989	General	Write Ins		2	0.02
November 3, 1989	General	John C. Brown retired; seat switched from Republican to Democratic			
Virginia House of Delegates, 4th district
November 5, 1991	General	Joseph P Johnson Jr	Democratic	13,431	99.98
November 5, 1991	General	Write Ins		3	0.02
November 5, 1991	General	Jackie Stump was redistricted out; seat switched from independent to Democratic			
November 2, 1993	General	Joseph P Johnson Jr	Democratic	10,977	99.94
November 2, 1993	General	Write Ins		7	0.06
November 7, 1995	General	J P Johnson Jr	Democratic	11,413	99.96
November 7, 1995	General	Write Ins		5	0.04
November 4, 1997	General	J P Johnson Jr	Democratic	11,337	99.72
November 4, 1997	General	Write Ins		32	0.28
November 2, 1999	General	J P Johnson Jr	Democratic	10,221	99.84
November 2, 1999	General	Write Ins		16	0.16
November 6, 2001	General	J P Johnson Jr	Democratic	12,671	99.65
November 6, 2001	General	Write Ins		45	0.35
November 4, 2003	General	J P Johnson Jr	Democratic	8,595	99.77
November 4, 2003	General	Write Ins		20	0.23
November 8, 2005	General	J P Johnson Jr	Democratic	15,418	98.88
November 8, 2005	General	Write Ins		175	1.12
November 6, 2007	General	Joseph P. Johnson, Jr.	Democratic	10,583	99.19
November 6, 2007	General	Write Ins		86	0.18
November 3, 2009	General	Joseph P. Johnson, Jr.	Democratic	13,032	97.14
November 3, 2009	General	Write Ins		383	2.85
November 8, 2011	General	Joseph P. Johnson, Jr.	Democratic	14,487	98.53
November 8, 2011	General	Write Ins		216	1.46
