= Andy Guest =

American politician (1939–2001)

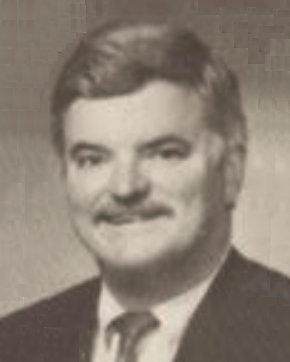

Member of the Virginia House of Delegates
- In office January 12, 1972 – January 12, 2000
- Preceded by: Flournoy L. Largent Jr.
- Succeeded by: Allen Louderback
- Constituency: 17th district (1972‍–‍1982); 18th district (1982‍–‍1983); 31st district (1983‍–‍1992); 15th district (1992‍–‍2000)

House Minority Leader
- In office December 3, 1985 – November 19, 1991
- Preceded by: Vince Callahan
- Succeeded by: Vance Wilkins

Personal details
- Born: Raymond Richard Guest Jr. September 29, 1939 New York, New York, U.S.
- Died: April 2, 2001 (aged 61) Front Royal, Virginia, U.S.
- Party: Republican
- Spouses: Patricia Hazard Donovan (m. 1962; div. 1971); Mary Scott Derrick
- Parent: Raymond R. Guest (father)
- Education: Yale University (BA)

Military service
- Branch/service: United States Marine Corps

Raymond Richard "Andy" Guest Jr. (September 29, 1939 – April 2, 2001) was an American politician. A Republican, he served as a member of the Virginia House of Delegates from 1972 to 2000 and was minority leader in that chamber from 1985 to 1991. He was the son of state senator and United States Ambassador to Ireland Raymond R. Guest. He died of cancer at his home in Front Royal, Virginia on April 2, 2001. Guest spent his childhood at Carter's Grove Plantation, built in 1755. A state park in Warren County near his residence, Shenandoah River Raymond R. "Andy" Guest Jr. State Park, was named in his honor in 1995.
