= Vance Wilkins =

American politician (born 1936)

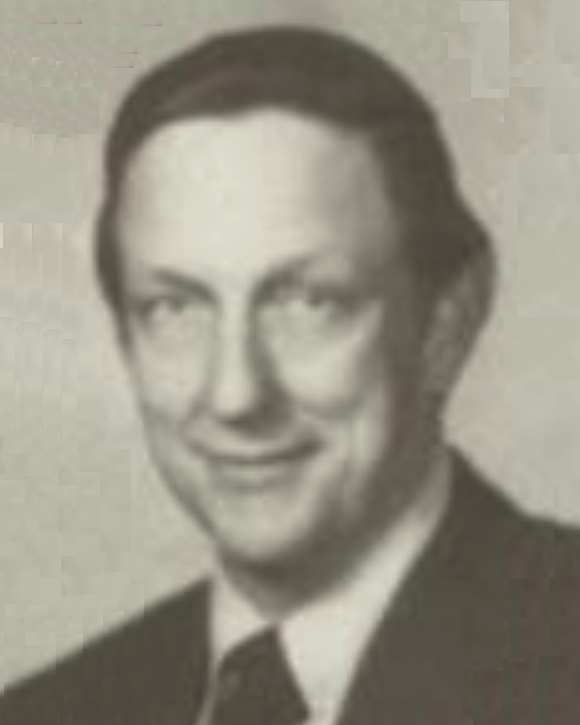
- Official portrait, 1978

53rd Speaker of the Virginia House of Delegates
- In office January 12, 2000 – June 15, 2002
- Preceded by: Tom Moss
- Succeeded by: Lacey Putney (acting)
Other leadership positions
House Minority Leader
In office November 19, 1991 – January 12, 2000
Preceded by	Andy Guest
Succeeded by	Richard Cranwell

Member of the Virginia House of Delegates
- In office January 11, 1978 – June 15, 2002
- Preceded by: Donald G. Pendleton
- Succeeded by: Ben Cline
- Constituency: 11th district (1978‍–‍1983); 24th district (1983‍–‍2002)

Personal details
- Born: Shirley Vance Wilkins Jr. August 12, 1936 (age 89) Amherst, Virginia, U.S.
- Party: Republican
- Spouse: Leona Elena Ehlert
- Education: Virginia Tech (BS)
- Occupation: General contractor

Military service
- Branch/service: United States Air Force
- Years of service: 1958–1960

Shirley Vance Wilkins Jr. (born August 12, 1936) is a retired American politician of the Republican Party. He was a member of the Virginia House of Delegates from 1978 to 2002. In 2000 he became the first-ever Republican Speaker of the Virginia House and first non-Democratic Speaker since the Readjuster Party controlled the House in the early 1880s.

Wilkins was considered the driving force in the expansion of Republican House membership in the 1980s and 1990s, especially after he became minority leader in 1992. In his first term as Speaker, he oversaw the redistricting of the House after the 2000 census that led to an increase in the Republican majority from 52 to 47 (1 independent) to 64–34 (2 independents) after the November 2001 election.

== Voting record ==
The Republican political record of Vance Wilkins is well-summarized by the Virginia state website: "Vance Wilkins was a strong conservative, working for lower taxes, right-to-work laws, and gun-ownership rights." Wilkins supported the Republican values of limited sex education and limited abortion, in a county – Amherst, Virginia – which had the highest teen pregnancy rate in the nation during his tenure.

== Eavesdropping scandal ==
In March 2002, Republican Party of Virginia Chairman Edmund Matricardi III (R) pled guilty to eavesdropping on a Democratic Party conference call. State Attorney General Jerry Kilgore (R) investigated, which expanded to include Speaker Vance Wilkins and his chief of staff, Claudia D. Tucker, who pled guilty, resigned, was fined $1,000 and given a year probation.

== Resignation due to sexual harassment accusations ==
In June 2002, executives of Wilkins' former construction company revealed that Wilkins had paid $100,000 to a former political staffer, Jennifer L. Thompson, to keep quiet about "unwelcome sexual advances" by Wilkins. Multiple women came forward subsequently, claiming similar harassment. Under pressure from Kilgore and his own Republican caucus, Wilkins resigned as Speaker a week later, and then resigned from the House shortly afterward.

== Notes ==
Virginia House of Delegates
Preceded by Donald G. Pendleton	Member of the Virginia House of Delegates from the 11th district January 11, 1978 – January 12, 1983	Succeeded by A. L. Philpott
Preceded by Mitchell Van Yahres; James B. Murray	Member of the Virginia House of Delegates from the 24th district January 12, 1983 – June 15, 2002	Succeeded by Ben Cline
Preceded by Andy Guest	Minority Leader of the Virginia House of Delegates; November 19, 1991 – January 12, 2000	Succeeded by Richard Cranwell
Political offices
Preceded by Tom Moss	Speaker of the Virginia House of Delegates; January 12, 2000 – June 15, 2002	Succeeded by Lacey Putney
