= Tom Moss (politician) =

American politician (1928–2015)

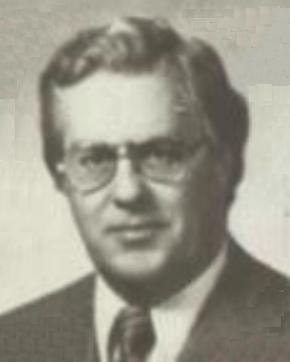

52nd Speaker of the Virginia House of Delegates
- In office November 19, 1991 – January 12, 2000
- Preceded by: Ford C. Quillen (acting)
- Succeeded by: Vance Wilkins
Other leadership positions
House Majority Leader
In office January 9, 1980 – November 19, 1991
Preceded by	A. L. Philpott
Succeeded by	Richard Cranwell

Member of the Virginia House of Delegates
- In office January 12, 1966 – January 1, 2002
- Preceded by: Theodore C. Pilcher
- Succeeded by: Mark Cole
- Constituency: 39th district (1966–1982); 37th district (1982–1983); 88th district (1983–2002)

Personal details
- Born: Thomas Warren Moss Jr. October 3, 1928 Norfolk, Virginia, U.S.
- Died: November 26, 2015 (aged 87) Greenville, South Carolina, U.S.
- Party: Democratic
- Spouse: Norma Moss
- Education: Virginia Tech (BS); University of Richmond (LLB)
- Occupation: Lawyer; politician

Military service
- Branch/service: United States Army
- Rank: First lieutenant
- Battles/wars: Korean War

Thomas Warren Moss Jr. (October 3, 1928 – November 26, 2015) was an American politician, most recently serving as the City Treasurer of Norfolk, a post to which he was elected in 2001. Prior to that, he served 36 years as a Democratic member of the Virginia House of Delegates, and was its Speaker 1991–2000.

== Early life ==
Moss received his bachelor's degree from the Virginia Polytechnic Institute. He served in the U.S. Army during the Korean War, attaining the rank of first lieutenant. Afterward, he attended the University of Richmond School of Law and set up a law office in his home town of Norfolk. He practiced law until his election as city treasurer in 2001.

== Political career ==
As a member of the Young Democratic Club of Norfolk, Moss was active in the 1960 presidential campaign of John F. Kennedy.

=== House of Delegates ===
In 1965 Moss ran for the Virginia House of Delegates as part of a racially mixed coalition of Democrats opposed to the pro-segregation state Democratic political machine of U.S. Senator Harry Flood Byrd, Sr. Running under the campaign slogan "get Norfolk out of the Byrd cage," Moss won his first election.

In 1980, when Speaker John Warren Cooke retired, House majority leader A. L. Philpott succeeded him and Moss was chosen as majority leader. Philpott, whose endorsement of Douglas Wilder's 1985 campaign for lieutenant governor helped pave the way for his election as governor in 1989, died of cancer in September 1991, shortly after announcing his retirement. Moss was elected Speaker on November 11, 1991.

Moss served one term as Speaker with a Democratic governor and state senate majority. Wilder was succeeded by two Republican governors, George Allen and Jim Gilmore, and the Senate passed into Republican hands in 1997. Democrats technically held a one-vote majority in the 1997–98 session; in fact the House was split 50-50, since the one independent member, Lacey Putney, caucused with the Republicans. Finally in 1999, Republicans won outright control of the House. Moss chose not to serve as minority leader in the next session, ceding the job to the previous majority leader, C. Richard Cranwell.

=== Post-House career ===
Republicans had complete control of the Virginia redistricting process following the 2000 census. Moss' House district, the 88th, was eliminated (though his district number was moved to the Fredericksburg area). Most of its territory was merged with the neighboring 89th district, a majority African-American district represented by an African-American, Jerrauld Jones. Moss chose instead to run for city treasurer, replacing the retiring Joseph T. Fitzpatrick, a former state senator and state Democratic Party chair. Moss won election with 56% of the vote.

Four years later, Moss faced an internal challenge for the Democratic nomination, where concerns were expressed about his age and health. Moss chose instead to run as an independent, winning the reelection with 45% of the vote in a four-way race with three African-American opponents. He died on November 26, 2015, in Greenville, South Carolina, from a heart attack.
