= A. L. Philpott =

American politician

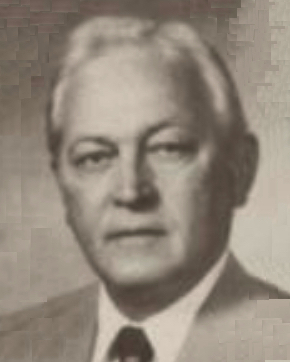

51st Speaker of the Virginia House of Delegates
- In office January 9, 1980 – September 28, 1991
- Preceded by: John Warren Cooke
- Succeeded by: Ford C. Quillen (acting)
Other leadership positions
House Majority Leader
In office January 11, 1978 – January 9, 1980
Preceded by	James M. Thomson
Succeeded by	Tom Moss

Member of the Virginia House of Delegates
- In office January 8, 1958 – September 28, 1991 Serving with Robert L. Clark (1958–1968); Garry DeBruhl (1968–1978); Mary Sue Terry (1978–1983)
- Preceded by: William F. Stone
- Succeeded by: Ward Armstrong
- Constituency: 38th district (1958–1964); 37th district (1964–1972); 13th district (1972–1982); 12th district (1982–1983); 11th district (1983–1991)

Commonwealth's Attorney for Henry County
- In office January 1, 1952 – December 31, 1957
- Preceded by: Cary J. Randolph
- Succeeded by: Kenneth Covington

Personal details
- Born: Albert Lee Philpott; July 29, 1919 Philpott, Virginia, U.S.
- Died: September 28, 1991 (aged 72) Bassett, Virginia, U.S.
- Party: Democratic
- Spouse: Katherine Spencer (m. 1941)
- Relatives: A. B. Philpott (grandfather)
- Education: University of Richmond (BA, JD)
- Occupation: Lawyer; politician

Military service
- Branch/service: United States Army; Army Air Forces; Ordnance Department
- Years of service: 1941–1945
- Battles/wars: World War II

Albert Lee Philpott (July 29, 1919 – September 28, 1991) was an American politician of the Democratic Party. He served in the Virginia House of Delegates for 33 years starting in 1958, and was its Speaker from 1980 until his death.

== Early and family life ==
Philpott was born in Philpott, Henry County, Virginia, to John Elkanah Philpott and Mary Gertrude Prillaman Philpott. His paternal grandfather, A. B. Philpott (1858–1916), founded the community of Philpott and represented the county in the Virginia House of Delegates during its 1914 session. He attended public schools in Henry County, graduating from John D. Bassett High School. He went on to the University of Richmond, getting a BA degree in 1941. After service in the United States Army Air Forces in World War II, he resumed legal studies at Richmond, obtaining a JD degree in 1947.

In August 1941 Philpott married Katherine Apperson Spencer of Lynchburg, Virginia. They had three children, Albert Jr., Judy and Carole. Carole Philpott died in 1955.

== Legal and political careers ==
Elected as Commonwealth's Attorney for Henry County in 1951, he won re-election in 1955. In 1957, midway through his second term, he won election to the House of Delegates, a part-time position which enabled him to have a private legal practice, although he could no longer hold the prosecutorial job. In that private legal practice, Philpott represented Bassett Furniture and other companies in southwest Virginia; his cousin Joe Philpott manages the Superior Lines plant for years and before he retired in 1999 supervised thirteen Bassett factories, including two in Georgia and five in North Carolina.

Philpott and another freshman, Robert L. Clark, both Democrats and members of the Byrd Organization, represented the two-member district consisting of Henry and adjoining Patrick Counties, as well as the city of Martinsville. They replaced two two-term veteran Democrats, William F. Stone (who was elected to the Senate of Virginia) and William F. Carter. This election took place during the period of massive resistance to racial desegregation in Virginia, led by United States Senator Harry F. Byrd. Philpott established himself as a supporter of continued segregation.

In 1972, Philpott's district, now numbered the 13th, was expanded to a three-member district that also included Pittsylvania County. In 1978, he became Majority Leader and chair of the Corporations, Insurance and Banking Committee. Two years later, he succeeded the retiring John Warren Cooke as Speaker.

=== Speaker of the House ===
Philpott blocked a 1982 bill by Senator Douglas Wilder of Richmond to create a state holiday to honor the birthday of Martin Luther King Jr. Later that year, he publicly referred to five African-American legislators as "boys", a statement for which he apologized the next day. In 1985, when Wilder was elected the state's first African-American Lieutenant Governor, Philpott provided an early endorsement that Wilder later called a "turning point" in the campaign.

== Death ==
Philpott suffered from various forms of cancer for nearly twenty years. On September 24, 1991, he announced he would not continue serving in the House of Delegates. He died at his home on September 28 at the age of 72. He was buried in Roselawn Burial Park in Martinsville.

In 1992, the Virginia General Assembly created the A. L. Philpott Manufacturing Center, initially charged with various responsibilities for retraining displaced workers and developing manufacturing technologies in Southside Virginia. In 1997, it was renamed Virginia's A. L. Philpott Manufacturing Extension Partnership (VPMEP) and its mission was expanded to help create and maintain industrial and manufacturing jobs throughout the Commonwealth as part of the NIST MEP network.
