= Lacey Putney =

American politician

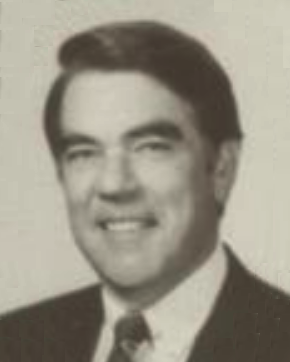
- Official portrait, 1980

Speaker of the Virginia House of Delegates
- Acting; June 15, 2002 – January 8, 2003
- Preceded by: Vance Wilkins
- Succeeded by: Bill Howell

Member of the Virginia House of Delegates
- In office January 10, 1962 – January 8, 2014
- Preceded by: Charles E. Green Jr.
- Succeeded by: Terry Austin
- Constituency: 11th district (1962–1972); 9th district (1972–1983); 19th district (1983–2014)

Personal details
- Born: Lacey Edward Putney; June 27, 1928 Big Island, Virginia, U.S.
- Died: August 26, 2017 (aged 89) Goode, Virginia, U.S.
- Party: Democratic (until 1967)
- Other political affiliations: Independent (1967–2017) (Note: Putney caucused with state house Republicans from 1998 until his retirement.)
- Spouses: Elizabeth Harlow (m. 1951; died 2005); Carmela Bills (m. 2007)
- Children: 2
- Education: Washington and Lee University (BA, LLB)
- Occupation: Lawyer; politician
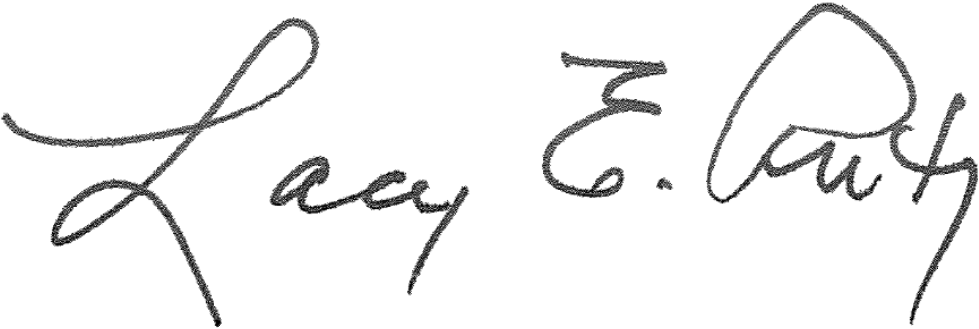
- Signature

Military service
- Branch/service: United States Air Force
- Years of service: 1950–1954
- Battles/wars: Korean War

Lacey Edward Putney (June 27, 1928 – August 26, 2017) was an American politician. He was a member of the Virginia House of Delegates from January 1962 until January 2014, making him the longest-serving member in the history of the Virginia General Assembly and one of the longest-serving state legislators in American history. He represented a district centered around his hometown of Bedford for his entire career, and at various times represented parts of neighboring Bedford and Botetourt counties.

Putney, a lawyer from Bedford, was first elected as a Democrat in 1961. He left that party later in the decade and began running as an independent, although he caucused with the Republicans from 1998.

Putney announced in March 2013 that he would not run for reelection in 2013.

== Acting Speaker ==
In June 2002, the Republican Speaker of the Virginia House of Delegates, Vance Wilkins, resigned following revelations that he had paid a staffer to keep quiet about "unwanted sexual advances". Putney, then Chair of the Privileges and Elections committee, served as Acting Speaker until the following session in January 2003, when Republican William J. Howell was elected as Speaker.

== Electoral history ==
Date	Election	Candidate	Party	Votes	%
Virginia House of Delegates, 19th district
Nov 7, 1995	General	L E Putney		15,330	99.90
Nov 7, 1995	General	Write Ins		16	0.10
Nov 4, 1997	General	Lacey E. Putney		13,195	78.39
Nov 4, 1997	General	Eric D. Thompson		3,635	21.59
Nov 4, 1997	General	Write Ins		3	0.02
Nov 2, 1999	General	L E Putney		12,842	80.86
Nov 2, 1999	General	E D Thompson		3,035	19.11
Nov 2, 1999	General	Write Ins		4	0.02
Nov 6, 2001	General	L E Putney		13,285	99.95
Nov 6, 2001	General	Write Ins		7	0.05
Nov 4, 2003	General	L E Putney		11,393	73.42
Nov 4, 2003	General	A M Lipscomb	Democratic	4,123	26.57
Nov 4, 2003	General	Write Ins		2	0.01
Nov 8, 2005	General	L E Putney		19,152	99.16
Nov 8, 2005	General	Write Ins		163	0.84
Nov 6, 2007	General	Lacey E. Putney		11,908	72.56
Nov 6, 2007	General	Lewis B. Medlin, Jr.	Democratic	4,464	27.20
Nov 6, 2007	General	Write Ins		39	0.23
Nov 3, 2009	General	Lacey E. Putney		15,297	64.13
Nov 3, 2009	General	Lewis B. Medlin, Jr.	Democratic	4,922	20.63
Nov 3, 2009	General	W. H. "Will" Smith II	Constitution	3,602	15.10
Nov 3, 2009	General	Write Ins		32	0.13
Nov 8, 2011	General	Lacey E. Putney		8,883	41.61
Nov 8, 2011	General	Jerry R. Johnson	Republican	6,775	31.73
Nov 8, 2011	General	Lewis B. Medlin, Jr.	Democratic	5,670	26.56
Nov 8, 2011	General	Write Ins		18	0.18

== 2007 voting bills ==
As Chair of the Privileges and Elections Committee, Putney blocked numerous electoral reform bills, including the National Popular Vote Interstate Compact and bills to introduce Instant Runoff Voting on a test basis. He then chaired the powerful Appropriations Committee.
