= List of speakers of the Virginia House of Delegates =

Speaker of the Virginia House of Delegates
- Great Seal of the Commonwealth of Virginia

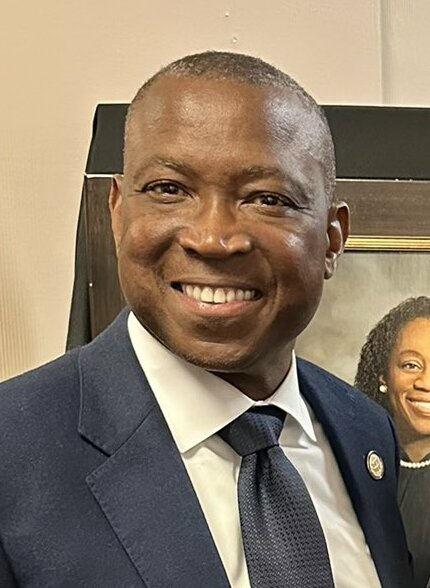
- Incumbent; Don Scott since January 10, 2024
- Virginia House of Delegates
- Style: The Honorable
- Residence: Virginia General Assembly
- Appointer: Elected by the Virginia House of Delegates
- Inaugural holder: Edmund Pendleton

This is a complete list of the speakers of the Virginia House of Delegates. Elected by the members of the House, the Speaker is the presiding officer of that body. In addition to duties as chair, the adopted rules of the House of Delegates specify other powers and duties of the post. The Speaker is currently elected for a two-year term in the odd-numbered years in which the Legislature convenes.

== List of speakers ==
Parties

No party Democratic Republican Democratic-Republican Whig Re-adjuster Conservative

#	Name	County or city	Term began	Term ended	Party
1	Edmund Pendleton	Caroline County	1776	1776	None
2	George Wythe	Williamsburg	1777	1778	None
3	Benjamin Harrison V	Charles City County	1778	1781	None
4	Richard Henry Lee	Westmoreland County	1781	1781	None
3	Benjamin Harrison V	Charles City County	1781	1781	None
5	John Tyler Sr.	Charles City County	1781	1785	None
3	Benjamin Harrison V	Charles City County	1785	1786	None
6	Joseph Prentis	Williamsburg	1786	1788	None
7	Thomas Mathews	Norfolk County	1788	1794	None
8	John Wise	Accomack County	1794	1799	None
9	Larkin Smith	King and Queen County	1799	1802	None
10	Edmund Harrison	Amelia County	1802	1803	None
11	Hugh Holmes	Frederick County	1803	1805	None
12	Peter Johnston Jr.	Prince Edward County	1805	1807	None
13	Hugh Nelson	Albemarle County	1807	1809	Democratic-Republican
14	James Barbour	Orange County	1809	1812	Democratic-Republican
15	Andrew Stevenson	Albemarle County	1812	1816	Democratic-Republican
16	Robert Stanard	Spotsylvania County	1816	1817	None
17	Linn Banks	Madison County	1817	1838	Democratic
18	Thomas W. Gilmer	Albemarle County	1839	1840	Whig
19	Valentine W. Southall	Albemarle County	1840	1842	None
20	Joel Holleman	Isle of Wight County	1842	1844	Democratic
21	William O. Goode	Mecklenburg County	1845	1846	Democratic
22	John W. Jones	Chesterfield County	1847	1847	Democratic
23	James F. Strother	Rappahannock County	1847	1848	Whig
24	Henry L. Hopkins	Powhatan County	1848	1850	Democratic
25	George W. Hopkins	Washington County	1850	1852	None
26	Oscar M. Crutchfield	Spotsylvania County	1852	1861	None
27	James L. Kemper	Madison County	1861	1863	Democratic
28	Hugh W. Sheffey	Augusta County	1863	1865	None
29	John B. Baldwin	Augusta County	1865	1869	Conservative
30	Zephaniah Turner Jr.	Rappahannock County	1869	1871	Democratic
31	J. Marshall Hanger	Augusta County	1871	1877	Democratic
32	Henry C. Allen	Shenandoah County	1877	1879	Democratic
33	Benjamin W. Lacy	New Kent County	1879	1881	Democratic
34	Isaac C. Fowler	Washington County	1881	1882	Readjuster
35	Charles E. Stuart	Alexandria	1883	1887	Democratic
36	Richard H. Cardwell	Hanover County	1887	1894	Democratic
37	John F. Ryan	Loudoun County	1894	1899	Democratic
38	Edward W. Saunders	Franklin County	1899	1901	Democratic
37	John F. Ryan	Loudoun County	1901	1906	Democratic
39	William D. Cardwell	Hanover County	1906	1908	Democratic
40	Richard E. Byrd	Winchester	1908	1914	Democratic
41	Edwin P. Cox	Richmond	1914	1916	Democratic
42	Harry R. Houston	Elizabeth City County	1916	1920	Democratic
43	Richard L. Brewer Jr.	Suffolk	1920	1926	Democratic
44	Thomas W. Ozlin	Lunenburg County	1926	1930	Democratic
45	J. Sinclair Brown	Roanoke County	1930	1936	Democratic
46	G. Aston Dovell	Williamsburg	1936	1942	Democratic
47	Thomas B. Stanley	Henry County	1942	1946	Democratic
48	G. Alvin Massenburg	Hampton	1947	1950	Democratic
49	E. Blackburn Moore	Frederick County	1950	1968	Democratic
50	John Warren Cooke	Mathews County	1968	1980	Democratic
51	Albert L. Philpott	Henry County	1980	1991	Democratic
52	Tom Moss	Norfolk	1991	2000	Democratic
53	S. Vance Wilkins Jr.	Amherst County	2000	2002	Republican
54	William J. Howell	Stafford County	2003	2018	Republican
55	Kirk Cox	Colonial Heights	2018	2020	Republican
56	Eileen Filler-Corn	Fairfax County	2020	2022	Democratic
57	Todd Gilbert	Shenandoah County	2022	2024	Republican
58	Don Scott	Portsmouth	2024	Incumbent	Democratic

== Acting Speaker ==
According to Rules 2 and 16 of the House of Delegates, the chair of the Committee on Privileges and Elections serves as Acting Speaker when there is a vacancy in the Speaker's office. This has occurred twice since 1990:

- Ford C. Quillen of Scott County was Acting Speaker from the death of A. L. Philpott on September 28, 1991, until the House met in a special redistricting session in November, when Thomas W. Moss Jr. was elected Speaker.
- Lacey E. Putney of Bedford was Acting Speaker from the resignation of S. Vance Wilkins Jr. on June 15, 2002, until the House met in regular session in January 2003, when William J. Howell was elected Speaker.

== List of speakers by time in office (incomplete) ==
Rank	Name	Time in office	TE	Year(s) in which elected
1	Linn Banks	20 years, 148 days	11	1817; 1819; 1821; 1823; 1825; 1827; 1829; 1831; 1833; 1835; 1837
2	E. Blackburn Moore	17 years, 364 days	9	1950; 1952; 1954; 1956; 1958; 1960; 1962; 1964; 1966
3	William J. Howell	15 years, 2 days	8	2003; 2004; 2006; 2008; 2010; 2012; 2014; 2016
4	John Warren Cooke	11 years, 364 days	6	1968; 1970; 1972; 1974; 1976; 1978
5	A. L. Philpott	11 years, 262 days	6	1980; 1982; 1984; 1986; 1988; 1990
6	John F. Ryan	9 years, 315 days	5	1894; 1895; 1897; 1901; 1904
7	Oscar M. Crutchfield	9 years, 123 days	5	1852; 1853; 1855; 1857; 1859
8	Thomas W. Moss Jr.	8 years, 54 days	5	1991; 1992; 1994; 1996; 1998
9	Richard H. Cardwell	6 years, 85 days	4	1887; 1889; 1891; 1893
10 (tie)	Richard E. Byrd Sr.	6 years, 6 days	3	1908; 1910; 1912
10 (tie)	Ashton Dovell	6 years, 6 days	3	1936; 1938; 1940
11	J. Sinclair Brown	6 years	3	1930; 1932; 1934
12 (tie)	J. Marshall Hanger	5 years, 364 days	3	1871; 1873; 1875
12 (tie)	Richard L. Brewer Jr.	5 years, 364 days	3	1920; 1922; 1924
13	Thomas B. Stanley	4 years, 295 days	3	1942; 1944; 1946
14	Charles E. Stuart	4 years, 3 days	2	1883; 1885
15	Harry R. Houston	4 years, 2 days	2	1916; 1918
16	Thomas W. Ozlin	3 years, 360 days	2	1926; 1928
17	John Brown Baldwin	3 years, 305 days	1	1865
18	G. Alvin Massenburg	3 years, 5 days	2	1947; 1948
19	Hugh W. Sheffey	2 years, 324 days	2	1863; 1863
20	Vance Wilkins	2 years, 154 days	2	2000; 2002
21	Zephaniah Turner Jr.	2 years, 62 days	1	1869
22	Eileen Filler-Corn	2 years, 3 days	1	2019
23 (tie)	Henry Clay Allen	1 year, 363 days	1	1877
23 (tie)	Isaac C. Fowler	1 year, 363 days	1	1881
23 (tie)	Edward W. Saunders	1 year, 363 days	1	1899
23 (tie)	William D. Cardwell	1 year, 363 days	1	1906
23 (tie)	Edwin P. Cox	1 year, 363 days	1	1914
23 (tie)	Kirk Cox	1 year, 363 days	1	2018
23 (tie)	Todd Gilbert	1 year, 363 days	1	2021
24	James L. Kemper	1 year, 43 days	1	1861
25	Donald L. Scott	2 years, 240 days	1	2023
26	Benjamin W. Lacy	97 days	1	1879

== See also ==
- List of speakers of the Virginia House of Burgesses
- Category:Speakers of the Virginia House of Delegates
- List of Virginia state legislatures
