= Britton Baskerville Jr. =

Virginia politician (1863–1892)

Member of the Virginia House of Delegates from Mecklenburg County
- In office December 8, 1887 – December 3, 1889
- Preceded by: James R. Jones
- Succeeded by: Ross Hamilton

Personal details
- Born: October 1863 Mecklenburg County, Virginia
- Died: April 25, 1892 (aged 28) Mecklenburg County, Virginia
- Party: Republican
- Occupation: Farmer, schoolteacher, politician

Britton Baskerville Jr. (1863 — 1892) was an American farmer, schoolteacher and Republican Party politician who represented Mecklenburg County in the Virginia House of Delegates from 1888 to 1889. An African American, he had been enslaved.

== Early life ==
He was born in Mecklenburg County, Virginia. Born into slavery during the American Civil War, to Sally (b. 1847) and her stonemason husband Breton (or Britton) Baskerville (1835-_). The large Baskerville family was prominent in the local Baptist church, as well as known for owning land. His exact birth date is lost, but he was enumerated as nine years old (and thus able to work) in the 1870 census, and as a 17 years old laborer in the 1880 census. In 1883 he graduated from the Boydton Academic and Bible Institute in Mecklenburg County, then continued his education in Washington, D.C., graduating in 1885 from the Wayland Institute.

== Career ==
Upon returning to Union Level, in Mecklenburg County's Flat Creek District, Baskerville taught school and farmed. He was superintendent of the Sunday school at Bloom Hill Baptist Church.

Baskerville served one term in the Virginia House of Delegates, representing Mecklenburg County, as a compromise candidate between the factions led by railroad executive and former Confederate general William Mahone and straight-out Republicans led by Ross Hamilton who supported African American John Mercer Langston for Congress (and who ultimately became Virginia's first African American congressman). The following year, Hamilton repaired his relationship with Mahone and his supporters to win the nomination, so Baskerville returned to his agricultural and teaching pursuits. The election was marred, so the results were contested and a Democrat was seated instead.

He was one of several African Americans from Mecklenburg County to serve in political office. Others included Cephas Davis, Amos A. Dodson, Ross Hamilton, Joseph R. Jones, and John Watson.

== Personal life and death ==
In December 1891, Baskerville contracted influenza, which may have been complicated by preexisting tuberculosis. According to his death certificate, he never married before dying on April 25, 1892, although a June 6, 1887 marriage record exists of a man of his name marrying Lizzie Simmons (born either in 1852 according to her death record in 1947, or 1866 according to the marriage certificate) His name continued in Mecklenburg County, as his brother William Baskerville named one of his sons after this man and the boy's grandfather.

== See also ==
- African American officeholders from the end of the Civil War until before 1900
