= Ross Hamilton =

American politician

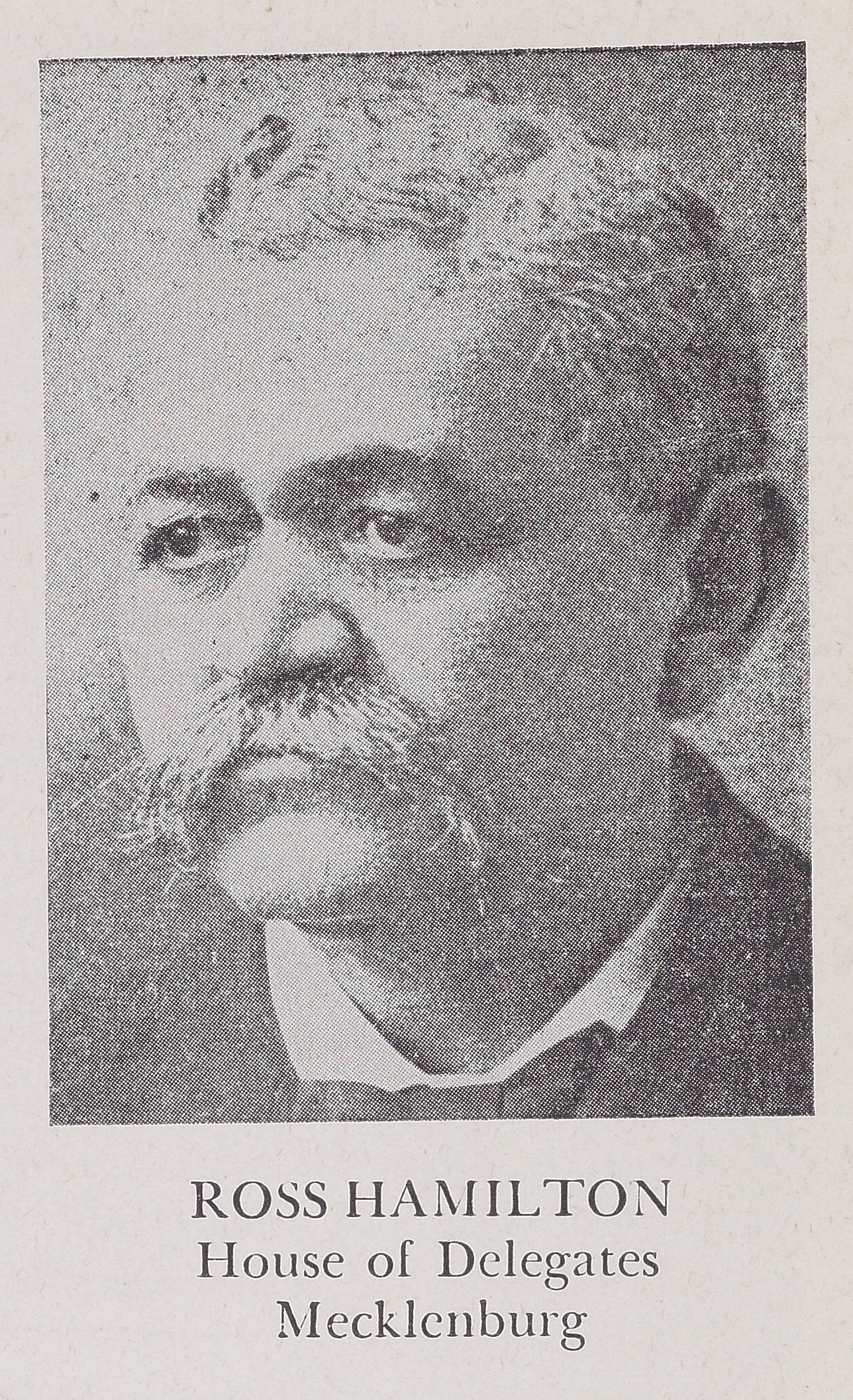

Member of the Virginia House of Delegates from the Mecklenburg district
- In office June 2, 1870 – January ?, 1883
- Preceded by: John Watson
- Succeeded by: Amos Andre Dodson
- In office November ?, 1889 – January 3rd, 1890
- Preceded by: Britton Baskerville
- Succeeded by: J.N. Hutcheson

Personal details
- Born: c. 1843 Mecklenburg County, Virginia
- Died: May 2nd, 1901 Washington, D.C.
- Spouse: Pattie Shelton • M. B. Knox
- Profession: Carpenter, storekeeper, politician

Ross Hamilton (c. 1843 – 1901) was an American carpenter, storekeeper, federal employee and Republican Party politician who represented Mecklenburg County in the Virginia House of Delegates from 1870 to 1883, and 1889–1890. Hamilton had the longest legislative career of any African American in 19th century Virginia.

== Early and family life ==
Born a slave in Mecklenburg County, Virginia in about 1843, the names of his parents remain unknown. A carpenter by trade, Hamilton had likely married a woman named Pattie Shelton by 1870, who bore 4 daughters and 2 sons together. However, three of the children died as infants and one died in college in 1885. After his first wife died of tuberculosis in November, 1883, the widower married M. B. Knox on May 18, 1885, who bore three children, but both sons also died as infants.

== Career ==
Trained as a carpenter, Hamilton eventually operated a store in Boydton, Virginia, the Mecklenburg county seat. He also purchased six pieces of real estate in Boydton near the former Randolph-Macon Academy, which had moved northward to Ashland, Virginia just north of Richmond, and its former campus ultimately became the Boydton Institute, a school for African-Americans. He bought those properties in 1871, 1872, two in 1873, one in 1875 and the last in 1892, some with Dick Jones as partner before Jones joined the Readjuster Party discussed below and also incurred legal problems in the mid-1880s.

== Political career ==
Mecklenburg County had an African American majority in this era and Hamilton was a good orator and very able political leader. He carefully cultivated friendships and made alliances throughout the country. Reportedly, he also enjoyed "drinking in bars and talking politics with his friends on Saturday nights and rising early on Sunday mornings to attend church with their families." Several politicians of both races considered him "unbeatable" as Hamilton had won the largest number of votes in seven consecutive elections for the House of Delegates from 1870 through 1881. He won his first term to finish the term of John Watson, who had represented Mecklenburg county in the Virginia Constitutional Convention of 1868 and also briefly served as delegate but died in office. Hamilton was an active member of the Republican party.

As a member of the minority party in the Virginia House of Delegates, during his first three terms, Hamilton only was appointed to low level committees, such as the "Committees on Executive Expenditures" and the "Committee on Manufactures and Mechanic Arts." A much more capable party leader than legislator, in 1882, Hamilton unsuccessfully sponsored a bill which prevented people who did not live in Virginia from attending the county's tax-payer-supported public schools. He was a delegate to the Republican National Conventions in 1872 and 1876. Unlike most African American political leaders in Virginia during his time, he did not initially support the Readjuster party, and remained a "straightout" Republican. This ended up costing him his seat in the Legislature, as the Readjusters who were at the height of their political power, ran an African American man (Amos Andre Dodson) to challenge Hamilton for the nomination. Dodson ended up winning the Republican nomination for the Mecklenburg County seat in the House of Delegates, and thus denied Hamilton his 8th term. However, Dodson lost his re-election bid, and two years later Hamilton threw his support to Britton Baskerville Jr. who won. Hamilton would run again in 1889 for his seat in the Virginia House of Delegates, winning the primary when Baskerville withdrew, then outpolled J.N. Hutcheson, a white man 2248 votes to 2194. But, just a month into the subsequent Virginia General Assembly session, the House declared Hamilton's election improper, and seated his opponent.

== Later life ==
After losing his legislative seat in 1890, Hamilton moved permanently to Washington D.C., where he had begun working at patronage jobs as early as 1879 (and commuted to Boydton for years). He held jobs in the Government Printing Office and later at the Department of the Interior. Hamilton continued his political activism, speaking at an 1892 meeting of the Virginia Republicans at the party’s national headquarters in Washington, as well as campaigning for the Republican congressional candidate in the Fourth District in 1894 and 1898.

== Death and legacy ==
Hamilton died at his residence in Washington, D.C., on May 2, 1901, and was buried on the grounds of Boydton Institute in Boydton, Virginia. His Boydton properties had declined in value and were ultimately sold to pay debts of his estate.

== See also ==
- African American officeholders from the end of the Civil War until before 1900
