= Dungee =

Dungee is a surname. Notable people with this surname include:

- Chelsea Dungee (born 1997), American basketball player
- Jesse Dungee (c. 1812–1884) shoemaker, minister and state legislator in Virginia
- John Dunjee (1833–1903), American missionary, educator and Baptist minister
- Shed Dungee (1831–1900), cobbler, preacher and state legislator in Virginia
