= Isaac Fowler =

Isaac Fowler may refer to:

- Isaac Vanderbeck Fowler (1818–1869), New York politician in Tammany Hall
- Isaac C. Fowler (1831–1905), Virginia politician
