= Edwin F. Savacool =

American Civil war participant, Medal of Honour recipient

Captain Edwin F. Savacool
- Born: 1835; Jackson, Michigan, U.S.
- Died: June 5, 1865 (aged 29–30); Washington, D.C., U.S.
- Burial place: Elmwood Cemetery, Detroit
- Military career
- Allegiance: United States
- Branch: Army
- Service years: 1861–1865
- Rank: Captain
- Units: Company K, 1st New York Cavalry
- Conflicts: Battle of Sailor's Creek
- Awards: Medal of Honor

Edwin F. Savacool (1835 – June 5, 1865) was a captain in the United States Army who was awarded the Presidential Medal of Honor for gallantry during the American Civil War. He was awarded the medal on April 24, 1865, for actions performed at the Battle of Sailor's Creek in Virginia on April 6, 1865.

== Personal life ==
Savacool was born in Jackson, Michigan, to Morrilla Savacool in 1835. His home of record was Marshall. He died of wounds received in battle on June 2, 1865, at Armory Square Hospital in Washington, D.C., and was buried in Oakridge Cemetery in Marshall. His remains were moved to Elmwood Cemetery in Detroit, section A2, lot 59, on January 13, 1883.

== Military service ==
Savacool enlisted in the Army as a private on August 29, 1861, in Grand Rapids, Michigan. Service records list his age as 21 at enlistment - however, he was later shown to be several years older. He was mustered into Company K of the 1st New York Cavalry, a regiment containing 10 New York companies, 1 Pennsylvania company, and 1 Michigan company. He was promoted to sergeant on January 1, 1864, after reenlisting in the Army, second lieutenant on March 19, 1864, and captain on February 1, 1865, and was appointed commander of K Company. He was posthumously brevetted major.

1st New York spent the first years of the war protecting the B&O Railroad near the Potomac River. Savacool acted as a scout, frequently disguising himself as a Confederate regular or mailman to infiltrate enemy lines. On one occasion, he was able to fool the commander of a Confederate raiding party, major Harry Gilmor, into divulging the date and location of his next raid by riding disguised into Gilmor's camp and handing Gilmor a letter from Gilmor's lover; after drinking brandy in celebration, Gilmor informed Savacool of the planned attack on a bridge in Back Creek. This information led to the capture of 36 Confederate raiders the next day.

Savacool eventually took 72 Confederates prisoner, including future Senator Harrison H. Riddleberger and William L. Wilson, who would become a congressional Representative for West Virginia and eventually Postmaster General under the Grover Cleveland presidency. He killed one Confederate, captain John C. Blackford, and had five horses shot from under him, 3 while acting as a courier during the Second Battle of Kernstown in Virginia. He was captured twice in skirmishes but both times was promptly rescued by Union forces.

On April 6, 1865, at the Battle of Sailor's Creek, Savacool's K Company charged a line of Confederates. As Savacool captured a regimental flag from a color bearer, he was shot by a Confederate soldier. He was extracted to a hospital at City Point, Virginia, and eventually to Washington, D.C., where he died before dawn on June 3, 1865.

Savacool's Medal of Honor citation reads:

The President of the United States of America, in the name of Congress, takes pride in presenting the Medal of Honor to Captain Edwin F. Savacool, United States Army, for extraordinary heroism on April 6, 1865, while serving with Company K, 1st New York Cavalry, in action at Deatonsville, Virginia, for capture of flag, during which he was wounded and died several days later in Washington, D.C.

— E. M. Stanton, Secretary of War
