= Daniel Norton (disambiguation) =

Daniel Norton (c. 1568–1636) was an English politician.

Daniel Norton may also refer to:

- Daniel Norton (Australian politician) (1905–1992), Australian politician
- Daniel Sheldon Norton (1829–1870), American politician
- Daniel M. Norton (c. 1843-1918), African-American politician in Virginia
- Dan Norton (born 1988), rugby player
