= Benjamin W. Lacy =

American judge (1839–1895)

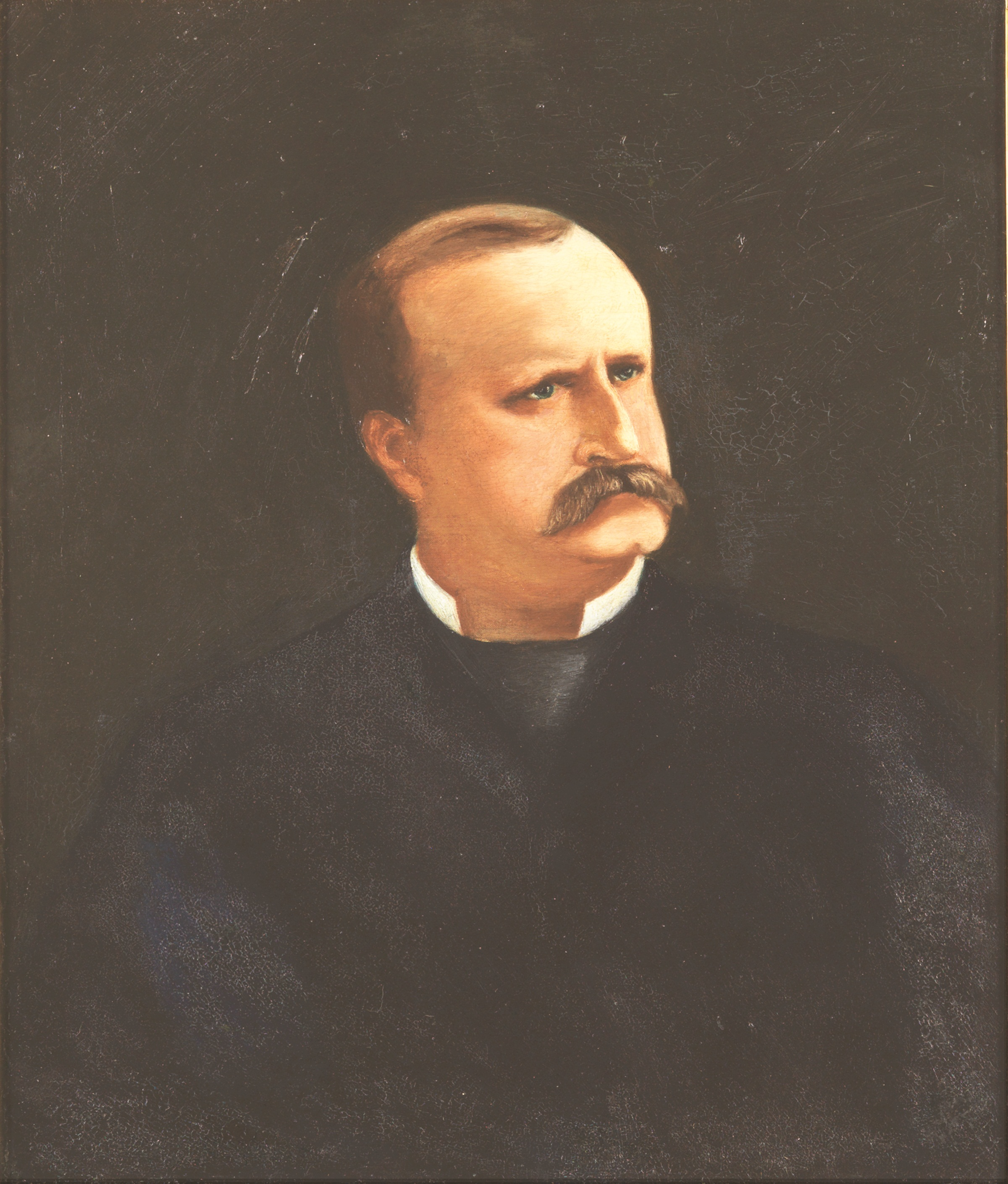
- Portrait of Lacy (c. 1895–1916)

Justice of the Supreme Court of Virginia
- In office January 1, 1883 – January 1, 1895
- Preceded by: Walter Redd Staples
- Succeeded by: James Keith

33rd Speaker of the Virginia House of Delegates
- In office December 3, 1879 – March 9, 1880
- Preceded by: Henry C. Allen
- Succeeded by: Isaac C. Fowler

Member of the Virginia House of Delegates from the New Kent and Charles Counties district
- In office January 1, 1874 – December 6, 1881
- Preceded by: William H. Patterson
- Succeeded by: William N. Tinsley

Personal details
- Born: January 27, 1839 New Kent County, Virginia, U.S.
- Died: May 15, 1895 (aged 56) New Kent County, Virginia, U.S.
- Party: Democratic
- Spouse: Sarah Rebecca Osborne
- Education: University of Virginia

Military service
- Allegiance: Confederate States of America
- Branch/service: cavalry
- Years of service: 1861–1865
- Rank: captain
- Unit: 3rd Virginia Cavalry
- Battles/wars: Battle of Nance's Shop (1864), Battle of Kelly's Ford(1863)

Benjamin Watkins Lacy (January 27, 1839 – May 15, 1895) was an American politician and Virginia lawyer, Confederate officer and jurist.

== Early and family life ==
Lacy was born on the family plantation, Ellsworth, in New Kent County, Virginia, the son of lawyer Richmond Terrell Lacy and his wife the former Ellen Green Lane. His father first won election to the Virginia House of Delegates (a part-time position) in 1842 and won re-election until 1850, then served many years as the Commonwealth Attorney (prosecutor). Through his paternal grandmother, he could trace his descent to Col. Thomas West, who served seven years on the Continental Line during the American Revolutionary War.

Virginia not having public education at the time, the firstborn son received his early education from his mother, then traveled westward to attend boarding schools, including Pike Powers Academy in Staunton and Brown and Tebbs Academy in Albemarle County. He had elder and younger sisters (Sally E. Lacy and Ellen G. Lacy, respectively, neither of whom married) as well as two younger brothers Richmond Terrell Lacy (who also joined the 3rd Virginia cavalry and later followed the family tradition as Commonwealth Attorney for New Kent County) and Thomas Hugo Lacy (who became an Episcopal priest in West Virginia and later Buckingham County, Virginia in Southside Virginia). Completing his formal education at the University of Virginia, Lacy then read law under his father's guidance. On November 14, 1878, he married Sarah Rebecca Osborne, daughter of a Presbyterian minister. They had four children who survived their father.

== Confederate military service ==
Lacy enlisted in the Confederate States Army on April 19, 1861, a week after the bombardment of Fort Sumter. Initially a private, he rose to captain his company in the 3rd Virginia Cavalry. He was wounded three times, severely in the skirmishes at Kelly's Ford in 1863 and Nance's Shop in his home county in 1864. Lacy remained in the Army of Northern Virginia until it surrendered at Appomattox Court House.

== Career ==
After the war, Lacy refreshed his studies, was admitted to the Virginia bar in 1866 and practiced law together with his father. In 1870, he was appointed to the county court of Charles City and New Kent Counties and remained there for three years until the General Assembly reorganized the judiciary.

Voters then elected Lacy to the Virginia House of Delegates to represent the combined district comprising Charles and New Kent counties. Although the area had been Republican and elected African Americans William H. Brisby and Robert G.W. Jones in the first postwar election (when each county had a delegate), then William H. Patterson in 1871 when the two counties were combined into one district, Lacy ran and repeatedly won as a Democrat with Readjuster sympathies. He served from 1874 to 1880, although in 1877 he was seated only following a successful challenge to the apparent election of John M. Gregory. During his last term, fellow delegates elected Lacy their 33rd Speaker (1879–1881).

During that term, in 1880, fellow legislators elected Lacy a judge of the Eighth Circuit Court, to fill the seat vacated by Robert L. Montague, who had died in office. Lacy resigned his part time legislative position upon taking the trial court bench. J. Marshall Hanger, although of the opposing party, offered a resolution praising Lacy's faithfulness and integrity as Speaker.

In 1882, the Virginia General Assembly elected four members to the Supreme Court of Appeals for twelve year terms effective January 1, 1883. Lacy, Thomas T. Fauntleroy, Drury A. Hinton and Robert A. Richardson remained on the appellate bench together until five successors took office in January 1895.(thus the succession box above is arbitrary)

== Death ==
During the final months of his term, Lacy suffered a lingering illness, and died at the age of 56 his New Kent County home, Marl Springs, on May 15, 1895.

Political offices
| Preceded by Henry C. Allen | Speaker of the Virginia House of Delegates; 1879-1881 | Succeeded by Isaac C. Fowler |
