= Asa Coleman =

American politician

Member of the Virginia House of Delegates
- In office December 6, 1871 – April 2, 1873

Personal details
- Born: 1830s North Carolina
- Died: February 24, 1893
- Party: Republican
- Spouse: Mary (Unknown surname)

Asa Coleman was an American politician and former slave. He served in the Virginia House of Delegates from December 6, 1871, to April 2, 1873, and served on the Committee on Asylums and Prisons. He was a Republican. In 2012 he was one of several African-American politicians recognized by the Martin Luther King Commission and the state of Virginia for his government service.

== Background ==
Little is known about Coleman's early life, but it is estimated that he was born around the early 1830s in North Carolina. He was born into slavery and worked as a slave until he gained his freedom and moved to Virginia at an unknown point of time, although records show that he worked as a carpenter in Halifax County and purchased land in the late 1800s.

Coleman married twice and had at least one son with his first wife, Amanda. His date of death is unknown, but was at some point after his name showed up in the public records on February 14, 1893, when he deeded his belongings to his wife and other heirs.

== Political work ==
Coleman won election to the House of Delegates in 1871 and sat in three sessions from December 1871 to April 1873. During his service he tried to pass a bill that would prevent punishment by whipping, supported a civil rights bill, and introduced legislation that would enable all children of white fathers to attend white public schools. This last piece of legislation would have enabled children born between slaves and white male slave owners to attend white public schools, which were superior to those attended by African American children.

Coleman did not seek re-election in 1873, but remained active in politics. He served on a political committee that sought to address and rectify the lack of jobs and was a strong proponent for improved educational opportunities for African American children. Coleman made an attempt to run for the House of Delegates again in 1875, but was unsuccessful. In his later life Coleman joined the Readjuster Party, a move common among African Americans of the time, and was a member of the Republican Party of Virginia after they broke from the Readjuster Party in 1884.

== See also ==
- African American officeholders from the end of the Civil War until before 1900
