= William H. Patterson =

American politician

Member of the Virginia House of Delegates from the Charles City and New Kent Counties district
- In office December 6, 1871-December 31, 1873
- Preceded by: Robert G.W. Jones
- Succeeded by: Benjamin W. Lacy

Personal details
- Born: February 3, 1810 Charles City County, Virginia US
- Died: May 24, 1888 (aged 78) New Kent County, Virginia, US
- Party: Republican
- Spouse(s): Mary Ann Dungey(d. 1848); Lutilda Bailey
- Profession: Politician, farmer, preacher

William Harvey Patterson (February 3, 1810 – May 24, 1888) was a farmer, Baptist preacher and Republican politician from New Kent County, Virginia.

== Early and family life ==
Born free to Rebecca Ann Patterson, a mulatto whose family had been free for generations, and John Bailey, a white carriage maker. He married twice. In 1832 Patterson married Mary Ann Dungey, who died in 1848, and in 1850 married Lutilda Bailey, then only 20 years old. He had at least three daughters with his first wife, and several sons and daughters with his second wife.

== Career ==
In 1840, when about 20, Patterson began his farming career by acquiring about 73 acres of land, and in 1847 after his father John Bailey died, he inherited another 3 acres from him and his mother inherited 91 acres (which Patterson would farm for many years and eventually inherit), all in the Tunstall area of New Kent County. The 1850 census described 40 year old Patterson as a farmer, and his household included his 60 year old mother, 20 year old second wife, 14, 10 and 8 year old daughters by his first wife and a free 12 year old mulatto boy named Warren Smith. Patterson also owned two enslaved people in 1850, a 39 year old blind Black man and an 8 year old Black boy. A decade later, in the final slave census, Patterson's household no longer included Warren Smith, nor the two slaves, but still included his now-70 year old mother, now-30 year old wife, as well as his 9 and 5 year old sons by his second wife, their 7, 3 and year old sisters, 26 year old Martha Fox (a mulatto woman), her 8 year old and infant daughters and 5 year old son, as well as 4 year old Rhoderick Patterson, 3 year old Delaware Patterson and their infant brother (who may have been sons of a now-absent daughter).

As the Civil War neared its end in 1864, troops under General Sheridan occupied and damaged Patterson's farm, and in 1874 he filed a successful claim for those damages, as well as testified on behalf of a neighbor's similar claim. In the 1870 federal census, Patterson remained a farmer, his household still included his now 81 year old mother, 40 year old second wife, 36 year old daughter from his first marriage, her 14 and 7 year old half-sisters, 19, 17 and 12 year old half brothers, 17 year old Anna Fox, and the possible grandchildren (now identified as 12 year old Delaware, 10 year old Robert and 5 year old Josephine Patterson).

Like his mother, Patterson was a member of Emmaus Baptist Church before the war, but restricted to the balcony during worship. In October 1867 Emmaus Baptist Church gave him a license to preach, and he and several other Black men, including William H. Brisby, established Second Liberty Baptist Church in Quinton, Virginia.

A leader in the African American community during Congressional Reconstruction, Patterson was elected a delegate to the Virginia House of Delegates as a Republican in 1871 after fellow Baptists William H. Brisby (who had been New Kent County's delegate) and Robert G.W. Jones (who had been Charles City County's delegate) stepped aside so that the African American vote would not be split when the counties were combined for purposes of (part-time) representation in the Virginia House of Delegates. However, in the next election, Benjamin W. Lacy, a former Confederate cavalry officer and lawyer from St. Peter's district of New Kent County, won the seat and would win re-election many times, until he resigned in order to become a judge.

== Death and legacy ==
Patterson died at home on May 24, 1888, and much of the land he had acquired remains in the family. His eldest son, John W. Patterson (1850–1880) become a minister in 1872 and led the First Baptist Church (Colored) in Danville, Virginia until his death, as well as published several sermons.

== See also ==
- African American officeholders from the end of the Civil War until before 1900
