= Richmond Terrell Lacy =

American planter & politician (1800–1877)

Member of the Virginia House of Delegates from the New Kent and Charles Counties district
- In office December 5, 1842 – March 2, 1850
- Preceded by: Robert S. Apperson
- Succeeded by: Thomas H. Wilcox

Personal details
- Born: September 1, 1800 New Kent County, Virginia, US
- Died: August 27, 1877 (aged 76) New Kent County, Virginia
- Spouse: Jane Terrell
- Children: 3 sons including Benjamin W. Lacy and 2 daughters

Richmond Terrell Lacy (September 1, 1800 – August 27, 1877) was a Virginia lawyer, politician and planter.

== Early and family life ==
Lacy was born to the former Jane Terrell and her planter husband, Benjamin Lacy, on a family plantation in New Kent County, Virginia. His maternal grandfather, Richmond Terrell, was the grandson of Revolutionary War patriot and officer Col. Thomas West.

He married Ellen Green Lane (1815–1875), daughter of Col. John Lane of "Vaucluse". Their firstborn son Benjamin W. Lacy (1839–1895) would become Speaker of the House of Delegates as well as a Confederate States Army officer during this man's lifetime and later a justice of the Virginia Supreme Court. The family included two daughters (Sally E. Lacy (1837–1896) and Ellen G. Lacy (1840–1896), respectively, neither of whom married) as well as two younger sons Richmond Terrell Lacy Jr. (1842 – 1903, who followed his father's and elder brother's tradition and became a lawyer and Commonwealth Attorney for New Kent County) and Thomas Hugo Lacy (1848 – 1928, who became an Episcopal priest in what became West Virginia and for three decades in Buckingham County in southern Virginia).

== Career ==
In addition to his duties as the elected Commonwealth Attorney (prosecutor) for New Kent County, Lacy like other family members operated plantations using enslaved labor. In the 1860 U.S. Federal Census, he owned 18 enslaved people, ranging from a 70-year-old Black man and woman, to Black men aged 35, 32, 30, 23, 18, 17 and 16 (2 youths), Black women aged 25 and 22 years old, and 12 and 6-year-old boys aged 12, 6, 2 and one year old and 9 and 4-year-old girls. A decade earlier, he may have owned 36 enslaved people. In the 1840 census, Lacy's household included this boy and two girls younger than 5 years old, as well as his wife, as well as 26 enslaved people, ranging from a man more than 50 years old and a woman more than 36 years old to four enslaved boys and four girls less than ten years old.

Voters in Charles City County and neighboring New Kent County elected Lacy to the Virginia House of Delegates in 1842 and re-elected him until just before the Virginia Constitutional Convention of 1850. Following adoption of that new constitution (which increased the voting power of western Virginia voters), Thomas H. Wilcox became the sole delegate representing the 2-county district (which had existed since adoption of the previous constitution in 1830), then when census results showed even fewer people in those Tidewater counties, James City County was added to what became a one delegate but tri-county district in 1852, with John P. Pierce as the delegate.

During the American Civil War, both of Lacy's sons old enough to volunteer joined the 3rd Virginia Cavalry, with Benjamin W. Lacy receiving promotions and R.T. Lacy Jr. transferring to the 10th Virginia Cavalry but surviving the conflict.

== Death and legacy ==
Lacy survived his wife by almost two years, but died on August 27, 1877, after a long and painful illness at his home, Burleigh in nearby King and Queen County. He is buried at St. Peter's Church in New Kent County.
