= Mann Spitler =

American politician (1825–1889)

Member of the Virginia Senate
- In office December 1, 1875 – April 2, 1879
- Preceded by: Gilbert S. Meem
- Succeeded by: Harrison H. Riddleberger
- Constituency: Shenandoah and Page counties
- In office December 2, 1861 – March 15, 1865
- Preceded by: Wright Gatewood
- Succeeded by: Peter Belew
- Constituency: Shenandoah and Page counties

Member of the Virginia House of Delegates from the Page County district
- In office December 5, 1853 – April 8, 1858
- Preceded by: Andrew Keyser
- Succeeded by: Reuben P. Bell

Personal details
- Born: 1825 Page County, Virginia, U.S.
- Died: August 25, 1889 (aged 64) Luray, Virginia, U.S.
- Spouse: Mary Ellen Strickler
- Children: 5
- Occupation: Politician

Mann Spitler (1825 – August 25, 1889) was an American politician from Virginia. He served in the Virginia House of Delegates from 1853 to 1858 and in the Virginia Senate from 1861 to 1865 and from 1875 to 1879.

== Biography ==
Spitler was born in 1825 in Page County, Virginia.

Spitler served as a member of the Virginia House of Delegates, representing Page County, from 1853 to 1858. He was elected as a member of the Virginia Senate. He represented Shenandoah and Page counties from 1861 to 1865 until he was defeated for re-election by Harrison H. Riddleberger. He represented Shenandoah and Page counties in the Senate again from 1875 to 1879. He was an agent of the Shenandoah Valley Railroad in Luray, Virginia, from 1875 to 1889.

Spitler married Mary Ellen Strickler. They had at least five daughters, Alice Lee, Barbara, Laura M., Mrs. Frank H. Tharpe, and Mary Ella. Their homestead was called the "Spitler Hillside". He was a member of the New School Baptist Church.

Spitler died on August 25, 1889, aged 64, at his home in Luray.
