= Robert Norton (Virginia politician) =

American politician

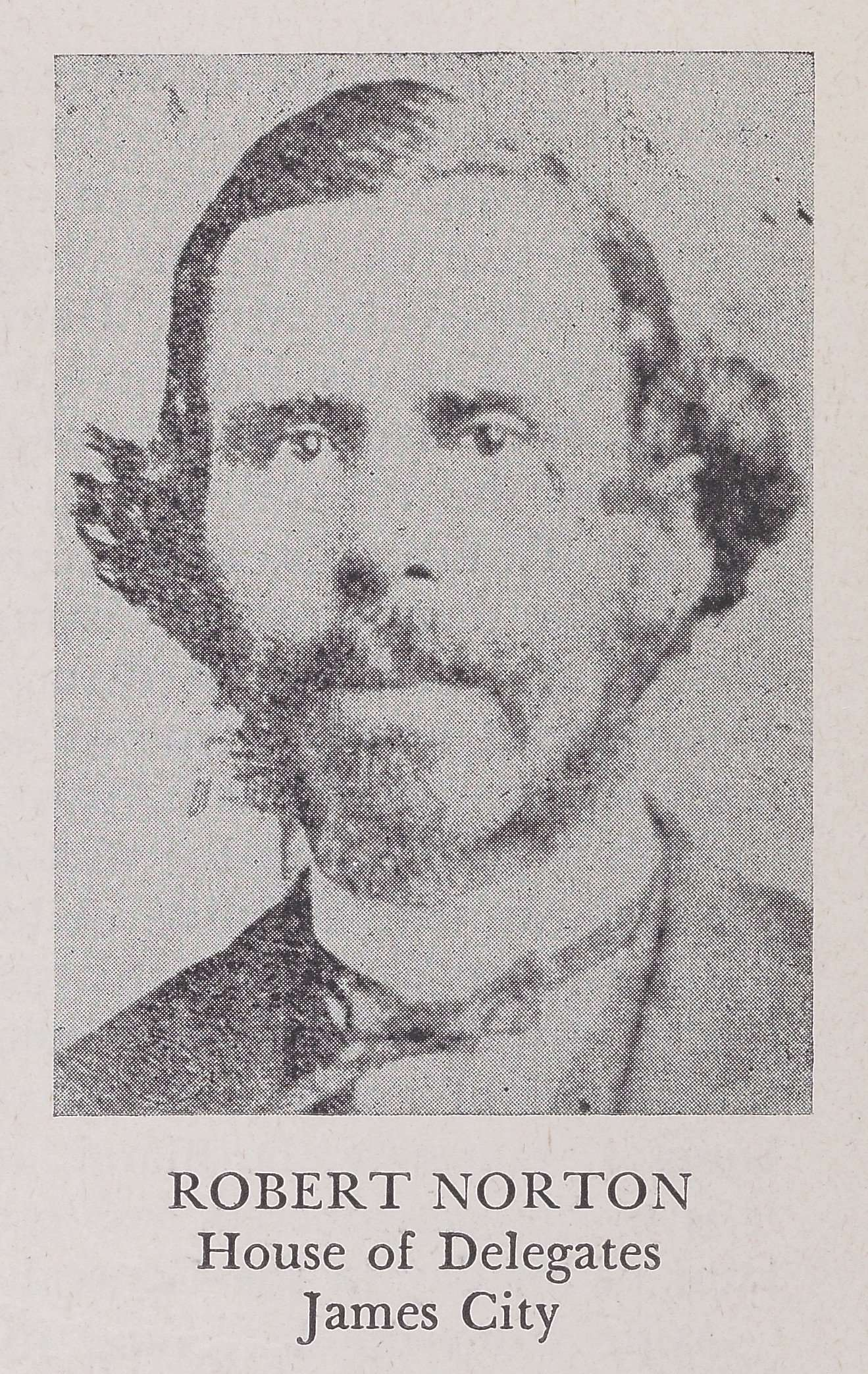
Robert Norton

Robert Norton (born about 1840) was a former slave who became a member of the Virginia House of Delegates from 1869 until 1874 and 1876 until 1883. He was one of three brothers who held office. His much older brother Frederick S. Norton was a member of the House of Delegates from 1869 until 1871, and his younger brother was Daniel M. Norton. The brothers were reportedly the children of a slave and her owner. They escaped to Troy, New York.

Norton and his brother Daniel returned to Yorktown, Virginia after the American Civil War. He was a shopkeeper and farmer.

Running as an independent in 1874 for a seat in the U.S. Congress, he criticized his White Republican incumbent opponent, James H. Platt Jr., as a carpetbagger and urged voters to elect a "colored" man. Democrat John Goode won the election in November 1874.

Norton appeared on the Readjuster Party ticket in November 1881.

== See also ==
- African American officeholders from the end of the Civil War until before 1900
