= James R. Jones (Virginia politician) =

Virginia politician

James Richard Jones

Member of the Virginia House of Delegates from the Mecklenburg County district
- In office December 2, 1885 – 1887
- Preceded by: Amos Andre Dodson
- Succeeded by: Britton Baskerville Jr.

Member of the Virginia Senate from the Charlotte and Mecklenburg Counties
- In office December 7, 1881 – December 4, 1883
- Preceded by: C.L. Davis
- Succeeded by: William Townes
- In office November 1876 – December 4, 1877
- Preceded by: Albert P. Lathrop
- Succeeded by: E. B. Goode

Personal details
- Born: circa 1847 Mecklenburg County, Virginia
- Died: after 1902 Washington, D.C.
- Party: Republican; Readjuster Party
- Spouse(s): Mary E. Jones, Martha Jones
- Occupation: Postmaster, politician, policeman

James Richard Jones (commonly known as "Dick Jones") was an African American who served in both houses of the Virginia General Assembly during the Reconstruction era, as well as the federal postmaster for Boydton (the Mecklenburg county seat). He was affiliated with the Readjuster Party and earlier with the Republican party. After losing his bid for re-election, Jones moved to Washington, D.C. where he served as a member of the U.S. Capitol Police.

== Career ==
Jones was a business partner of Ross Hamilton, who had been born a slave in Mecklenburg County, Virginia and after being freed as a result of the American Civil War, represented Mecklenburg County many times in the Virginia House of Delegates. Jones and Hamilton bought several pieces of real estate in Boydton, the Mecklenburg County seat. However, they eventually had a falling out, with Hamilton remaining a "straightout" Republican, and Jones affiliating with the Readjuster Party led by former Confederate general turned railroad executive William Mahone.

Jones first won election to the Virginia Senate by taking over mid-term to fill the vacated seat after the death of Albert P. Lathrop, who represented Mecklenburg and neighboring Charlotte County, Virginia. In 1877, Jones ran for the next session as a Radical Republican but lost to a white conservative E. B. Goode by 373 votes.

In August 1880 Jones received a Patronage appointment as postmaster for Boydton, and continued in that position until January 12, 1885. This caused complications because Virginia law prohibited federal employees from serving as state legislators (although Virginia state legislators can hold other employment).

During this same period Jones ran again for that state senate seat (Goode having been succeeded by C.L. Davis), but this time as a member of the Readjuster Party and in 1881 won a four-year term. Jones introduced two bills to abolish the whipping post and to remove that slavery legacy from the state. However, Jones resigned on December 1, 1883 part way through his term. He was one of four senators found to have flaunted the constitution and laws by being elected whilst holding a salaried office under the State Government.

Jones then ran for delegate in 1885 and defeated Democrat Charles L. Finch. Having resigned his federal job, he represented Mecklenburg County in the Virginia House of Delegates from 1885 to 1887 as a Republican. However, he failed to gain the Republican nomination for the next term in 1887, presumably at least in part because of legal troubles described below.

In the same month as his legislative service resumed, December 1885, Jones was accused of stealing a registered letter two years earlier whilst he was the Boydton postmaster. He was tried, April 13, 1886, at the federal court in Richmond on charges of mail tampering, but the jury could not agree on his guilt, and hung. In October he was again tried on those charges and acquitted.

By December 1888 Jones had moved to Washington, D.C. where he joined the Capitol police force.

== Family life ==
Because of his common name and use of nickname, this man's date of birth is unclear. He may be the 33 year old Black farmer James Jones who lived with his wife, son and daughter in Boydton, the Mecklenburg County seat in 1880. Complicating matters, two White men of the same name also lived in the county, merchant James R. Jones who operated a store in Boydton with his brother Silas, and James T. Jones who lived in Clarksville with his wife and family. While James B. Jones shows in the 1900 census of Washington D.C. as living at 1716 E. Street NW, that man born in Virginia in 1847 was a servant to John Keane, a New Yorker who worked as a driver. and another James Jones who worked as a cart-driver and was born in Virginia circa 1854 lived with his wife and another Black couple in another ward.

== See also ==
- African American officeholders from the end of the Civil War until before 1900
