= Harrison H. Riddleberger =

American politician

Harrison Holt Riddleberger
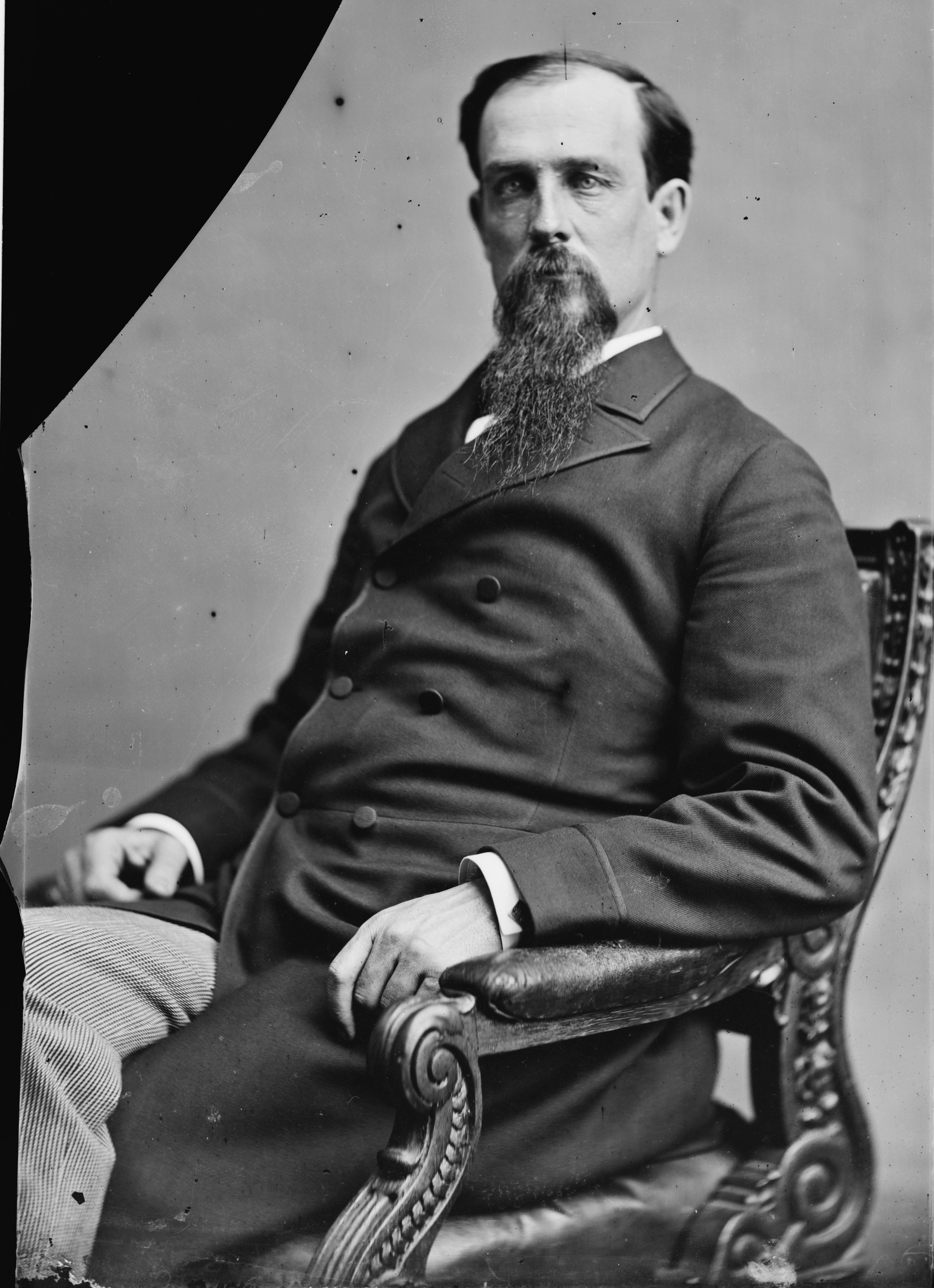

United States Senator from Virginia
- In office March 4, 1883 – March 4, 1889
- Preceded by: John W. Johnston
- Succeeded by: John S. Barbour, Jr.

Member of the Virginia Senate for Shenandoah and Page
- In office December 3, 1879 – March 4, 1883
- Preceded by: Mann Spitler
- Succeeded by: Amos K. Grim

Member of the Virginia House of Delegates from Shenandoah County
- In office 1871–1875 Serving with James W. Smoot; John W.R. Moore
- Preceded by: J. L. Campbell
- Succeeded by: Henry C. Allen

Personal details
- Born: October 4, 1843 Edinburg, Virginia, U.S.
- Died: January 24, 1890 (aged 46) Woodstock, Virginia, U.S.
- Party: Conservative Party of Virginia; Readjuster Party; Democratic
- Profession: Lawyer, soldier, newspaperman

Military service
- Allegiance: Confederate States of America
- Branch/service: infantry, cavalry
- Years of service: 1862–1865
- Rank: lieutenant, captain
- Unit: 10th Virginia Infantry
- Commands: 23rd Virginia Cavalry

Harrison Holt Riddleberger (October 4, 1843 – January 24, 1890) was a Virginia lawyer, newspaper editor and politician from Shenandoah County. A Confederate States Army officer who at various times aligned with the Conservative Party of Virginia, the Readjuster Party and the Democratic Party, Riddleberger served in both houses of the Virginia General Assembly, which elected him for one term as U.S. Senator (from 1883 to 1889).

== Early life ==
Riddleberger was born in Edinburg, Virginia in Shenandoah County to the former Susan Shyrock, whose father owned considerable land in Edinburgh. His father, Madison Riddleberger was a gunsmith and stagecoach driver who had moved from Botetourt County and joined the local militia as a private by 1835. The family included an elder sister Louisa C. Riddleberger Grandstaff (1832–1908) as well as a younger brother William Riddleberger (1847-1920). Another boy, Henry W Riddleberger died when Harrison was an infant.

Harrison Riddleberger received enough schooling at the local private academies to begin working as a clerk in a local store when he was 15 (in 1858). Two years later, he organized a local cavalry company in Harrisonburg. His father owned two slaves in the 1830 and 1840 federal censuses, and in the latter census the Riddleberger household also included a free black woman.

== American Civil War ==
During the spring of 1862 as American Civil War continued, Edinburgh became a base for Confederate Captain Turner Ashby during General Stonewall Jackson's Valley Campaign. Riddleberger volunteered for the Confederate Army and was commissioned a first lieutenant in the 10th Virginia Infantry on April 22, 1862, helping to lead Company C. He participated in the Second Battle of Bull Run, then was on sick leave in September and October 1862 and was accidentally shot in the foot on October 22, 1862. In January 1863, Riddleberger was sent as a recruiting officer to his native Shenandoah Valley. and also acted as a scout for Union troop movements.

Riddleberger re-enlisted on November 21, 1863, bought a Confederate saddle and equipment, and rose to become Captain of company G of the 23rd Virginia Cavalry. However, on May 14, 1864, Union forces captured Capt. Riddleberger at Edinburg and sent him as a prisoner of war to Wheeling's Atheneum Prison. He spent most of the rest of the war as a P.O.W., being transferred to Camp Chase in Ohio, then Point Lookout, Maryland and historic Fort McHenry in Baltimore, Maryland before being transferred back to Point Lookout, where he was released upon taking the oath of allegiance as the war ended. One account has him being transferred in a prisoner exchange in early 1865, but being recaptured less than a month later.

== Career ==
After the war, Riddleberger again became a clerk in Woodstock, as well as taught school and began a newspaper, the Tenth Legion Banner. By 1870, intrigued by reading a copy of Blackstone's Commentaries while imprisoned at Camp Chase, Riddleberger began reading law under the guidance of former Confederate officer Henry C. Allen, the son of judge John J. Allen and whose grandfather had been a judge in Woodstock (and whose relative may have volunteered in Hardy County for cavalry service under Riddleberger). Riddleberger moved to Woodstock, the Shenandoah County seat, and began editing the Shenandoah Herald. Admitted to the Virginia bar, Riddleberger opened his legal practice in Woodstock.

=== Virginia politician and newspaperman ===
After reapportionment following the 1870 census, and re-enfranchisement of many Confederates, Riddleberger ran for one of what had become Shenandoah County's two seats in the Virginia House of Delegates. He won election and re-election as a Conservative, serving first alongside James W. Smoot, then John W. R. Monroe. Until 1875, Riddleberger was on the Conservative Party's state committee, but he was a Democratic presidential elector in 1876.

In 1876, Riddleberger won election as the Commonwealth attorney (local prosecutor) for Shenandoah County, and won re-election once, serving until 1883. Although Riddleberger failed in his first attempt to win election to the state Senate in 1875, in 1879, he was elected to the state Senate representing Shenandoah and Page counties and served one term (until 1882).

During this period Riddleberger also edited and published newspapers at Woodstock, first the Shenandoah Democrat and after 1880 the Virginian. Beginning in 1884, Riddleberger and his wife would own and publish the Shenandoah Herald.

In the late 1870s, Riddleberger joined former Confederate general and railroad builder William Mahone (supported by the Richmond Whig newspaper) in forming a coalition of blacks, Republicans, and populist Democrats which became known as the Readjuster Party. The Readjusters dominated Virginia's politics for about 10 years, until a group of "Conservative" Democrats led by John S. Barbour, Jr. (who would succeed Riddleberger) took power in the late 1880s. Riddleberger was one of the Readjuster party's presidential electors in 1880, but pledged to vote for the Democratic candidate.

Riddleberger's main legislative accomplishment was passage of debt readjustment legislation, a process that began in the spring 1880 state legislative session, even though as a delegate in 1872 Riddleberger had opposed repeal of the then-new debt funding legislation. Virginia had issued bonds before the Civil War to construct railroads, canals and roads, many of them in the state's western portion and which were destroyed during the Civil War (hence the security for the bonds was also worthless). Legal cases concerning the size and proportion of this debt owed by West Virginia would continue for decades. Inexperienced Virginia legislators during the first postwar legislative sessions (such as Dr. Belew) has agreed to honor the debt at face value and unusually high interest rate, as well as to allow debt coupons to be used at face value to pay current state taxes. The bonds actually sold at a great discount (often to British and other overseas investors), and by the late 1870s many forged and counterfeit bonds and coupons existed. Meanwhile, Virginia's economy had collapsed after the war and was slow to recover, and the postwar state Constitution established public schools. For a decade, legislators had fought over whether to "adjust" the prewar debt, as well as how to pay for teachers and other state officials. Riddleberger's bill applied to the three-fifths of the total debt allocated to Virginia and would only allow 3% interest, as well as limited bondholders' ability to pay state taxes with the bonds' coupons. Although both houses passed the bill, governor Frederick W.M. Holliday (the former Commonwealth attorney for Frederick County and a "Funder") vetoed the measure.

During the next gubernatorial election, Riddleberger sought his Readjuster party's nomination, but it went instead to fellow Confederate veteran William E. Cameron of Petersburg, Virginia, Mahone's friend. The Readjuster ticket swept all 3 statewide offices; Cameron defeated Confederate veteran (and future U.S. Senator) John W. Daniel to become Virginia's 39th governor. During the campaign, on October 15, 1881, Riddleberger twice attempted to duel with newly elected U.S. Congressman George D. Wise (from 1870 to 1879 the Richmond City Commonwealth Attorney) and the editor of the Richmond State newspaper over supposed Readjuster Party correspondence published in that newspaper. Dueling was illegal at the time, but no shots were fired during the first duel because of a lack of blasting caps. During the second duel, all three rounds missed. However, Riddleberger was arrested for dueling after giving a speech at a Readjuster meeting that evening. He was eventually released after posting $1000 bail and agreeing not to duel for a year. However, dueling would become the subject of two laws passed during the Readjuster dominated legislative session of 1881–1882.

On December 21, 1881, as the new legislative session began with a significant Readjuster majority, legislators elected Riddleberger to the U.S. Senate (even though the seat would not become vacant for more than a year). During that legislative session, Riddleberger reintroduced his debt readjustment legislation as three bills, all of which became law after passage by both houses and Gov. Cameron's signature (although litigation concerning them would continue for a while after Riddleberger succeeded John W. Johnson and served as U.S. Senator from March 4, 1883, until March 4, 1889). The "Riddleberger Debt Act," provided for $21,035,377.15 in 3-percent fifty-year bonds, issued in exchange for the prewar bonds (which reduced the interest rate by half and principal by about a third), and prohibited paying state taxes with coupons. Readjusters also funded public education, abolished (temporarily) the poll tax, and for the first time tried to levy real taxes on railroads and other corporations. The U.S. Supreme Court upheld the first "coupon-killer" bond act in 1883.

=== U.S. Senator ===
In the U.S. Senate, then equally divided between Democrats and Republicans, Riddleberger and Mahone caucused with the Republicans. Riddleberger became chairman of the Committee on Manufactures (which later became the Committee on Commerce, Science and Transportation). He was not a candidate for reelection in 1888, since the Readjusters had lost their majority in 1883 (in an election shortly after the Danville Massacre), failed to regain it in 1884 and 1885 (after newly elected President Grover Cleveland, a Democrat, removed prior Republican patronage employees). The new Democratic majority had accepted the debt reduction as well as free schools, but also put local election boards under statewide legislative control and selected Funder Major J.W. Daniel to succeed Mahone.

Meanwhile, Riddleberger earned reputations for hard drinking and eccentricity in the Senate. In early 1885, Riddleberger became the only senator to vote against a resolution condemning an Irish separatist attack in London, and later became the only senator to vote against confirmation of Delaware's U.S. Senator Thomas Bayard as Secretary of State (because of his support for Britain's Irish policy). He also condemned the departing Senator Mahone as arrogant and stubborn and for the party's loss in 1884. While he continued to caucus with the Republicans in the Senate after Mahone's departure, Riddleberger returned to the Democratic party by the time his term expired in March 1889.

== Personal life ==
Riddleberger married Emma Belew, one of the daughters of Dr. Peter Belew (1819-1904), who served in the state Senate after the Civil War, and had owned slaves before the conflict. They had sons Frank Belew Riddleberger (1872–1965), Ralph Heiskel Riddleberger (1877–1949), Hugh Riddleberger (1880–1909) and Harrison Heath Riddleberger (1883–1941), as well as daughters Lelia Myrtle Riddleberger Magruder (1867–1939), Olive Mizpah Riddleberger (1870–1958) and Edna V. Riddleberger Kelly (1875-1950; who married a publisher and moved to Chicago, Illinois).

== Death and legacy ==
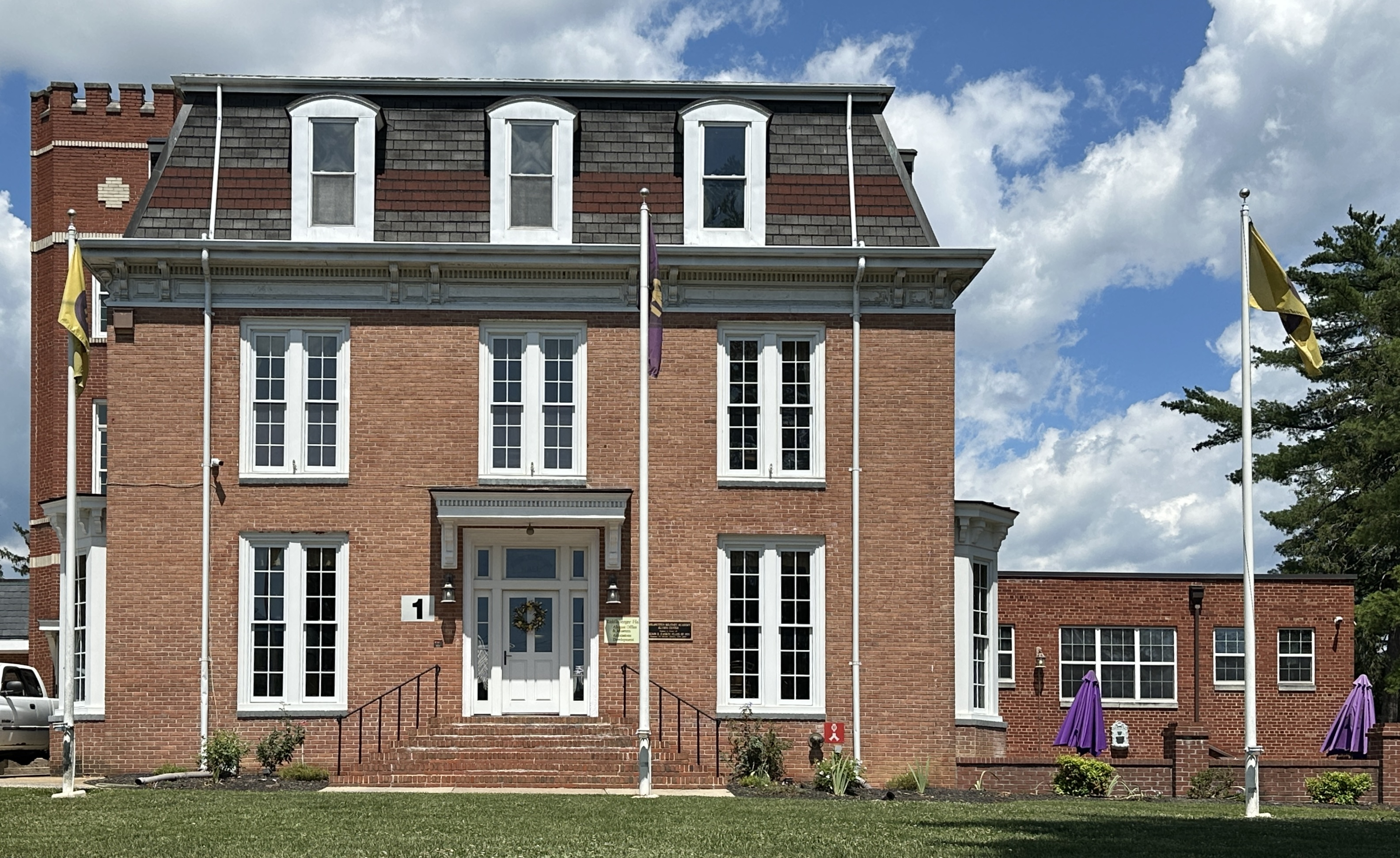
Riddleberger Hall at the Massanutten Military Academy is Riddleberger's former residence.

In the fall of 1889, Riddleberger delivered several speeches for the gubernatorial election that were considered somewhat incoherent. Late that year, he became bedridden, and he died at his Woodstock home on January 24, 1890, at the age of 46. He had been unconscious for several weeks, and was considered to have suffered from "softening of the brain."

His widow continued publishing the Shenandoah Herald until 1894, and joined him in 1916 (having survived their son Hugh, who was also buried at Cedarwood). Other children would be buried at Massanutten cemetery, which Riddleberger helped dedicate. Their home in Woodstock survives in the Woodstock Historic District, having been acquired by the Massanutten Military Academy when it was founded in 1899. Now known as "Riddleberger Hall", it houses the alumni association headquarters.

U.S. Senate
Preceded by John W. Johnston	U.S. senator (Class 2) from Virginia; March 4, 1883 – March 4, 1889; Served alongside: William Mahone, John W. Daniel	Succeeded by John S. Barbour, Jr.
