= Cephas L. Davis =

American politician from Virginia

Member of the Virginia Senate
- In office 1879–1880

Personal details
- Born: November 1839
- Died: May 26, 1907 (aged 67) Williamsburg
- Party: Republican

Cephas L. Davis (November 1839 – May 26, 1907) was a pastor, teacher and state legislator who served in the Virginia Senate after the Reconstruction era, from 1879 - 1880.

He was born a slave to Cephas Davis and Annie "Frances" Davis around November 1839 in Christiansville Mecklenburg County, Virginia (now Chase City). He became a free man sometime before the end of the American Civil War and attended an educational institution before going on to teach former slaves in Maryland from 1869 to 1870.

Reverend Cephas Davis was the pastor of the Colored Baptist Church in Chase City.

He ran as a Radical for the Senate in 1879 against the Conservative nomination John W. Eggleston and W. H. Jones a Readjuster. The Richmond Dispatch declared Eggleston the favorite and described Davis as a "jet-black Radical" that the other blacks would not solidly support.

Senator Davis was refused service in a Richmond restaurant in January 1880 along with two friends as the owner said he kept his business "for white persons only".

In August 1883 he attempted with others to free black festival goers that had been arrested by the town sergeant Mr A. J. White. Mr White was knocked down twice and Davis attacked him the following day and them went on to assault the mayor Joseph Prichard. Davis was badly beaten, arrested and later found guilty by grand jury for the three instances.

== Later life and death ==
He moved to Philadelphia from Virginia sometime before 1902 and became the president of a social organization. He had dementia in his final years and died of arteriosclerosis in hospital on May 26, 1907. He was buried in Merion Memorial Park in Montgomery County, Pennsylvania.

== See also ==
- African American officeholders from the end of the Civil War until before 1900
