= Amos Andre Dodson =

Virginia politician (1856–1888)

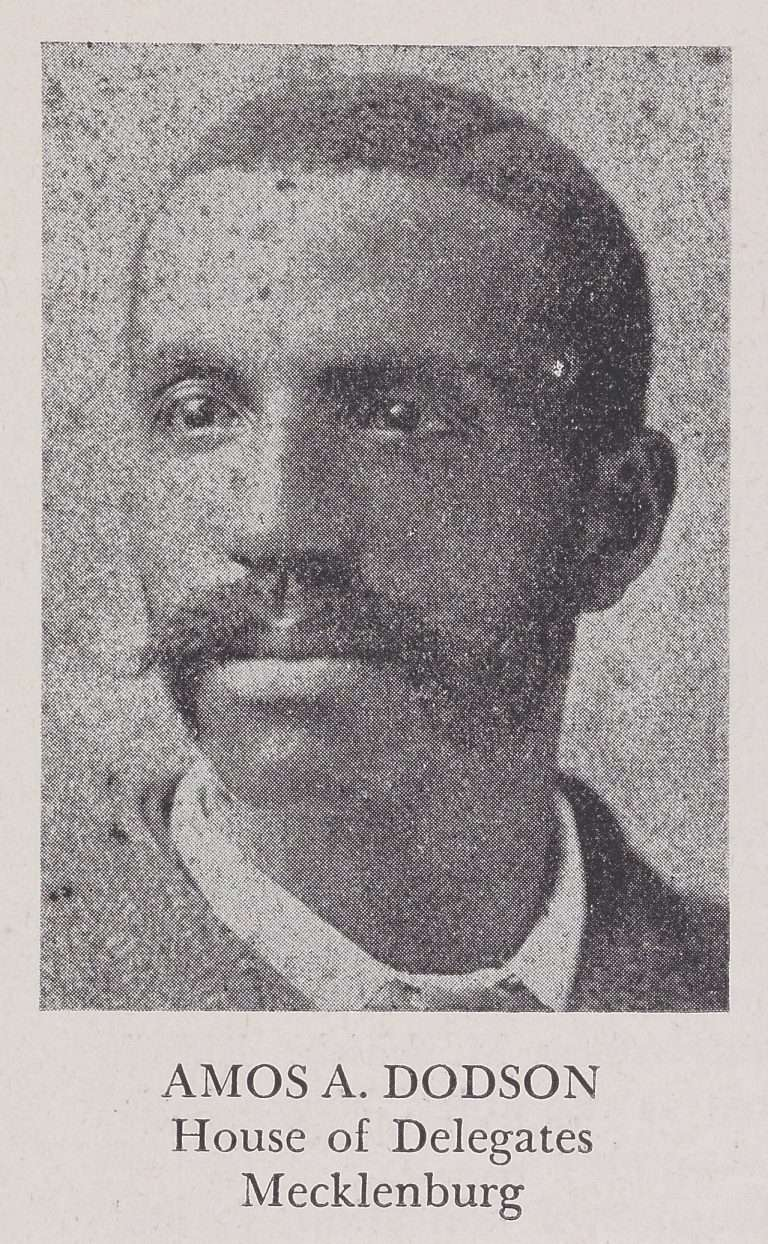

Member of the Virginia House of Delegates from the Mecklenburg County
- In office December 5, 1883 – December 1, 1885
- Preceded by: Ross Hamilton
- Succeeded by: J.R. Jones

Personal details
- Born: April 10, 1856 Mecklenburg County, Virginia
- Died: December 26, 1888 (aged 32) Knoxville, Tennessee
- Party: Readjuster/Republican
- Spouse: Sylvia J. Mason (M. 1888)
- Occupation: Teacher, newspaperman, politician, carpenter

Amos Andre Dodson (April 10, 1856 — December 26, 1888) was an American farmer, teacher, carpenter, newspaperman, public official, and state legislator in Virginia. He represented Mecklenburg County in the Virginia House of Delegates during the 1883-1884 session. He aligned with the local Republican and Readjuster political parties.

== Early life ==
Dodson was born into slavery on April 10, 1856, to parents Judith Hepburn Dodson and her blacksmith husband, James Dodson. His mother died while he was young. After working as a house slave for eight years, Dodson was apprenticed to a cabinetmaker, and freed as a result of the Civil War. He also attended a school taught by a northern white man, who later taught him privately. While studying at night, he worked for a physician who acquainted him with history and English literature. He later read law under the direction of Alfred W. Harris, who represented Dinwiddie County and Petersburg (the nearest city to Mecklenburg County) in the state legislature.

== Career ==
In 1872, Dodson started a decade long career as a teacher in Mecklenburg County. In the 1880 United States census, he served as a census enumerator. Dodson taught school at other times as well, and also held a part share of an undertaking business.

== Political career ==
During the 1870s Dodson became involved with the Republican Party of Virginia, and in 1882 received a job as a railroad mail clerk from former Confederate general turned Readjuster Party leader and railroad executive William Mahone. In 1883, Dodson ran in the Republican primary for a seat in the Virginia House of Delegates from Mecklenburg County against seven-term incumbent Ross Hamilton. Dodson had support from the Readjuster Party and unseated Hamilton, then despite Democratic victories elsewhere in the state, beat his Democratic opponent by a vote of 1,933 to 1,584 during the general election.

As a delegate (a part-time position in that era), Dodson served on the Legislature's Immigration committee. During this time, despite the Readjuster Party losing control of Virginia, the Republicans were still in control at the national level, and Dodson received an appointment as Deputy Collector of the Internal Revenue Service. In 1882 he helped incorporate the Colored Agricultural and Industrial Association of Virginia. In 1884, Dodson was chosen as an at-large delegate to the Republican National Convention in Chicago. He did not seek reelection to the legislature in 1885, but continued to organize for the Republican Party in Mecklenburg and neighboring Charlotte counties that year. He worked to revitalize a Republican-led political coalition under Readjuster leader William Mahone's direction.

== Later life and death ==
In late 1886, Dodson moved to Knoxville, Tennessee and during this time, opposed a prohibition amendment to the states constitution. In 1887, Dodson again gained public attention when he successfully advocated the development of two Tennessee railway lines. In 1888, Dodson became seriously ill with typhoid fever and later with consumption, likely tuberculosis. Just weeks before his death, he married teacher Sylvia J. Mason on November 29, 1888. Dodson died at his Knoxville home on December 26, 1888, and was most likely buried in that city.

== See also ==
- African American officeholders from the end of the Civil War until before 1900
