= John Watson (Virginia politician) =

American politician

- Born: Mecklenburg County, Virginia, U.S.
- Died: 1870
- Title: Delegate

John Watson (died 1870) was a nineteenth-century African-American politician from Virginia.

== Early life ==
Watson was born a slave in Mecklenburg County, Virginia.

== Career ==
The Virginia Capitol at Richmond, Virginia, where 19th century Conventions met

As an adult following the American Civil War, Watson spent the five years of his life as a freedman promoting African-American schools and churches in Mecklenburg.

In 1867, Watson was elected to the Virginia Constitutional Convention of 1868. A Republican, he was the sole delegate elected from the central Piedmont convention district made up of his home Mecklenburg County.

Following the Convention, Robinson was subsequently elected to the Virginia House of Delegates for the session 1869/70.

== Death ==
John Watson died in 1870 before the end of his term in office. He was succeeded by Ross Hamilton.

== Bibliography ==
- Jackson, Luther Porter (1945). Negro Office-Holders in Virginia, 1865-1895. Guide Quality Press, Norfolk, Virginia. ISBN 9780598580269.
- Pulliam, David Loyd (1901). The Constitutional Conventions of Virginia from the foundation of the Commonwealth to the present time. John T. West, Richmond. ISBN 978-1-2879-2059-5.
- Swem, Earl Greg (1918). A Register of the General Assembly of Virginia, 1776-1918, and of the Constitutional Conventions. David Bottom, Superintendent of Public Printing. ISBN 978-1-3714-6242-0.
