= Shed Dungee =

American cobbler, preacher and politician

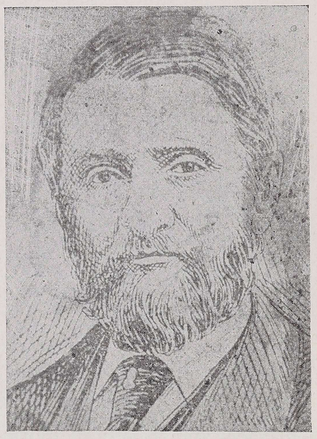

Member of the Virginia House of Delegates for Buckingham and Cumberland counties
- In office 1879–1882

Personal details
- Born: December 25, 1831 Cumberland County, Virginia
- Died: March 30, 1900 (aged 68) Cumberland County
- Party: Republican; Readjuster Party
- Spouse: Mary Agnes Coleman
- Occupation: cobbler, preacher

Shed Dungee (December 25, 1831–March 30, 1900) was a cobbler, preacher and state legislator in Virginia. He served two terms in the Virginia House of Delegates from 1879 to 1882. He was born enslaved and worked as a cobbler and became a preacher.

== Early life ==
Dungee was born enslaved December 25, 1831 in Cumberland County, Virginia to Shed and Harriet Dungee. In the 1860s he trained as a cobbler and worked as one in Cumberland County. He was thought to have been married and had children first while still a slave, and after the American Civil War he married Mary Agnes Coleman on January 7, 1869 as a freeman, with whom he had a daughter and three sons. His early education is unknown but at some point he learned to read and write, became a licensed preacher and helped found the Slate River Colored Baptist Association in 1877.

== Politics ==
Dungee was elected November 1879, to represent Buckingham and Cumberland counties in the Virginia House of Delegates as a Republican. When asked a few weeks later by President Rutherford B. Hayes to stand by the principles of the Republican platform for which he would be protected in return, he declined stating he had grievances at home in Virginia that needed to be addressed. Once back at home he started attending Readjuster Party meetings, and was noted as voting along with the colored Readusters against the Republicans on the issue of State debt. In his first session he introduced a resolution to allow whites and blacks to marry, by repealing the laws outlawing miscegnation, but was outvoted 77 to 10.

In 1881 he campaigned and was elected as a Readjuster again for Buckingham and Cumberland counties beating the Democrat J. B. Ficklen. During this session he sat on the Public Property, on Retrenchment and Economy Committee and the Roads and Internal Navigation Committee. He voted for the establishing what became the Virginia State University and to outlaw the whipping post. He did not stand for a third term but stayed interested in local Readjuster and Republican politics and was a delegate at the Republican State Convention in 1896.

== Death ==
He died March 30, 1900 and was interred in Cumberland County at the Mount Olive Baptist Church cemetery. He wife died in 1918 and was buried alongside him under a new shared gravestone.

== See also ==
- Jesse Dungee
- African American officeholders from the end of the Civil War until before 1900
