= Robert A. Richardson =

American judge

Robert A. Richardson (June 16, 1827 – October 16, 1895) was a Virginia soldier and lawyer who was a member of the Readjuster Party and served for twelve years on the Supreme Court of Virginia (then called the Supreme Court of Appeals).

== Biography ==
Richardson was a native of Charlotte County, Virginia. While still in his teens, he enlisted in the army and fought in the Mexican-American War. Following this, he returned to Virginia and taught in the school in Monroe County (now in West Virginia). He read law books extensively during his hours outside of school and in the early 1850s was appointed Deputy Clerk of the Supreme Court of Appeals at Lewisburg (now in West Virginia). He still pursued the study of law when he was not working. He was admitted to the bar, and shortly after moved to Mercer County to begin practicing law. This was interrupted by military service in the Civil War. After the war, he settled at Marion in Smyth County, where he had a large practice. He became a member of the Readjuster Party and, in February 1882, was elected to the Supreme Court of Appeals. After serving his twelve-year term, he retired in January 1895 and returned to Marion where he died in October 1895.
