= Daniel M. Norton =

American politician

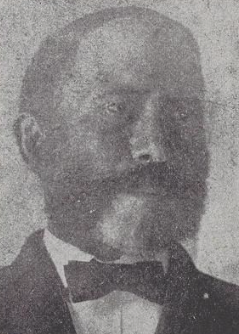
- Daniel M. Norton (later Daniel McNorton)
- Born: c. 1843; Williamsburg, Virginia, U.S.
- Died: 1918 (aged 74–75); Hampton, Virginia, U.S.
- Occupation: Physician
- Title: Delegate, state Senator
- Political party: Republican

Daniel M. Norton, later Daniel McNorton, (c. 1843 – November 29, 1918) was a doctor and state legislator in Virginia. Norton served in the Virginia Constitutional Convention of 1868. He was a member of the Virginia General Assembly, as were his brothers F. S. Norton (1869/71) and Robert Norton (1869-1874, 1876-1883).

== Early life ==
Norton was born in Williamsburg, Virginia, reportedly the son of his enslaved mother and her owner. In his teens, he and another brother Robert escaped to freedom in Troy, New York. Daniel received medical training from a doctor there and thereafter was often called "Doctor Norton”. In January 1860, Norton married his wife Edmonie in Philadelphia. By 1865, the two brothers had become prosperous barbers in Springfield, Massachusetts.

== Career ==
At the end of the American Civil War, Norton returned to Virginia, in their home of York County where he may have had part ownership in the store his brother Robert operated. Establishing himself as a local leader, Daniel testified before Congress in February 1866 that freedmen were not being paid for their work, and vigilantes were a threat to them in the area if federal occupation ended. Although elected three times to serve on the Freedman’s Bureau local court, he was barred by the assistant commissioner for Virginia until a white man took his place.

“Dr. Norton” and brother Robert established a beneficial society named Lone Star that enabled Daniel Norton a political power base in York County. In 1867, Norton was elected to the Virginia Constitutional Convention of 1868. He was the sole delegate elected from the Lower Peninsula district made up of his home district of York County as well as James City County surrounding Norton’s birthplace in Williamsburg.

The Virginia Capitol at Richmond VA where 19th century Conventions met

Following the Convention, Norton continued his involvement in Republican politics, unsuccessfully seeking the party’s nomination for U.S. Congress three times. In the meantime he continued to acquire properties in York County, including much of the property in the African-American community in York County called Slabtown or Uniontown. Daniel Norton married Sarah A. Gant in Muskingum County, Ohio, on December 28, 1871.

A moderate Republican, Norton began an unparalleled career as an African-American state Senator, not only serving during the period following Radical Reconstruction over the sessions 1871/72. 72/73, 77/78, 79/80, and 81/82, but also following the Conservative Democrat’s “redeeming” the state for whites in the sessions of 1883/84, August 1884, 85/86, and March 1887.

During his career was a leader both within the Readjuster Republicans, and African-American Republicans as a splinter group. During his tenure on the Committees on General Laws, on Federal Relations, and on Public Institutions, he sponsored four bills the Assembly passed, and he nominated two county judges whom the Assembly elected. Norton nominated Benjamin W. Lacy to the Supreme Court of Appeals, and presided over the Senate of Virginia on April 7, 1882. During this period Norton won legislation to authorize him, his brother Robert Norton and three others to operate a ferry between Yorktown and Gloucester Point.

Following the white “redeeming” of Virginia in the 1883 elections, Daniel Norton was again reelected. He became a member of the first Board of Visitors for the Virginia Normal and Collegiate Institute (later Virginia State University), and passed a bill providing for an annual eight-week summer session for African-American public school teachers there. Though Norton secured a position as an inspector in the Newport News Customs House as a political appointment, a break with U.S. Senator William Mahone led to the end of Norton's state senate career.

In later years, Norton served as a justice of the peace in Yorktown until 1917. He continued to expand his real estate holdings. By 1894, he not only owned sixty-eight acres in York County, but fourteen and a half lots in Yorktown, including the old customs house.

== Death ==
Daniel M. Norton died of interstitial nephritis in his wife’s hometown of Zanesville, Ohio on November 29, 1918.

== See also ==
- African American officeholders from the end of the Civil War until before 1900

== Bibliography ==
- Gottlieb, Matthew S. "Daniel M. Norton, later Daniel McNorton". Encyclopedia Virginia. Virginia Foundation for the Humanities.
- Pulliam, David Loyd (1901). The Constitutional Conventions of Virginia from the foundation of the Commonwealth to the present time. John T. West, Richmond. ISBN 978-1-2879-2059-5.
- Swem, Earl Greg (1918). A Register of the General Assembly of Virginia, 1776-1918, and of the Constitutional Conventions. David Bottom, Superintendent of Public Printing. ISBN 978-1-3714-6242-0.
