= Jesse Dungee =

American politician

Jesse Dungee (circa 1812 - August 1884) was a shoemaker, leeching practitioner, minister, community leader, and state legislator in Virginia. He was a Republican during his state legislative service. He served in the Virginia House of Delegates from 1871 to 1873.

Dungee was born in King William County. He was of mixed heritage, and he was born outside of slavery. He married and had numerous children. He was related to Shed Dungee who also served in the House. He married Mary Jane Custalo in 1830. John Riley Dungee, an educator, was one of his sons. He was a leader of the Mt. Nebo Baptist Church in West Point, Virginia.

In 1876, a few years after leaving the Virginia House of Delegates, he left the Republican Party and joined the Democratic Party. In an announcement of his party switch, he explained that he desired "full and manly reconciliation" between black and white Virginians. Although he was born outside of slavery, he claimed he was enslaved earlier in his life; this was an attempt, as scholar Stephen Robinson writes, to better connect with black Virginians as a Democrat, a party seen by his contemporaries as elitist.
