= Isaac C. Fowler =

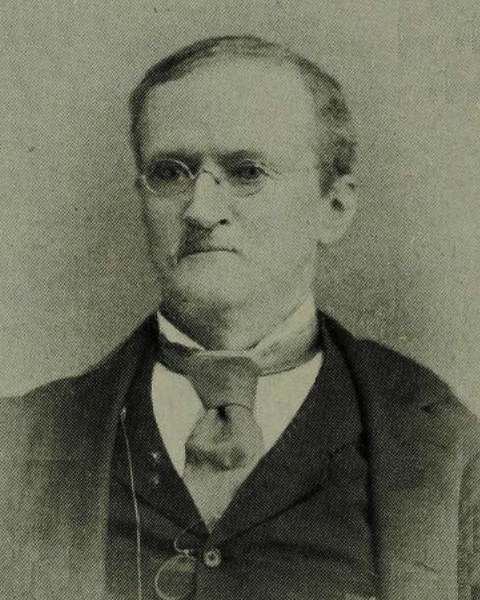
- Fowler in 1901 book

34th Speaker of the Virginia House of Delegates
- In office December 7, 1881 – December 5, 1883
- Preceded by: Benjamin W. Lacy
- Succeeded by: Charles E. Stuart

Member of the Virginia House of Delegates from Washington County
- In office December 7, 1881 – December 5, 1883
- Preceded by: David F. Bailey
- Succeeded by: Daniel Trigg
- In office December 1, 1875 – December 3, 1879
- Preceded by: Seldon Longley
- Succeeded by: David F. Bailey

Mayor of Bristol, Virginia
- In office 1871–1875
- Preceded by: ?
- Succeeded by: ?

Personal details
- Born: Isaac Chapman Fowler; September 2, 1831 Jeffersonville, Virginia, U.S.
- Died: April 29, 1905 (aged 73) Abingdon, Virginia, U.S.
- Party: Republican (1884–1905); Readjuster (1878–1884); Conservative (1870–1878)
- Spouse: Kezia McDonald Chapman (m. 1854)
- Education: Emory and Henry College

Military service
- Allegiance: Confederate States
- Branch/service: Confederate States Army
- Battles/wars: American Civil War

Isaac Chapman Fowler (September 2, 1831, Jeffersonville, Virginia – April 29, 1905) was a Virginia politician. He served as mayor of Bristol, Virginia, from 1871 to 1875, represented Washington County in the Virginia House of Delegates, and served as that body's Speaker from 1881 until 1882 as a member of the Readjuster Party.

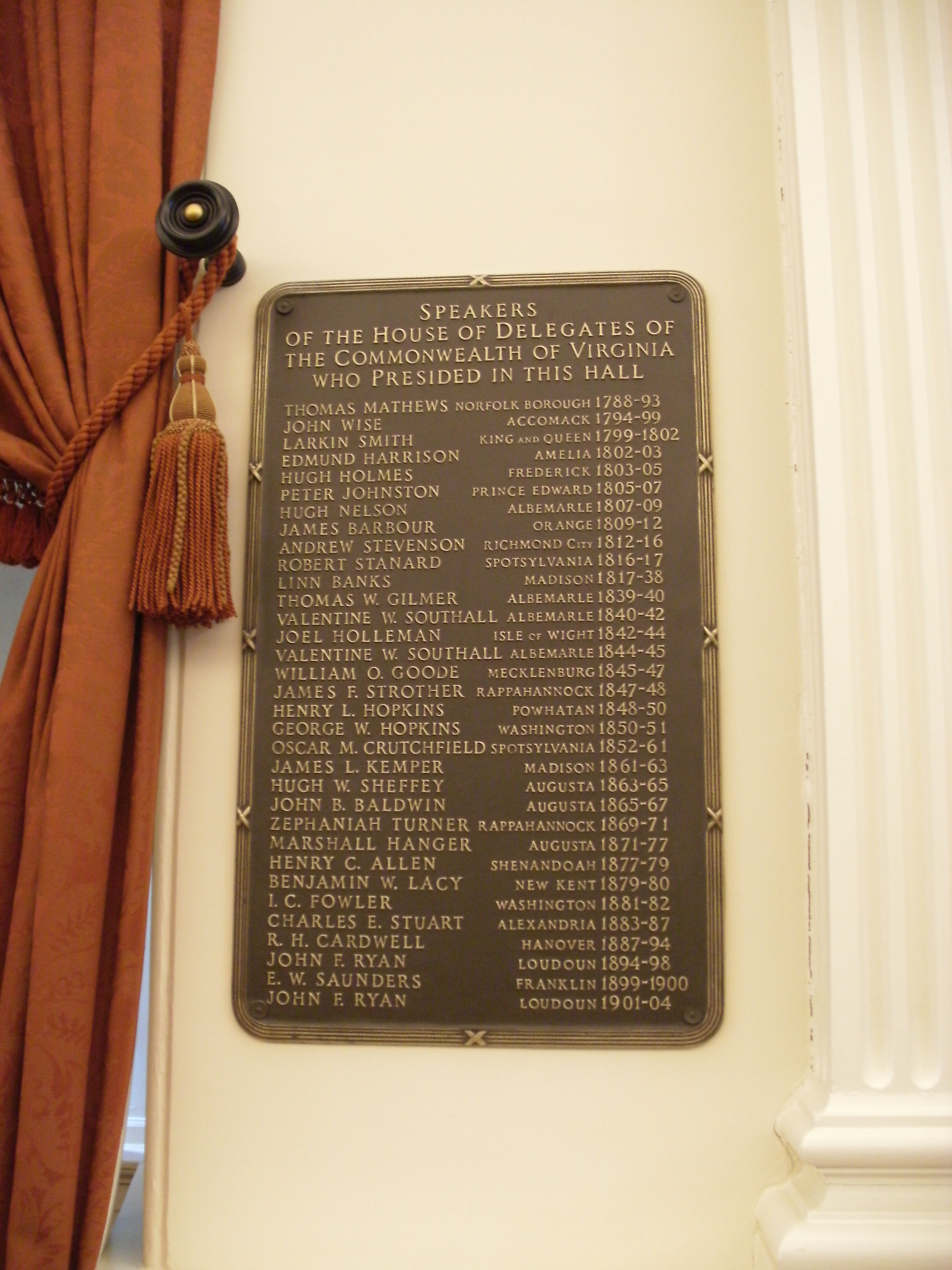
List of former Speakers of the House of Delegates in the old House chamber in the Virginia State Capitol

== Early life and family life ==
Isaac Fowler was born to Thomas and Priscilla Fowler on September 23, 1831, in Tazewell County, Virginia. He attended Emory and Henry College. He married Kezia McDonald Chapman on December 4, 1854. During the Civil War, he worked for the Commissary Department of the Confederate States under John C. Breckinridge. Fowler, along with his brother, Elbert, purchased the Bristol News from A. C. Smith in 1864. He became the paper editor until February 1884.

== Political career ==
Fowler's first delve into politics came when he served as Mayor of Bristol, Virginia, from 1871 to 1875. After his term as mayor was up, he won his first stint in the Virginia General Assembly where he served until 1879. During the 1877–1879 General Assembly meeting, he served as Chairman of the Virginia House of Delegates Schools and Colleges Committee. He won his second stint in 1881 and was voted Speaker of the Virginia House of Delegates during the 1881–1882 General Assembly meeting. As speaker, he oversaw legislation enacted that repealed the state's poll tax as a prerequisite to voting and liberalized appropriations for the state's public school system, which included the creation of Virginia State University, passage of the ReAdjusters debt bill, and reform of tax laws. After his term as speaker was up, he served as Clerk of the U. S. District Court in Abingdon, until shortly before he died in 1904.

== Death and legacy ==
Fowler died on April 6, 1904. He is buried at East Hill Cemetery in Bristol, Virginia.
