= Danville Massacre =

1883 incident in Virginia

The Danville Massacre, also known as the Danville Riot, was a deadly assault on African Americans at a Danville, Virginia market November 3, 1883, and continued for several days after with violent attacks continuing until after the election. The shooting took place during tensions between white supremacists and members of the Readjuster Party. Four African Americans and one white man were killed. A local investigation faulted the African Americans and a U.S. Senate investigation faulted the white supremacists.

In the aftermath of the event, as many blacks were leaving Danville, the Democratic Party regained control at the state and local level, pushing out the biracial Readjuster Party. Democrats forced African Americans out of office and suppressed their voting rights.

== Background ==
The industrial town of Danville, Virginia grew rapidly in the late 19th century, attracting many single workers, and associated gambling, drinking, and prostitution establishments. In 1882 the biracial Readjuster Party had gained control of the city council, causing resentment and even alarm among some white residents; even though the council was still dominated by white members; the city had a majority African-American population. The Readjuster Party had been in power at the state level since 1879.

== Shooting ==
The attack occurred on November 3, 1883, during a market day when African Americans, many tobacco factory workers, bought groceries. As the large crowd gathered, a racially motivated street fight broke out and turned into a shooting, resulting in five men being killed, four of them black.

The violence continued in the days following the shooting and African Americans were attacked, beaten, killed, and kept from voting in the election. The Richmond Dispatch ran a statement the day after the shootings that "These negroes had evidently come to regard themselves as in some sort the rightful rulers of the town. They have been taught a lesson — a dear lesson, it is true ... but nevertheless a lesson which will not be lost upon them, nor upon their race elsewhere in Virginia."

== Aftermath ==
A local commission found African Americans at fault for the violence on November 3, but a US Senate investigation decided that white residents were to blame. No prosecution resulted from either inquiry. Businesses owned by African Americans closed, many moved outside of town, and Democrats retook control of local and state politics after the November 1883 elections (held three days after the event).

White Democratic legislators interpreted the Danville events as more reason to push blacks out of politics. In 1902 the state legislature passed a new constitution that raised barriers to voter registration, effectively disenfranchising most blacks and many poor whites, who had been part of the Readjuster Party. They excluded them from the political system, causing them to be underrepresented and their segregated facilities to be underfinanced.

The Equal Justice Initiative included the deaths in the Danville Riot in its 2015 report of lynchings in the South from 1877 to 1950. There were five lynchings in Danville, the second highest total of any independent city or county in the state, led only by Tazewell with 10.

== See also ==
- Bloody Monday (Danville), protests, arrests, and violence in 1963
