= Boydton Academic and Bible Institute =

Christian school for African Americans

Coordinates: 36°39.77′N 78°24.365′W

Boydton Academic and Bible Institute was a Christian school for African Americans from 1879 to 1935 in Boydton, Virginia. It was established on the site of the Boydton Race Course where the original campus of Randolph–Macon College was built and operated from 1830 until 1868 when it was relocated to Ashland. It is part of the Civil Rights in Education Heritage Trail.

Charles Cullis acquired the former Randolph-Macon campus in 1878 to establish the school. Vernon Johns attended the school. The American Folklife Center has five interviews related to the school and its history.

The University of Michigan has a collection of photographs taken at the school.

== Alumni ==
- Molonket Ole Sempele, Kenyan chief, missionary, and educator
- Vernon Johns
- Mozella Jordan Price, Supervisor of Appomattox County Negro Schools from 1919 to 1963.

== See also ==
- Carver-Price High School
