= 2008 Virginia elections =

- November 4, 2008

The 2008 elections in Virginia were held on November 4, 2008, to determine who would represent the Commonwealth of Virginia in the United States House of Representatives and the United States Senate, as well as elections for the presidency. Local officers, such as county board members and school board members, were also elected.

== Presidential ==
=== Republican candidate selections and activities ===
On February 12, 2008, a Presidential primary decided which candidate would receive Virginia's delegates to the 2008 National Convention. The results were:

2008 Republican Primary
John McCain	241,780	50.99%
Mike Huckabee	188,835	39.83%
Ron Paul	21,799	4.59%
Mitt Romney	16,307	3.43%
Fred D. Thompson	3,493	0.73%
Rudy Giuliani	1,879	0.39%

In a second step, city and county caucuses elected delegates to Congressional District and the State Conventions. The third step was a series of Congressional District conventions held in late April and early May 2008; they elected some of Virginia's delegates to the Republican National Convention. The Republican State Convention (Richmond, Virginia May 30–31, 2008) chose the Republican Senate nominee, twenty-seven (27) delegates, and twenty-seven (27) alternate delegates at large to the 2008 Republican National Convention. Since the Republican primary is winner-take-all, all National Convention delegates must vote for John McCain on the first ballot. The main issues for State Convention delegates was their preference for party chairman and U.S. Senate nominee. James S. Gilmore secured the Senate nomination over Robert G. Marshall by 70 votes out of 10,378. Although Gilmore outspent Marshall by more than 8 to 1, a coalition of anti-abortion activists, libertarians and some moderates from Northern Virginia almost succeeded in nominating Marshall. Later in the day, that coalition elected Delegate Jeffrey M. Frederick as state party chair over incumbent John H. Hager (Jenna Bush's father-in-law).

The Eighth and Tenth Congressional districts chose their congressional candidates in primary elections June 10, 2008.

June 10, 2008 Republican Primaries
8th C.D.	Mark Ellmore	3,286	56.04%	Amit K. Singh	2,577	43.95%
10th C.D.	Frank R. Wolf (incumbent)	16,726	91.73%	Vern McKinley	1,506	8.26%

In October 2008, Virginia's Republican Party chairman Jeffrey M. Frederick compared Democratic presidential nominee Barack Obama to Osama bin Laden because of his association with Bill Ayers. Both had friends who bombed buildings in the United States. A McCain spokeswoman complained Frederick's remarks were "not appropriate."

On November 3, 2008, the Virginia Republican Party charged that local election officials had mailed absentee ballots ten days late to military members overseas. Its lawsuit sought to modify the rule which requires all absentee votes to be received by the time that the polls close in order to give overseas absentee voters and additional 10 days to return their ballots.

For 2008, the Republican Party of Virginia raised $489,024 compared with $2,200,851 for the Democratic party.

=== Democratic candidate selections ===
The 2008 Presidential Preference Primary was held on February 12, 2008. Joe Biden, Hillary Clinton, John Edwards, Dennis Kucinich, Barack Obama, and Bill Richardson all turned in enough signatures to the Virginia State Board of Elections to qualify to run in the Commonwealth. Chris Dodd did not file with the State Board of Elections by the December 14, 5:00 pm deadline.

Delegates to the 2008 National Convention were selected in proportion to the votes gained in the primary. The results of the primary are:

2008 Democratic Primary
Barack Obama	619,515	63.73%
Hillary Clinton	343,177	35.30%
John Edwards	5,109	0.52%
Dennis J. Kucinich	2,335	0.24%
Bill Richardson	1,054	0.10%
Joe Biden	791	0.08%

Each city or county held a caucus to elect delegates to the state convention in proportion to the primary results during the third week of April. The Democratic Party of Virginia will send 103 delegates and 14 alternates to the national convention in Denver, Colorado. Eighteen of the 103 delegates were automatically allocated to party leaders. In May 2008, 54 delegates and 11 alternates were elected at Congressional District Conventions. An additional 20 at large delegates, 11 party leader and elected official delegates, and 3 alternates were elected at the Virginia State Democratic Convention on June 14, 2008, in Hampton, Virginia. The allocation of delegates between the two candidates which received at least 15% of the vote, based on the primary results, are as follows:

Delegate Allocation
Delegate Type	Total	Obama	Clinton
District Level Delegates	54	35	19
District Level Alternates	11	10	1
At-Large Delegates	18	12	6
At-large Alternates	3	2	1
Pledged PLEOs	11	7	4
Unpledged PLEO Delegates	16		
Unpledged Add-on Delegates	2		

In the November 4, 2008 General Election, the Barack Obama / Joe Biden ticket carried the state with 1,897,941 (52.21%) to 1,699,428 (46.75%). Thirty-two percent of that margin came from Arlington County in Northern Virginia. Democrat Mark Warner also defeated former Governor James Gilmore for the United States Senate 2,302,480 (64.69%) to 1,211,654 (34.04%).

For 2008, the Democratic Party of Virginia raised $2,200,851 compared with $489,024 for the Republican party.

=== General election ===
Virginia was won by the Democratic nominee Barack Obama by a 6.3% margin of victory. In 2008, Virginia, for the first time since 1964, cast its electoral college presidential votes for a Democrat, Barack Obama.

== Congress ==
=== Senate ===
Mark Warner won the open seat by more than 31 percentage points, defeating Republican Jim Gilmore and becoming the first Democrat to win the Class II Senate seat since 1966.

== Local elections ==
Local officers, such as county board members and school board members were also elected.

== See also ==
- 2008 United States Senate election in Virginia
- 2008 United States House of Representatives elections in Virginia
- 2008 United States presidential election in Virginia
