= Billy O'Brien (politician) =

American politician

Member of the Virginia House of Delegates from the 83rd district
- In office January 12, 1983 – January 8, 1992
- Preceded by: None (district created)
- Succeeded by: Leo Wardrup

Member of the Virginia House of Delegates from the 38th district
- In office January 13, 1982 – January 12, 1983 Serving with Buster O'Brien, Owen Pickett, Glenn McClanan, and Melvin Spence
- Preceded by: Fred Creekmore; Tom Forehand
- Succeeded by: Nora Anderson Squyres

Member of the Virginia House of Delegates from the 42nd district
- In office January 9, 1974 – January 13, 1982
- Succeeded by: Robert Bloxom

Personal details
- Born: Joseph William O'Brien, Jr. April 20, 1929 Parsons, Kansas
- Died: November 9, 2012 (aged 83) Virginia Beach, Virginia
- Party: Democratic
- Spouse: Joyce Ann O'Brien
- Children: Marlene Castellow; Joseph William O'Brien, III
- Education: University of North Carolina; University of Virginia
- Occupation: educator, businessperson
- Committees: Education

Military service
- Branch/service: United States Marine Corps
- Rank: Captain

Joseph William O'Brien, Jr. (April 20, 1929 – November 9, 2012) was an American politician. A Democrat, he served in the Virginia House of Delegates 1974–1992.

== Early life, education, career ==
O'Brien was born in Parsons, Kansas. He was a star athlete at Woodrow Wilson High School in Portsmouth, Virginia, and received a football scholarship to the University of North Carolina. He received a B.A. degree from that school and a master's degree from the University of Virginia.

He served in the United States Marine Corps, reaching the rank of captain. He then became a teacher in the Norfolk County (later the city of Chesapeake) public schools, serving as football coach at Great Bridge High School 1955–1974.

O'Brien and his wife, were married from c.1954 until his death. They had two children, Marlene Castellow and Joseph Willian O'Brien, III.

== Political career ==
O'Brien was first elected to the House of Delegates in 1973 from the 42nd district, a single-member district that covered Virginia Beach, Chesapeake and Portsmouth. In 1981, after redistricting, he was elected from the 38th district, a multimember district for Virginia Beach only. From 1983 on, after a court decision mandating single-member districts, he represented the 83rd district in the northern part of Virginia Beach.

In 1976, O'Brien was the Democratic nominee for the United States House of Representatives in Virginia's 4th congressional district. He lost to the Republican incumbent, Robert W. Daniel, Jr., 53.03%-46.97%.

O'Brien was an early proponent of the Virginia State Lottery, which was created in 1987.

O'Brien decided not to run for reelection in 1991. His seat was taken by Republican Leo Wardrup.

== Death ==
O'Brien died in Virginia Beach on November 9, 2012.
