= Frederick H. Creekmore =

American politician

Fred Creekmore

Member of the Virginia House of Delegates from the 78th district
- In office January 12, 1983 – January 10, 1990
- Preceded by: None (district created)
- Succeeded by: Randy Forbes

Member of the Virginia House of Delegates from the 36th district
- In office January 13, 1982 – January 12, 1983 Serving with Tom Forehand
- Preceded by: George W. Jones
- Succeeded by: Ken Plum

Member of the Virginia House of Delegates from the 38th district
- In office 1974–1982
- Preceded by: L. Cleaves Manning
- Succeeded by: Billy O'Brien; Buster O'Brien; Owen B. Pickett, Glenn McClanan; Melvin M. Spence

Personal details
- Born: Frederick Hillary Creekmore; November 12, 1937 (age 88) Norfolk, Virginia, U.S.
- Party: Democratic
- Education: University of Richmond (B.A., J.D.)
- Occupation: Attorney

Frederick Hillary Creekmore Sr. (born November 12, 1937) is a politician and former Democratic member of the Virginia House of Delegates. He represented the 78th district, which included the city of Chesapeake, from 1974 to 1990.

He studied at the University of Richmond, and the T.C. Williams School of Law.

Creekmore served ten years as a judge on Virginia's First Judicial Circuit, starting with his appointment in 1998 and ending with his retirement on February 1, 2008.

Creekmore is an elder of Great Bridge Presbyterian Church.
