= Melvin M. Spence =

American politician (1927–2014)

Melvin Spence
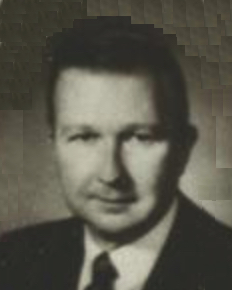

Member of the Virginia House of Delegates from the 38th district
- In office January 13, 1982 – January 12, 1983 Serving with Buster O'Brien, Owen Pickett, Glenn McClanan, and Billy O'Brien
- Preceded by: Frederick H. Creekmore; Tom Forehand
- Succeeded by: Nora Anderson Squyres

Personal details
- Born: Melvin Merritt Spence; May 9, 1927 Norfolk, Virginia, U.S.
- Died: June 28, 2014 (aged 87) Virginia Beach, Virginia, U.S.
- Party: Republican
- Spouse: Betsy Winesett
- Education: Virginia Tech (BS)

Military service
- Allegiance: United States
- Branch/service: United States Navy
- Years of service: 1945
- Battles/wars: World War II

Melvin Merritt Spence (May 9, 1927 – June 28, 2014) was an American politician who served as a member of the Virginia House of Delegates from 1982 to 1983. Elected in 1981, he had to run for reelection the next year after a three-judge panel of the United States District Court for the Eastern District of Virginia found the state's multi-member districts to violated the Equal Protection Clause. He was defeated in the newly-drawn 81st district by Owen B. Pickett.
