= Virginia's 14th Senate district =

American legislative district

- District map following the 2021 redistricting
- Demographics: 68% White; 18% Black/African American; 4% Asian; 5% Hispanic
- Population: 213,771
- Registered voters: 154,807

Virginia's 14th Senate district elects one of the 40 members of the Virginia Senate, which is the upper house of the state's bicameral legislature, the Virginia General Assembly.. It was most previously represented by Republican John Cosgrove from his victory in a 2013 special election to replace fellow Republican Harry Blevins to his resignation September 2023. It is currently represented by Lamont Bagby.

Following the 2021 Virginia redistricting, the district was formed from parts of the 9th, 10th, 12th, and 16th Virginia Senate districts.

== Geography ==
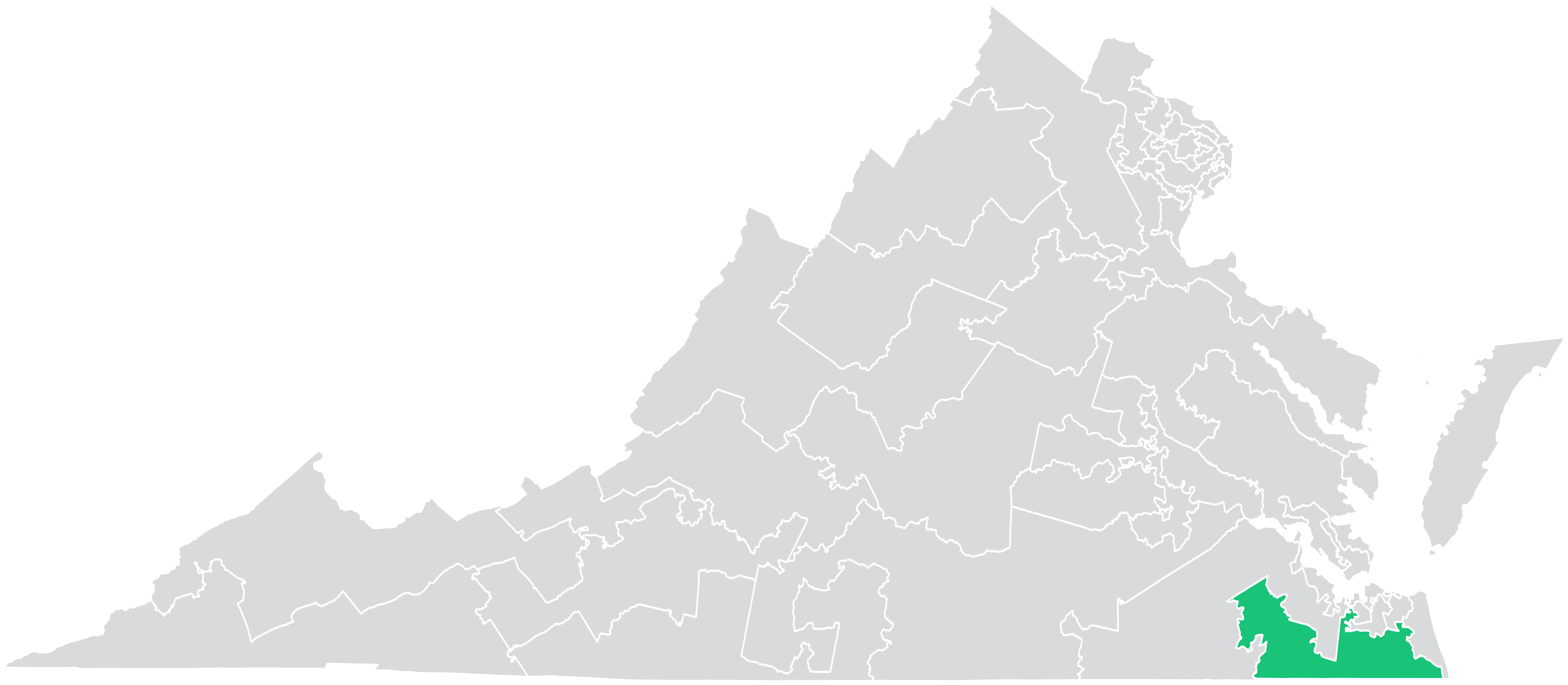
District map from before the 2021 redistricting

District 14 is located in central Virginia, and contains parts of Henrico County and Richmond City.

The district is located entirely within Virginia's 4th congressional district, and overlaps with the 77th, 78th, 79th, and 80th districts of the Virginia House of Delegates.

== Recent election results ==
=== 2019 ===
2019 Virginia Senate election, District 14
Party	Candidate	Votes	%
Republican	John Cosgrove (incumbent)	36,370	60.2
Democratic	Rebecca Raveson	23,949	39.6
Total votes		60,460	100
Republican hold			

=== 2015 ===
2015 Virginia Senate election, District 14
Primary election
Party	Candidate	Votes	%
Republican	John Cosgrove (incumbent)	2,586	64.6
Republican	William Haley	1,417	35.4
Total votes		4,003	100
General election
Republican	John Cosgrove (incumbent)	15,371	92.4
Total votes		16,637	100
Republican hold			

=== 2013 special ===
2013 Virginia Senate special election, District 14
Party	Candidate	Votes	%
Republican	John Cosgrove	2,254	87.9
Democratic	Kerry Holmes	228	8.9
Total votes		2,563	100
Republican hold			

=== 2011 ===
2011 Virginia Senate election, District 14
Party	Candidate	Votes	%
Republican	Harry Blevins (incumbent)	16,063	96.0
Total votes		16,738	100
Republican hold			

=== Federal and statewide results ===
Year	Office	Results
2020	President	Trump 58.1–40.1%
2017	Governor	Gillespie 56.1–42.8%
2016	President	Trump 58.2–36.8%
2014	Senate	Gillespie 58.0–39.7%
2013	Governor	Cuccinelli 55.1–38.8%
2012	President	Romney 59.5–39.3%
2012	Senate	Allen 58.3–41.7%

== Historical results ==
All election results below took place prior to 2011 redistricting, and thus were under different district lines.

=== 2007 ===
2007 Virginia Senate election, District 14
Party	Candidate	Votes	%
Republican	Harry Blevins (incumbent)	13,402	70.8
Libertarian	W. Donald Tabor, Jr.	5,455	28.8
Total votes		18,923	100
Republican hold			

=== 2003 ===
2003 Virginia Senate election, District 14
Party	Candidate	Votes	%
Republican	Harry Blevins (incumbent)	12,878	70.8
Total votes		13,216	100
Republican hold			

=== 2001 special ===
2001 Virginia Senate special election, District 14
Party	Candidate	Votes	%
Republican	Harry Blevins	3,096	97.9
Total votes		3,163	100
Republican hold			

=== 1999 ===
1999 Virginia Senate election, District 14
Party	Candidate	Votes	%
Republican	Randy Forbes (incumbent)	25,193	97.9
Total votes		25,731	100
Republican hold			

=== 1997 special ===
1997 Virginia Senate special election, District 14
Party	Candidate	Votes	%
Republican	Randy Forbes	16,889	69.1
Democratic	James Wheaton	7,526	30.8
Total votes		24,449	100
Republican hold			

=== 1995 ===
1995 Virginia Senate election, District 14
Party	Candidate	Votes	%
Republican	Mark Earley (incumbent)	22,571	79.9
Libertarian	Mark Walker	5,654	20.0
Total votes		28,262	100
Republican hold			
