= Senator Blevins =

Senator Blevins may refer to:

- Harry Blevins (1935–2018), Virginia State Senate
- Patricia Blevins (1954–2026), Delaware State Senate
- Walter Blevins (born 1950), Kentucky State Senate
