= 2001 Virginia's 4th congressional district special election =

- June 19, 2001

Virginia's 4th congressional district
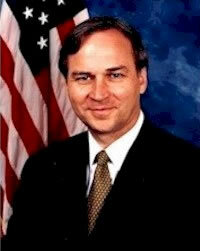

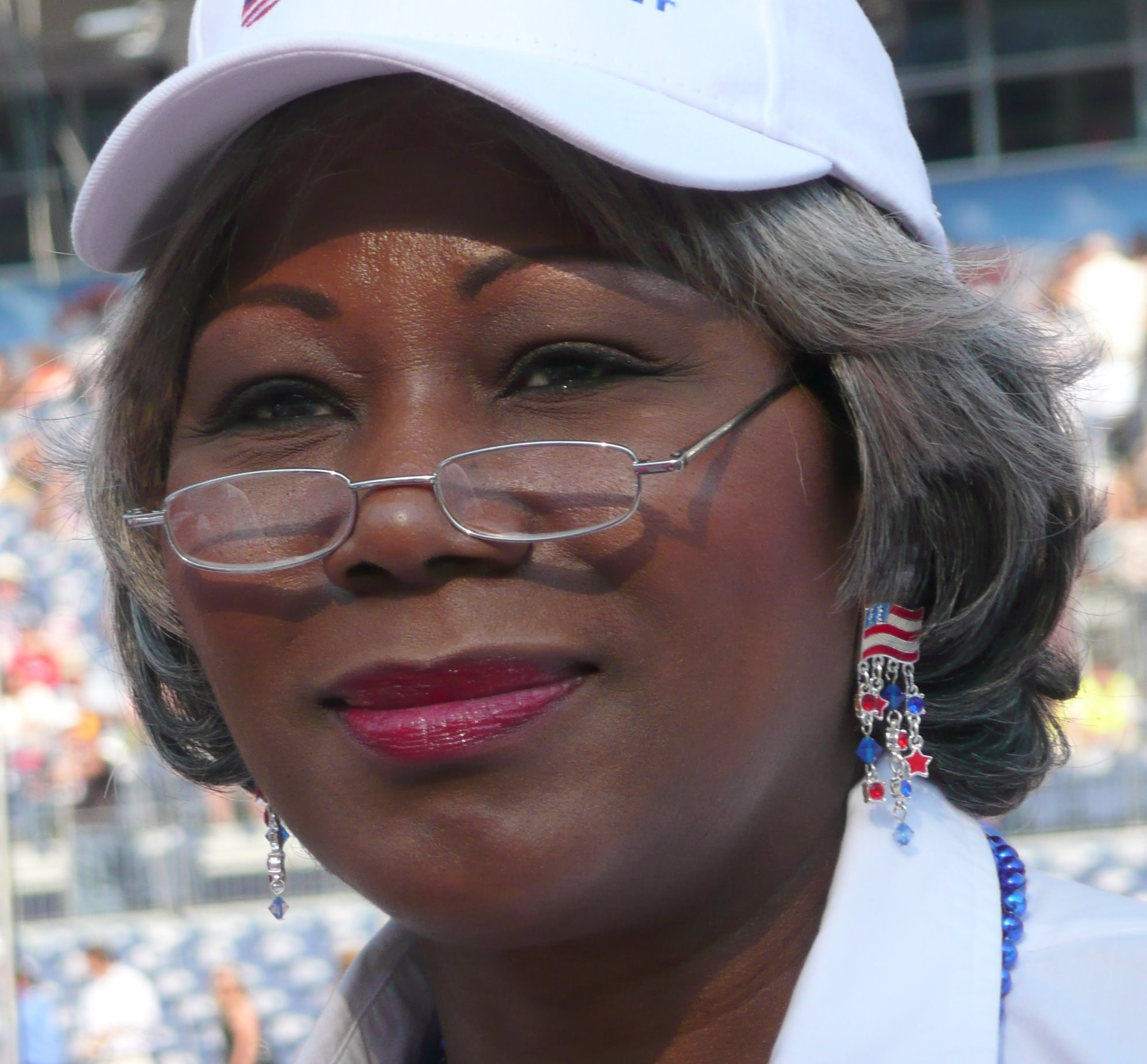
| Nominee | Randy Forbes | L. Louise Lucas |
| Party | Republican | Democratic |
| Popular vote | 70,917 | 65,190 |
| Percentage | 52.02% | 47.82% |
- Forbes: 50–60% 60–70% 70–80% 80–90% Lucas: 50–60% 60–70% 70–80% 80–90% 90–100%
U.S. Representative before election
Norman Sisisky
Democratic
Elected U.S. Representative
Randy Forbes
Republican

The 2001 Virginia's 4th congressional district special election was held on June 19, 2001, following the death of Democratic Congressman Norman Sisisky on March 29, 2001. State Senator Randy Forbes won the Republican nomination over State Delegate Kirk Cox and faced the Democratic nominee, State Senator L. Louise Lucas, in the general election. Hopewell Mayor Anthony Zevgolis, a Republican, originally planned to run in the special election as an independent, but ended his campaign and supported Forbes. In the general election, Forbes narrowly defeated Lucas, and flipped the seat to Republican control.

== Republican nomination ==
Shortly after Sisisky's death, State Senator Randy Forbes, who was running in the Republican primary for lieutenant governor, ended his campaign to run in the special election after he was recruited by national Republicans. State Delegate Kirk Cox and Emporia Mayor F. Woodrow Harris also announced that they would seek the Republican nomination. State Delegate Riley Ingram considered running, but he instead opted to support Cox's campaign.

The Republican convention was held on Saturday, April 28, 2001, at Prince George High School. The vote at the convention was contentious, but Forbes ultimately defeated Cox.

=== Candidates ===
- Randy Forbes, State Senator
- Kirk Cox, State Delegate
- F. Woodrow Harris, Mayor of Emporia

==== Declined ====
- Riley Ingram, State Delegate

=== Convention vote ===
Republican convention results
| Party | Candidate | Votes | % |
|---|---|---|---|
| Republican | Randy Forbes | 467.77 | 58.40% |
| Republican | Kirk Cox | 332.75 | 41.54% |
| Republican | F. Woodrow Harris | 0.48 | 0.06% |
| Total votes | | 801 | 100.00% |

== Democratic nomination ==
State Senator L. Louise Lucas announced that she would run in the special election, citing her experience as a shipfitter and arguing that she understood the needs of the district. She was joined in the campaign by Jo Ann Walthall, a businesswoman and member of the Alberta Town Council. Though Mark Sisisky, the son of Congressman Sisisky, considered launching a campaign to succeed his father, he ultimately declined to do so. Lucas was the frontrunner for the Democratic nomination, and ultimately won the convention vote by a wide margin over Walthall.

=== Candidates ===
- L. Louise Lucas, State Senator
- Jo Ann Walthall, member of the Alberta Town Council

==== Declined ====
- Mark Sisisky, businessman, son of Congressman Sisisky

=== Convention vote ===
Democratic convention vote
| Party | Candidate | Votes | % |
|---|---|---|---|
| Democratic | L. Louise Lucas | 286 | 96.62% |
| Democratic | Jo Ann Walthall | 10 | 3.38% |
| Total votes | | 296 | 100.00% |

== General election ==
=== Candidates ===
- Randy Forbes (Republican)
- L. Louise Lucas (Democratic)

==== Dropped out ====
- Anthony J. Zevgolis, Mayor of Hopewell (independent) (endorsed Forbes)

=== Results ===
2001 Virginia's 4th congressional district special election
| Party | Candidate | Votes | % |
|---|---|---|---|
| Republican | Randy Forbes | 70,917 | 52.02% |
| Democratic | L. Louise Lucas | 65,190 | 47.82% |
| Write-ins | | 208 | 0.15% |
| Total votes | | 136,315 | 100.00% |
| Republican gain from Democratic | | | |
