= Senator Forbes =

Senator Forbes may refer to:

- Malcolm Forbes (1919–1990), New Jersey State Senate
- Randy Forbes (born 1952), Virginia State Senate
