= John Cosgrove (Virginia politician) =

American politician from Virginia

Member of the Virginia Senate from the 14th district
- In office August 16, 2013 – September 30, 2023
- Preceded by: Harry Blevins
- Succeeded by: Christie Craig (Redistricing)

Member of the Virginia House of Delegates from the 78th district
- In office January 9, 2002 – August 16, 2013
- Preceded by: Harry Blevins
- Succeeded by: Jay Leftwich

Personal details
- Born: June 7, 1954 (age 72) Montgomery, Alabama
- Party: Republican
- Spouse: Sue Ann Culpepper
- Children: Michael, Brian
- Education: Tidewater Community College; Old Dominion University
- Profession: Electronics engineer
- Committees: Education and Health; Rehabilitation and Social Services; Transportation
- Website: www.johncosgrove.org

Military service
- Branch/service: United States Navy
- Years of service: 1987–1998
- Unit: United States Naval Reserve

John A. Cosgrove (born June 7, 1954) is an American politician. On August 16, 2013, he was sworn in as a member of the Senate of Virginia, representing the 14th district, after winning an August 6 special election to replace the retiring Harry Blevins.

From 2002 to 2013 Cosgrove served in the Virginia House of Delegates, representing the 78th district in the city of Chesapeake. Cosgrove is a member of the Republican Party.

Cosgrove is a Virginia State Leader for the American Legislative Exchange Council (ALEC), which writes conservative model bills for state legislators to introduce.

Cosgrove is an advocate for gun rights. In 2017, the Virginia Citizens Defense League named him one of the most pro-gun politicians in the state. In 2017, Cosgrove mistakenly left his handgun unattended in an assembly meeting room.

In September 2023 Cosgrove resigned from the Virginia Senate after being appointed by Governor Glenn Youngkin to a position at the Virginia Marine Resources Commission.

Virginia House of Delegates
Preceded by Harry Blevins	Member of the Virginia House of Delegates from the 78th district 2002–2013	Succeeded by Jay Leftwich
Senate of Virginia
Preceded by Harry Blevins	Member of the Virginia Senate from the 14th district 2013–2023	Succeeded by Lamont Bagby
