= 2008 United States House of Representatives elections in Virginia =

- November 4, 2008

All 11 Virginia seats to the United States House of Representatives
	Majority party	Minority party
Party	Democratic	Republican
Last election	3 seats, 41.23%	8 seats, 53.23%%
Seats before	3	8
Seats won	6	5
Seat change	▲3	▼3
Popular vote	1,852,788	1,590,687
Percentage	53.01%	45.51%
Swing	▲11.78%	▼7.72%

Democratic
50–60%
60–70%
70–80%
80–90%
>90%
Republican
40–50%
50–60%
60–70%
70–80%

The 2008 congressional elections in Virginia were held on November 4, 2008, to determine who would represent the Commonwealth of Virginia in the United States House of Representatives, coinciding with the presidential and senatorial elections. Representatives were elected for two-year terms in the 111th Congress from January 3, 2009, until January 3, 2011. Primary elections were held on June 10, 2008.

Virginia had eleven seats in the House, apportioned according to the 2000 United States census. Democrats flipped the 2nd, 5th, and 11th districts, flipping their 3–8 deficit into a 6–5 majority, their first since 1998. As of 2024, this is the last time that Democrats were elected to the 5th or 9th congressional districts. This was also the last time until 2018 that Democrats won the majority of House seats in Virginia.

== Overview ==
=== Statewide ===
Party	Candidates	Votes		Seats		
Party	Candidates	No.	%	No.	+/–	%
Democratic	11	1,852,788	53.01	5	▲3	54.55
Republican	9	1,590,687	45.51	4	▼3	45.45
Independent Greens	2	14,100	0.40	0	Steady	0.0
Independents	2	13,870	0.40	0	Steady	0.0
Libertarian	1	5,265	0.15	0	Steady	0.0
Write-in	11	18,645	0.53	0	Steady	0.0
Total		3,495,355	100.0	11	Steady	100.0

Popular vote
Democratic	53.01%
Republican	45.51%
Independent Greens	0.40%
Other	1.08%

House seats
Democratic	54.55%
Republican	45.45%

=== By district ===
Results of the 2008 United States House of Representatives elections in Virginia by district:

District	Democratic		Republican		Others		Total		Result
District	Votes	%	Votes	%	Votes	%	Votes	%	Result
District 1	150,432	41.75%	203,839	56.58%	6,021	1.67%	360,292	100.0%	Republican hold
District 2	141,857	52.40%	128,486	47.46%	368	0.14%	270,711	100.0%	Democratic gain
District 3	239,911	97.02%	0	0.00%	7,377	2.98%	247,288	100.0%	Democratic hold
District 4	135,041	40.37%	199,075	59.51%	405	0.12%	334,521	100.0%	Republican hold
District 5	158,810	50.09%	158,083	49.86%	183	0.06%	317,076	100.0%	Democratic gain
District 6	114,367	36.61%	192,350	61.57%	5,675	1.82%	312,392	100.0%	Republican hold
District 7	138,123	37.10%	233,531	62.72%	683	0.18%	372,337	100.0%	Republican hold
District 8	222,986	67.94%	97,425	29.68%	7,786	2.37%	328,197	100.0%	Democratic hold
District 9	207,306	97.07%	0	0.00%	6,264	2.93%	213,570	100.0%	Democratic hold
District 10	147,357	38.83%	223,140	58.80%	8,983	2.37%	379,480	100.0%	Republican hold
District 11	196,598	54.69%	154,758	43.05%	8,135	2.26%	359,491	100.0%	Democratic gain
Total	1,852,788	53.01%	1,590,687	45.51%	51,880	1.48%	3,495,355	100.0%	

== District 1 ==
2008 Virginia's 1st congressional district election
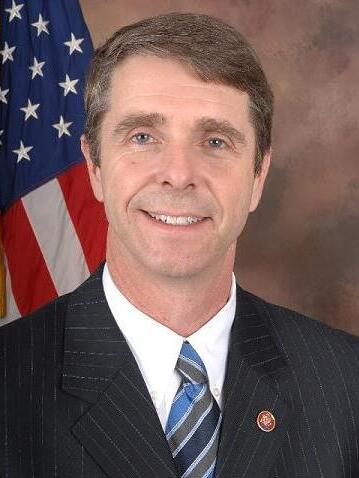

Nominee	Rob Wittman	Bill Day
Party	Republican	Democratic
Popular vote	203,839	150,452
Percentage	56.6%	41.8%
- County and independent city results Wittman: 50–60% 60–70% 70–80% Day: 50–60% 60–70%
U.S. Representative before election
Rob Wittman
Republican
Elected U.S. Representative
Rob Wittman
Republican

Incumbent Republican Rob Wittman, who had represented the district since 2007, ran for re-election. He was elected with 60.8% of the vote in 2007 and the district had a PVI of R+9.

=== Republican primary ===
A Westmoreland County resident, former State Board of Health field director for the Division of Shellfish Sanitation and past member of the Virginia House of Delegates, Wittman had only held the seat since January 2008, having won the special election to succeed deceased Congresswoman Jo Ann Davis. He had taken up many of her causes, including the FairTax, veterans' interests and getting rid of the remainder of the ghost fleet stationed at the James River. Like Davis, he is also introducing legislation to allow Virginia to regulate the importation of trash from other states.

==== Candidates ====
===== Nominee =====
- Rob Wittman, incumbent U.S. Representative

=== Democratic primary ===
The Democratic Party of Virginia held its convention on May 17 in Williamsburg, Virginia and selected Keith Hummel, the only person running for the Democratic nomination at the time. Only four votes were cast to not nominate anyone. A Westmoreland County physician and self-described "populist Democrat", Hummel also operates a farm and winery. The issues he was running on included enacting trade and tax policies to protect American jobs and American interests (rather than those of a few multinational corporations); using the military for defense rather than offensively; providing better health care and other benefits to veterans; and universal health care.

==== Candidates ====
===== Nominee =====
- Bill Day, mental health counselor and nominee for state delegate in 2007

=== Libertarian primary ===
Anarcho-capitalist Catlett resident Nathan Larson, filed a declaration of candidacy on May 7, and was certified for the ballot on June 6. He was nominated by the Libertarian Party 1st Congressional District Convention on June 3 and endorsed by the Independent Greens of Virginia on June 12.

The main issues he was running on are free market roads and transit privatization, which he proposed as the solution to DC Metropolitan area traffic congestion, recently ranked the second-worst in the country. He supported auctioning off the Interstate Highway System and rail systems such as Amtrak to private investors. Larson also sought to dissolve the U.S. military and establish a competitive market for defense services.

==== Candidates ====
===== Nominee =====
- Nathan Larson, accountant and cannabis reform activist

=== General election ===
==== Campaign ====
The candidates appeared on Cathy Lewis's TV program, What Matters, on October 15. The candidates held a spirited and well-attended debate on October 22 in which differing opinions on health care and the economy played a central role. Wittman defended his vote against the bailout package, while Day said he would have voted for it, and Larson said that it would have been better for the economy if the banks had been allowed to fail. On Medicare, Wittman advocated restructuring the system, while Day argued for expanding it and Larson shocked the audience by calling for its abolition.

==== Endorsements ====
Bill Day (D)

Labor unions

- AFL-CIO

==== Predictions ====
Source	Ranking	As of
The Cook Political Report	Safe R	November 6, 2008
Rothenberg	Safe R	November 2, 2008
Sabato's Crystal Ball	Safe R	November 6, 2008
Real Clear Politics	Safe R	November 7, 2008
CQ Politics	Safe R	November 6, 2008

==== Results ====
Wittman won the election, 56.6 to 41.8.

Virginia's 1st congressional district election, 2008
Party	Candidate	Votes	%
Republican	Rob Wittman	203,839	56.6
Democratic	Bill Day	150,432	41.8
Libertarian	Nathan Larson	5,265	1.5
Write-in		756	0.2
Majority		53,407	14.8
Total votes		360,292	100.0
Republican hold			

== District 2 ==
2008 Virginia's 2nd congressional district election
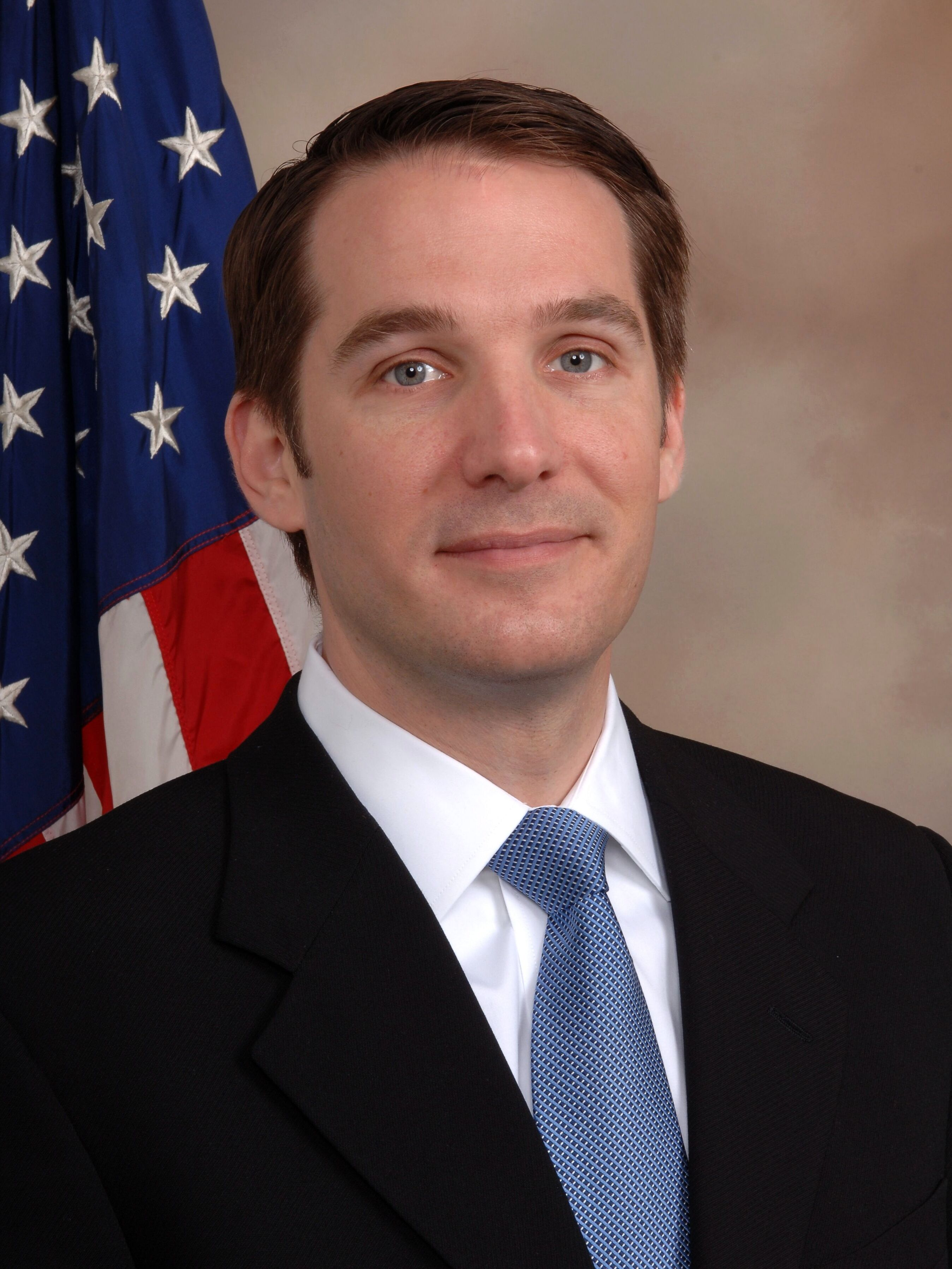

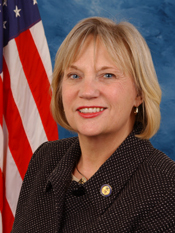
Candidate	Glenn Nye	Thelma Drake
Party	Democratic	Republican
Popular vote	141,857	128,486
Percentage	52.4%	47.5%
- County and independent city results Nye: 50–60%
U.S. Representative before election
Thelma Drake
Republican
Elected U.S. Representative
Glenn Nye
Democratic

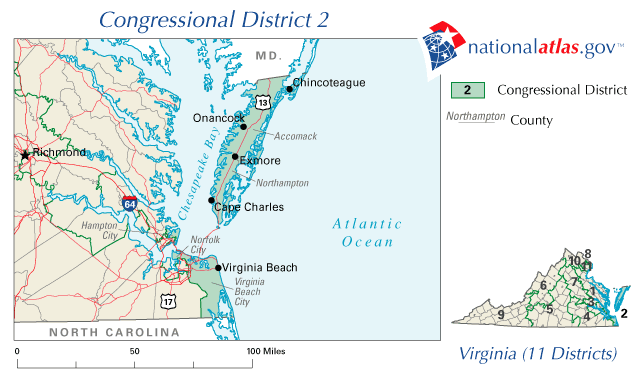

The District includes Virginia's two largest cities--Norfolk and Virginia Beach, and the Virginia portion of the Eastern Shore. Incumbent Republican Thelma Drake, who had represented the district since 2005, ran for re-election. She was elected with 51.3% of the vote in 2006 and the district had a PVI of R+6.

In 2006, Drake survived a bid from Democrat Phil Kellam by only 51.27% to 48.45%. In 2004, Drake received 55% of the vote in this Virginia Beach-based district, which was won by George W. Bush with 57% to 42% for John Kerry in 2004. But in 2005 Democratic Governor Tim Kaine won the district by 50% to 47%. In 2006, Drake may have been hurt by the downfall of Republican U.S. Senator George Allen, who narrowly lost to Democrat Jim Webb, an ex-Republican and former Navy Secretary under Ronald Reagan. (Allen carried the district 51%–48%.)

=== Republican primary ===
==== Candidates ====
===== Nominee =====
- Thelma Drake, incumbent U.S. Representative

=== Democratic primary ===
==== Candidates ====
===== Nominee =====
- Glenn Nye, businessman and former foreign service officer

=== General election ===
==== Endorsements ====
Glenn Nye (D)

Labor unions

- AFL-CIO

Organizations

- Democratic Congressional Campaign Committee "Red to Blue" Program
- Planned Parenthood Action Fund

Newspapers and publications

- The Virginian-Pilot

==== Polling ====
Poll source	Date(s) administered	Sample size (Note: Key: A – all adults RV – registered voters LV – likely voters V – unclear)	Margin of error	Thelma Drake (R)	Glenn Nye (D)	Undecided
Bennett, Petts & Normington (D–Nye)	October 14–15, 2008	400 (LV)	±4.9%	47%	42%	11%
Research 2000 (Daily Kos)	October 6–8, 2008	400 (LV)	±5.0%	51%	37%	12%
Bennett, Petts & Normington (D–Nye)	September 21–22, 2008	400 (LV)	±4.9%	45%	40%	15%
Bennett, Petts & Normington (D–Nye)	May 5–6, 2008	400 (LV)	±5.0%	48%	32%	20%

==== Predictions ====
Source	Ranking	As of
The Cook Political Report	Tossup	November 6, 2008
Rothenberg	Tossup	November 2, 2008
Sabato's Crystal Ball	Lean R	November 6, 2008
Real Clear Politics	Lean R	November 7, 2008
CQ Politics	Lean R	November 6, 2008

==== Results ====
Virginia's 2nd congressional district election, 2008
Party	Candidate	Votes	%
Democratic	Glenn Nye	141,857	52.4
Republican	Thelma Drake (incumbent)	128,486	47.5
Write-in		368	0.1
Majority		13,371	4.9
Total votes		270,711	100.0
Democratic gain from Republican			

== District 3 ==
2008 Virginia's 3rd congressional district election
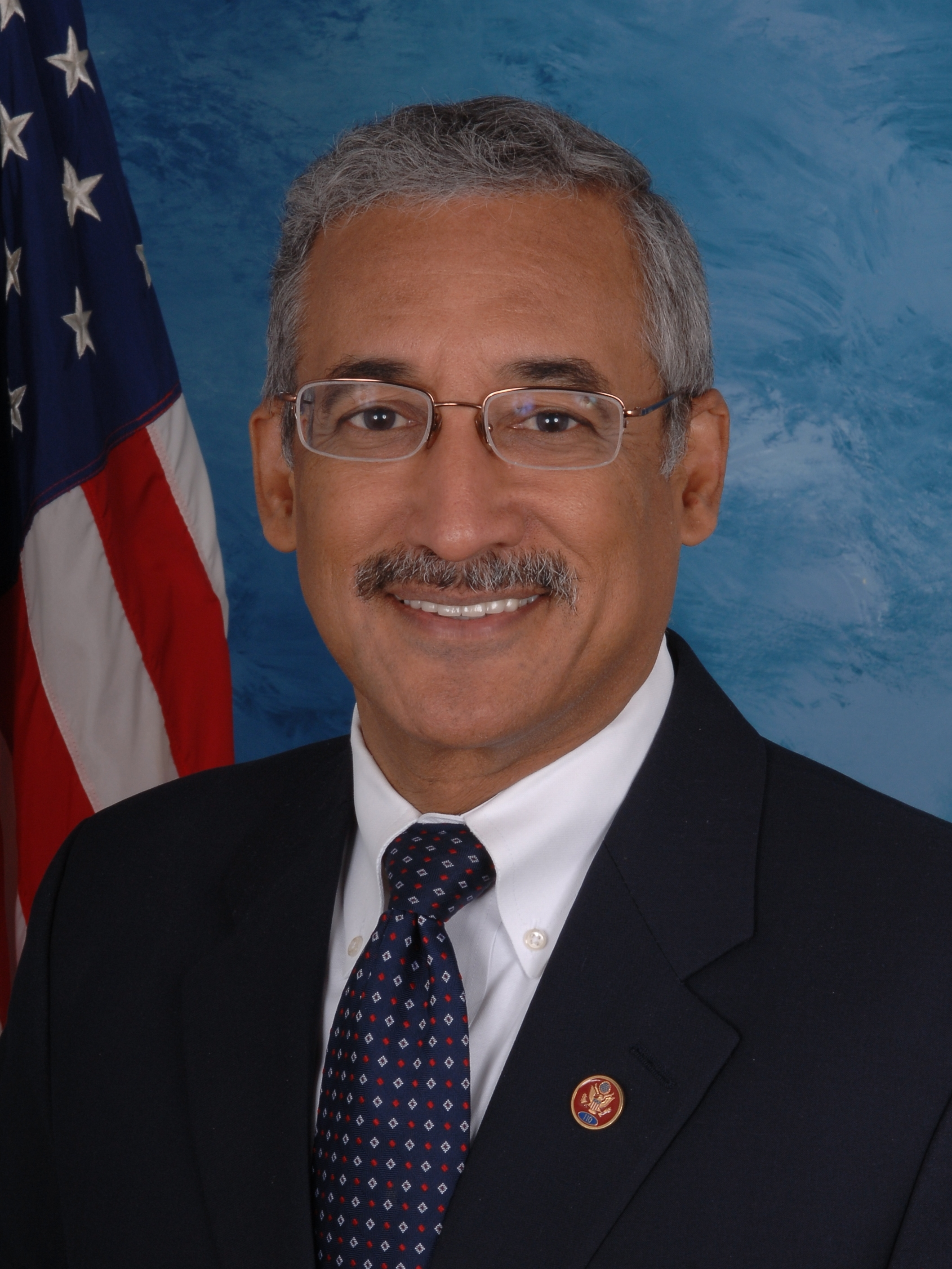
Nominee	Bobby Scott
Party	Democratic
Popular vote	239,911
Percentage	97.0%
U.S. Representative before election
Bobby Scott
Democratic
Elected U.S. Representative
Bobby Scott
Democratic

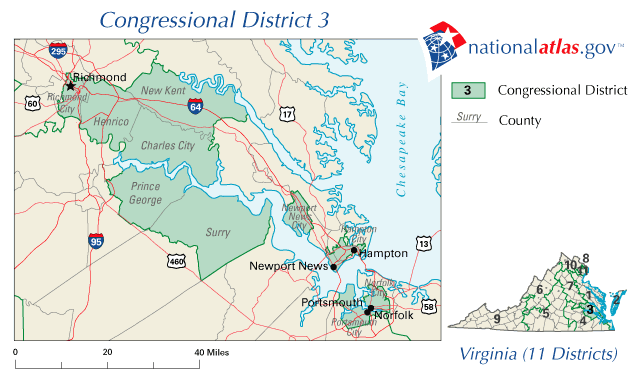

The District runs from Hampton Roads to Richmond. Incumbent Democrat Bobby Scott, who had represented the district since 1993, ran for re-election. He was re-elected with 96.1% of the vote in 2006 and the district had a PVI of D+18. That year Democrat Webb carried 68% of the district in his Senate race. In 2005 Democrat Tim Kaine won the district by 71% to 27% in his gubernatorial race.

=== Democratic primary ===
==== Candidates ====
===== Nominee =====
- Bobby Scott, incumbent U.S. Representative

=== Republican primary ===
No Republicans filed to run.

=== General election ===
==== Endorsements ====
Bobby Scott (D)

Labor unions

- AFL-CIO

Organizations

- Citizens for Global Solutions
- Planned Parenthood Action Fund

==== Predictions ====
Source	Ranking	As of
The Cook Political Report	Safe D	November 6, 2008
Rothenberg	Safe D	November 2, 2008
Sabato's Crystal Ball	Safe D	November 6, 2008
Real Clear Politics	Safe D	November 7, 2008
CQ Politics	Safe D	November 6, 2008

==== Results ====
Virginia's 3rd congressional district election, 2008
Party	Candidate	Votes	%
Democratic	Bobby Scott (incumbent)	239,911	97.0
Write-in		7,377	3.0
Majority		232,534	94.0
Total votes		247,288	100.0
Democratic hold			

- Race ranking and details from CQ Politics
- Campaign contributions from OpenSecrets

== District 4 ==
2008 Virginia's 4th congressional district election
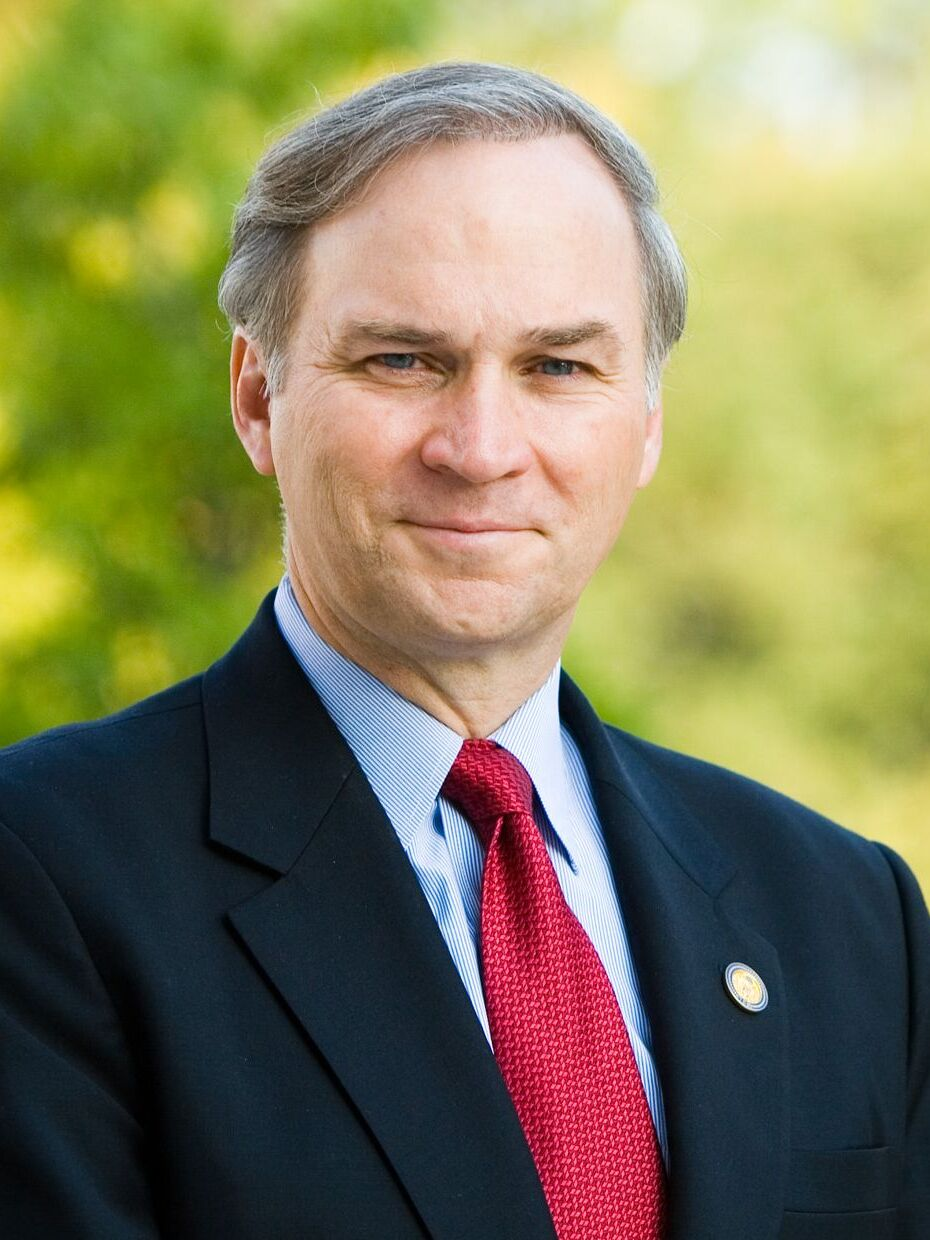
Nominee	Randy Forbes
Party	Republican
Popular vote	199,075
Percentage	59.5%
U.S. Representative before election
Randy Forbes
Republican
Elected U.S. Representative
Randy Forbes
Republican

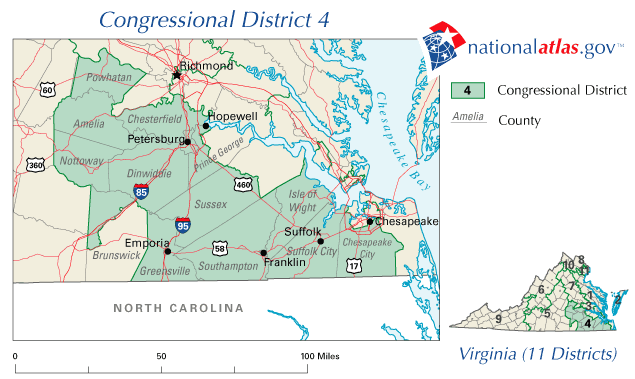

The District lies in southeastern Virginia. Incumbent Republican Randy Forbes, who had represented the district since 2001, ran for re-election. He was re-elected with 76.1% of the vote in 2006 and the district had a PVI of R+5. In 2006 Democrat Webb lost the district 45%–54% in his Senate race. In 2005 Democrat Tim Kaine lost the district by 48.3% to 49.6% in his gubernatorial race.

=== Republican primary ===
==== Candidates ====
===== Nominee =====
- Randy Forbes, incumbent U.S. Representative

=== Democratic primary ===
==== Candidates ====
===== Nominee =====
- Andrea Miller, IT Director, digital strategist and former Regional Coordinator for Dennis Kucinich's presidential campaign

=== General election ===
==== Endorsements ====
Andrea Miller (D)

Labor unions

- AFL-CIO

Organizations

- Progressive Democrats of America

==== Predictions ====
Source	Ranking	As of
The Cook Political Report	Safe R	November 6, 2008
Rothenberg	Safe R	November 2, 2008
Sabato's Crystal Ball	Safe R	November 6, 2008
Real Clear Politics	Safe R	November 7, 2008
CQ Politics	Safe R	November 6, 2008

==== Results ====
Virginia's 4th congressional district election, 2008
Party	Candidate	Votes	%
Republican	Randy Forbes (incumbent)	199,075	59.5
Democratic	Andrea Miller	135,041	40.4
Write-in		405	0.1
Majority		64,034	19.1
Total votes		334,521	100.0
Republican hold			

- Race ranking and details from CQ Politics
- Campaign contributions from OpenSecrets
- Miller campaign website

== District 5 ==
2008 Virginia's 5th congressional district election
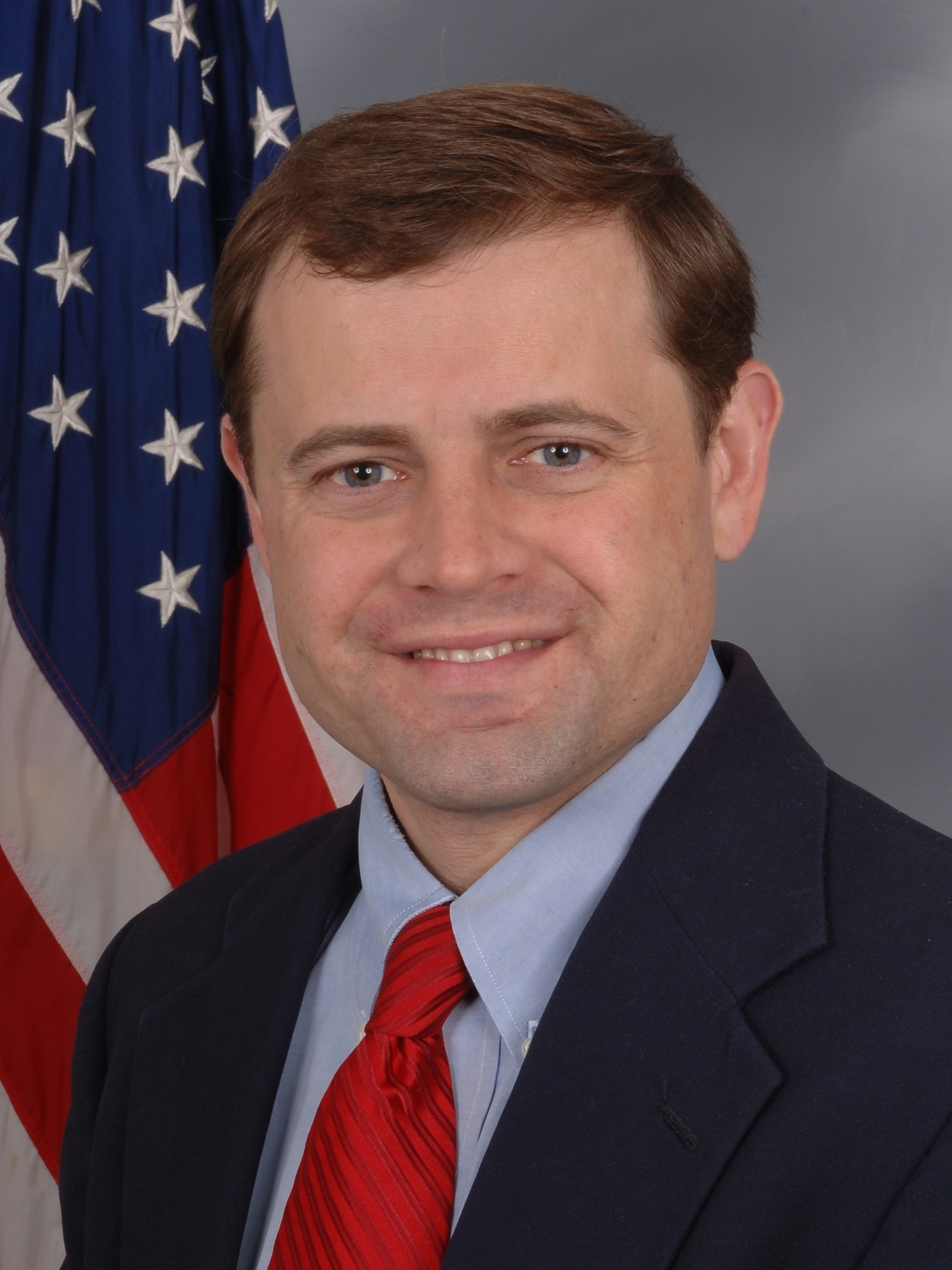

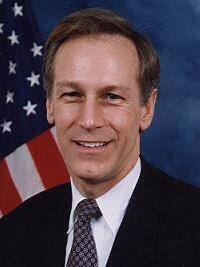
Candidate	Tom Perriello	Virgil Goode
Party	Democratic	Republican
Popular vote	158,810	158,083
Percentage	50.09%	49.86%
- Perriello: 50–60% 60–70% 70–80% 80–90% 90–100% Goode: 50–60% 60–70% 70–80% 80–90%
U.S. Representative before election
Virgil Goode
Republican
Elected U.S. Representative
Tom Perriello
Democratic

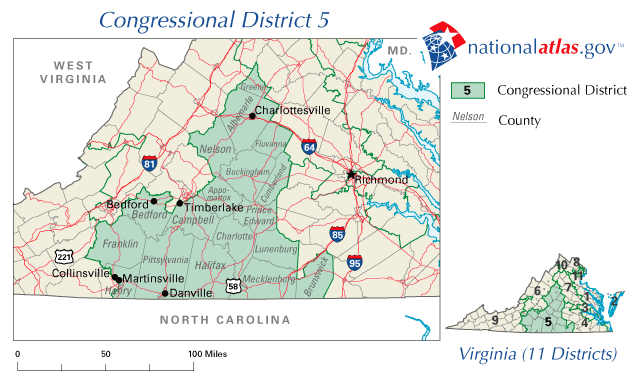

The District lies in southern and central Virginia. Incumbent Republican Virgil Goode, who had represented the district since 1997, ran for re-election. He was re-elected with 59.1% of the vote in 2006 and the district had a PVI of R+6. Democrat Webb lost the district 45%–54% in his Senate race. In 2005 Democrat Tim Kaine won the district by 49.6% to 48.4% in his gubernatorial race. Goode originally won his seat as a Democrat in 1996, voted for President Clinton's impeachment in 1998, became an independent in 2000, and then joined the Republican Party in 2002. He became the first Republican to represent the district since 1889.

=== Republican primary ===
==== Candidates ====
===== Nominee =====
- Virgil Goode, incumbent U.S. Representative

=== Democratic primary ===
==== Candidates ====
===== Nominee =====
- Tom Perriello, attorney and diplomat

=== General election ===
==== Campaign ====
The Democratic Congressional Campaign Committee considered Goode a "targeted Republican", based partly on Perriello's early fundraising. On August 1, the DCCC named Perriello as one of its Red to Blue candidates.

==== Endorsements ====
Virgil Goode (R)

Organizations

- Eagle Forum
Tom Perriello (D)

Labor unions

- AFL-CIO

Organizations

- Citizens for Global Solutions
- Democratic Congressional Campaign Committee "Red to Blue" Program

==== Polling ====
Poll source	Date(s) administered	Sample size	Margin of error	Virgil Goode (R)	Tom Perriello (D)	Sherman Wichter (IG)	Undecided
SurveyUSA (WDBJ-TV)	October 30–November 2, 2006	640 (LV)	±4.0%	50%	47%	–	3%
Benenson Strategy Group (D–Perriello)	October 7–9, 2006	400 (LV)	±4.9%	48%	40%	–	12%
SurveyUSA (WDBJ-TV)	October 6–7, 2006	680 (LV)	±3.8%	55%	42%	–	3%
SurveyUSA (WDBJ-TV/WJLA-TV)	August 10–12, 2006	615 (LV)	±3.9%	64%	30%	1%	5%
Benenson Strategy Group (D–Perriello)	July 7, 2006	? (LV)	±4.9%	56%	31%	–	13%

==== Predictions ====
Source	Ranking	As of
The Cook Political Report	Lean R	November 6, 2008
Rothenberg	Lean R	November 2, 2008
Sabato's Crystal Ball	Lean R	November 6, 2008
Real Clear Politics	Lean R	November 7, 2008
CQ Politics	Lean R	November 6, 2008

==== Results ====
Democrat Perriello defeated Republican incumbent Goode 50.1% to 49.9%. A recount was conducted and Perriello was finally certified as the winner by 727 of 316,893 votes on December 17. This was the closest House race in 2008.

Virginia's 5th congressional district election, 2008
Party	Candidate	Votes	%
Democratic	Tom Perriello	158,810	50.1
Republican	Virgil Goode (incumbent)	158,083	49.9
Write-in		183	0.1
Majority		727	0.2
Total votes		317,076	100.0
Democratic gain from Republican			

- Race ranking and details from CQ Politics
- Campaign contributions from OpenSecrets
- Goode (R-i) vs Perriello (D) graph of poll results at Pollster.com

== District 6 ==
2008 Virginia's 6th congressional district election
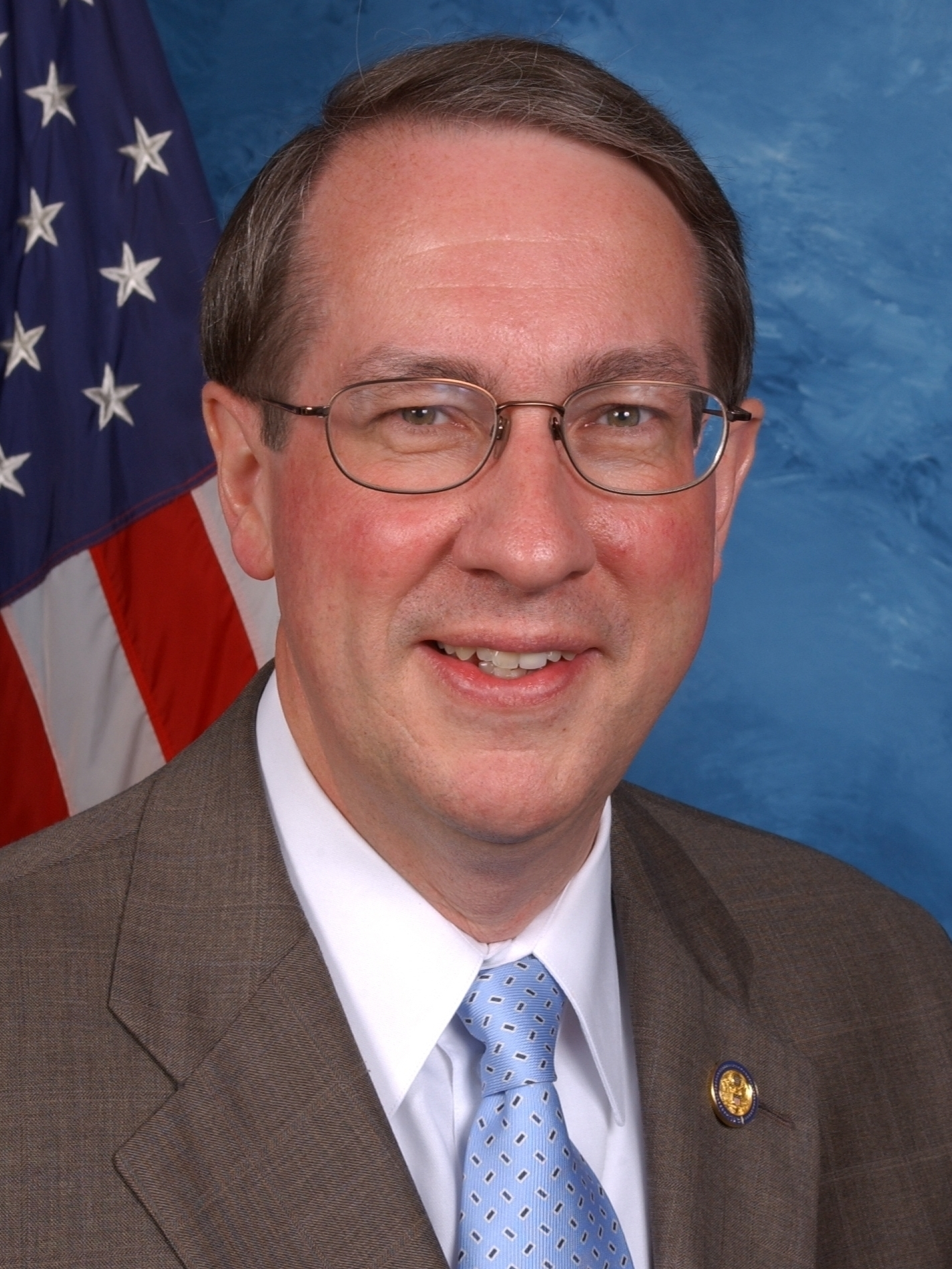

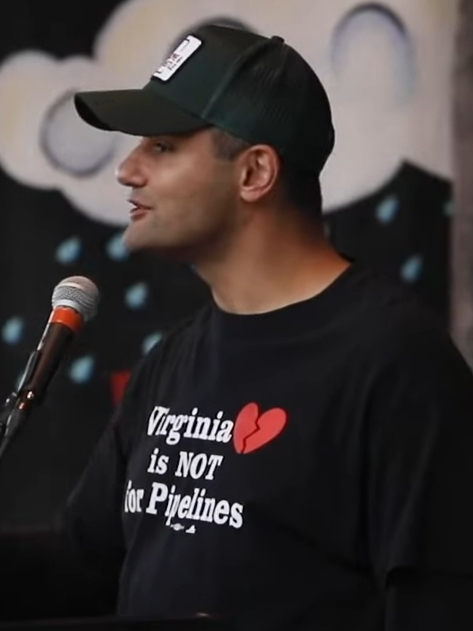
Candidate	Bob Goodlatte	Sam Rasoul
Party	Republican	Democratic
Popular vote	192,350	114,367
Percentage	61.6%	36.6%
- County and independent city results Goodlatte: 50–60% 60–70% 70–80% Rasoul: 50–60%
U.S. Representative before election
Bob Goodlatte
Republican
Elected U.S. Representative
Bob Goodlatte
Republican

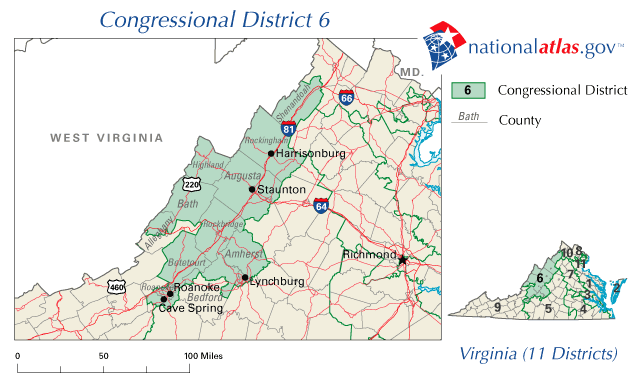

The District lies in western Virginia. Incumbent Republican Bob Goodlatte, who had represented the district since 1993, ran for re-election. He was re-elected with 75.1% of the vote in 2006 and the district had a PVI of R+11. Democrat Webb lost the district 40%–58% in his Senate race. In 2005 Democrat Tim Kaine lost the district by 44% to 53% in his gubernatorial race.

=== Republican primary ===
==== Candidates ====
===== Nominee =====
- Bob Goodlatte, incumbent U.S. Representative

=== Democratic primary ===
==== Candidates ====
===== Nominee =====
- Sam Rasoul, small business entrepreneur

===== Withdrawn =====
- Drew Richardson

=== General election ===
==== Endorsements ====
Sam Rasoul (D)

Labor unions

- AFL-CIO

==== Polling ====
Poll source	Date(s) administered	Sample size	Margin of error	Bob Goodlatte (R)	Sam Rasoul (D)	Janice Lee Allen (I)	Undecided
SurveyUSA (WDBJ-TV/WJLA-TV)	August 11–13, 2006	592 (LV)	±4.0%	59%	30%	3%	7%

==== Predictions ====
Source	Ranking	As of
The Cook Political Report	Safe R	November 6, 2008
Rothenberg	Safe R	November 2, 2008
Sabato's Crystal Ball	Safe R	November 6, 2008
Real Clear Politics	Lean R	November 7, 2008
CQ Politics	Safe R	November 6, 2008

==== Results ====
Virginia's 6th congressional district election, 2008
Party	Candidate	Votes	%
Republican	Bob Goodlatte (incumbent)	192,350	61.6
Democratic	Sam Rasoul	114,367	36.6
Independent	Janice Lee Allen	5,413	1.7
Write-in		262	0.1
Majority		77,983	25.0
Total votes		312,392	100.0
Republican hold			

- Race ranking and details from CQ Politics
- Campaign contributions from OpenSecrets
- Rasoul campaign website
- Allen campaign website

== District 7 ==
2008 Virginia's 7th congressional district election
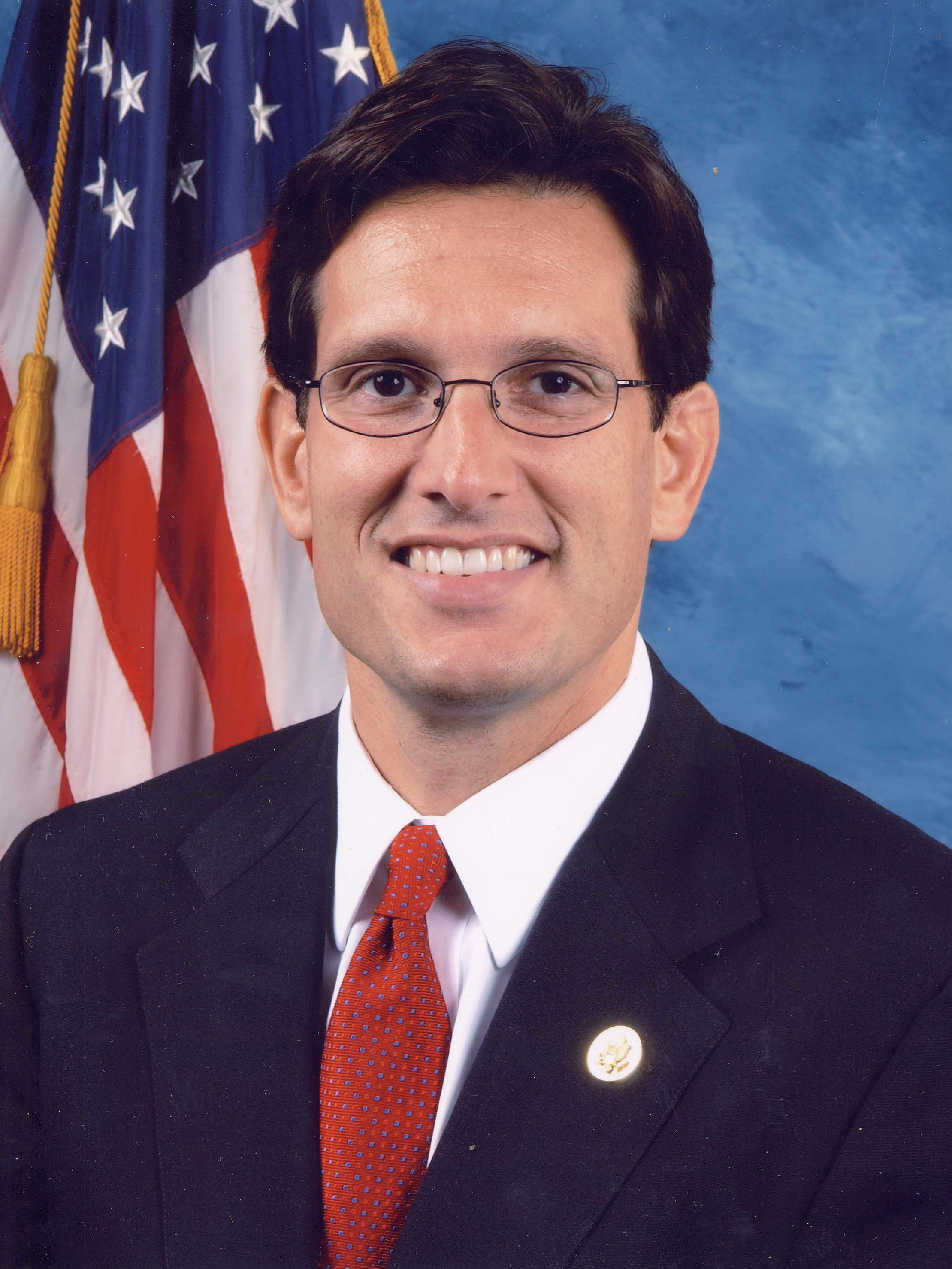

Nominee	Eric Cantor	Anita Hartke
Party	Republican	Democratic
Popular vote	233,531	138,123
Percentage	62.7%	37.1%
- County and independent city results Cantor: 50–60% 60–70% 70–80% Hartke: 50–60%
U.S. Representative before election
Eric Cantor
Republican
Elected U.S. Representative
Eric Cantor
Republican

The 7th District included western parts of Richmond, as well as its nearby suburbs in Henrico County, but otherwise is largely rural. Incumbent Republican Eric Cantor, who had represented the district since 2002, ran for re-election. He was re-elected with 63.8% of the vote in 2006 and the district had a PVI of R+11.

=== Republican primary ===
==== Candidates ====
===== Nominee =====
- Eric Cantor, incumbent U.S. Representative

=== Democratic primary ===
Hartke, 48, a resident of Amissville, Virginia. Her stated positions included improvements on the National Energy Policy by investing in alternative energy in order to reduce the use of foreign oil and fossil fuels. She also supported universal health care as well as gradual withdrawal of troops from Iraq. She also supported reform of the controversial No Child Left Behind Act and increasing funding to the public school system as well as hoping to end student college loan rates in excess of 20%.

==== Candidates ====
===== Nominee =====
- Anita Hartke, real estate broker, chair of the Culpeper County Democratic Committee and daughter of former Indiana US Senator Vance Hartke

=== General election ===
==== Endorsements ====
Eric Cantor (R)

Organizations

- Eagle Forum
Anita Hartke (D)

Labor unions

- AFL-CIO

==== Predictions ====
Source	Ranking	As of
The Cook Political Report	Safe R	November 6, 2008
Rothenberg	Safe R	November 2, 2008
Sabato's Crystal Ball	Safe R	November 6, 2008
Real Clear Politics	Safe R	November 7, 2008
CQ Politics	Safe R	November 6, 2008

==== Results ====
Virginia's 7th congressional district election, 2008
Party	Candidate	Votes	%
Republican	Eric Cantor (incumbent)	233,531	62.7
Democratic	Anita Hartke	138,123	37.1
Write-in		683	0.2
Majority		95,408	25.6
Total votes		372,337	100.0
Republican hold			

== District 8 ==
2008 Virginia's 8th congressional district election
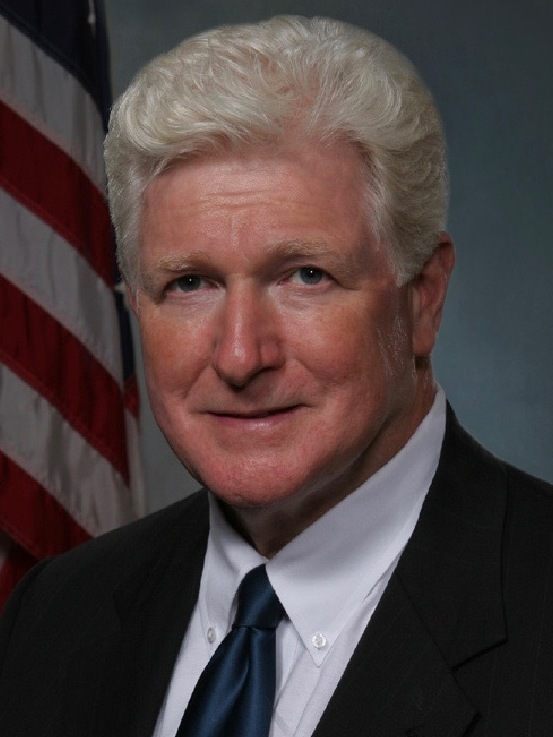
Nominee	Jim Moran
Party	Democratic
Popular vote	222,986
Percentage	67.9%
- County and independent city results Moran: 60–70%
U.S. Representative before election
Jim Moran
Democratic
Elected U.S. Representative
Jim Moran
Democratic

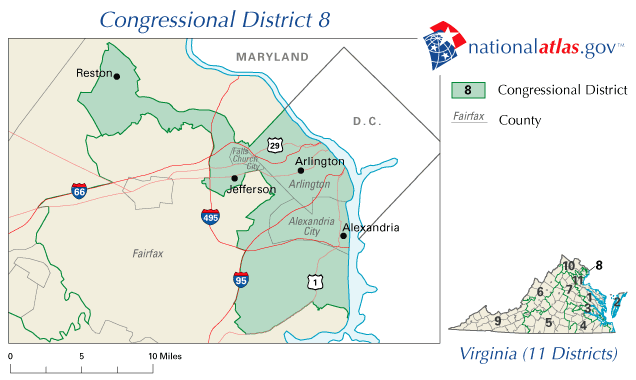

The District lies in heavily suburban Northern Virginia. Incumbent Democrat Jim Moran, who had represented the district since 1985, ran for re-election. He was re-elected with 66.4% of the vote in 2006 and the district had a PVI of D+14. That year Democrat Webb won the district 69%–30% in his Senate race. In 2005 Democrat Tim Kaine won the district by 70% to 28% in his gubernatorial race.

=== Democratic primary ===
==== Candidates ====
===== Nominee =====
- Jim Moran, incumbent U.S. Representative

===== Eliminated in primary =====
- Matthew Famiglietti

==== Results ====
In the June 10 primary election, Moran defeated Famiglietti, with 87% of the vote.

==== Results ====
Democratic primary results
Party	Candidate	Votes	%
Democratic	Jim Moran (incumbent)	11,792	87.0
Democratic	Matthew Famiglietti	1,764	13.0
Total votes		13,556	100.0

=== Republican primary ===
==== Candidates ====
===== Nominee =====
- Mark Ellmore, mortgage lender and candidate for this seat in 2006

===== Eliminated in primary =====
- Amit Singh, small businessman

==== Endorsements ====
Amit Singh

Organizations

- Republican Liberty Caucus

==== Results ====
Republican primary results
Party	Candidate	Votes	%
Republican	Mark Ellmore	3,286	56.0
Republican	Amit Singh	2,577	44.0
Total votes		5,863	100.0

=== General election ===
==== Endorsements ====
Jim Moran (D)

Labor unions

- AFL-CIO

Organizations

- Citizens for Global Solutions
- Planned Parenthood Action Fund

==== Predictions ====
Source	Ranking	As of
The Cook Political Report	Safe D	November 6, 2008
Rothenberg	Safe D	November 2, 2008
Sabato's Crystal Ball	Safe D	November 6, 2008
Real Clear Politics	Safe D	November 7, 2008
CQ Politics	Safe D	November 6, 2008

==== Results ====
Virginia's 8th congressional district election, 2008
Party	Candidate	Votes	%
Democratic	Jim Moran (incumbent)	222,986	67.9
Republican	Mark Ellmore	97,425	29.7
Independent Greens	J. Ron Fisher	6,829	2.1
Write-in		957	0.3
Majority		125,561	38.3
Total votes		328,197	100.0
Democratic hold			

- Race ranking and details from CQ Politics
- Campaign contributions from OpenSecrets

== District 9 ==
2008 Virginia's 9th congressional district election
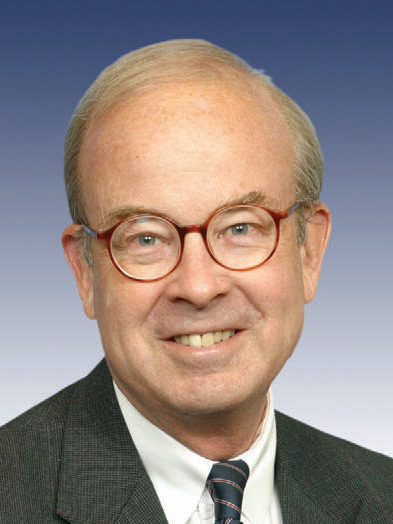
Candidate	Rick Boucher
Party	Democratic
Popular vote	207,306
Percentage	97.1%
- County and independent city results Boucher: >90%
U.S. Representative before election
Rick Boucher
Democratic
Elected U.S. Representative
Rick Boucher
Democratic

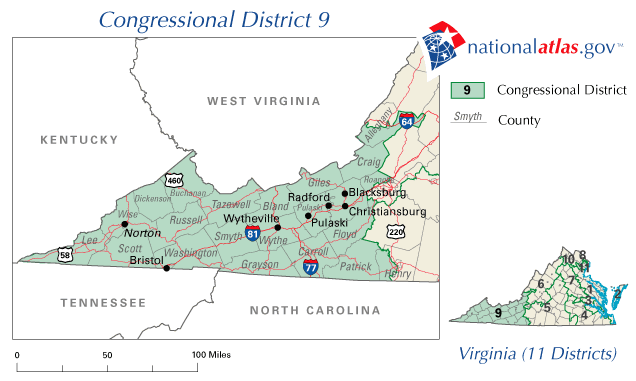

The District covers much of Southwest Virginia. Incumbent Democrat Rick Boucher, who had represented the district since 1983, ran for re-election. He was re-elected with 67.8% of the vote in 2006 and the district had a PVI of R+7. Democrat Webb lost the district 44%–55% in his Senate race. In 2005 Democrat Tim Kaine lost the district by 43% to 55% in his gubernatorial race.

=== Democratic primary ===
==== Candidates ====
===== Nominee =====
- Rick Boucher, incumbent U.S. Representative

=== Republican primary ===
No Republicans filed to run.

=== General election ===
==== Endorsements ====
Rick Boucher (D)

Labor unions

- AFL-CIO

Organizations

- Planned Parenthood Action Fund

==== Predictions ====
Source	Ranking	As of
The Cook Political Report	Safe D	November 6, 2008
Rothenberg	Safe D	November 2, 2008
Sabato's Crystal Ball	Safe D	November 6, 2008
Real Clear Politics	Safe D	November 7, 2008
CQ Politics	Safe D	November 6, 2008

==== Results ====
Virginia's 9th congressional district election, 2008
Party	Candidate	Votes	%
Democratic	Rick Boucher (incumbent)	207,306	97.1
Write-in		6,264	2.9
Majority		201,042	94.1
Total votes		213,570	100.0
Democratic hold			

- Race ranking and details from CQ Politics
- Campaign contributions from OpenSecrets

== District 10 ==
2008 Virginia's 10th congressional district election
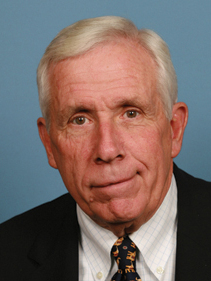
Nominee	Frank Wolf
Party	Republican
Popular vote	223,140
Percentage	58.8%
- County and independent city results Wolf: 40–50% 50–60% 60–70% 70–80%
U.S. Representative before election
Frank Wolf
Republican
Elected U.S. Representative
Frank Wolf
Republican

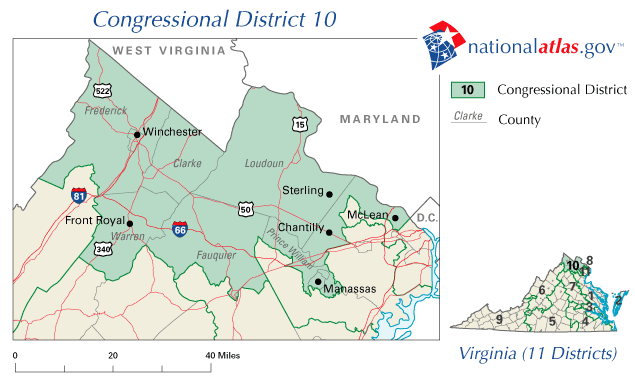

The District lies in Northern and northwestern Virginia. It covers Loudoun, Prince William and parts of Fairfax and Fauquier counties, as well as Manassas. Incumbent Republican Frank Wolf, the Dean of the Virginia congressional delegation, who had represented the district since 1981, ran for re-election. He was re-elected with 57.3% of the vote in 2006 and the district had a PVI of R+5.Democrat Webb won the district 50.0%–48.8% in his Senate race. In 2005 Democrat Tim Kaine won the district by 50% to 46% in his gubernatorial race. In 2004 George W. Bush won 55% of this district.

=== Republican primary ===
==== Candidates ====
===== Nominee =====
- Frank Wolf, incumbent U.S. Representative

===== Eliminated in primary =====
- Vern McKinley, financial consultant

==== Endorsements ====
Vern McKinley

Organizations

- Republican Liberty Caucus

==== Results ====
Republican primary results
Party	Candidate	Votes	%
Republican	Frank Wolf (incumbent)	16,726	91.7
Republican	Vern McKinley	1,506	8.3
Total votes		18,232	100.0

=== Democratic primary ===
==== Candidates ====
===== Nominee =====
- Judy Feder, professor at Georgetown University and nominee for this seat 2006

===== Eliminated in primary =====
- Mike Turner, nonprofit worker

==== Results ====
Democratic primary results
Party	Candidate	Votes	%
Democratic	Judy Feder	5,462	61.8
Democratic	Mike Turner	3,377	38.2
Total votes		8,839	100.0

=== Other Candidates ===
- Neeraj C. Nigam, computer systems analyst and candidate for this seat in 2006 (Independent)

=== General election ===
==== Endorsements ====
Judy Feder (D)

Labor unions

- AFL-CIO

Organizations

- Democratic Congressional Campaign Committee "Red to Blue" Program
- EMILYs List

==== Predictions ====
Source	Ranking	As of
The Cook Political Report	Likely R	November 6, 2008
Rothenberg	Safe R	November 2, 2008
Sabato's Crystal Ball	Safe R	November 6, 2008
Real Clear Politics	Safe R	November 7, 2008
CQ Politics	Likely R	November 6, 2008

==== Results ====
Virginia's 10th congressional district election, 2008
Party	Candidate	Votes	%
Republican	Frank Wolf (incumbent)	223,140	58.8
Democratic	Judy Feder	147,357	38.8
Independent	Neeraj Nigam	8,457	2.2
Write-in		526	0.1
Majority		75,783	20.0
Total votes		379,480	100.0
Republican hold			

- Race ranking and details from CQ Politics
- Campaign contributions from OpenSecrets

== District 11 ==
2008 Virginia's 11th congressional district election
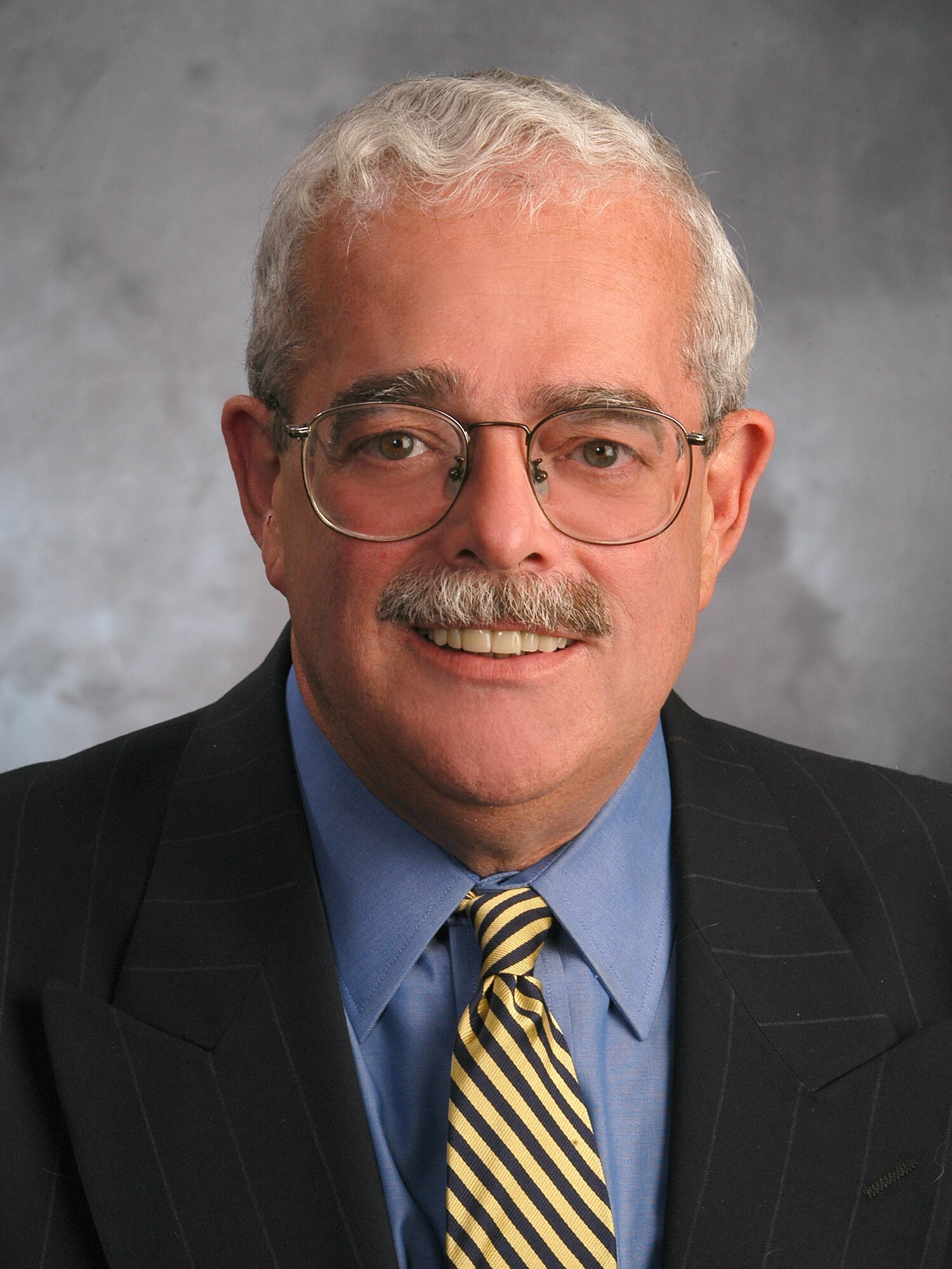
Nominee	Gerry Connolly
Party	Democratic
Popular vote	196,598
Percentage	54.7%
U.S. Representative before election
Tom Davis
Republican
Elected U.S. Representative
Gerry Connolly
Democratic

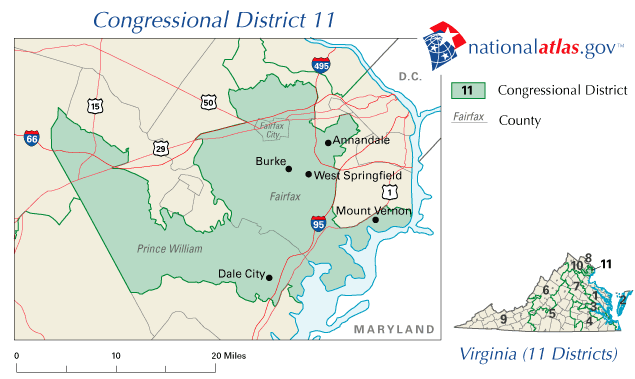

Incumbent Republican Tom Davis, who had represented the Democratic trending district, located in the wealthy Northern Virginia suburbs of Washington, DC which includes part of Fairfax and Prince William counties, since 1995, retired rather than run for re-election. He was re-elected with % of the vote in 2006 and the district had a PVI of R+1. George W. Bush barely won this district with 50% to 49% for John Kerry in 2004. Webb won the district 55%–44% in his Senate race. In 2005 Democrat Tim Kaine won the district by 56% to 42% in his gubernatorial race.

=== Republican primary ===
Fimian had personal wealth to draw upon.

==== Candidates ====
===== Nominee =====
- Keith Fimian, former Certified Public Accountant

===== Declined =====
- Tom Davis, incumbent U.S. Representative
- Tim Hugo, state delegate
- Corey Stewart, Prince William Board of County Supervisors Chair

=== Democratic primary ===
==== Candidates ====
===== Nominee =====
- Gerry Connolly, Chair of the Fairfax County Board of Supervisors

===== Eliminated in primary =====
- Lori Alexander, George Mason University senior
- Leslie Byrne, former U.S. Representative and nominee for Lieutenant Governor in 2005
- Douglas Denneny, retired Navy pilot, and former legislative liaison for the Chairman of the Joint Chiefs of Staff

==== Endorsements ====
Leslie Byrne

Organizations

- EMILY's List

==== Polling ====
Poll source	Date(s) administered	Sample size	Margin of error	Lori Alexander	Leslie Byrne	Gerry Connolly	Douglas Denneny	Undecided
Lake Research Partners (D–Connolly)	March 24–27, 2008	500 (LV)	±4.4%	1%	25%	45%	1%	28%
Global Strategy Group (D–Byrne)	January 9–13, 2008	400 (LV)	±4.9%	–	39%	29%	8%	24%
Lake Research Partners (D–Connolly)	January 7–10, 2008	400 (RV)	±4.9%	–	22%	45%	1%	32%

==== Results ====
Democratic primary results
Party	Candidate	Votes	%
Democratic	Gerry Connolly	14,233	57.9
Democratic	Leslie Byrne	8,196	33.4
Democratic	Doug Denneny	1,508	6.1
Democratic	Lori Alexander	638	2.6
Total votes		24,575	100.0

=== Independent Greens primary ===
Oddo favored light rail as an alternative to HOT lanes.

==== Candidates ====
===== Nominee =====
- Joseph Oddo, freelance writer, nominee for this seat in 2004 and for the 5th district in 2006

=== General election ===
==== Endorsements ====
Keith Fimian (R)

Organizations

- Eagle Forum
Gerry Connolly (D)

Labor unions

- AFL-CIO

Organizations

- Citizens for Global Solutions
- Democratic Congressional Campaign Committee "Red to Blue" Program
- Planned Parenthood Action Fund

==== Polling ====
Poll source	Date(s) administered	Sample size	Margin of error	Keith Fimian (R)	Gerry Connolly (D)	Joseph Oddo (IG)	Undecided
McLaughlin & Associates (R–Fimian)	July 15–16, 2008	300 (LV)	±5.7%	25%	29%	–	47%
Lake Research Partners (D–Connolly)	July 10–14, 2008	500 (LV)	±4.4%	21%	52%	2%	25%

==== Predictions ====
Source	Ranking	As of
The Cook Political Report	Likely D (flip)	November 6, 2008
Rothenberg	Likely D (flip)	November 2, 2008
Sabato's Crystal Ball	Lean D (flip)	November 6, 2008
Real Clear Politics	Lean D (flip)	November 7, 2008
CQ Politics	Likely D (flip)	November 6, 2008

==== Results ====
Virginia's 11th congressional district election, 2008
Party	Candidate	Votes	%
Democratic	Gerry Connolly	196,598	54.7
Republican	Keith Fimian	154,758	43.0
Independent Greens	Joseph Oddo	7,271	2.0
Write-in		864	0.2
Majority		41,840	11.6
Total votes		359,491	100.0
Democratic gain from Republican			

- Race ranking and details from CQ Politics
- Campaign contributions from OpenSecrets
- Fimian (R) vs Connolly (D) graph of poll results at Pollster.com
