= Jay Leftwich =

American politician (born 1962)

Member of the Virginia House of Delegates
- Incumbent
- Assumed office January 8, 2014
- Preceded by: John Cosgrove
- Constituency: 78th district (2014–2024); 90th district (2024–present)

Personal details
- Party: Republican

James Asbury Leftwich Jr. (born December 11, 1962) is an American politician from Virginia. A member of the Republican Party, Leftwich is a member of the Virginia House of Delegates for the 90th district. Leftwich was a member of the Chesapeake School Board.

Leftwich is a member of the Counties, Cities and Towns Committees, Courts of Justice Committee, and General Laws Committee. He was promoted to the chair of the General Laws Committee in 2022.
