= Betsy B. Carr =

American politician (born 1946)

Member of the Virginia House of Delegates
- Incumbent
- Assumed office January 3, 2010
- Preceded by: Frank Hall
- Constituency: 69th district (2010–2024); 78th district (2024–present)

Personal details
- Born: Betsy Gordon Brooks; July 27, 1946 (age 80) Norfolk, Virginia, U.S.
- Party: Democratic
- Education: Hollins College (BA)
- Profession: Educator
- Committees: General Laws; Transportation; Appropriations; Rules

Betsy Brooks Carr (born July 27, 1946) is a member of the Virginia House of Delegates, representing the 78th district, which includes part of Richmond and Chesterfield County. She served on the School Board in Richmond, Virginia, from 2006 to 2009 before being elected to the Virginia House of Delegates in the 2009 general election.

== Career ==
Betsy Carr was born on July 27, 1946, in Norfolk, Virginia. She served on the School Board in Richmond, Virginia, from 2006 to 2009. In addition, she is the founder, and in the past was the director of, the Micah Initiative, a program which is in partnership with 105 religious communities and 25 elementary schools that provides volunteers and tutors for children.

She was elected to the Virginia House of Delegates in 2009 representing parts of the City of Richmond and the County of Chesterfield on both sides of the James River. In the House of Delegates she serves on the Appropriations, Transportation, General Laws, and Rules Committees. She also serves on the Joint Legislative Audit and Review Commission, the Commission on Employee Retirement Security and Pension Reform, the Joint Commission on Administrative Rules, the Martin Luther King Jr. Memorial Commission, and the Virginia Housing Commission. She is Treasurer of the House Democratic Caucus.

In addition to serving as a delegate, she also served for 16 years as outreach director at St. Paul's Episcopal Church in downtown Richmond. She is a founder and past director of the Micah Initiative, which involves over 120 faith communities in partnerships with 25 city elementary schools, providing over 1,700 mentors, tutors and volunteers. This program is serving as a model for other similar partnerships in the country.

She represented the fifth district of the City of Richmond on the Richmond School Board from 2006 to 2010. On the School Board, she chaired the Facilities Committee, served on the Audit and Finance Committees and represented the Board on the Community Partnerships Committee.

Previously, she worked as supervisor of statewide programs at the Virginia Museum of Fine Arts, community relations and resource development chairperson at the University of Richmond's Women's Resource Center, and as a Development Associate at the Virginia Historical Society. While active in the Junior League she chaired the training committee.

She is a graduate of Hope in the Cities' Connecting Communities Fellowship Program and studied at the University of Richmond's Management Training Institute. In 2005, she was selected to receive one of the YWCA's Outstanding Women Awards. In 2008 she served on the Virginia State Capitol Civil Rights Memorial Celebration Committee. An exhibition of her photographs, taken during a World Neighbors trip to Mali, Africa, hangs in the Wilder Museum at Virginia Union University.

She is an honors graduate of Hollins College (now Hollins University). She is the first Hollins graduate to be elected to serve in the Virginia General Assembly. She has three grown sons and four grandchildren.

== Electoral history ==
General election for Virginia House of Delegates, 2009
Party	Candidate	Votes	%
Democratic	Betsy B. Carr	9,652	72.7
Republican	Ernesto Sampson	2,874	21.6
Independent	L. Shirley Harvey	733	5.52

She defeated Republican Ernesto Sampson and Independent Shirley Harvey in 2009 to replace Democratic delegate Franklin P. Hall, who had retired to be appointed to the Virginia Alcoholic Beverage Control Board by Gov. Tim Kaine, leaving the seat vacant.

She won reelection to the Virginia House of Delegates in 2011, 2013, 2015, 2017, 2019, 2021, 2023, and 2025.

== See also ==
- 2009 Virginia elections
- Richmond, Virginia
