= Harry Blevins =

American politician (1935–2018)

Harry B. Blevins

Member of the Virginia Senate from the 14th district
- In office September 10, 2001 – August 5, 2013
- Preceded by: Randy Forbes
- Succeeded by: John Cosgrove

Member of the Virginia House of Delegates from the 78th district
- In office January 16, 1998 – September 10, 2001
- Preceded by: Randy Forbes
- Succeeded by: John Cosgrove

Personal details
- Born: August 22, 1935 Elk Park, North Carolina
- Died: February 19, 2018 (aged 82)
- Party: Republican
- Education: East Carolina University; University of Virginia
- Profession: Teacher

Harry B. Blevins (August 22, 1935 – February 19, 2018) was an American politician. He served in the Virginia House of Delegates January 16, 1998 – September 10, 2001, and the Senate of Virginia September 10, 2001 – August 5, 2013, succeeding Randy Forbes in both offices. Blevins was a member of the Republican Party. Blevins died on February 19, 2018.
