= Virginia's 78th House of Delegates district =

Virginia legislative district

District map from the 2023 election

Virginia's 78th House of Delegates district elects one of 100 seats in the Virginia House of Delegates, the lower house of the state's bicameral legislature. District 78 currently represents part of the city of Richmond. Until redistricting took effect in 2024, District 78 represented part of the city of Chesapeake in Hampton Roads, the southern coastal region of Virginia. The seat is currently held by Democrat Betsy Carr.

== Electoral history ==
=== 2013 ===
On November 6, 2013, three candidates vied for the open seat in the 78th district, vacated in August of that year when incumbent John Cosgrove won a special election to the state senate. In the House of Delegates race, Republican Jay Leftwich, a lawyer and chair of the local school board, prevailed with 57% of the vote; the Democrat Linda Bryant earned 39% and Libertarian Dan Foster trailed both.

== District officeholders ==
| Years | Delegate | Party | Electoral history |
|---|---|---|---|
| January 12, 1983 – January 10, 1990 | Frederick H. Creekmore | Democratic | |
| January 10, 1990 – January 5, 1998 | Randy Forbes | Republican | Declined to seek reelection; Elected to the Senate of Virginia |
| January 16, 1998 – September 10, 2001 | Harry Blevins | Republican | Resigned; Elected to the Senate of Virginia |
| January 9, 2002 – August 16, 2013 | John Cosgrove | Republican | Resigned; Elected to the Senate of Virginia |
| January 2014 – present | Jay Leftwich | Republican | First elected in 2013; Redistricted to the 90th District |
| January 2010 – present | Betsy Carr | Democratic | Member since 2010; Redistricted from the 69th District (2010–2024) |
