= Norman Sisisky =

American politician (1927–2001)

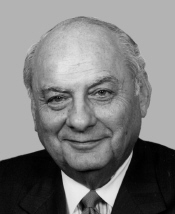

Member of the U.S. House of Representatives from Virginia's 4th district
- In office January 3, 1983 – March 29, 2001
- Preceded by: Robert Daniel
- Succeeded by: Randy Forbes

Member of the Virginia House of Delegates
- In office January 9, 1974 – January 3, 1983
- Preceded by: W. Roy Smith
- Succeeded by: Jay DeBoer
- Constituency: 30th district (1974‍–‍1982); 27th district (1982‍–‍1983)

Personal details
- Born: June 9, 1927 Baltimore, Maryland, U.S.
- Died: March 29, 2001 (aged 73) Petersburg, Virginia, U.S.
- Party: Democratic
- Spouse: Rhoda
- Children: 4
- Education: Richmond Professional Institute (BS)
- Occupation: Businessman; politician

Military service
- Branch/service: United States Navy
- Years of service: 1945‍–‍1946

Norman Sisisky (June 9, 1927 – March 29, 2001) was an American businessman and politician who was a Democratic member of the United States House of Representatives from Virginia from 1983 until his death in 2001, representing the 4th district. He was a leader of the Blue Dog Coalition and one of the most conservative Democrats in Congress at the time.

== Biography ==
Sisisky was born in Baltimore, Maryland but grew up in Richmond, Virginia. He was Jewish. Upon graduating from high school, he served a two-year tour of duty in the U.S. Navy. In 1946, he entered the Richmond Professional Institute (which would later merge with the Medical College of Virginia to form Virginia Commonwealth University), earning a business degree in 1949. Sisisky became a successful businessman, founding an independent bottling company in Petersburg that later became a part of Pepsi's Virginia operations.

=== Virginia state legislature ===
In 1973, Sisisky was elected to the Virginia House of Delegates, serving for five terms.

=== Congress ===
In 1982, Sisisky was elected to Congress, defeating five-term incumbent Republican Robert Daniel and serving from 1983 to 2001. A fiscal disciplinarian, he aligned himself with the Democratic Party's Blue Dog coalition. He was a leading member of the Intelligence Committee and worked closely with the CIA.

=== Personal life and death ===
Sisisky and his wife, Rhoda, had four sons. He died from lung cancer at his home in Petersburg, Virginia, on March 29, 2001, at the age of 73. A special election was held June 19, 2001 to fill his seat, and Republican State Senator Randy Forbes defeated Democratic State Senator Louise Lucas for the remainder of Sisisky's term.

== Electoral history ==
- 1982; Sisisky was elected to the U.S. House of Representatives with 54.38% of the vote, defeating Republican Robert Daniel.
- 1984; Sisisky was re-elected unopposed.
- 1986; Sisisky was re-elected unopposed.
- 1988; Sisisky was re-elected unopposed.
- 1990; Sisisky was re-elected with 78.55% of the vote, defeating Independents Don L. Reynolds and Loretta F. Chandler.
- 1992; Sisisky was re-elected with 68.37% of the vote, defeating Republican Anthony J. Zevgolis.
- 1994; Sisisky was re-elected with 61.61% of the vote, defeating Republican A. George Sweet, III.
- 1996; Sisisky was re-elected with 78.61% of the vote, defeating Republican Zevgolis.
- 1998; Sisisky was re-elected unopposed.
- 2000; Sisisky was re-elected unopposed.

== See also ==
- List of Jewish members of the United States Congress
- List of members of the United States Congress who died in office (2000–present)#2000s

U.S. House of Representatives
Preceded by Robert Daniel	Member of the U.S. House of Representatives from Virginia's 4th congressional district 1983–2001	Succeeded by Randy Forbes
