= Robert Daniel =

American politician (1936–2012)

Robert W. Daniel
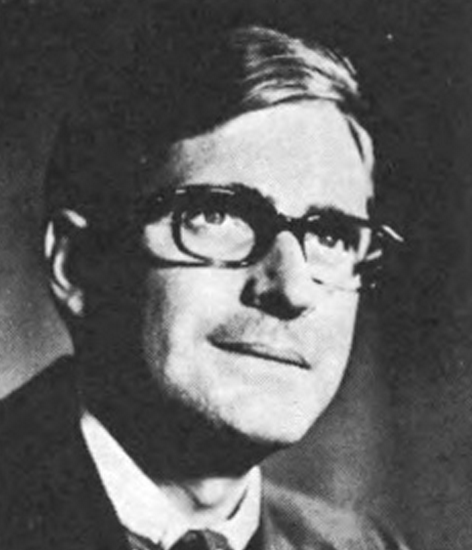

Member of the U.S. House of Representatives from Virginia's 4th district
- In office January 3, 1973 – January 3, 1983
- Preceded by: Watkins Abbitt
- Succeeded by: Norman Sisisky

Personal details
- Born: March 17, 1936 Richmond, Virginia, U.S.
- Died: February 4, 2012 (aged 75) Jupiter Island, Florida, U.S.
- Resting place: Hollywood Cemetery, Richmond, Virginia
- Party: Republican (1960–2012); Democratic (before 1960)
- Spouse(s): Sally L. Chase (div.); Linda Hearne
- Children: Robert W. Daniel, III; Charlotte Bemiss Daniel; Nell Daniel
- Relatives: FitzGerald Bemiss (cousin)
- Education: University of Virginia (B.A.); Columbia University (M.B.A.)
- Profession: gentleman farmer, adjunct professor, politician
- Awards: National Intelligence Distinguished Service Medal

Military service
- Branch/service: United States Army Reserve; Central Intelligence Agency
- Years of service: 1959; 1964–1968

Robert Williams Daniel, Jr. (March 17, 1936 – February 4, 2012) was an American farmer, businessman, teacher, and politician from Virginia who served five terms in the U.S. House of Representatives as a Republican. He was first elected in 1972 and served until 1983.

== Biography ==
=== Early life ===
Daniel was born in Richmond, Virginia. He was the son of Robert Williams Daniel, a bank executive who survived the sinking of the RMS Titanic in 1912, and later served in the Senate of Virginia, and his third wife Charlotte Randolph Christian (née Bemiss). His father died when he was four years old.

He was a descendant of Peter V. Daniel, an Associate Justice of the United States Supreme Court, and Edmund Randolph, who was the seventh Governor of Virginia, the first Attorney General of the United States, and the second Secretary of State.

He graduated from the Fay School in Southborough, Massachusetts, and Woodberry Forest School, in Woodberry Forest, Virginia. He earned a Bachelor of Arts from the University of Virginia in Charlottesville, Virginia, where he was a member of Phi Kappa Psi. He then received a Masters in Business Administration from Columbia University.

=== Career ===
Daniel worked for a time as a financial analyst, later teaching Economics at the University of Richmond. He served in the United States Army and Central Intelligence Agency from 1964 to 1968, when he returned home to take over the management of Brandon Plantation after the death of his mother.

Daniel had grown up as a Conservative Democrat like his father, but became a Republican sometime in the 1960s, a time when many Southern Democrats, dissatisfied with the policies of desegregation, left the Democratic Party. In 1972, Daniel, who was then serving on the Prince George County Planning Commission, ran for the open seat in Virginia's 4th congressional district after a redistricting controversy and the retirement of longtime incumbent Watkins Abbitt. He won in the five-candidate general election, becoming the first Republican to represent this district since the end of the Reconstruction Era.

While in Congress, Daniel was a member of the House Armed Services Committee and various subcommittees. He was defeated in his bid for a sixth term by Norman Sisisky in 1982. He served as deputy assistant Secretary of Defense from 1984 to 1986, and director of intelligence for the Department of Energy from 1990 to 1993. He was a recipient of the National Intelligence Distinguished Service Medal.

=== Personal life ===
He was the owner and operator of Brandon Plantation, in Prince George, Virginia, a U.S. National Historic Landmark and one of the oldest continuous agricultural operations in the United States.

Daniel was married twice. He had three children with his first wife, Sally (born Sally Lewis Chase). He was a member of The Commonwealth Club in Richmond and the Knickerbocker Club in New York City.

Daniel died of a heart attack at his Jupiter Island, Florida, vacation home on February 4, 2012, and was buried with military honors at Hollywood Cemetery in Richmond. He was survived by his second wife, Linda, and his two daughters. His son, Robert Williams Daniel, III, predeceased him.

== Electoral history ==
- 1972; Daniel was elected to the U.S. House of Representatives with 55.67% of the vote, defeating Democrat Robert E. Gibson and Independents Robert R. Hardy, William E. Ward, and John G. Vonetes.
- 1974; Daniel was re-elected with 47.21% of the vote, defeating Democrat Lester E. Schlitz and Independent Curtis W. Harris.
- 1976; Daniel was re-elected with 53.03% of the vote, defeating Democrat Joseph William O'Brien, Jr.
- 1978; Daniel was re-elected unopposed.
- 1980; Daniel was re-elected with 60.7% of the vote, defeating Democrat Cecil Y. Jenkins.
- 1982; Daniel lost his re-election bid to Democrat Norman Sisisky.

U.S. House of Representatives
Preceded by Watkins M. Abbitt	Member of the U.S. House of Representatives from Virginia's 4th congressional district 1973–1983	Succeeded by Norman Sisisky
