= Randy Forbes =

American politician (born 1952)

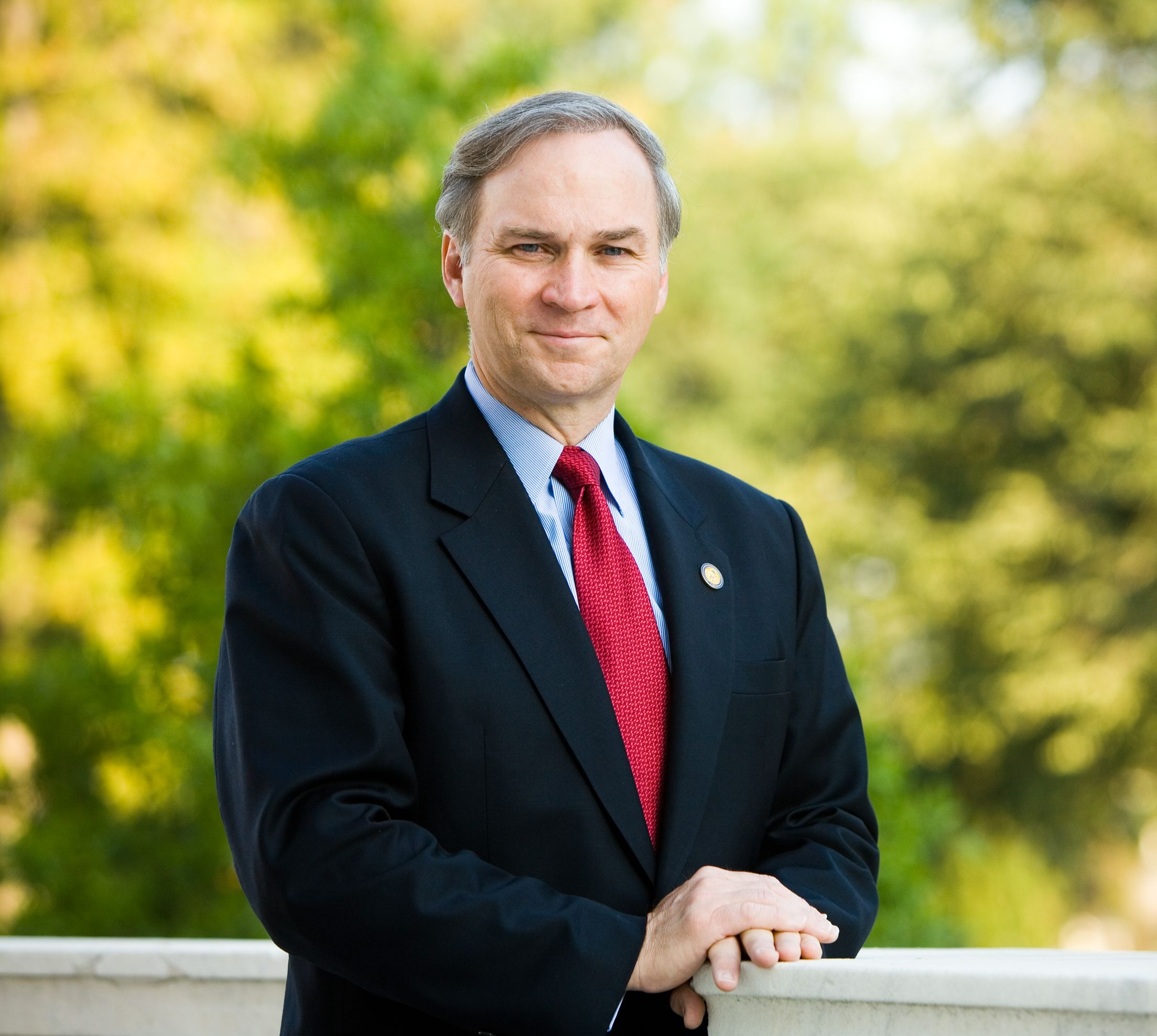

Member of the U.S. House of Representatives from Virginia's 4th district
- In office June 19, 2001 – January 3, 2017 (Note: Forbes's official service begins on the date of the special election, while he was not sworn in until June 26, 2001.)
- Preceded by: Norman Sisisky
- Succeeded by: Donald McEachin

Member of the Virginia Senate from the 14th district
- In office January 6, 1998 – June 19, 2001
- Preceded by: Mark Earley
- Succeeded by: Harry Blevins

Member of the Virginia House of Delegates from the 78th district
- In office January 10, 1990 – January 5, 1998
- Preceded by: Frederick Creekmore
- Succeeded by: Harry Blevins

Chair of the Virginia Republican Party
- In office June 1996 – December 2000
- Preceded by: Patrick McSweeney
- Succeeded by: Gary Thomson

Personal details
- Born: James Randy Forbes; February 17, 1952 (age 74) Chesapeake, Virginia, U.S.
- Party: Republican
- Spouse: Shirley Forbes
- Children: 4
- Education: Randolph-Macon College (BA); University of Virginia (JD)

James Randy Forbes (born February 17, 1952) is an American politician. A member of the Republican Party, he was the U.S. representative for Virginia's 4th congressional district, serving from 2001 to 2017.

Prior to joining the United States Congress, he was a member of the Virginia House of Delegates, Virginia State Senate, and Chairman of the Republican Party of Virginia. Forbes formerly served as Chairman of the Seapower and Projection Forces Subcommittee of the House Armed Services Committee.

During the Donald Trump administration, Forbes was reviewed as a prospective choice for Secretary of the Navy. Forbes campaigned for Trump in the 2016 presidential election. Forbes was passed over twice for the first-round and second round nominations of Secretary of the Navy.

Forbes served as a senior distinguished fellow at the U.S. Naval War College from February through December 2017.

Forbes founded Project Blitz, a radical Christian organization focused on providing state legislators with model legislation to "inject religion into public education, attack reproductive healthcare, and undermine LGBTQ equality using a distorted definition of “religious freedom”," according to watchdog Blitzwatch.

== Early life, education and career ==
Forbes was born in Chesapeake, Virginia, the son of Thelma and Malcolm J. Forbes. Forbes attended Great Bridge High School, graduating in 1970. Forbes graduated first in his class from Randolph-Macon College in 1974.

He received his Juris Doctor from the University of Virginia School of Law in 1977. Forbes worked in private practice for Kaufman & Canoles PC.

== Political career ==
Forbes served in the Virginia House of Delegates from 1989 to 1997 and the Virginia State Senate from 1997 to 2001. He also served as chairman of the Republican Party of Virginia from 1996 to 2001.

He was first elected to the House in 2001 to fill a vacancy caused by the death of ten-term Democratic Congressman Norman Sisisky; defeating Democratic State Senator Louise Lucas 52–48%. After the 4th district was reconfigured as part of redistricting, he ran unopposed by Democrats in 2002 and 2006. In 2004, he faced Jonathan R. Menefee, and won with 65% of the vote. He faced Wynne LeGrow in the 2010 election, and was easily re-elected with 62% of the vote. In 2012, he defeated Chesapeake City Councilwoman Ella Ward with 57% of the vote.

Forbes was the founder and chairman of the Congressional Prayer Caucus and the Congressional China Caucus. He championed a plan to rebuild the Navy to 350 ships as chairman of the House Seapower Subcommittee.

On February 8, 2016, he announced that he would run for election to Virginia's 2nd Congressional District in November 2016 after a court-ordered redistricting saw the 4th absorb most of the majority-black areas around Richmond. The new map turned the 4th from a Republican-leaning swing district into a strongly Democratic district. He did so while at the same time announcing that he would continue to live in Chesapeake, which remained in the 4th; members of the House are only constitutionally required to live in the state they represent. Forbes stated that his seniority gave him a chance to become the first Virginian to chair the House Armed Services Committee. The 2nd District was being vacated by fellow Republican Scott Rigell.

Forbes accused state Delegate and former U.S. Navy SEAL, Scott Taylor, of criminal activity for speeding violations and missing a court appearance, including a scheduled hearing when Taylor was deployed with the Navy. On June 14, 2016, Forbes was defeated in the Republican primary by Scott Taylor by a margin of 52.5% to 40.6%, with a third candidate, C. Pat Cardwell IV, receiving 6.8% of the vote. Taylor went on to win the general election on November 8, 2016.

Forbes received $801,606 in campaign financing from donors in the defense industry during his tenure in Congress. The largest donors to Forbes over his Congressional career have been defense contractors serving the U.S. Navy for aviation and ship construction, including Northrop Grumman, BAE Systems, Leidos and Huntington Ingalls.

After leaving Congress in 2017, Forbes joined the Government Law & Policy Practice’s Federal team at Greenberg Traurig as a senior director.

== U.S. House of Representatives ==
=== Committee assignments ===
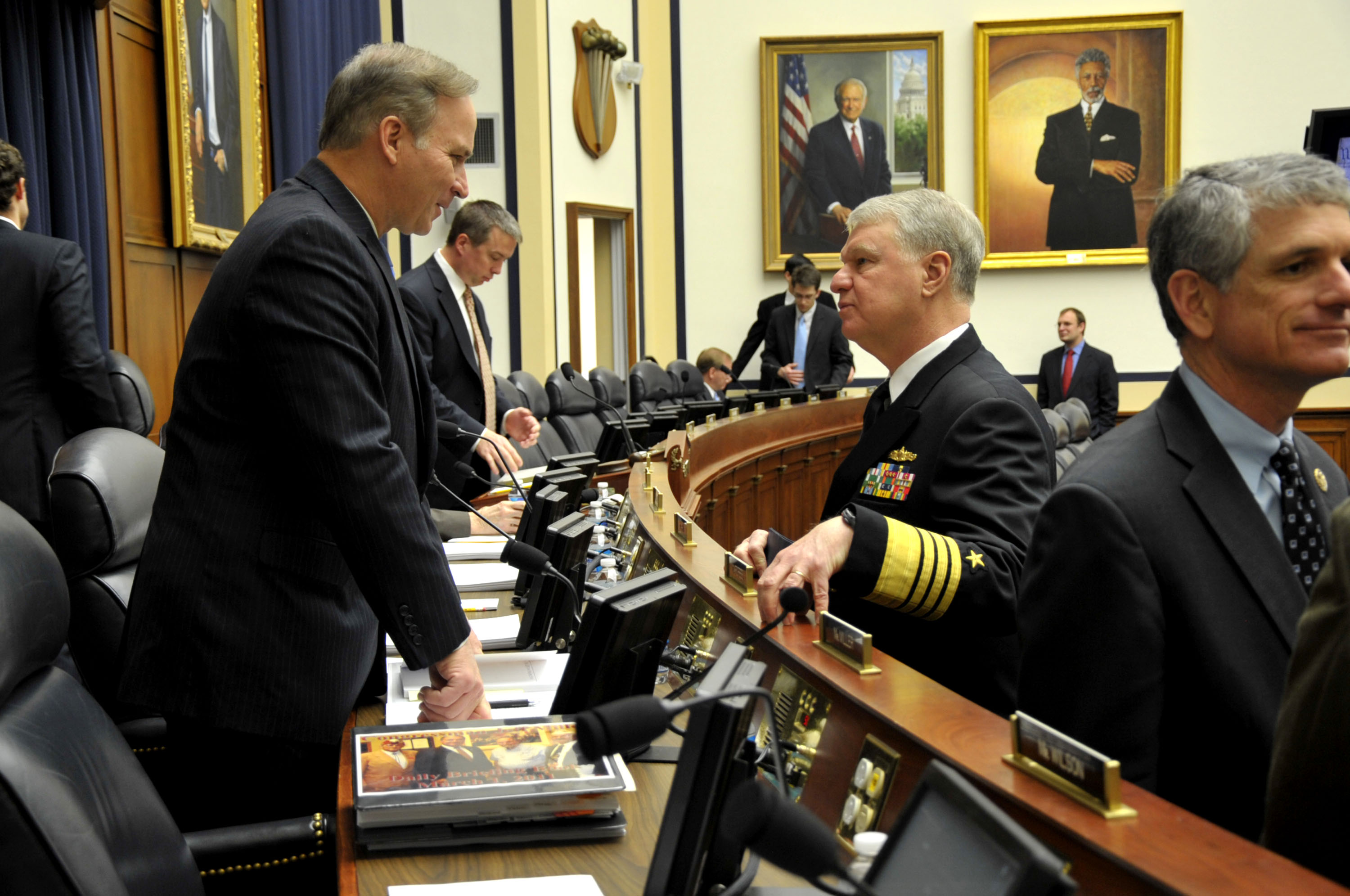
Rep. Forbes speaks with Chief of Naval Operations Adm. Gary Roughead before testifying in 2011

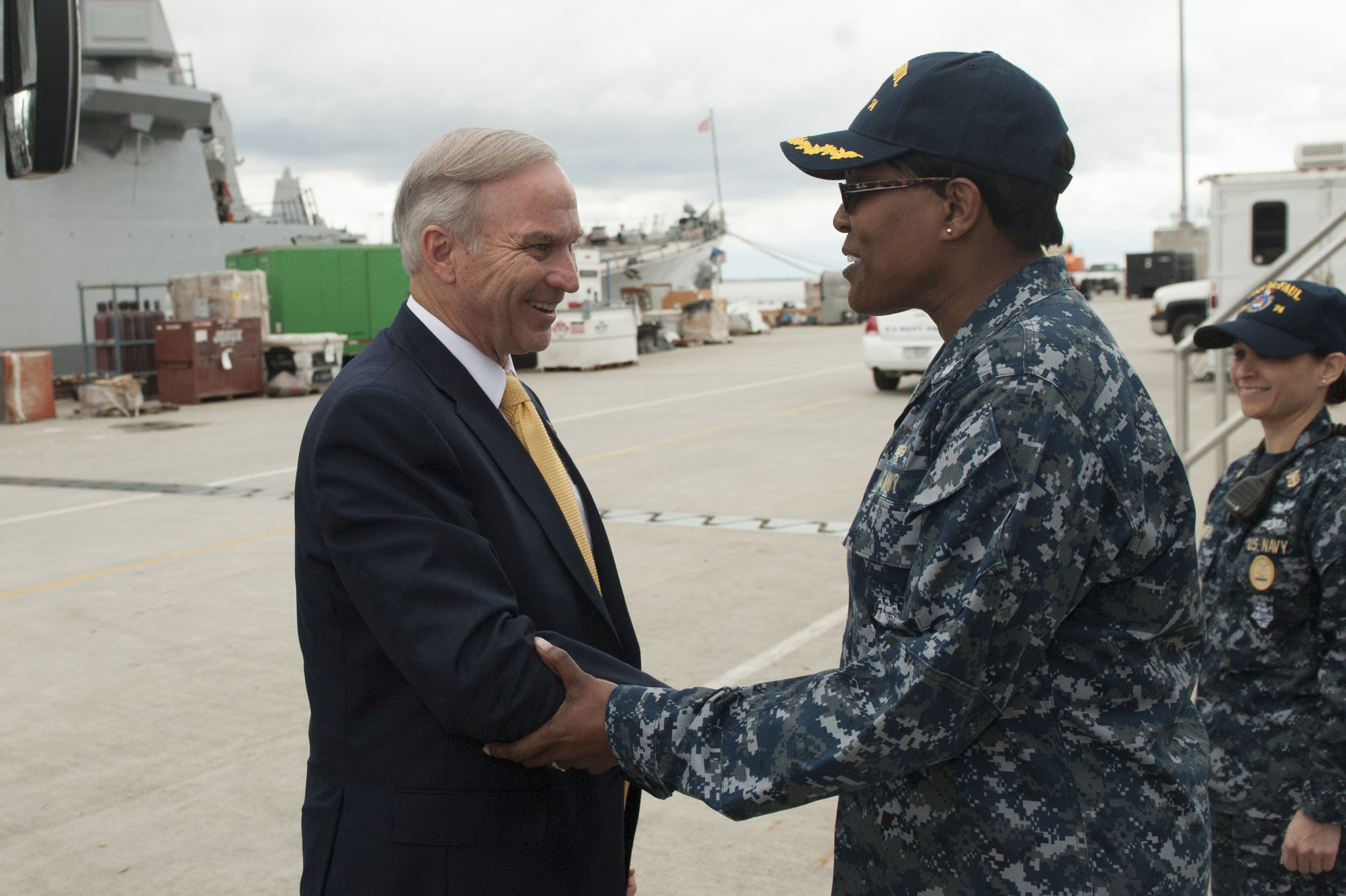
Navy commander greets House Armed Services' Seapower and Projection Forces Subcommittee Chairman Forbes in 2016

- Committee on Armed Services
  - Subcommittee on Seapower and Projection Forces (Chair)
  - Subcommittee on Readiness (former Chair)
- Committee on Education and the Workforce
- Committee on the Judiciary
  - Subcommittee on the Constitution
  - Subcommittee on Crime, Terrorism, and Homeland Security

=== Memberships ===
Forbes founded the Congressional Prayer Caucus in 2005 and co-chaired the caucus with Senator James Lankford.

== Political positions ==
=== Defense ===
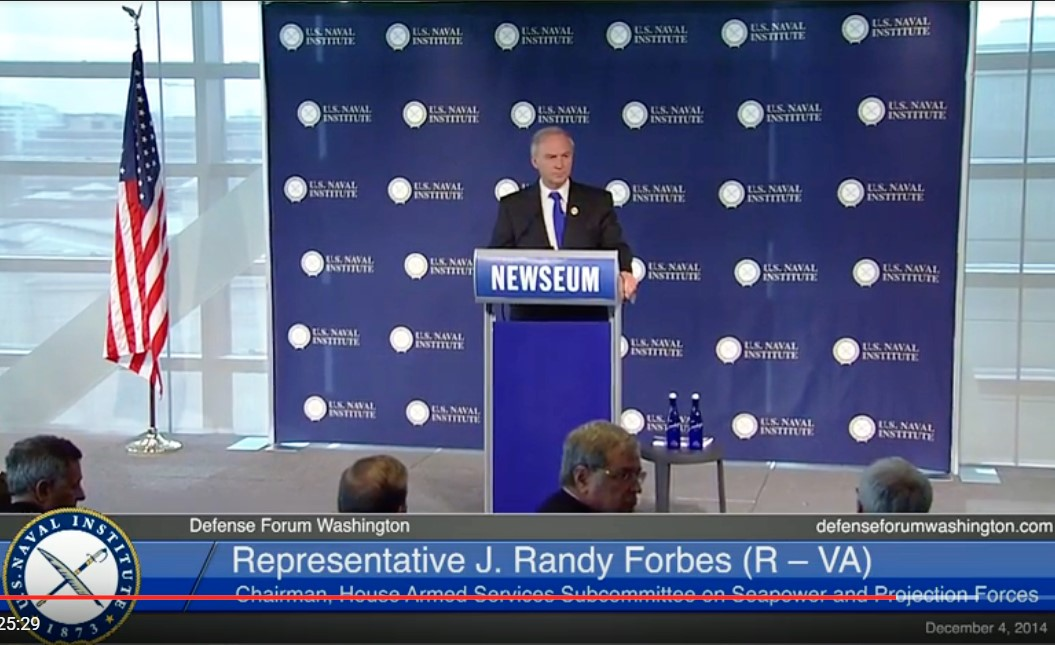
Forbes speaks at the U.S. Naval Institute in 2014

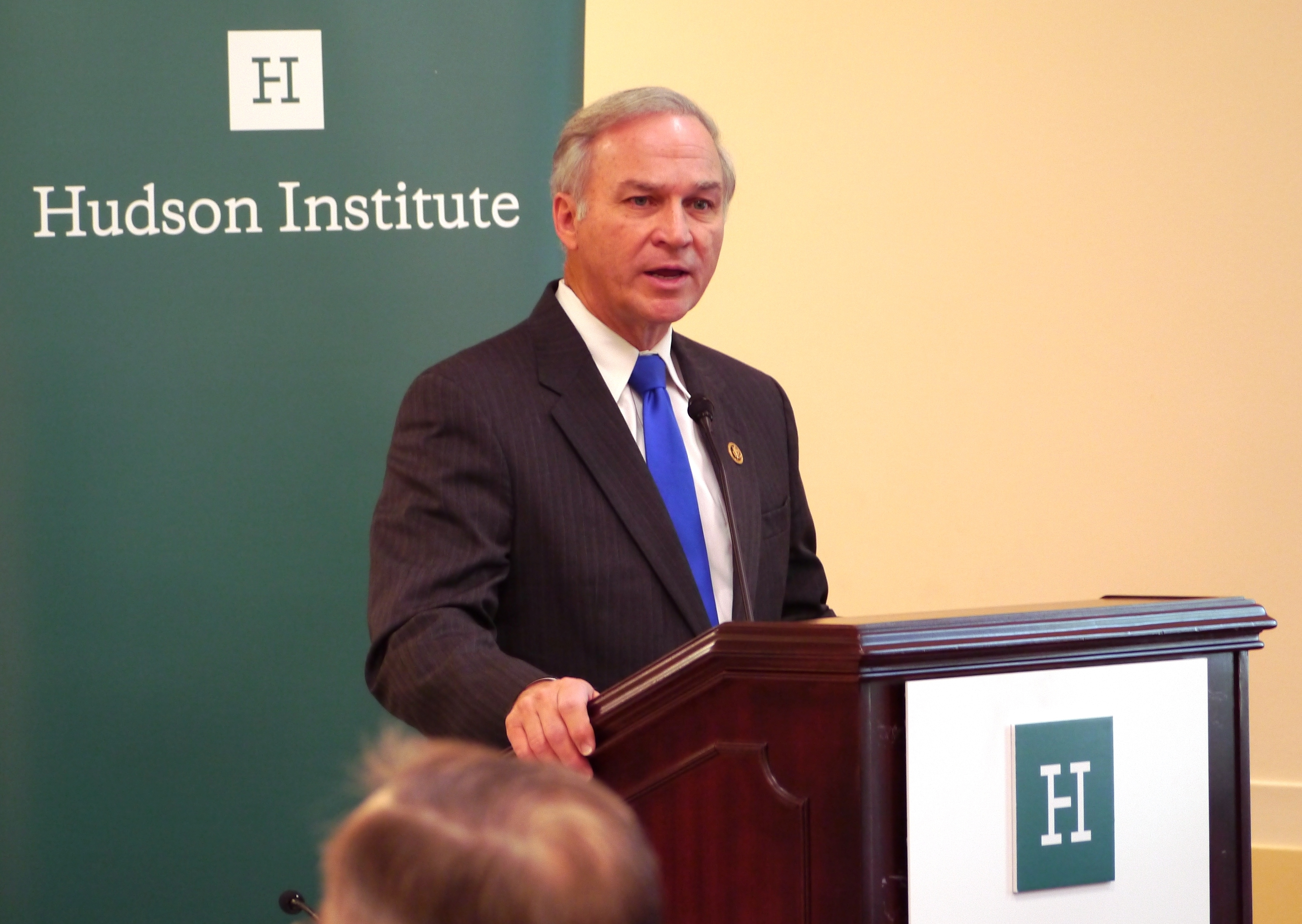
Forbes speaks at Hudson Institute's Center for American Seapower in 2015

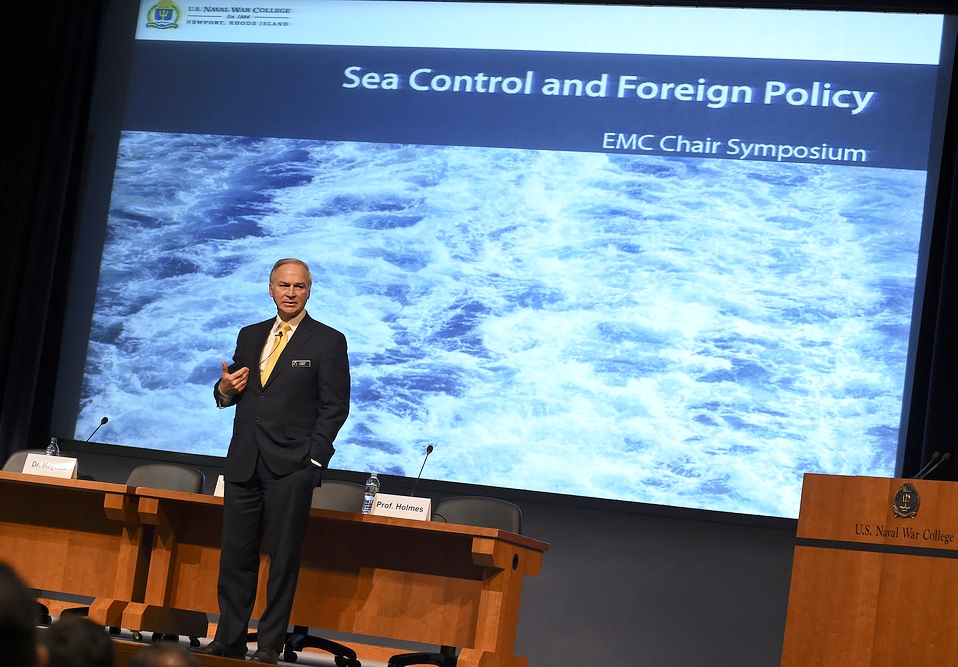
Senior distinguished fellow of U.S. Naval War College Randy Forbes gives keynote address "Sea Control and Foreign Policy"

Forbes was formerly Chairman of the House Armed Services Committee's Seapower and Projection Forces subcommittee.

In 2013, Forbes publicly opposed military action in both Libya and Syria. In 2014, he promised to promote President Obama's call for funds for action in Syria.

In 2014, Forbes voted to address cuts imposed by sequestration with a $1.4 billion cut to operations, maintenance, and training funds, rather than mothballing 11 cruisers and three amphibious warships.

=== China ===
Forbes was founder and chairman of the Congressional China Caucus. Forbes spoke a panel discussion at Harvard University in the April 2012 on U.S. strategy to China's world power emergence. Forbes has voiced concern for Chinese military ambition, cyber threats, contaminated exports, and human rights violations. His reputation came under scrutiny with the acquisition in 2013 of America's largest pork company, Smithfield Foods, by a Chinese competitor – a company headquartered within his district. This $4.7 billion deal is the biggest Chinese acquisition of a U.S. company to date.

=== Energy ===
On June 12, 2008, Forbes introduced H.R. 6260, titled "New Manhattan Project for Energy Independence". The bill was offered as a substitute for the entire energy bill and outlined a series of prizes, similar to the X-PRIZE, which would be awarded to a private entity, which completed one of seven tasks related to achieving energy independence.

The bill included $14 billion in prizes and $10 billion in grants ($10 billion of which would have supported nuclear fusion research); provisions to establish a summit to discuss the challenge of energy independence; and creation of a commission to offer recommendations to fulfill the goal of becoming energy independent within 20 years. On June 26, 2009, the bill was offered as an amendment in the nature of a substitute for the Waxman/Markey-sponsored American Clean Energy and Security Act. The amendment was rejected by the House of Representatives 255–172.

=== LGBT rights ===
In 2015, Forbes cosponsored a resolution to amend the US constitution to ban same-sex marriage.

== Electoral history ==
Virginia's 4th congressional district: Results 2000–2014 Virginia's 2nd congressional district: Republican Primary Results, 2016
Year	Democratic	Votes	Pct	Republican	Votes	Pct	3rd Party	Party	Votes	Pct
2000	Norman Sisisky **	189,787	99%	(no candidate)			Write-ins		2,108	1%
2001	Louise Lucas	65,190	48%	J. Randy Forbes	70,917	52%				
2002	(no candidate)			J. Randy Forbes	108,733	98%	Write-ins		2,308	2%
2004	Jonathan R. Menefee	100,413	35%	J. Randy Forbes	182,444	64%				
2006	(no candidate)			J. Randy Forbes	150,967	76%	Albert P. Burckard, Jr.	Independent Green	46,487	23%
2008	Andrea Miller	135,041	40%	J. Randy Forbes	199,075	60%				
2010	Wynne LeGrow	74,298	38%	J. Randy Forbes	122,659	62%				
2012	Ella Ward	150,190	43%	J. Randy Forbes	199,292	57%				
2014	Elliot Fausz	75,270	38%	J. Randy Forbes	120,684	60%	Bo Brown	Libertarian	4,427	2%
2016	Scott Taylor	21,406	53%	J. Randy Forbes	16,552	41%	Pat Cardwell	Republican	2,773	7%

*Write-in and minor candidate notes: In 2004, write-ins received 170 votes. In 2006, write-ins received 886 votes. In 2008, write-ins received 405 votes. In 2010, write-ins received 432 votes. In 2014, write-ins received 257 votes.

** Sisisky died on March 29, 2001; Forbes won the 2001 special election to fill out the remainder of his term.

U.S. House of Representatives
Preceded by Norman Sisisky	Member of the U.S. House of Representatives from Virginia's 4th congressional district 2001–2017	Succeeded by Donald McEachin
U.S. order of precedence (ceremonial)
Preceded by Connie Morella as Former U.S. Representative	Order of precedence of the United States as Former U.S. Representative	Succeeded by John M. McHugh as Former U.S. Representative
