= Vern McKinley =

American politician

Vernon P. "Vern" McKinley, born in East Chicago, Indiana advises governments on financial sector policy and legal issues. He is the co-author with the Wall Street Journal's James Freeman of Borrowed Time: Two Centuries of Booms, Busts and Bailouts at Citi published by HarperCollins in 2018. He is also the author of Financing Failure: A Century of Bailouts, published by the Independent Institute in 2012. He was a primary election challenger to 28-year incumbent Congressman Frank Wolf in northern Virginia's 10th congressional district in the 2008 elections, the only one to ever challenge Wolf in a primary during his long tenure. McKinley lives with his family in Ashburn, Virginia and they have also lived in Kyiv and Yerevan.

== Early life ==
McKinley was born in East Chicago, Indiana and grew up in East Side, Chicago. He attended George Washington High School and Downers Grove South High School. He went on to graduate from the University of Illinois Urbana-Champaign in 1985 with degrees in Economics and Finance, graduating with honors. In 1984, Mr. McKinley worked on the re-election campaign of President Ronald Reagan and the U.S. Senate campaign of Representative Tom Corcoran in his unsuccessful bid to unseat Senator Charles H. Percy of Illinois. That year he also worked at the U.S. Senate Republican Policy Committee, which was chaired by Senator John G. Tower of Texas.

== Professional career ==
From 1985 to 1999 Mr. McKinley worked with the Board of Governors of the Federal Reserve, the Federal Deposit Insurance Corporation, the Resolution Trust Corporation and the Department of the Treasury's Office of Thrift Supervision. In 1995, McKinley graduated with honors from the evening program of George Washington University Law School.

Since 1999 he has applied his expertise as a legal advisor and regulatory policy expert to work as an advisor to governments on financial sector issues in the U.S., China, Nigeria, Indonesia, Ukraine, Kazakhstan, Vietnam, Latvia, the Philippines, Kuwait, West Bank, Yugoslavia (now Montenegro), Kenya, the Bahamas, the Eastern Caribbean Currency Union, Trinidad and Tobago, Jamaica, Barbados, Grenada, Belize, Guyana, Turks and Caicos Islands, Dominica, St. Vincent and the Grenadines, St. Lucia, Mozambique, Belarus, Moldova, Morocco, South Sudan, Libya, Afghanistan, Zimbabwe, Zambia, Armenia, Kosovo, Tajikistan, Nepal and Myanmar.

McKinley is the co-author with James Freeman of Borrowed Time: Two Centuries of Booms, Busts and Bailouts at Citi which traces the instability at the bank over Citi's 200-year history. He is also the author of Financing Failure: A Century of Bailouts. The book focuses on the response of the financial agencies to the crises during the 1930s, 1980s and 2000s, with particular emphasis on the most recent crisis. McKinley, a visiting scholar at the George Washington University Law School, has also completed policy work for the American Enterprise Institute and the Cato Institute and has served as an Alumni Council member of The Fund for American Studies.

He has applied his skeptical approach of the need for the bailouts to the narrative of the lingering status of Fannie Mae and Freddie Mac, financial institution runs, the tenure of departed FDIC Chairman Sheila Bair, the pending legacies of Federal Reserve Chairman Bernanke and Treasury Secretary Geithner and Dodd-Frank reforms. He has also reviewed books on financial markets and historical reviews of financial crises.

McKinley also wrote an earlier policy analysis on the bailouts with Gary Gegenheimer for Cato Institute. As a follow-up to that article he brought four Freedom of Information Act (United States) suits against the Federal Deposit Insurance Corporation, the Board of Governors of the Federal Reserve and the Federal Housing Finance Agency to compel release of details on the bailouts. He has been represented in the cases by Judicial Watch. In one of the cases against the Board of Governors of the Federal Reserve requesting Bear Stearns-related documents, Judicial Watch filed a writ of certiorari on behalf of McKinley requesting that the Supreme Court review the decision of the United States Court of Appeals for the District of Columbia Circuit. Another case against the FDIC seeking documents on Citigroup, Bank of America and the Temporary Liquidity Guarantee Program was sent back to the agency to supplement its responses. In a case against the Federal Housing Finance Agency the agency was ordered to produce documents regarding the choice to place Fannie Mae and Freddie Mac into conservatorship for review. The final case against the Board of Governors of the Federal Reserve requesting American International Group and Lehman Brothers-related documents, resulted in the release of about 2,388 pages of redacted documents.

More recently, McKinley has begun litigation to support his work on his second book to obtain records on the solvency of Citibank and the contemplation of placing the bank under FDIC receivership during 2008.

McKinley has been credited with correctly predicting in 1997 that the structure of Fannie Mae and Freddie Mac would one day lead to the meltdown of the two institutions. At that time, he called Fannie Mae and Freddie Mac "financial time bombs."

McKinley has testified before a Subcommittee of Congress on issues related to U.S. consumer bankruptcy policy.

== Books ==
- Borrowed Time: Two Centuries of Booms, Busts and Bailouts at Citi, (with James Freeman) HarperCollins, 2018.
- Financing Failure: A Century of Bailouts, Independent Institute, 2012.

== 2008 Congressional election ==
In 2007, McKinley announced his 2008 bid for the United States Congress in the 10th congressional district. McKinley's campaign centered on his experience as a policy advisor to the U.S. and foreign governments, his legal and government experience, and domestic and international policy issues. McKinley positioned himself as a traditional small government Republican in the campaign. Throughout the campaign Congressman Wolf refused to debate. McKinley lost the June 10, 2008, Republican primary with 9% of the vote to Wolf's 91%.
