= Glenn McClanan =

American politician

Member of the Virginia House of Delegates from the 84th district
- In office January 12, 1983 – January 8, 1992
- Preceded by: District created
- Succeeded by: Bob McDonnell

Member of the Virginia House of Delegates from the 38th district
- In office January 13, 1982 – January 12, 1983

Member of the Virginia House of Delegates from the 40th district
- In office January 12, 1972 – January 13, 1982

Personal details
- Born: February 16, 1934 Virginia Beach, Virginia
- Died: January 26, 2012 (aged 77) Virginia Beach, Virginia
- Party: Democratic

Glenn McClanan (February 16, 1934 – January 26, 2012) was an American politician who served in the Virginia House of Delegates from 1972 to 1992.

He was married to Virginia Beach City Council member, Reba S. McClanan, and studied at Lynchburg College and the University of Virginia Law School. He died on January 26, 2012, in Virginia Beach, Virginia at age 77.
