= 2006 United States House of Representatives elections in Virginia =

- November 4, 2006

All 11 Virginia seats to the United States House of Representatives
	Majority party	Minority party
Party	Republican	Democratic
Last election	8 seats, 60.50%	3 seats, 34.06%
Seats before	8	3
Seats won	8	3
Seat change	Steady	Steady
Popular vote	1,222,790	947,103
Percentage	53.23%	41.23%
Swing	▼7.27%	▲7.17%

Republican
40–50%
50–60%
60–70%
70–80%
80–90%
Democratic
50–60%
60–70%
70–80%
80–90%
90–100%

The 2006 United States House of Representatives elections in Virginia were held on November 7, 2006 to determine who will represent the Commonwealth of Virginia in the United States House of Representatives. Virginia has eleven seats in the House, apportioned according to the 2000 United States census. Representatives are elected for two-year terms.

== Overview ==
=== Statewide ===
Party	Candidates	Votes		Seats		
Party	Candidates	No.	%	No.	+/–	%
Republican	10	1,222,790	53.23	8	Steady	71.43
Democratic	9	947,103	41.23	3	Steady	28.57
Independent Greens	4	64,000	2.79	0	Steady	0.0
Independents	4	51,711	2.25	0	Steady	0.0
Libertarian	1	2,107	0.09	0	Steady	0.0
Write-in	11	9,525	0.41	0	Steady	0.0
Total	39	2,297,236	100.0	11	Steady	100.0

Popular vote
Republican	53.23%
Democratic	41.23%
Independent Greens	2.79%
Other	2.75%

House seats
Republican	72.73%
Democratic	27.27%

=== By district ===
Results of the 2006 United States House of Representatives elections in Virginia by district:

District	Republican		Democratic		Others		Total		Result
District	Votes	%	Votes	%	Votes	%	Votes	%	Result
District 1	143,889	62.96%	81,083	35.48%	3,562	1.56%	228,534	100.0%	Republican hold
District 2	88,777	51.27%	83,901	48.45%	481	0.28%	173,159	100.0%	Republican hold
District 3	0	0.00%	133,546	96.08%	5,448	3.92%	138,994	100.0%	Democratic hold
District 4	150,967	76.12%	0	0.00%	47,373	23.88%	198,340	100.0%	Republican hold
District 5	125,370	59.11%	84,682	39.93%	2,027	0.96%	212,079	100.0%	Republican hold
District 6	153,187	75.09%	0	0.00%	50,808	24.91%	203,995	100.0%	Republican hold
District 7	163,706	63.85%	88,206	34.40%	4,485	1.75%	256,397	100.0%	Republican hold
District 8	66,639	30.58%	144,700	66.40%	6,570	3.02%	217,909	100.0%	Democratic hold
District 9	61,574	32.17%	129,705	67.76%	136	0.07%	191,415	100.0%	Democratic hold
District 10	138,213	57.32%	98,769	40.96%	4,152	1.72%	241,134	100.0%	Republican hold
District 11	130,468	55.45%	102,511	43.57%	2,301	0.98%	235,280	100.0%	Republican hold
Total	1,222,790	53.23%	947,103	41.23%	127,343	5.54%	2,297,236	100.0%	

== District 1 ==
2006 Virginia's 1st congressional district election
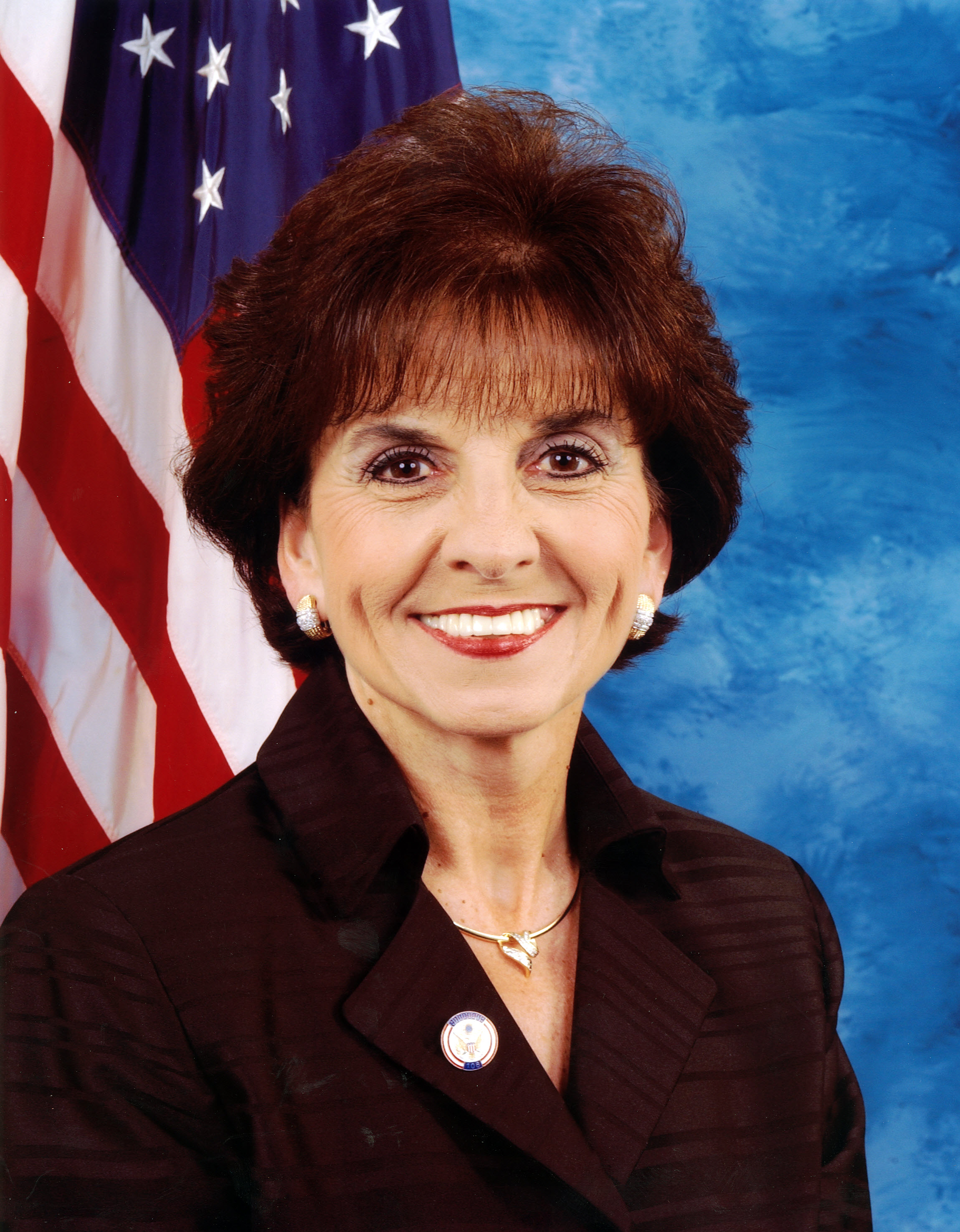

Nominee	Jo Ann Davis	Shawn O'Donnell
Party	Republican	Democratic
Popular vote	143,889	81,083
Percentage	63.0%	35.5%
- County and independent city results Davis: 40–50% 50–60% 60–70% 70–80% Odonnell: 50–60%
U.S. Representative before election
Jo Ann Davis
Republican
Elected U.S. Representative
Jo Ann Davis
Republican

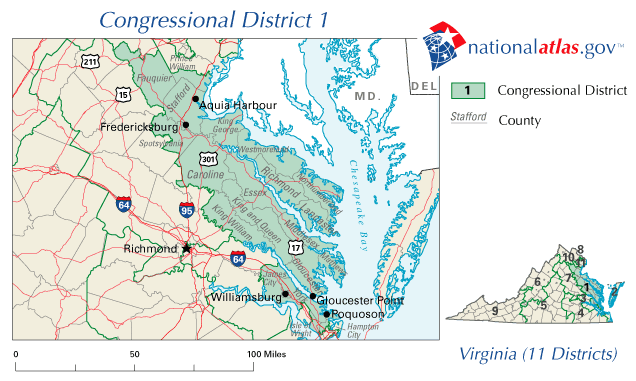

Incumbent Republican Jo Ann Davis, who had represented the district since 2001, ran for re-election. She was re-elected with 78.5% of the vote in 2004 and the district had a PVI of R+9.

=== Republican primary ===
==== Candidates ====
===== Nominee =====
- Jo Ann Davis, incumbent U.S. Representative

=== Democratic primary ===
==== Candidates ====
===== Nominee =====
- Shawn O'Donnell, activist and businessman

=== Independent Greens primary ===
==== Candidates ====
===== Nominee =====
- Marvin Pixton III, businessman and retired Marine Colonel

=== General election ===
==== Endorsements ====
Jo Ann Davis (R)

Newspapers and publications

- Esquire
Shawn O'Donnell (D)

Labor unions

- AFL-CIO

==== Predictions ====
Source	Ranking	As of
The Cook Political Report	Safe R	November 6, 2006
Rothenberg	Safe R	November 6, 2006
Sabato's Crystal Ball	Safe R	November 6, 2006
Real Clear Politics	Safe R	November 7, 2006
CQ Politics	Safe R	November 7, 2006

==== Results ====
Virginia's 1st congressional district election, 2006
Party	Candidate	Votes	%
Republican	Jo Ann Davis (incumbent)	143,889	63.0
Democratic	Shawn O'Donnell	81,083	35.5
Independent Greens	Marvin Pixton III	3,236	1.4
Write-in		326	0.1
Majority		62,806	27.5
Total votes		228,534	100.0
Republican hold			

== District 2 ==
2006 Virginia's 2nd congressional district election
- November 7, 2006
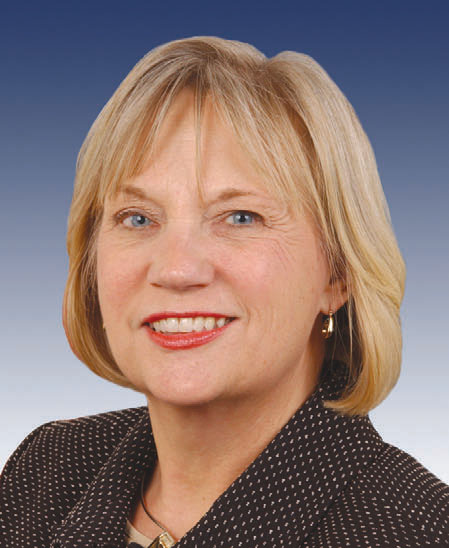

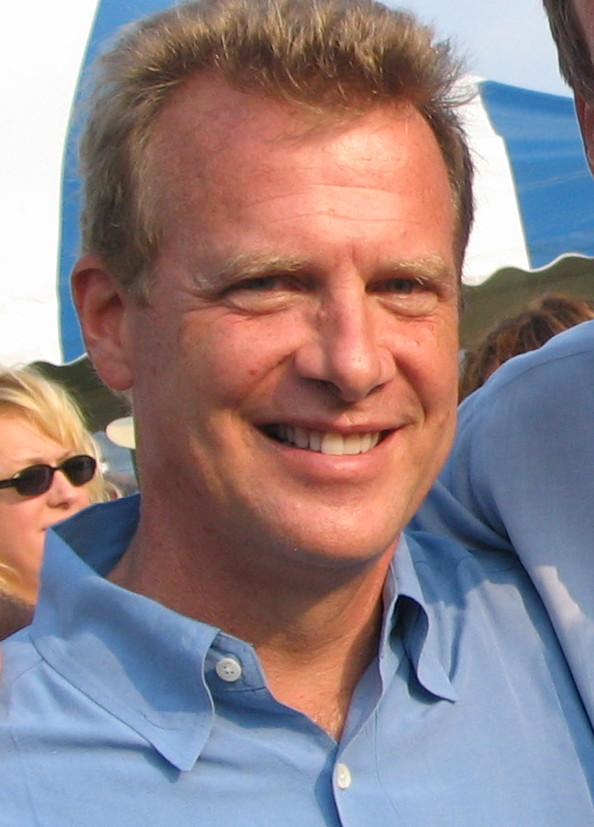
Nominee	Thelma Drake	Phillip Kellam
Party	Republican	Democratic
Popular vote	88,777	83,901
Percentage	51.26%	48.45%
- County and independent city results Drake: 50–60% Kellam: 50–60%
U.S. Representative before election
Thelma Drake
Republican
Elected U.S. Representative
Thelma Drake
Republican

Incumbent Republican Thelma Drake, who had represented the district since 2005, ran for re-election. She was elected with 55.1% of the vote in 2004 and the district had a PVI of R+6.

=== Republican primary ===
==== Candidates ====
===== Nominee =====
- Thelma Drake, incumbent U.S. Representative

===== Declined =====
- Paul Lanteigne, Virginia Beach Sheriff and candidate for this seat in 2004

=== Democratic primary ===
==== Candidates ====
===== Nominee =====
- Phillip Kellam, Commissioner of the Revenue for Virginia Beach

===== Withdrawn =====
- David Ashe, attorney, Marine reservist and nominee for this seat in 2004

=== General election ===
==== Campaign ====
During the campaign it was revealed that Kellam had pled guilty to assaulting a woman 28 years earlier when he was a student in North Carolina.

==== Endorsements ====
Thelma Drake (R)

Newspapers and publications

- The Virginian-Pilot
Phillip Kellam (D)

Labor unions

- AFL-CIO

Organizations

- Democratic Congressional Campaign Committee "Red to Blue" Program

Newspapers and publications

- Esquire

==== Polling ====
Poll source	Date(s) administered	Sample size (Note: Key: A – all adults RV – registered voters LV – likely voters V – unclear)	Margin of error	Thelma Drake (R)	Phillip Kellam (D)	Undecided
Zogby (Reuters)	October 24–29, 2006	500 (LV)	±4.5%	51%	43%	6%
RT Strategies and Constituent Dynamics	October 24–26, 2006	989 (LV)	±?%	45%	50%	5%
Mason-Dixon (The Virginian-Pilot/WVEC-TV)	October 23–24, 2006	400 (LV)	±5.0%	46%	44%	10%
RT Strategies and Constituent Dynamics	October 8–10, 2006	982 (LV)	±?%	48%	46%	6%
Zogby (Reuters)	September 25–October 2, 2006	500 (LV)	±4.5%	42%	46%	10%
McLaughlin & Associates (R–Drake)	August 28–29, 2006	300 (LV)	±5.6%	48%	41%	11%
RT Strategies and Constituent Dynamics	August 27–29, 2006	1,021 (RV)	±3.1%	43%	51%	6%
Cooper & Secrest Associates (D)	June 27–28, 2006	? (V)	±4.4%	42%	45%	13%

==== Predictions ====
Source	Ranking	As of
The Cook Political Report	Tossup	November 6, 2006
Rothenberg	Tossup	November 6, 2006
Sabato's Crystal Ball	Tilt R	November 6, 2006
Real Clear Politics	Lean R	November 7, 2006
CQ Politics	Lean R	November 7, 2006

==== Results ====
Virginia's 2nd congressional district election, 2006
Party	Candidate	Votes	%
Republican	Thelma Drake (incumbent)	88,777	51.3
Democratic	Phillip Kellam	83,901	48.5
Write-in		481	0.3
Majority		4,876	2.8
Total votes		173,159	100.0
Republican hold			

== District 3 ==
2006 Virginia's 3rd congressional district election
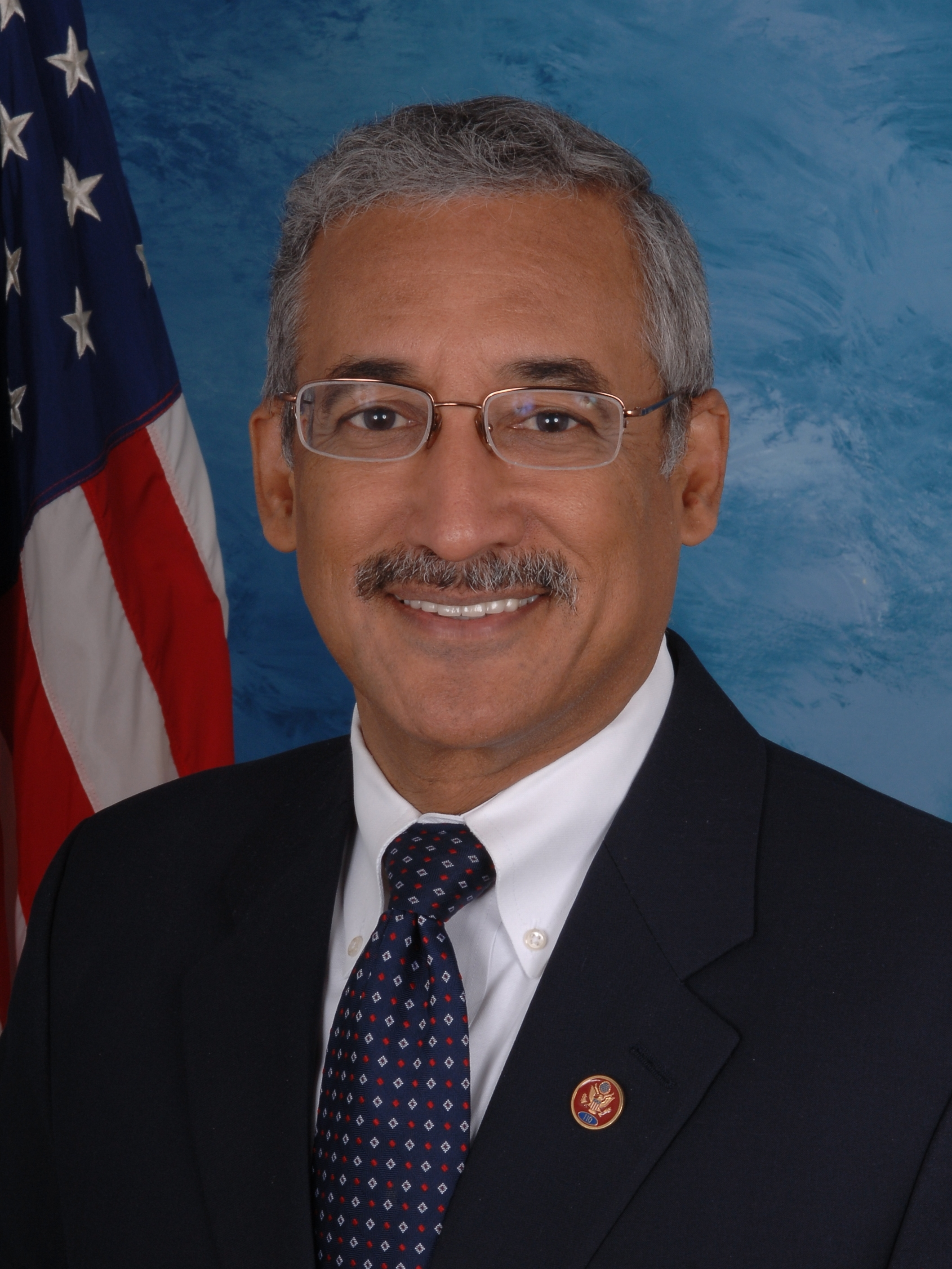
Nominee	Bobby Scott
Party	Democratic
Popular vote	133,546
Percentage	96.1%
U.S. Representative before election
Bobby Scott
Democratic
Elected U.S. Representative
Bobby Scott
Democratic

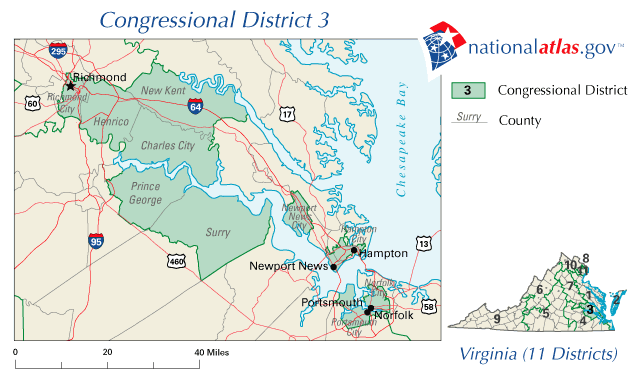

Incumbent Democrat Bobby Scott, who had represented the district since 1993, ran for re-election. He was re-elected with 69.3% of the vote in 2004 and the district had a PVI of D+18.

=== Democratic primary ===
==== Candidates ====
===== Nominee =====
- Bobby Scott, incumbent U.S. Representative

=== Republican primary ===
==== Candidates ====
===== Declined =====
- Winsome Earle-Sears, former state delegate and nominee for this seat in 2004

=== General election ===
==== Endorsements ====
Bobby Scott (D)

Labor unions

- AFL-CIO

Newspapers and publications

- Esquire

==== Predictions ====
Source	Ranking	As of
The Cook Political Report	Safe D	November 6, 2006
Rothenberg	Safe D	November 6, 2006
Sabato's Crystal Ball	Safe D	November 6, 2006
Real Clear Politics	Safe D	November 7, 2006
CQ Politics	Safe D	November 7, 2006

==== Results ====
Virginia's 3rd congressional district election, 2006
Party	Candidate	Votes	%
Democratic	Bobby Scott (incumbent)	133,546	96.1
Write-in		5,448	3.9
Majority		128,098	92.2
Total votes		138,994	100.0
Democratic hold			

== District 4 ==
2006 Virginia's 4th congressional district election
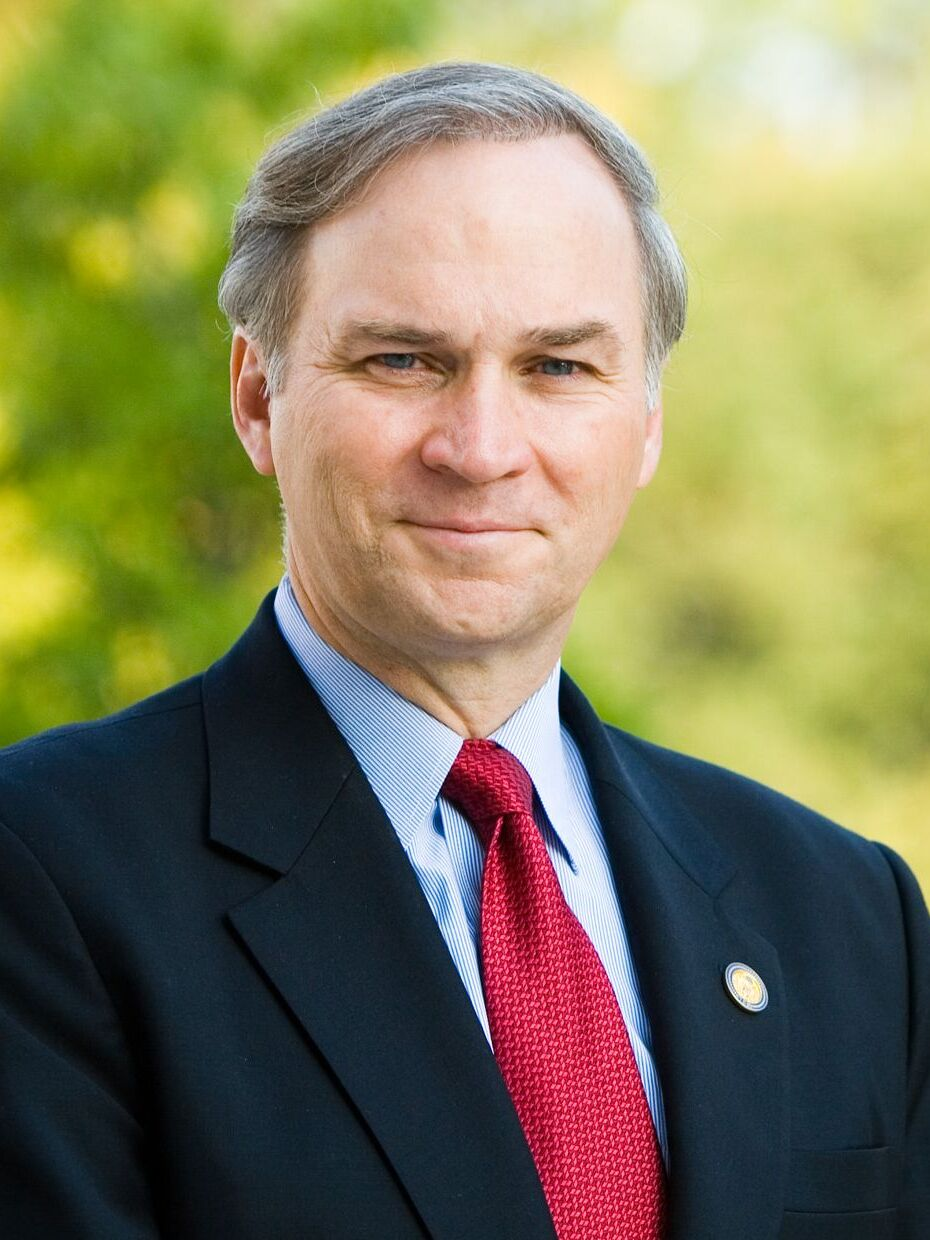

Nominee	Randy Forbes	Albert Burckhard
Party	Republican	Independent Greens
Popular vote	150,967	46,487
Percentage	76.1%	23.4%
- County results Forbes: 60–70% 70–80% 80–90%
U.S. Representative before election
Randy Forbes
Republican
Elected U.S. Representative
Randy Forbes
Republican

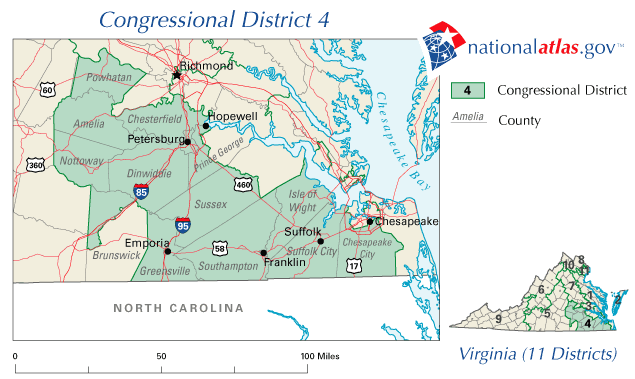

Incumbent Republican Randy Forbes, who had represented the district since 2001, ran for re-election. He was re-elected with 64.5% of the vote in 2004 and the district had a PVI of R+5.

=== Republican primary ===
==== Candidates ====
===== Nominee =====
- Randy Forbes, incumbent U.S. Representative

=== Democratic primary ===
No Democrats filed to run.

=== Independent Greens primary ===
==== Candidates ====
===== Nominee =====
- Albert Burckhard, teacher and retired US Army Lieutenant colonel

=== General election ===
==== Predictions ====
Source	Ranking	As of
The Cook Political Report	Safe R	November 6, 2006
Rothenberg	Safe R	November 6, 2006
Sabato's Crystal Ball	Safe R	November 6, 2006
Real Clear Politics	Safe R	November 7, 2006
CQ Politics	Safe R	November 7, 2006

==== Results ====
Virginia's 4th congressional district election, 2006
Party	Candidate	Votes	%
Republican	Randy Forbes (incumbent)	150,967	76.1
Independent Greens	Albert Burckhard	46,487	23.4
Write-in		886	0.4
Majority		104,480	52.7
Total votes		198,340	100.0
Republican hold			

== District 5 ==
2006 Virginia's 5th congressional district election
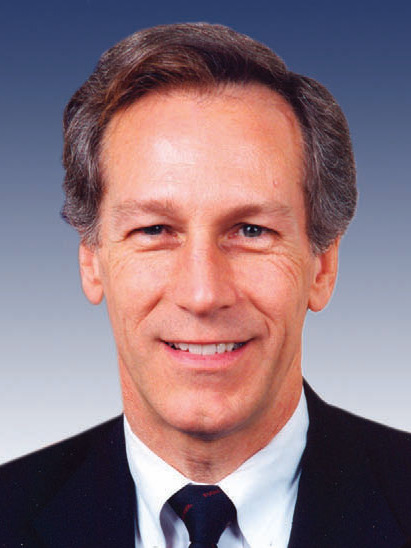

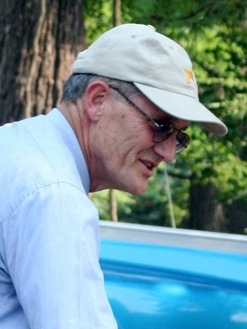
Candidate	Virgil Goode	Al Weed
Party	Republican	Democratic
Popular vote	125,370	84,682
Percentage	59.1%	39.9%
- County and independent city results Goode: 50–60% 60–70% 70–80% Weed: 50–60% 70–80%
U.S. Representative before election
Virgil Goode
Republican
Elected U.S. Representative
Virgil Goode
Republican

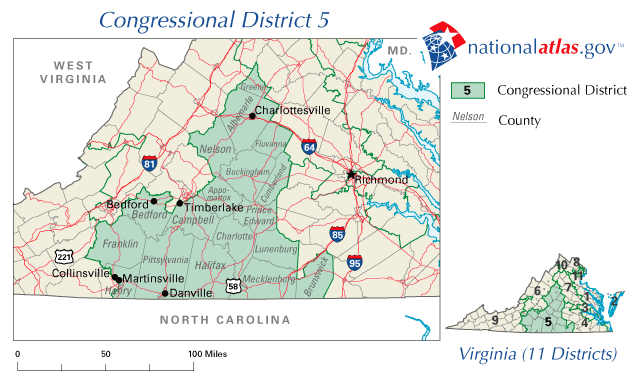

Incumbent Republican Virgil Goode, who had represented the district since 1997, ran for re-election. He was re-elected with 63.7% of the vote in 2004 and the district had a PVI of R+6.

=== Republican primary ===
==== Candidates ====
===== Nominee =====
- Virgil Goode, incumbent U.S. Representative

=== Democratic primary ===
==== Candidates ====
===== Nominee =====
- Al Weed, orchardist, retired Green Beret and nominee for this seat in 2004

=== Independent Greens primary ===
==== Candidates ====
===== Nominee =====
- Joseph Oddo, freelance writer and nominee for the 11th district in 2004

=== General election ===
==== Endorsements ====
Al Weed (D)

Labor unions

- AFL-CIO

Newspapers and publications

- Esquire

Individuals

- Wesley Clark, retired Army General and 2004 democratic presidential candidate

==== Polling ====
Poll source	Date(s) administered	Sample size	Margin of error	Virgil Goode (R)	Al Weed (D)	Joseph Oddo (IG)	Undecided
SurveyUSA (WDBJ-TV)	October 30–November 1, 2006	530 (LV)	±4.2%	61%	35%	2%	2%
SurveyUSA (WDBJ-TV)	October 8–10, 2006	502 (LV)	±4.4%	56%	40%	2%	2%
SurveyUSA (WDBJ-TV)	July 23–25, 2006	417 (LV)	±4.8%	59%	35%	–	6%
Zogby International	June 26–28, 2006	601 (LV)	±4.1%	49%	35%	–	16%

==== Predictions ====
Source	Ranking	As of
The Cook Political Report	Safe R	November 6, 2006
Rothenberg	Safe R	November 6, 2006
Sabato's Crystal Ball	Safe R	November 6, 2006
Real Clear Politics	Safe R	November 7, 2006
CQ Politics	Safe R	November 7, 2006

==== Results ====
Virginia's 5th congressional district election, 2006
Party	Candidate	Votes	%
Republican	Virgil Goode (incumbent)	125,370	59.1
Democratic	Al Weed	84,682	39.9
Independent Greens	Joseph Oddo	1,928	0.9
Write-in		99	0.0
Majority		40,688	19.2
Total votes		212,079	100.0
Republican hold			

== District 6 ==
2006 Virginia's 6th congressional district election
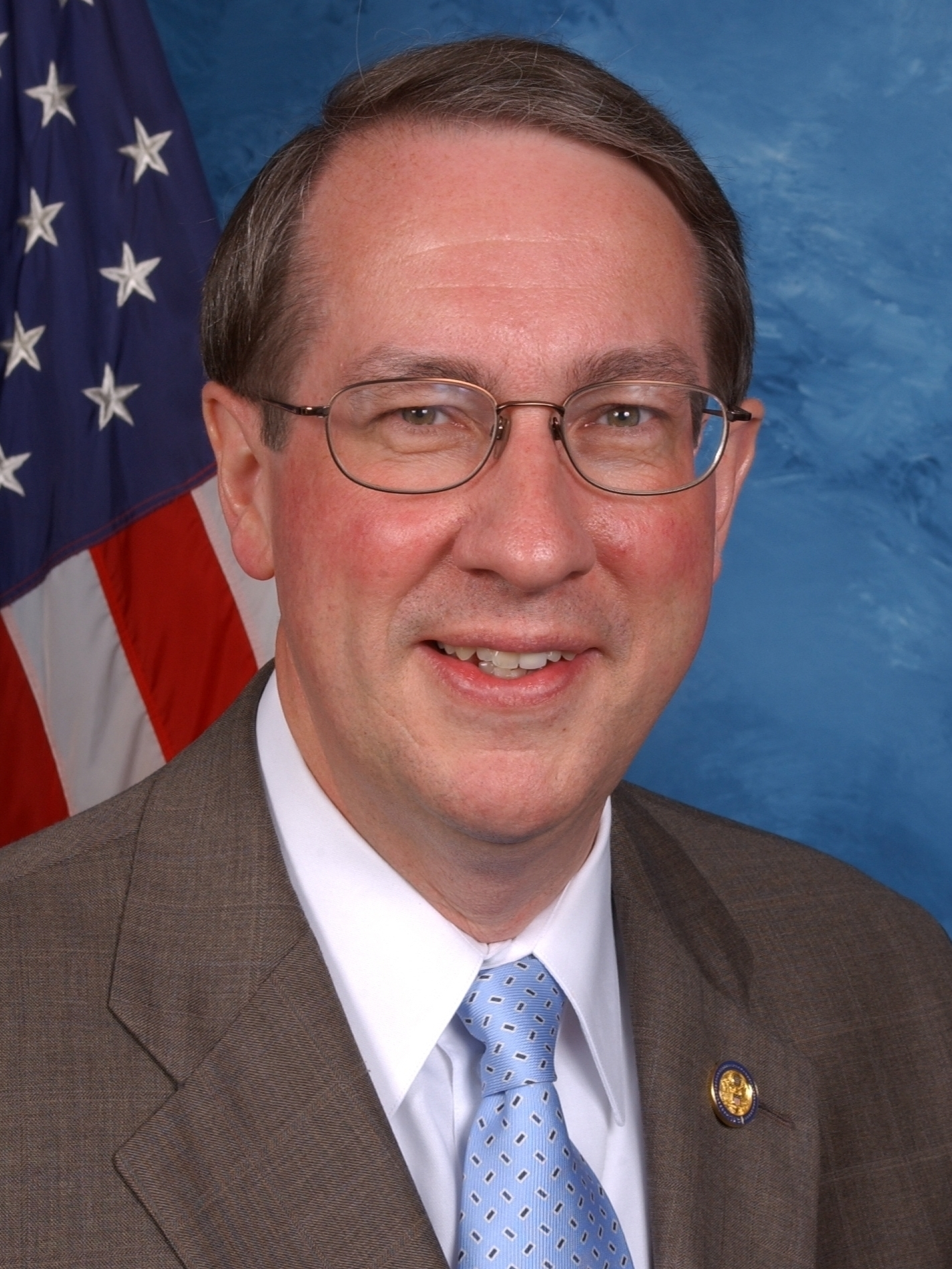

Nominee	Bob Goodlatte	Barbara Pryor	Andre Peery
Party	Republican	Independent	Independent
Popular vote	153,187	25,129	24,731
Percentage	75.1%	12.3%	12.1%
- County results Goodlatte: 50–60% 60–70% 70–80% 80–90%
U.S. Representative before election
Bob Goodlatte
Republican
Elected U.S. Representative
Bob Goodlatte
Republican

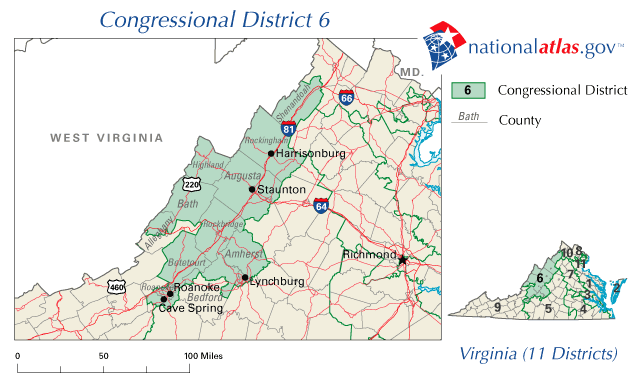

Incumbent Republican Bob Goodlatte, who had represented the district since 1993, ran for re-election. He was re-elected with 96.7% of the vote in 2004 and the district had a PVI of R+11.

=== Republican primary ===
==== Candidates ====
===== Nominee =====
- Bob Goodlatte, incumbent U.S. Representative

=== Democratic primary ===
No Democrats filed to run.

=== Other Candidates ===
- Andre Peery, ex-quality assurance specialist (Independent)
- Barbara Pryor, ex-magistrate (Independent)

=== General election ===
==== Endorsements ====
Bob Goodlatte (R)

Newspapers and publications

- Esquire

==== Predictions ====
Source	Ranking	As of
The Cook Political Report	Safe R	November 6, 2006
Rothenberg	Safe R	November 6, 2006
Sabato's Crystal Ball	Safe R	November 6, 2006
Real Clear Politics	Safe R	November 7, 2006
CQ Politics	Safe R	November 7, 2006

==== Results ====
Virginia's 6th congressional district election, 2006
Party	Candidate	Votes	%
Republican	Bob Goodlatte (incumbent)	153,187	75.1
Independent	Barbara Pryor	25,129	12.3
Independent	Andre Peery	24,731	12.1
Write-in		948	0.5
Majority		128,058	62.8
Total votes		203,995	100.0
Republican hold			

== District 7 ==
2006 Virginia's 7th congressional district election
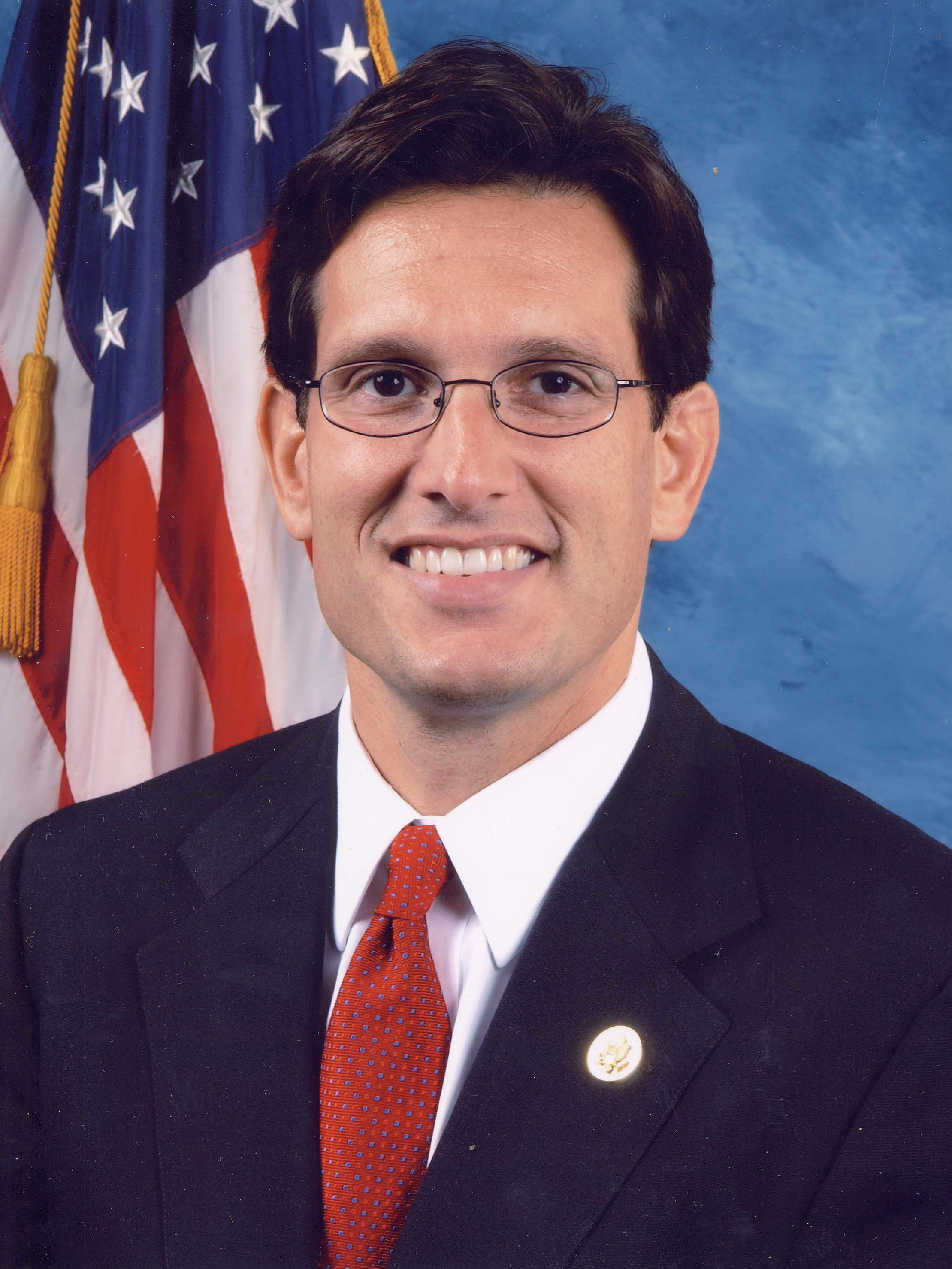

Nominee	Eric Cantor	Jim Nachman
Party	Republican	Democratic
Popular vote	163,706	88,206
Percentage	63.8%	34.4%
- County results Cantor: 40–50% 50–60% 60–70% 70–80%
U.S. Representative before election
Eric Cantor
Republican
Elected U.S. Representative
Eric Cantor
Republican

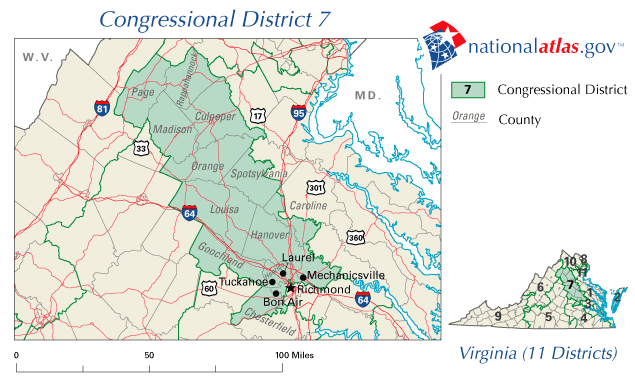

Incumbent Republican Eric Cantor, who had represented the district since 2002, ran for re-election. He was re-elected with 75.5% of the vote in 2004 and the district had a PVI of R+11.

=== Republican primary ===
==== Candidates ====
===== Nominee =====
- Eric Cantor, incumbent U.S. Representative

=== Democratic primary ===
==== Candidates ====
===== Nominee =====
- Jim Nachman, attorney

=== Independent Greens primary ===
==== Candidates ====
===== Nominee =====
- Brad Blanton, psychotherapist, author, and nominee for this seat in 2004, withdrew October 2008 and endorsed Nachman

=== General election ===
==== Endorsements ====
Jim Nachman (D)

Labor unions

- AFL-CIO

Newspapers and publications

- Esquire

==== Predictions ====
Source	Ranking	As of
The Cook Political Report	Safe R	November 6, 2006
Rothenberg	Safe R	November 6, 2006
Sabato's Crystal Ball	Safe R	November 6, 2006
Real Clear Politics	Safe R	November 7, 2006
CQ Politics	Safe R	November 7, 2006

==== Results ====
Virginia's 7th congressional district election, 2006
Party	Candidate	Votes	%
Republican	Eric Cantor (incumbent)	163,706	63.8
Democratic	Jim Nachman	88,206	34.4
Independent Greens	Brad Blanton (Withdrawn)	4,213	1.6
Write-in		272	0.1
Majority		75,500	29.4
Total votes		256,397	100.0
Republican hold			

== District 8 ==
2006 Virginia's 8th congressional district election
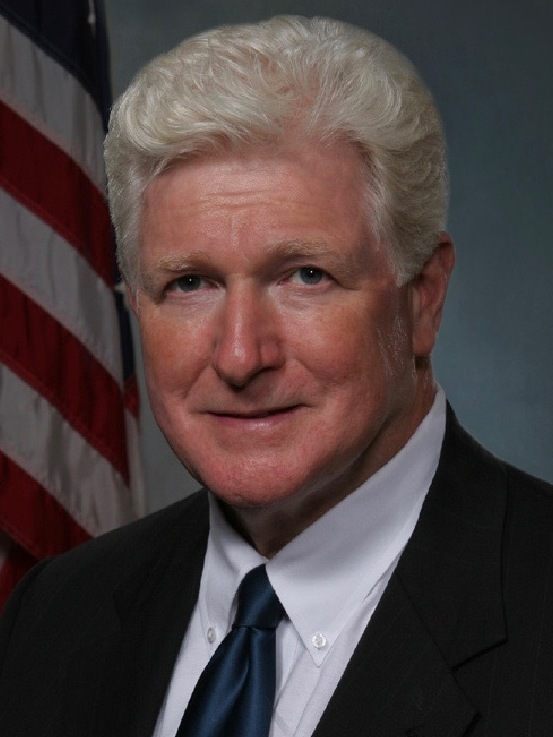

Nominee	Jim Moran	Tom O'Donoghue
Party	Democratic	Republican
Popular vote	144,700	66,639
Percentage	66.4%	30.6%
- County and independent city results Moran: 60–70%
U.S. Representative before election
Jim Moran
Democratic
Elected U.S. Representative
Jim Moran
Democratic

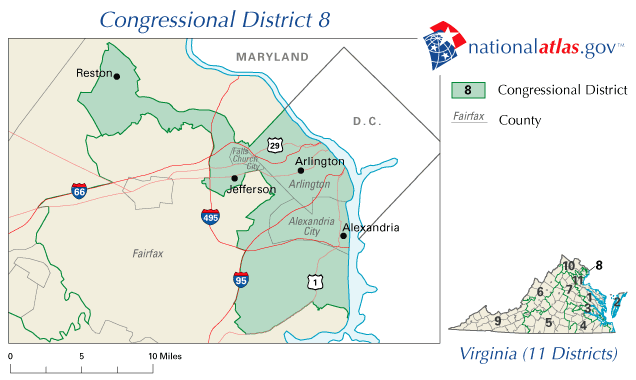

Incumbent Democrat Jim Moran, who had represented the district since 1985, ran for re-election. He was re-elected with 59.7% of the vote in 2004 and the district had a PVI of D+14.

=== Democratic primary ===
==== Candidates ====
===== Nominee =====
- Jim Moran, incumbent U.S. Representative

=== Republican primary ===
==== Candidates ====
===== Nominee =====
- Tom O'Donoghue, Army reservist and Iraq War veteran

===== Eliminated in primary =====
- Mark Ellmore, mortgage lender

==== Results ====
Republican primary results
Party	Candidate	Votes	%
Republican	Tom O'Donoghue	3,064	69.5
Republican	Mark Ellmore	1,345	30.5
Total votes		4,409	100.0

=== Independent Greens primary ===
==== Candidates ====
===== Nominee =====
- Jim Hurysz, consultant and nominee for this seat in 2004

=== General election ===
==== Endorsements ====
Jim Moran (D)

Labor unions

- AFL-CIO
Tom O'Donoghue (R)

Newspapers and publications

- Esquire

==== Predictions ====
Source	Ranking	As of
The Cook Political Report	Safe D	November 6, 2006
Rothenberg	Safe D	November 6, 2006
Sabato's Crystal Ball	Safe D	November 6, 2006
Real Clear Politics	Safe D	November 7, 2006
CQ Politics	Safe D	November 7, 2006

==== Results ====
Virginia's 8th congressional district election, 2006
Party	Candidate	Votes	%
Democratic	Jim Moran (incumbent)	144,700	66.4
Republican	Tom O'Donoghue	66,639	30.6
Independent Greens	Jim Hurysz	6,094	2.8
Write-in		476	0.2
Majority		78,061	35.8
Total votes		217,909	100.0
Democratic hold			

== District 9 ==
2006 Virginia's 9th congressional district election
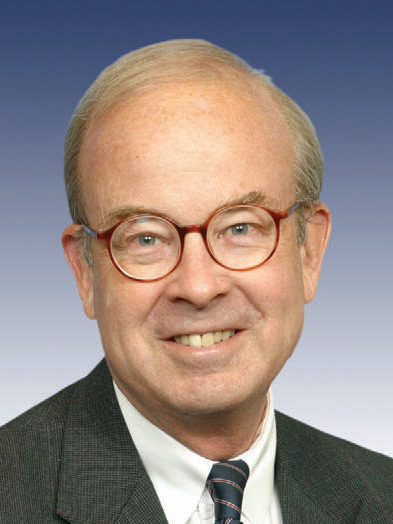

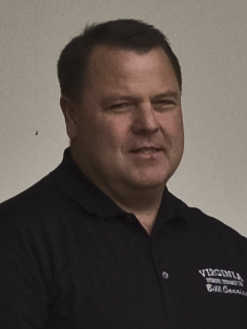
Candidate	Rick Boucher	Bill Carrico
Party	Democratic	Republican
Popular vote	129,705	61,574
Percentage	67.8%	32.2%
- County and independent city results Boucher: 50–60% 60–70% 70–80% 80–90%
U.S. Representative before election
Rick Boucher
Democratic
Elected U.S. Representative
Rick Boucher
Democratic

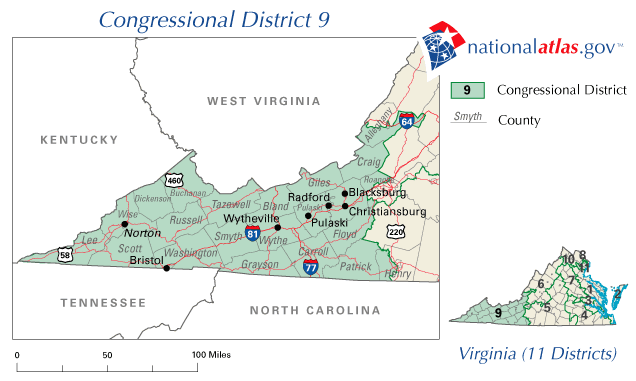

Incumbent Democrat Rick Boucher, who had represented the district since 1983, ran for re-election. He was re-elected with 59.3% of the vote in 2004 and the district had a PVI of R+7.

=== Democratic primary ===
==== Candidates ====
===== Nominee =====
- Rick Boucher, incumbent U.S. Representative

=== Republican primary ===
==== Candidates ====
===== Nominee =====
- Bill Carrico, state delegate

=== General election ===
==== Endorsements ====
Rick Boucher (D)

Labor unions

- AFL-CIO

Newspapers and publications

- Esquire

==== Polling ====
Poll source	Date(s) administered	Sample size	Margin of error	Rick Boucher (D)	Bill Carrico (R)	Undecided
SurveyUSA (WDBJ-TV)	October 8–10, 2006	440 (LV)	± 4.5%	66%	29%	5%

==== Predictions ====
Source	Ranking	As of
The Cook Political Report	Safe D	November 6, 2006
Rothenberg	Safe D	November 6, 2006
Sabato's Crystal Ball	Safe D	November 6, 2006
Real Clear Politics	Safe D	November 7, 2006
CQ Politics	Safe D	November 7, 2006

==== Results ====
Virginia's 9th congressional district election, 2006
Party	Candidate	Votes	%
Democratic	Rick Boucher (incumbent)	129,705	67.8
Republican	Bill Carrico	61,574	32.2
Write-in		136	0.1
Majority		68,131	35.6
Total votes		191,415	100.0
Democratic hold			

== District 10 ==
2006 Virginia's 10th congressional district election
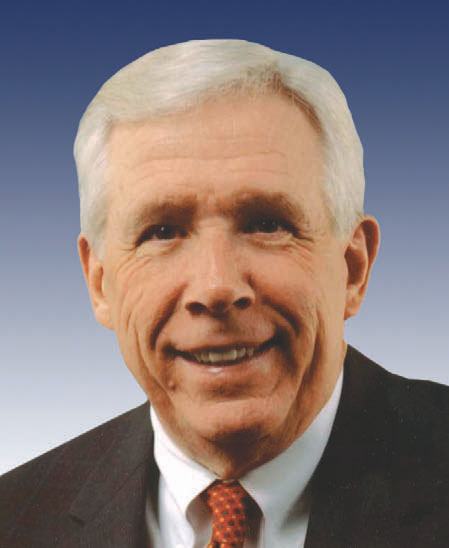

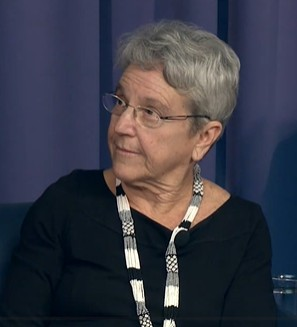
Nominee	Frank Wolf	Judy Feder
Party	Republican	Democratic
Popular vote	138,213	98,769
Percentage	57.3%	41.0%
- County and independent city results Wolf: 50–60% 60–70%
U.S. Representative before election
Frank Wolf
Republican
Elected U.S. Representative
Frank Wolf
Republican

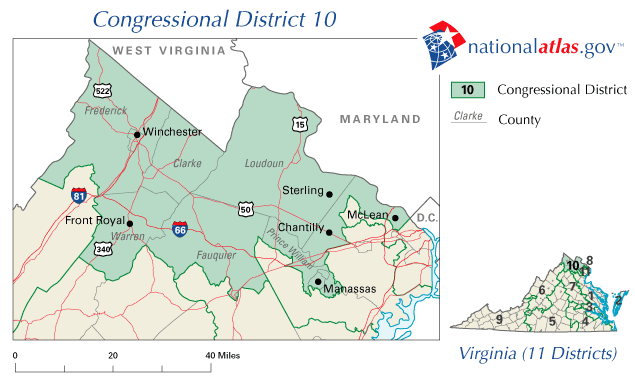

Incumbent Republican Frank Wolf, the Dean of the Virginia congressional delegation, who had represented the district since 1981, ran for re-election. He was re-elected with 63.8% of the vote in 2004 and the district had a PVI of R+5.

=== Republican primary ===
==== Candidates ====
===== Nominee =====
- Frank Wolf, incumbent U.S. Representative

=== Democratic primary ===
==== Candidates ====
===== Nominee =====
- Judy Feder, professor at Georgetown University

=== Libertarian primary ===
==== Candidates ====
===== Nominee =====
- Wilbur Wood III, optician and Chair of the 10th District's Libertarian Party

=== Other Candidates ===
- Neeraj C. Nigam, computer systems analyst (Independent)

=== General election ===
==== Endorsements ====
Frank Wolf (R)

Newspapers and publications

- Esquire
Judy Feder (D)

Labor unions

- AFL-CIO

Organizations

- Democratic Congressional Campaign Committee "Red to Blue" Program
- EMILY's List

Individuals

- Wesley Clark, retired Army General and 2004 democratic presidential candidate
Wilbur Wood III (L)

Organizations

- Independent Greens of Virginia

==== Polling ====
Poll source	Date(s) administered	Sample size	Margin of error	Frank Wolf (R)	Judy Feder (D)	Others	Undecided
RT Strategies and Constituent Dynamics	October 8–10, 2006	1004 (LV)	±3.1%	47%	42%	1%	10%

==== Predictions ====
Source	Ranking	As of
The Cook Political Report	Safe R	November 6, 2006
Rothenberg	Safe R	November 6, 2006
Sabato's Crystal Ball	Safe R	November 6, 2006
Real Clear Politics	Safe R	November 7, 2006
CQ Politics	Safe R	November 7, 2006

==== Results ====
Virginia's 10th congressional district election, 2006
Party	Candidate	Votes	%
Republican	Frank Wolf (incumbent)	138,213	57.3
Democratic	Judy Feder	98,769	41.0
Libertarian	Wilbur Wood III	2,107	0.9
Independent	Neeraj Nigam	1,851	0.8
Write-in		194	0.1
Majority		39,444	16.4
Total votes		241,134	100.0
Republican hold			

== District 11 ==
2006 Virginia's 11th congressional district election
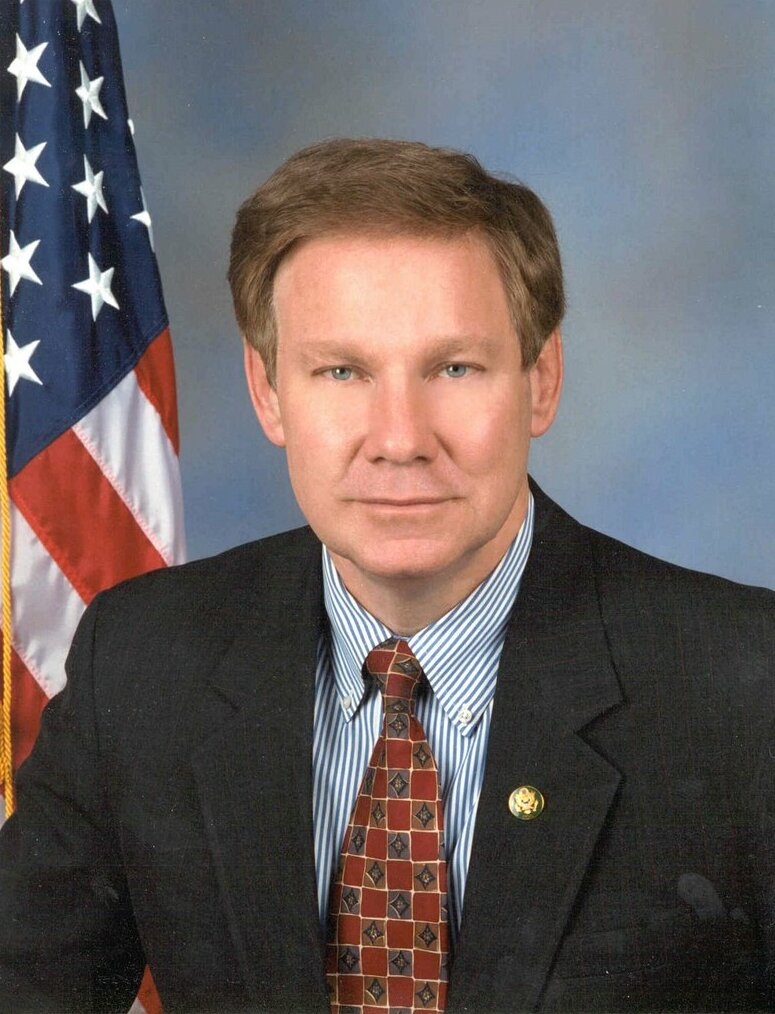

Nominee	Tom Davis	Andrew Hurst
Party	Republican	Democratic
Popular vote	130,468	102,411
Percentage	55.5%	43.5%
- County results Davis: 50–60%
U.S. Representative before election
Tom Davis
Republican
Elected U.S. Representative
Tom Davis
Republican

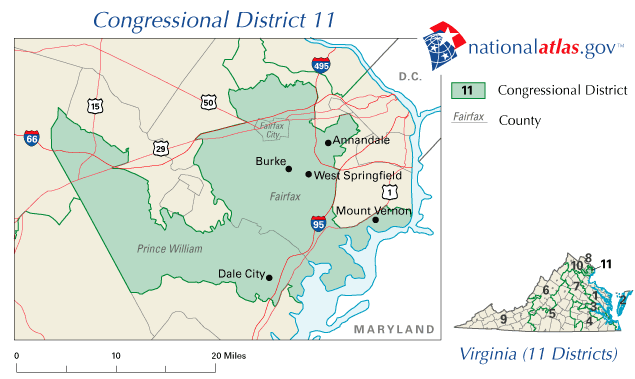

Incumbent Republican Tom Davis, who had represented the district since 1995, ran for re-election. He was re-elected with 60.3% of the vote in 2004 and the district had a PVI of R+1.

=== Republican primary ===
==== Candidates ====
===== Nominee =====
- Tom Davis, incumbent U.S. Representative

=== Democratic primary ===
==== Candidates ====
===== Nominee =====
- Andrew Hurst, attorney

===== Eliminated in primary =====
- Ken Longmyer, retired foreign service officer and nominee for this seat in 2004

==== Results ====
Democratic primary results
Party	Candidate	Votes	%
Democratic	Andrew Hurst	10,831	55.1
Democratic	Ken Longmyer	8,818	44.9
Total votes		19,649	100.0

=== Independent Greens primary ===
==== Candidates ====
===== Nominee =====
- Ferdinando Greco, businessman

=== General election ===
==== Endorsements ====
Tom Davis (R)

Newspapers and publications

- Esquire

==== Predictions ====
Source	Ranking	As of
The Cook Political Report	Likely R	November 6, 2006
Rothenberg	Safe R	November 6, 2006
Sabato's Crystal Ball	Lean R	November 6, 2006
Real Clear Politics	Safe R	November 7, 2006
CQ Politics	Likely R	November 7, 2006

==== Results ====
Virginia's 11th congressional district election, 2006
Party	Candidate	Votes	%
Republican	Tom Davis (incumbent)	130,468	55.5
Democratic	Andrew Hurst	102,411	43.5
Independent Greens	Ferdinando Greco	2,042	0.9
Write-in		259	0.1
Majority		28,057	11.9
Total votes		235,280	100.0
Republican hold			
