= 2004 Virginia ballot measures =

The 2004 Virginia State Elections took place on Election Day, November 2, 2004, the same day as the Presidential and the U.S. House elections in the state. The only statewide elections on the ballot were two constitutional referendums to amend the Virginia State Constitution. Because Virginia state elections are held on off-years, no statewide officers or state legislative elections were held. All referendums were referred to the voters by the Virginia General Assembly.

== Question 1 ==
The Apportionment Act amendment clarifies provisions concerning the effective date and implementation of decennial redistricting laws, especially when political vacancies occur.

Question 1
Choice	Votes	%
For	2,364,027	85.80
Against	391,100	14.20
Total	2,755,127	100.00
Source: - Official Results

== Question 2 ==
The Succession to the Office of Governor Act amendment clarifies who will become the acting Governor of Virginia in the event of a sudden death, resignation, or other emergency circumstance. It adds the acting Speaker of the Virginia House of Delegates, President pro tempore of the Virginia Senate, and majority leader of the Virginia Senate to the list of officials that would succeed the Governor in such an instance (after the Lieutenant Governor of Virginia, the Attorney General of Virginia, and the Speaker of the Virginia House of Delegates, which were already part of the list of succession). The amendment also allows the Virginia General Assembly to temporarily waive certain eligibility requirements in order for the Attorney General, Speaker, or acting Speaker to serve as acting Governor in the event of an emergency.

Question 2
Choice	Votes	%
For	2,420,882	87.22
Against	354,640	12.78
Total	2,775,522	100.00
Source: - Official Results
