= Frank Wolf (politician) =

U.S. congressman who represented Virginia (born 1939)

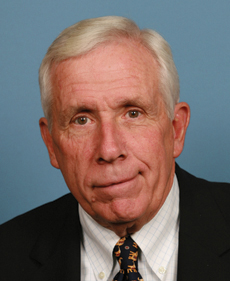

Member of the U.S. House of Representatives from Virginia's 10th district
- In office January 3, 1981 – January 3, 2015
- Preceded by: Joe Fisher
- Succeeded by: Barbara Comstock

Personal details
- Born: Frank Rudolph Wolf; January 30, 1939 (age 87) Philadelphia, Pennsylvania, U.S.
- Party: Republican
- Spouse: Carolyn Stover
- Children: 5
- Education: Pennsylvania State University (BA); Georgetown University (LLB)

Military service
- Branch/service: United States Army
- Years of service: 1962–1963 (active); 1963–1967 (reserve)
- Unit: Signal Corps (Reserve)
- Wolf's voice Wolf on an FY2002 appropriations bill for the Commerce, Justice, and State departments and the judiciary. Recorded November 14, 2001

Frank Rudolph Wolf (born January 30, 1939) is an American politician who served as the U.S. representative for Virginia's 10th congressional district from 1981 to 2015. A member of the Republican Party, he announced in December 2013 that he would not seek re-election in 2014. He was succeeded by his former chief of staff and Republican state delegate Barbara Comstock. At the time of his retirement, he was the dean of the state's congressional delegation, having served for 34 consecutive years.

== Early life, education and early political career ==
Born and raised in Philadelphia, Wolf overcame an early speech impediment which caused him to stutter. Attending Pennsylvania State University, he was a member of Alpha Sigma Phi fraternity, received a degree in political science and subsequently earned a law degree from Georgetown University Law Center in Washington, D.C. He then joined the United States Army as a reservist and became a lawyer for the military.

Wolf entered politics in 1968, at the age of 29, when he became a legislative assistant to Edward Biester, the Republican congressman from Pennsylvania's 8th congressional district. From 1971 to 1975, Wolf served as an assistant to Secretary of the Interior Rogers Morton.

== U.S. House of Representatives ==
=== Elections ===
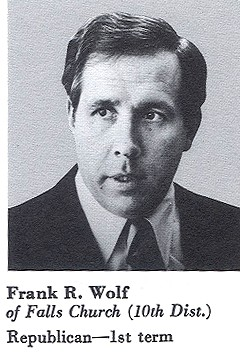
1981, Congressional Pictorial Directory, Wolf as a first term Congressman

During the 1976 presidential election year, Wolf's first campaign for Virginia's 10th congressional district ended with his loss in the Republican primary to Vince Callahan by 45%–42%. Two years later, amidst the 1978 midterm elections, he won the Republican nomination unopposed, but lost the general election to the incumbent Democrat, Joseph L. Fisher, 53%–47%.

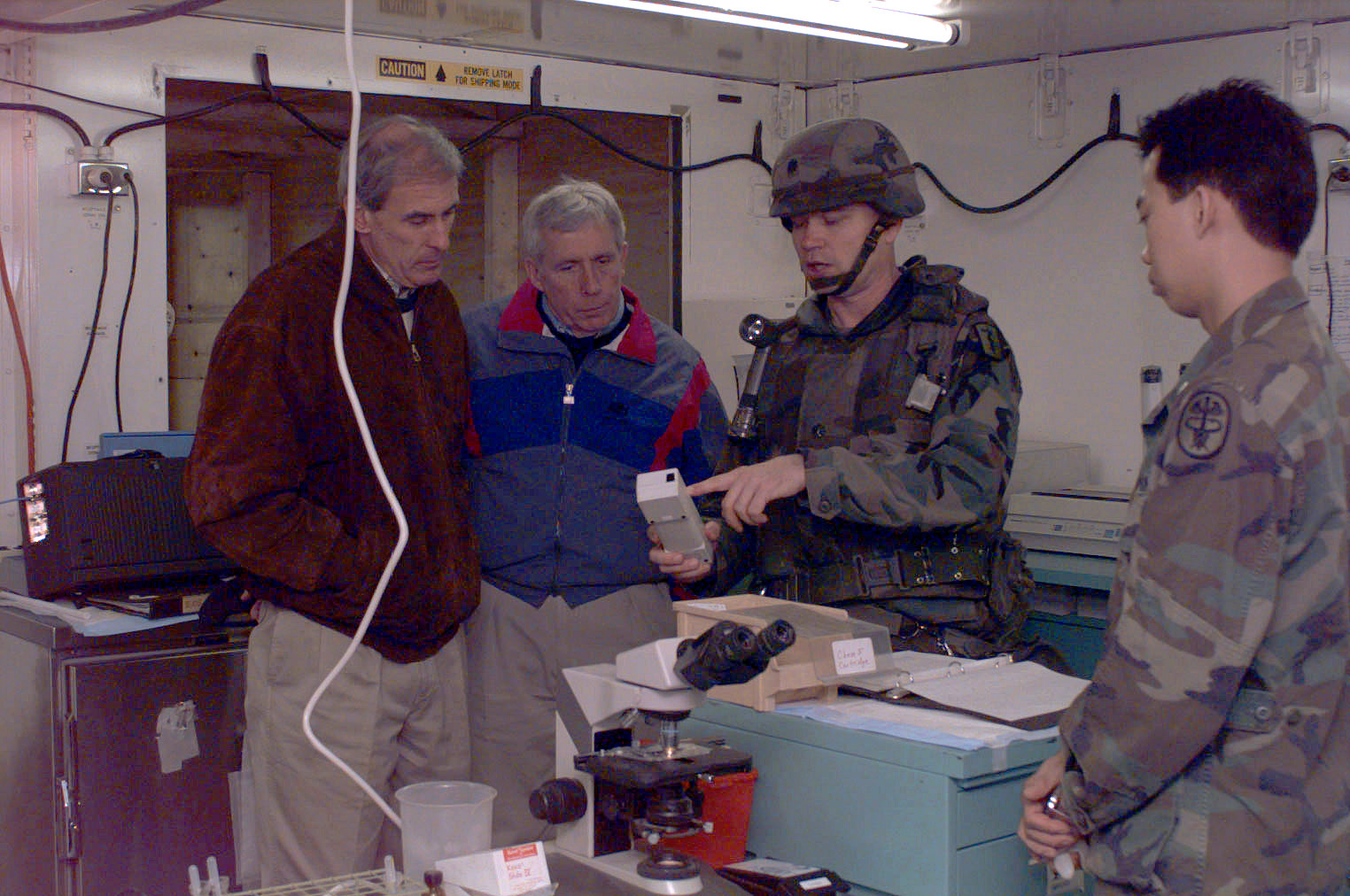
Wolf and Senator Dan Coats visit the 212th Mobile Army Surgical Hospital at Camp Bedrock in Bosnia-Herzegovina during Operation Joint Endeavor in 1996

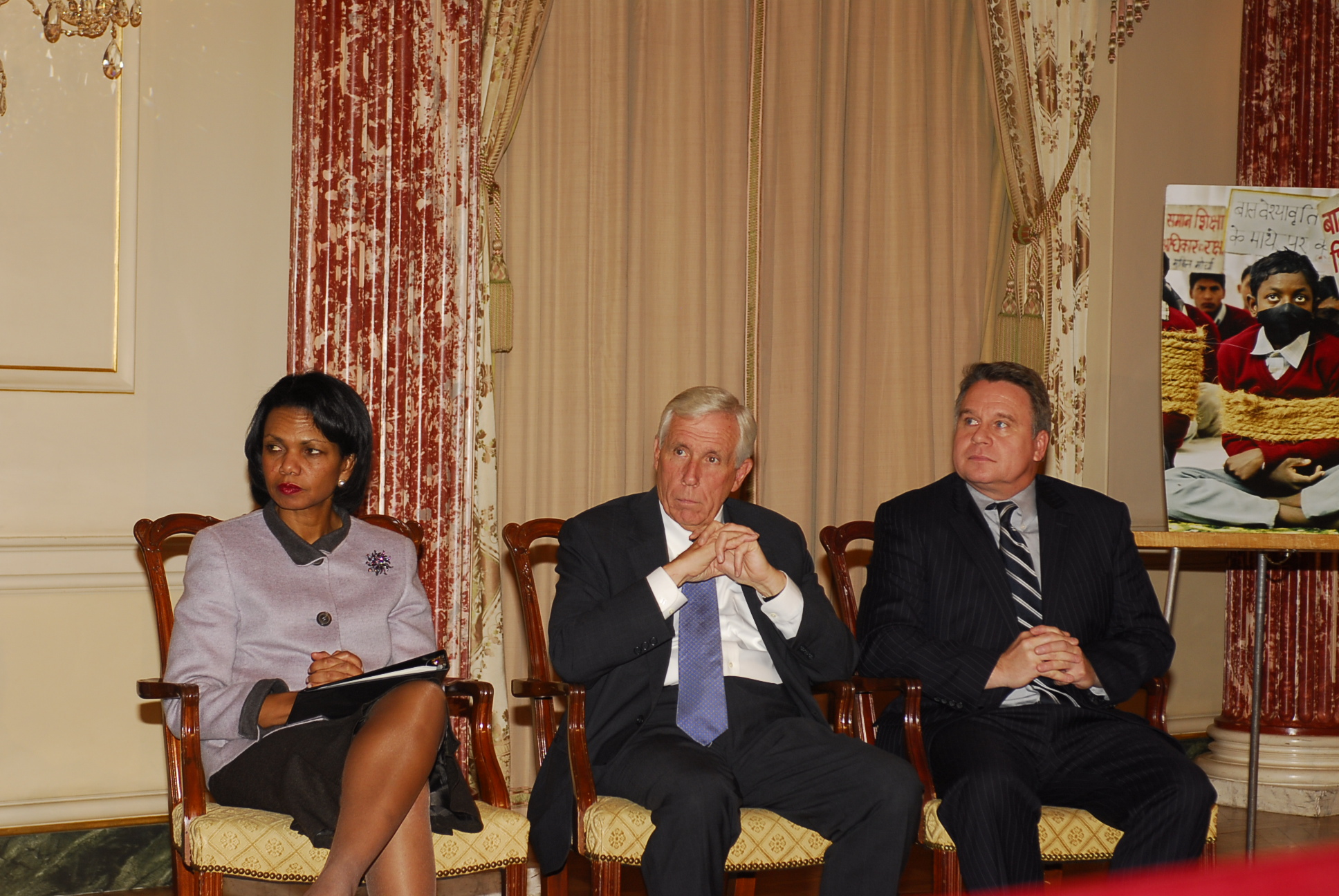
Wolf with Chris Smith and Condoleezza Rice in 2006

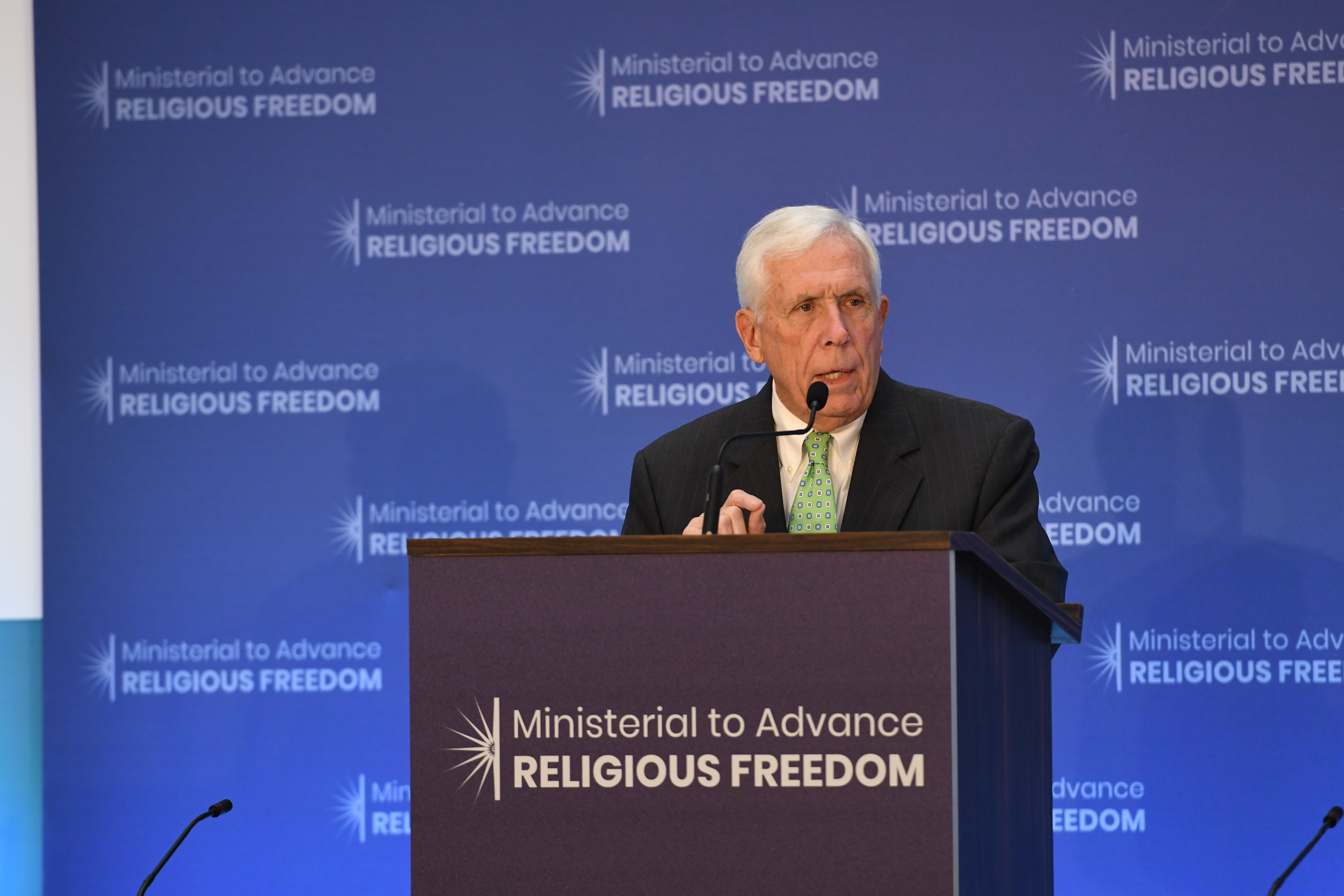
Wolf gives remarks during the Ministerial to Advance Religious Freedom at the U.S. Department of State in 2018

In the 1980 House election, when Ronald Reagan's decisive victory in the presidential election brought with it a 34-seat swing in the House, Wolf's third run proved to be successful; he won the Republican primary with 75% of the vote and then defeated Fisher in a rematch, 51%–49%. In the 1982 midterms, Wolf won re-election with 53% of the vote. He would never face another contest anywhere near that close.

Wolf did not face a Democratic opponent in 1994 and 2000, winning both with over 80% of the votes against third-party candidates. After 1982, his closest races were in the Democratic wave elections of 2006 and 2008. On both occasions he defeated professor Judy Feder, by 57%–41% and 59%–39%, respectively. Those were the only occasions after 1982 that he received below 60 percent of the vote.

In the 2012 election, as Republican presidential nominee Mitt Romney carried the district by 1%, Wolf was re-elected by 20%. In September 2013, it was announced that Wolf was to be challenged in the 2014 election by Democrat Richard Bolger, a Fairfax attorney and small business owner. In December 2013, Wolf announced his intention to retire from politics, leaving office in January 2015 – just days before his 76th birthday. He was succeeded by his former aide, Republican State Delegate Barbara Comstock.

Wolf's district was significantly redrawn several times during his 34 years in office. For his first six terms, he represented a compact Northern Virginia-based district covering Fairfax, Arlington, and Loudoun Counties. The 1990 redistricting by a Democratic Virginia General Assembly drew heavily Democratic Arlington County into the neighboring 8th District, while drawing the more Democratic portions of Fairfax County into the new 11th district. To make up for the loss of population, the 10th was pushed to the west and south to encompass parts of the congressional district held by U.S. Rep. George Allen, which was eliminated to create a black-majority district in accordance with the Voting Rights Act. Allen chose not to challenge Wolf, instead running for Governor of Virginia in 1993. The district kept approximately the same composition after the 2000 apportionment by a Republican Virginia General Assembly, but lost territory in the outlying areas of the district to allow for population growth in Fairfax and Loudoun. In 2013, the Fairfax portion of the district held about 40 percent of the population, Loudoun County held 30 percent, and the remainder of the district at 30 percent.

During his final three terms, Wolf was the only Republican representing a district based in the Washington suburbs on either side of the Potomac River. The neighboring 11th district was taken by Democrat Gerry Connolly in 2008, while the last Republican representing a district on the Maryland side, Connie Morella, had been defeated in 2002.

=== Family and Relatives ===
In 2022 Wolf's grandson, Caleb Max, ran for his seat in the Republican Firehouse Primary for Virginia's then redistricted 10th Congressional District. Max was eliminated in round 8 of the ranked choice ballet counting which included 11 candidates total.

=== Tenure ===
Wolf was especially prominent in three areas: transportation, human rights, and gambling. Before he retired, he was the co-chair of the US Congress Tom Lantos Human Rights Commission, formerly the Human Rights Caucus.

In 2010, the NRA Political Victory Fund gave him a B+ and the American Civil Liberties Union gave him 13%, dropping to 0% in 2011. His pre-2009 ranking from the United States Border Control was 92%.

==== Human rights ====
Wolf traveled five times to the Sudan, advocating for relief of the Darfur genocide. He has also convened conferences in his district to address human rights issues around the world.

After Iran tried the leadership of the Baháʼí Faith of Iran on February 11, 2009, Wolf voiced his deep concern over the "systematic persecution" of the Baháʼís. On February 13, Wolf offered a resolution on the subject of the Iranian trial, co-sponsored by seven other Congressmen, in H. RES. 175 – "Condemning the Government of Iran for its state-sponsored persecution of its Baháʼí minority and its continued violation of the International Covenants on Human Rights"; the resolution was referred to the Committee on Foreign Affairs. The situation in Iran received international attention, including defense of Iranian Nobel Laureate attorney Shirin Ebadi in June, after she received threats in April warning her against making speeches abroad, including her defending Iran's minority Baháʼí community.

On February 28, 2014, along with the Democrat Jackie Speier, Wolf became the co-chair of the Ahmadiyya Muslim Caucus, a group created in response to the ongoing persecution of Ahmadis. On May 9, 2014, Wolf introduced the United States Commission on International Religious Freedom Reauthorization Act of 2014 (H.R. 4653; 113th Congress), a bill that would amend the International Religious Freedom Act of 1998 to reauthorize the U.S. Commission on International Religious Freedom (USCIRF) as an independent federal government advisory body through FY2019.

==== China ====
Wolf has criticized the human rights record of China. He was one of the leading congressmen trying to stop the grant of permanent Most Favored Nation (MFN) status to China in 1999. When Wolf and Congressman Chris Smith were in Beijing shortly before the 2008 Summer Olympics, the Chinese security service prevented them from participating in a dinner meeting with local human rights lawyers.

In the 2011 United States federal budget, Wolf inserted a clause prohibiting NASA and the White House Office of Science and Technology Policy from any joint scientific activity with China for the remainder of the 2011 fiscal year. Wolf remarked, "We don't want to give them the opportunity to take advantage of our technology, and we have nothing to gain from dealing with them. And frankly, it boils down to a moral issue. ... Would you have a bilateral program with Stalin?"

In June 2014, Wolf got House support for an amendment that would rename the street on which the Chinese embassy was located; the amendment would change International Place to Liu Xiaobo Plaza, in honor of Chinese dissident Liu Xiaobo.

==== Iraq War ====
During the Bush administration, Wolf voted consistently with the President's positions. He voted in favor of military action in Iraq in 2002. He also voted to make the Patriot Act permanent, opposed requiring Foreign Intelligence Surveillance Act warrants for wiretaps within the United States, and supported the president in restricting congressional oversight of CIA interrogations.

However, in March 2006, Congress, at Wolf's suggestion, inserted an earmark into a supplemental appropriation bill and, in a breach with the Bush administration, announced the creation of the Iraq Study Group to reassess the U.S. strategy in Iraq.

==== Social issues ====
Wolf opposes abortion and subsidized birth control for federal employees. As congressman, Wolf also voted to deny funding to Planned Parenthood. He also opposes U.S. funding for international family planning in developing countries. Wolf was one of several Congressmen who spoke against the Uganda anti-gay bill in 2010. He signed a letter supporting the "one man one woman" issue in the Manhattan Declaration. Wolf sponsored the bill that became the District of Columbia Civil Contempt Imprisonment Limitation Act, H.R. 2136, in 1989 and supported the bill that became the Elizabeth Morgan Act in 1996.

==== Gambling ====
A 2005 Washington Post article cited "opposition to the spread of gambling" as one of Wolf's "central causes". Wolf sought to revise the regulation process for gambling on Native American reservations.

=== Committee assignments ===
- Committee on Appropriations
  - Subcommittee on Commerce, Justice, Science, and Related Agencies (chairman)
  - Subcommittee on Transportation, Housing and Urban Development, and Related Agencies

=== Caucus memberships ===
- Tom Lantos Human Rights Commission (Co-chair)
- International Conservation Caucus
- Sportsmen's Caucus

In the 109th Congress, Wolf was chairman of Subcommittee on Foreign Operations, Export Financing, and Related Programs, and its ranking minority member in the 110th. He was co-chairman of the Congressional Human Rights Caucus with Jim McGovern, who replaced the late Tom Lantos. Wolf is a member of the Moderate Republican Main Street Partnership.

== Electoral history ==
Virginia's 10th congressional district: Results 1978–2012
Year	Republican	Votes	Pct	Democratic	Votes	Pct	3rd Party	Party	Votes	Pct	3rd Party	Party	Votes	Pct
1978	Frank Wolf	61,981	47%	Joseph Fisher	70,892	53%								
1980	Frank Wolf	110,840	51%	Joseph Fisher	105,883	49%								
1982	Frank Wolf	86,506	53%	Ira Lechner	75,361	46%	Scott Bowden	Independent	2,162	1%				
1984	Frank Wolf	158,528	63%	John Flannery	95,074	37%								
1986	Frank Wolf	95,724	60%	John Milliken	63,292	40%								
1988	Frank Wolf	188,550	68%	Robert Weinberg	88,284	32%								
1990	Frank Wolf	103,761	61%	N. MacKenzie Canter	57,249	34%	Barbara Minnich	Independent	5,273	3%	Lyndon LaRouche	Independent	2,293	1%
1992	Frank Wolf	144,471	64%	Ray Vickery	75,775	33%	Alan Ogden	Independent	6,874	3%				
1994	Frank Wolf	153,311	87%	(no candidate)			Bob Rilee	Libertarian	8,267	5%	Alan Ogden	Independent	13,687	8%
1996	Frank Wolf	169,266	72%	Robert Weinberg	59,145	25%	Gary Reams	Libertarian	59,145	3%				
1998	Frank Wolf	103,648	72%	Cornell Brooks	36,476	25%	Robert Barnett	Independent	4,506	3%				
2000	Frank Wolf	238,817	84%	(no candidate)			Brian Brown	Libertarian	28,107	10%	Marc Rossi	Independent	3,226	6%
2002	Frank Wolf	115,917	72%	John Stevens	45,464	28%								
2004	Frank Wolf	205,982	64%	James Socas	116,654	36%								
2006	Frank Wolf	138,213	57%	Judy Feder	98,769	41%	Wilbur Wood	Libertarian	2,107	1%	Neeraj Nigam	Independent	1,851	1%
2008	Frank Wolf	223,140	59%	Judy Feder	147,357	39%	Neeraj Nigam	Independent	8,457	2%				
2010	Frank Wolf	131,116	63%	Jeff Barnett	72,604	35%	William Redpath	Libertarian	4,607	2%				
2012	Frank Wolf	214,038	58%	Kristin Cabral	142,024	39%	J. Kevin Chisholm	Independent	9,855	3%				

U.S. House of Representatives
Preceded by Joe Fisher	Member of the U.S. House of Representatives from Virginia's 10th congressional district 1981–2015	Succeeded by Barbara Comstock
Preceded by John Porter	Chair of the House Human Rights Commission; 2001–2007	Succeeded by Tom Lantos
Preceded by Tom Lantos	Ranking Member of the House Human Rights Commission; 2007–2011	Succeeded by Jim McGovern
Preceded by Jim McGovern	Chair of the House Human Rights Commission; 2011–2015	Succeeded by Joe Pitts
U.S. order of precedence (ceremonial)
Preceded by Norm Dicks as Former U.S. Representative	Order of precedence of the United States as Former U.S. Representative	Succeeded by David Price as Former U.S. Representative
