= United States Commission on International Religious Freedom Reauthorization Act of 2014 =

- Long title: To reauthorize the United States Commission on International Religious Freedom, and for other purposes.
- Announced in: the 113th United States Congress
- Sponsored by: Rep. Frank R. Wolf (R, VA-10)
- Number of co-sponsors: 0

Codification
- U.S.C. sections affected: 22 U.S.C. § 6431, 22 U.S.C. § 6432b, 22 U.S.C. § 6435, 22 U.S.C. § 4028, 22 U.S.C. § 6436, and others.
- Agencies affected: United States Commission on International Religious Freedom, United States Department of State
- Authorizations of appropriations: $3,000,000 for each of fiscal years 2015, 2016, 2017, 2018 and 2019, for a total of $15,000,000 over five years

Legislative history
- Introduced in the House as H.R. 4653 by Rep. Frank R. Wolf (R, VA-10) on May 9, 2014; Committee consideration by United States House Committee on Foreign Affairs, United States House Foreign Affairs Subcommittee on Africa, Global Health, Global Human Rights and International Organizations

The United States Commission on International Religious Freedom Reauthorization Act of 2014 (H.R. 4653) is a bill that would amend the International Religious Freedom Act of 1998 to reauthorize the U.S. Commission on International Religious Freedom (USCIRF) as an independent federal government advisory body through FY2019.

The bill was introduced into the United States House of Representatives during the 113th United States Congress.

== Background ==
The USCIRF defines itself as "an independent, bipartisan U.S. federal government commission, the first of its kind in the world, dedicated to defending the universal right to freedom of religion or belief abroad. USCIRF reviews the facts and circumstances of religious freedom violations and makes policy recommendations to the President, the Secretary of State, and Congress." Commissioners are selected by the President and the leadership of both chambers of Congress.

== Provisions of the bill ==
This summary is based largely on the summary provided by the Congressional Research Service, a public domain source.

The United States Commission on International Religious Freedom Reauthorization Act of 2014 would amend the International Religious Freedom Act of 1998 to reauthorize the U.S. Commission on International Religious Freedom (USCIRF) as an independent federal government advisory body through FY2019.

The bill would remove authority under which a USCIRF member may serve after the expiration of that member's term until a successor has taken office.

The bill would amend the Foreign Service Act of 1980 to require the United States Secretary of State to receive assistance from USCIRF when establishing training for Foreign Service Officers in the field of internationally recognized human rights, including instruction regarding the relationship between religious freedom and security, as well as the role of religious freedom in U.S. foreign policy.

The bill would encourage the United States Department of State to allow classified information to be accessed by USCIRF Commissioners and staff with the appropriate security clearance.

The bill would revise restrictions on USCIRF's acceptance of gifts and donations to permit sponsoring private parties to provide compensation and benefits to interns, fellows, and volunteers.

== Congressional Budget Office report ==
This summary is based largely on the summary provided by the Congressional Budget Office, as ordered reported by the House Committee on Foreign Affairs on June 26, 2014. This is a public domain source.

H.R. 4653 would extend the authorities of the United States Commission on International Religious Freedom by five years, through 2019. It also would authorize the appropriation of $3 million to the commission each year over that five-year period.

Assuming appropriation of the specified amounts, the Congressional Budget Office (CBO) estimates that implementing the bill would cost $15 million over the 2015-2019 period. Section 3 would require that Foreign Service officers receive additional training on religious freedom; CBO estimates that implementing that training would have insignificant costs.

== Procedural history ==
The United States Commission on International Religious Freedom Reauthorization Act of 2014 was introduced into the United States House of Representatives on May 9, 2014, by Rep. Frank R. Wolf (R, VA-10). The bill was referred to the United States House Committee on Foreign Affairs and the United States House Foreign Affairs Subcommittee on Africa, Global Health, Global Human Rights and International Organizations. The House Foreign Affairs Committee passed the bill on June 26, 2014.

== Debate and discussion ==
Supporters of the reauthorization of the USCIRF, such as Alan J. Reinach, argued that it should be reauthorized because "religious freedom is first both in our Constitution and in our hierarchy of values, because without respect for the freedom to order one's life according to the things held to be sacred, one loses an essential part of what makes a person human." Reinach also argued that "if Americans stop caring, the tyrants of the world will get the signal that it is open season on religious dissidents" leading to their deaths, so the USCIRF should be reauthorized to prevent this. Supporter Lincoln E. Steed agreed that the USCIRF should be reauthorized, but criticized the organization as being one that "can as easily provide cover for inaction as spur official policy."

== See also ==
- List of bills in the 113th United States Congress
- Freedom of religion in the United States
