= 2004 United States House of Representatives elections in Virginia =

- November 2, 2004

All 11 Virginia seats to the United States House of Representatives
	Majority party	Minority party
Party	Republican	Democratic
Last election	8 seats, 66.45%	3 seats, 29.05%
Seats before	8	3
Seats won	8	3
Seat change	Steady	Steady
Popular vote	1,817,422	1,023,187
Percentage	60.50%	34.06%
Swing	▼5.95%	▲5.01%

Republican
40–50%
50–60%
60–70%
70–80%
80–90%
90–100%
Democratic
40–50%
50–60%
60–70%
70–80%

The 2004 United States House of Representatives elections in Virginia were held on November 2, 2004 to determine who will represent the Commonwealth of Virginia in the United States House of Representatives. Virginia has eleven seats in the House, apportioned according to the 2000 United States census. Representatives are elected for two-year terms.

== Overview ==
=== Statewide ===
Party	Candidates	Votes		Seats		
Party	Candidates	No.	%	No.	+/–	%
Republican	11	1,817,422	60.50	8	Steady	71.43
Democratic	8	1,023,187	34.06	3	Steady	28.57
Independent Greens	5	149,442	4.97	0	Steady	0.0
Write-in	11	13,956	0.46	0	Steady	0.0
Total	35	3,004,007	100.0	11	Steady	100.0

Popular vote
Republican	60.50%
Democratic	34.06%
Independents	4.97%
Other	0.46%

House seats
Republican	72.73%
Democratic	27.27%

=== By district ===
Results of the 2004 United States House of Representatives elections in Virginia by district:

District	Republican		Democratic		Others		Total		Result
District	Votes	%	Votes	%	Votes	%	Votes	%	Result
District 1	225,071	78.55%	0	0.00%	61,463	21.45%	286,534	100.0%	Republican hold
District 2	132,946	55.08%	108,180	44.82%	254	0.11%	241,380	100.0%	Republican hold
District 3	70,194	30.53%	159,373	69.33%	325	0.14%	229,892	100.0%	Democratic hold
District 4	182,444	64.46%	100,413	35.48%	170	0.06%	283,027	100.0%	Republican hold
District 5	172,431	63.68%	98,237	36.28%	90	0.03%	270,758	100.0%	Republican hold
District 6	206,560	96.68%	0	0.00%	7,088	3.32%	213,648	100.0%	Republican hold
District 7	230,765	75.50%	0	0.00%	74,893	24.50%	305,658	100.0%	Republican hold
District 8	106,231	36.90%	171,986	59.73%	9,702	3.37%	287,919	100.0%	Democratic hold
District 9	98,499	38.94%	150,039	59.32%	4,409	1.74%	252,947	100.0%	Democratic hold
District 10	205,982	63.77%	116,654	36.11%	375	0.12%	323,011	100.0%	Republican hold
District 11	186,299	60.25%	118,305	38.26%	4,629	1.50%	309,233	100.0%	Republican hold
Total	1,817,422	60.50%	1,023,187	34.06%	163,398	5.44%	3,004,007	100.0%	

== District 1 ==
2004 Virginia's 1st congressional district election
- November 2, 2004
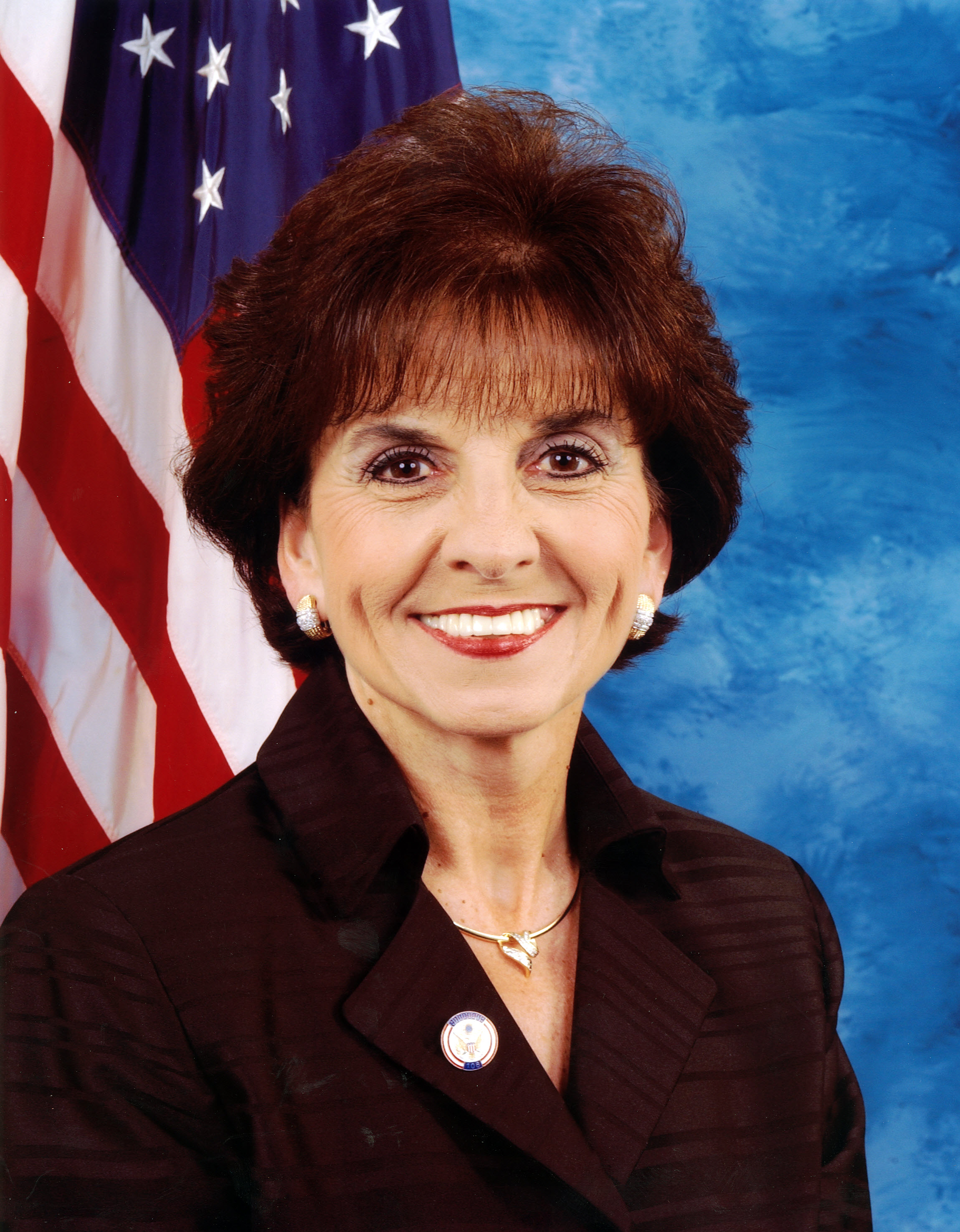

Nominee	Jo Ann Davis	William Lee
Party	Republican	Independent Greens
Popular vote	225,071	57,434
Percentage	78.54%	20.04%
- County and independent city results Davis: 60–70% 70–80% 80–90%
U.S. Representative before election
Jo Ann Davis
Republican
Elected U.S. Representative
Jo Ann Davis
Republican

Incumbent Republican Jo Ann Davis, who had represented the district since 2001, ran for re-election. She was re-elected with 95.9% of the vote in 2002.

=== Republican primary ===
==== Candidates ====
===== Nominee =====
- Jo Ann Davis, incumbent U.S. Representative

=== Democratic primary ===
No Democrats filed to run.

=== Independent Greens primary ===
==== Candidates ====
===== Nominee =====
- William Lee

=== General election ===
==== Predictions ====
Source	Ranking	As of
The Cook Political Report	Safe R	October 29, 2004
Sabato's Crystal Ball	Safe R	November 1, 2004

==== Results ====
Virginia's 1st congressional district election, 2004
Party	Candidate	Votes	%
Republican	Jo Ann Davis (incumbent)	225,071	78.5
Independent Greens	William Lee	57,434	20.0
Write-in		4,029	1.4
Majority		167,637	58.5
Total votes		286,534	100.0
Republican hold			

== District 2 ==
2004 Virginia's 2nd congressional district election
- November 2, 2004
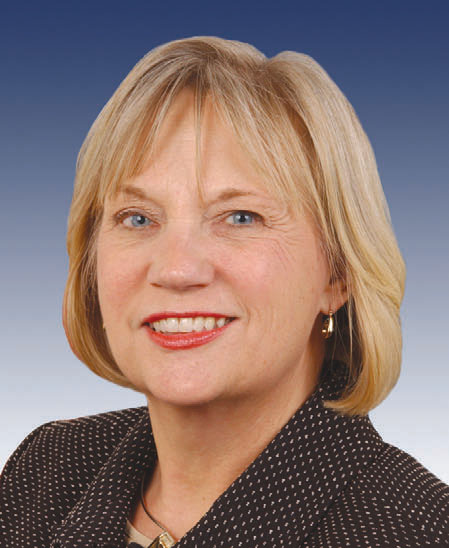

Nominee	Thelma Drake	David Ashe
Party	Republican	Democratic
Popular vote	132,946	108,180
Percentage	55.07%	44.81%
- County and independent city results Drake: 50–60% Ashe: 50–60%
U.S. Representative before election
Ed Schrock
Republican
Elected U.S. Representative
Thelma Drake
Republican

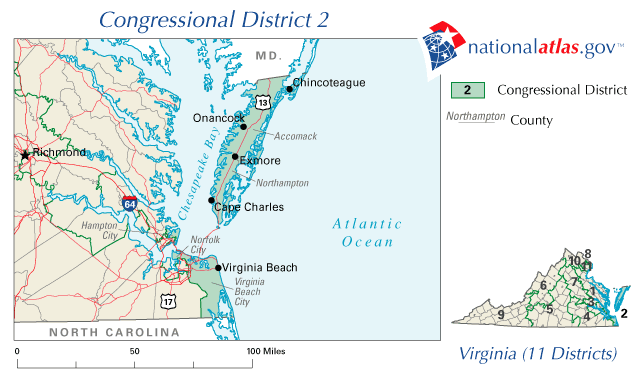

Incumbent Republican Ed Schrock, who had represented the district since 2001, declined to run for re-election. He was re-elected with 83.1% of the vote in 2002.

=== Republican primary ===
Despite having been renominated, Schrock announced on August 30, that he would no longer seek a third term in Congress. This followed Michael Rogers's blogACTIVE.com claiming that the married Schrock was gay — or at least bisexual — despite having aggressively opposed various gay-rights issues in Congress, such as same-sex marriage and gays serving in the military.

==== Candidates ====
===== Nominee =====
- Thelma Drake, state delegate

===== Eliminated in primary =====
- Paul Lanteigne, Virginia Beach Sheriff
- Nick Rerras, state senator

===== Withdrawn =====
- Ed Schrock, incumbent U.S. Representative

===== Declined =====
- Ken Stolle, state senator
- Frank Wagner, state senator

=== Democratic primary ===
==== Candidates ====
===== Nominee =====
- David Ashe, attorney and Marine reservist

=== General election ===
==== Endorsements ====
Thelma Drake (R)

Organizations

- Club for Growth
David Ashe (D)

U.S. representatives

- Owen B. Pickett, U.S. representative from Virginia's 2nd congressional district (1987–2001)

==== Predictions ====
Source	Ranking	As of
The Cook Political Report	Lean R	October 29, 2004
Sabato's Crystal Ball	Safe R	November 1, 2004

==== Results ====
Virginia's 2nd congressional district election, 2004
Party	Candidate	Votes	%
Republican	Thelma Drake	132,946	55.1
Democratic	David Ashe	108,180	44.8
Write-in		254	0.1
Majority		24,766	10.3
Total votes		241,380	100.0
Republican hold			

== District 3 ==
2004 Virginia's 3rd congressional district election
- November 2, 2004
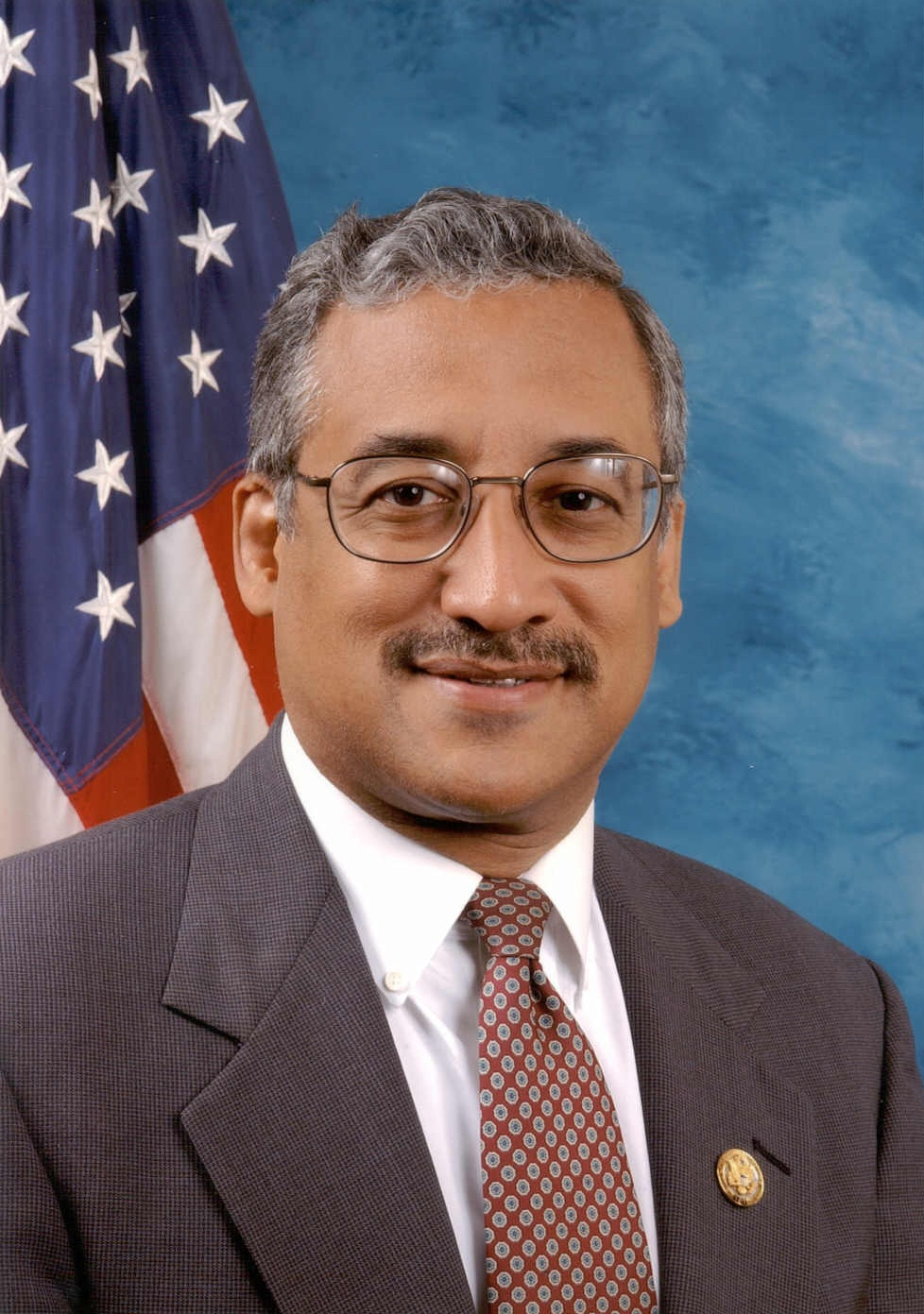

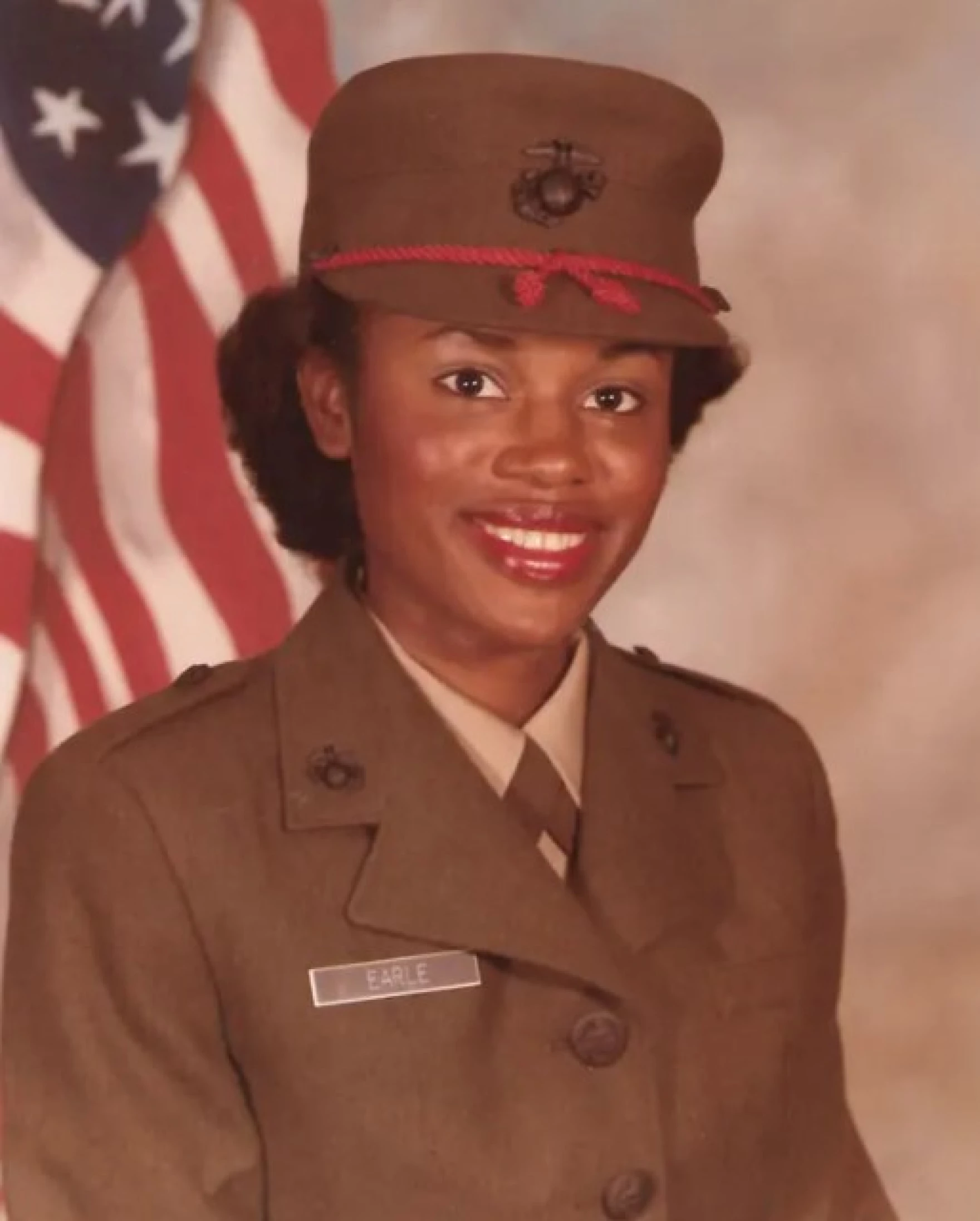
Nominee	Bobby Scott	Winsome Earle-Sears
Party	Democratic	Republican
Popular vote	159,373	70,194
Percentage	69.32%	30.53%
- County results Scott: 60–70% 70–80% 80–90% Sears: 50–60%
U.S. Representative before election
Bobby Scott
Democratic
Elected U.S. Representative
Bobby Scott
Democratic

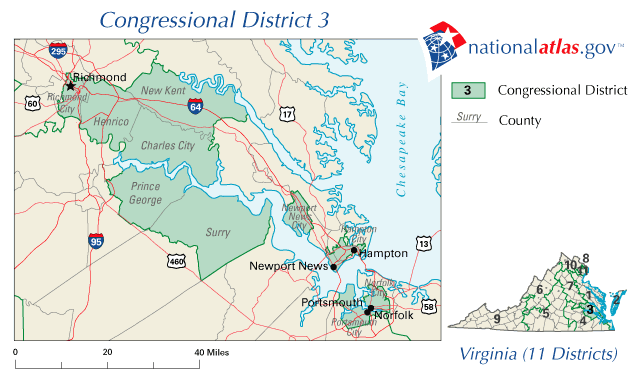

Incumbent Democrat Bobby Scott, who had represented the district since 1993, ran for re-election. He was re-elected with 96.1% of the vote in 2002.

=== Democratic primary ===
==== Candidates ====
===== Nominee =====
- Bobby Scott, incumbent U.S. Representative

=== Republican primary ===
==== Candidates ====
===== Nominee =====
- Winsome Earle-Sears, former state delegate

=== General election ===
==== Predictions ====
Source	Ranking	As of
The Cook Political Report	Safe D	October 29, 2004
Sabato's Crystal Ball	Safe D	November 1, 2004

==== Results ====
Virginia's 3rd congressional district election, 2004
Party	Candidate	Votes	%
Democratic	Bobby Scott (incumbent)	159,373	69.3
Republican	Winsome Earle-Sears	70,194	30.5
Write-in		325	0.1
Majority		89,179	38.8
Total votes		229,892	100.0
Democratic hold			

== District 4 ==
2004 Virginia's 4th congressional district election
- November 2, 2004
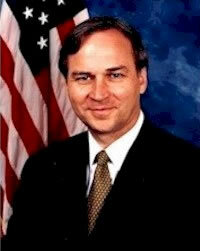

Nominee	Randy Forbes	Jonathan Menefee
Party	Republican	Democratic
Popular vote	182,444	100,413
Percentage	64.46%	35.47%
- County and independent city results Forbes: 50–60% 60–70% 70–80% 80–90% Menefee: 70–80%
U.S. Representative before election
Randy Forbes
Republican
Elected U.S. Representative
Randy Forbes
Republican

Incumbent Republican Randy Forbes, who had represented the district since 2001, ran for re-election. He was re-elected with 97.9% of the vote in 2002.

=== Republican primary ===
==== Candidates ====
===== Nominee =====
- Randy Forbes, incumbent U.S. Representative

=== Democratic primary ===
==== Candidates ====
===== Nominee =====
- Jonathan Menefee, HR director and former field organizer for John Edwards' presidential campaign.

=== General election ===
==== Predictions ====
Source	Ranking	As of
The Cook Political Report	Safe R	October 29, 2004
Sabato's Crystal Ball	Safe R	November 1, 2004

==== Results ====
Virginia's 4th congressional district election, 2004
Party	Candidate	Votes	%
Republican	Randy Forbes (incumbent)	182,444	64.5
Democratic	Jonathan Menefee	100,413	35.5
Write-in		170	0.1
Majority		82,031	29.0
Total votes		283,027	100.0
Republican hold			

== District 5 ==
2004 Virginia's 5th congressional district election
- November 2, 2004
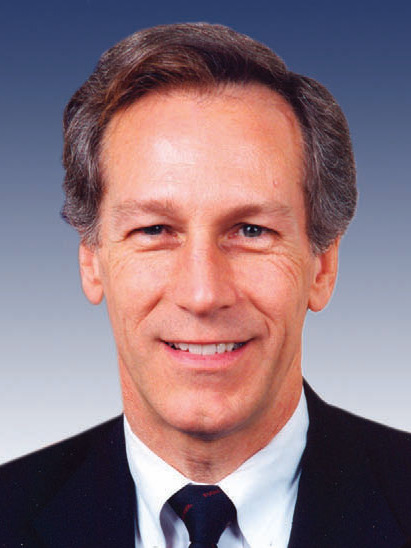

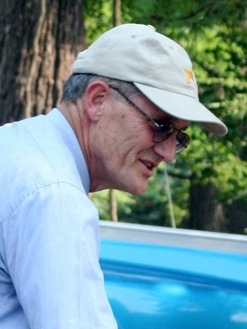
	Majority party	Minority party
Candidate	Virgil Goode	Al Weed
Party	Republican	Democratic
Popular vote	172,431	98,237
Percentage	63.68%	36.28%
- County and independent city results Goode: 50–60% 60–70% 70–80% Weed: 70–80%
U.S. Representative before election
Virgil Goode
Republican
Elected U.S. Representative
Virgil Goode
Republican

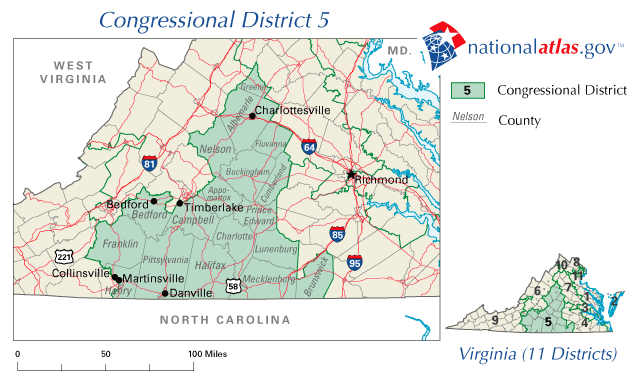

Incumbent Republican Virgil Goode, who had represented the district since 1997, ran for re-election. He was re-elected with 63.7% of the vote in 2002.

=== Republican primary ===
==== Candidates ====
===== Nominee =====
- Virgil Goode, incumbent U.S. Representative

=== Democratic primary ===
==== Candidates ====
===== Nominee =====
- Al Weed, orchardist and retired Green Beret

=== General election ===
==== Predictions ====
Source	Ranking	As of
The Cook Political Report	Safe R	October 29, 2004
Sabato's Crystal Ball	Safe R	November 1, 2004

==== Results ====
Virginia's 5th congressional district election, 2004
Party	Candidate	Votes	%
Republican	Virgil Goode (incumbent)	172,431	63.7
Democratic	Al Weed	98,237	36.3
Write-in		90	0.0
Majority		74,194	27.4
Total votes		270,758	100.0
Republican hold			

== District 6 ==
2004 Virginia's 6th congressional district election
- November 2, 2004
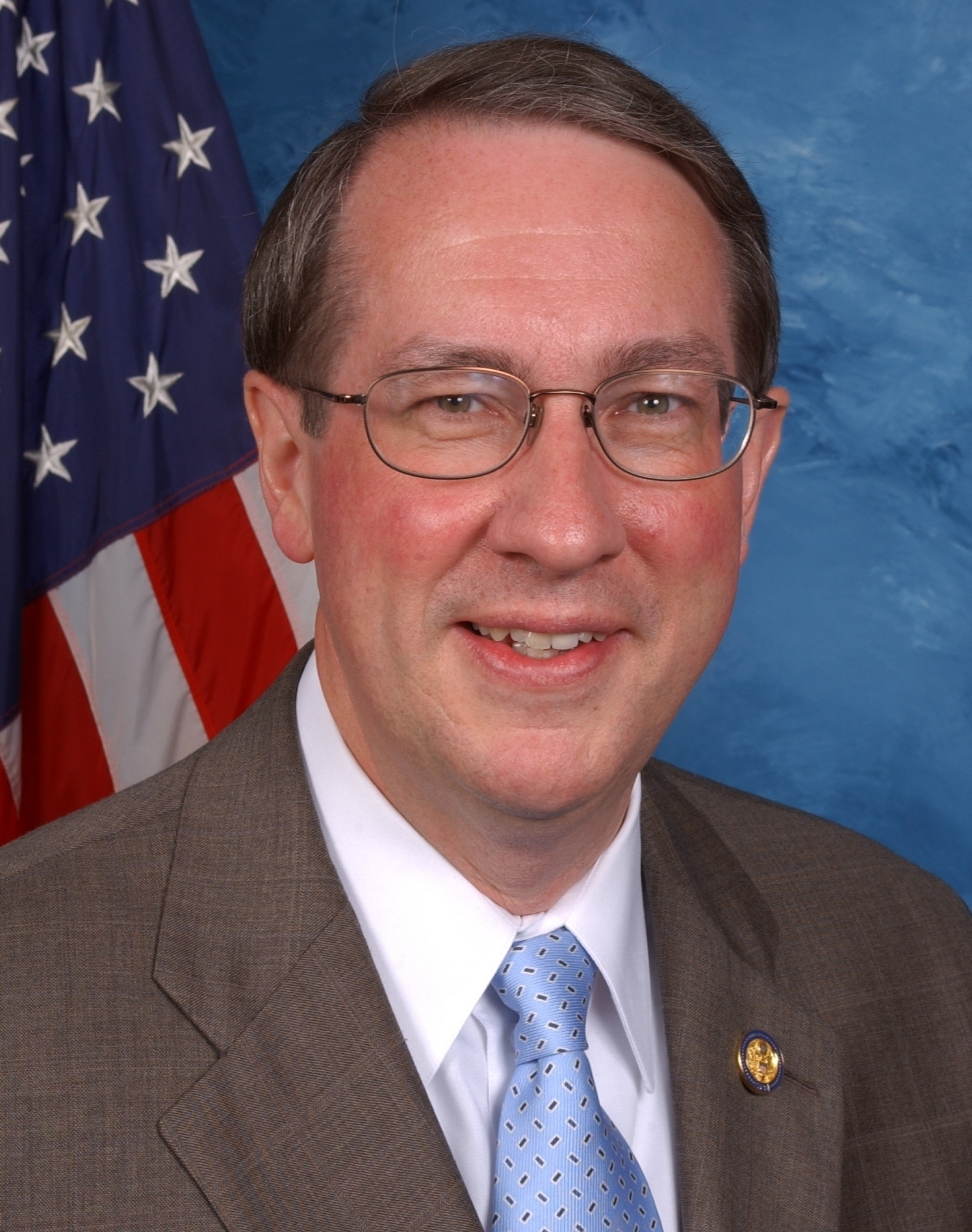
Nominee	Bob Goodlatte
Party	Republican
Popular vote	206,560
Percentage	96.68%
U.S. Representative before election
Bob Goodlatte
Republican
Elected U.S. Representative
Bob Goodlatte
Republican

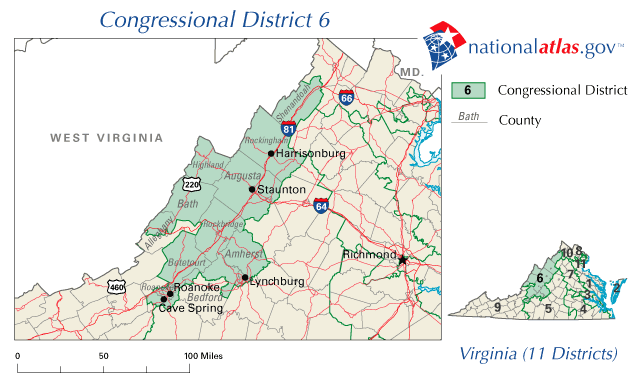

Incumbent Republican Bob Goodlatte, who had represented the district since 1993, ran for re-election. He was re-elected with 97.1% of the vote in 2002.

=== Republican primary ===
==== Candidates ====
===== Nominee =====
- Bob Goodlatte, incumbent U.S. Representative

=== Democratic primary ===
No Democrats filed to run.

=== General election ===
==== Predictions ====
Source	Ranking	As of
The Cook Political Report	Safe R	October 29, 2004
Sabato's Crystal Ball	Safe R	November 1, 2004

==== Results ====
Virginia's 6th congressional district election, 2004
Party	Candidate	Votes	%
Republican	Bob Goodlatte (incumbent)	206,560	96.7
Write-in		7,088	3.3
Majority		199,472	93.4
Total votes		213,648	100.0
Republican hold			

== District 7 ==
2004 Virginia's 7th congressional district election
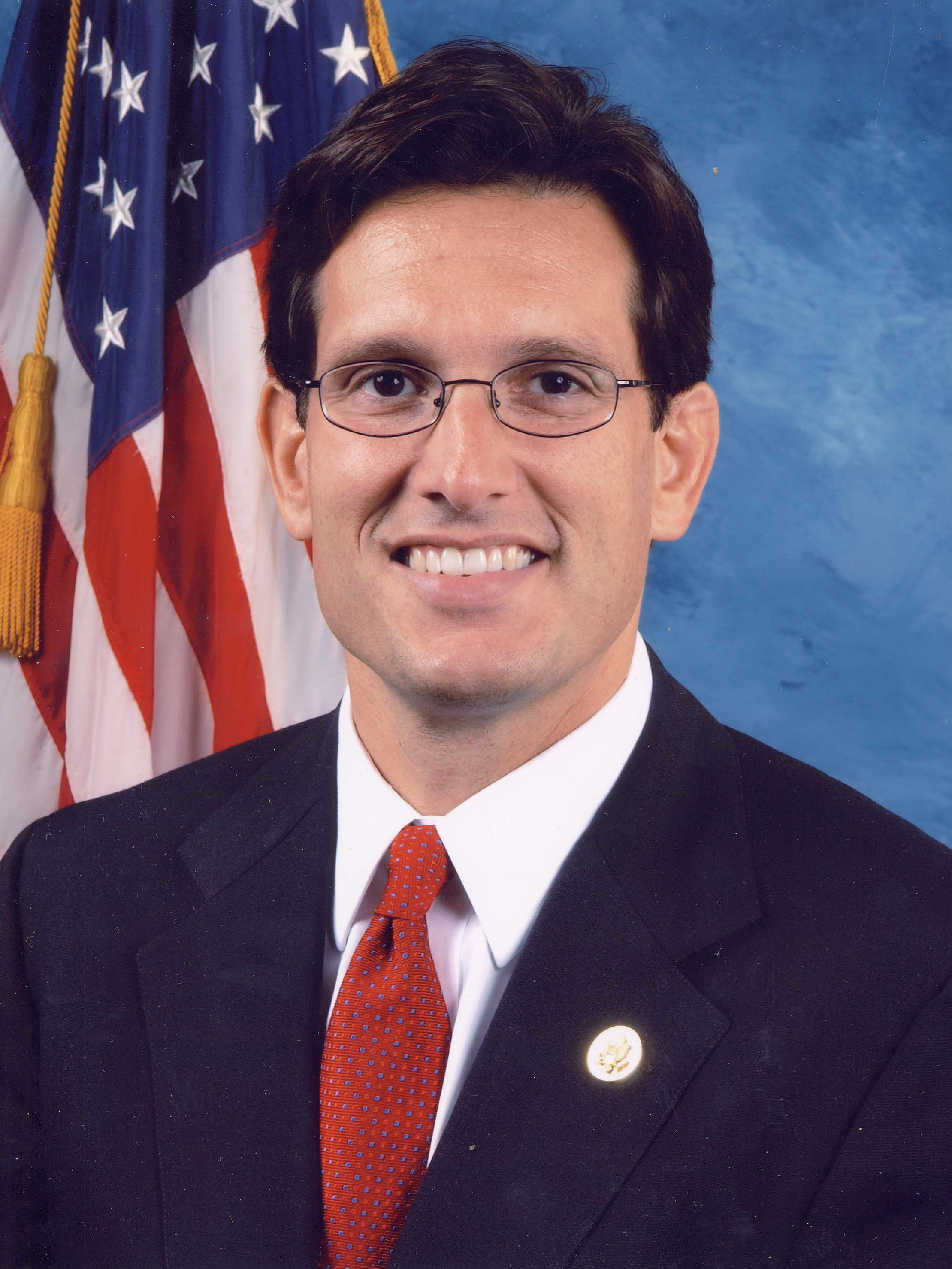

Nominee	Eric Cantor	Brad Blanton
Party	Republican	Independent Greens
Popular vote	230,765	74,325
Percentage	75.5%	24.3%
- County results Cantor: 60–70% 70–80% 80–90%
U.S. Representative before election
Eric Cantor
Republican
Elected U.S. Representative
Eric Cantor
Republican

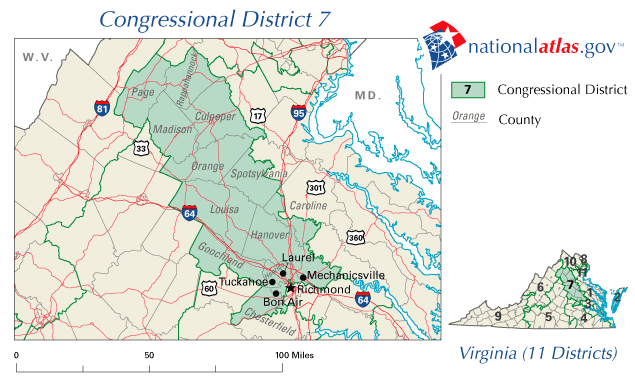

Incumbent Republican Eric Cantor, who had represented the district since 2001, ran for re-election. He was re–elected with 69.4% of the vote in 2002.

=== Republican primary ===
==== Candidates ====
===== Nominee =====
- Eric Cantor, incumbent U.S. Representative

=== Independent Greens primary ===
==== Candidates ====
===== Nominee =====
- Brad Blanton, psychotherapist and author

=== General election ===
==== Predictions ====
Source	Ranking	As of
The Cook Political Report	Safe R	October 29, 2004
Sabato's Crystal Ball	Safe R	November 1, 2004

==== Results ====
Virginia's 7th congressional district election, 2004
Party	Candidate	Votes	%
Republican	Eric Cantor (incumbent)	230,765	75.5
Independent Greens	Brad Blanton	74,325	24.3
Write-in		568	0.2
Majority		156,440	51.2
Total votes		305,658	100.0
Republican hold			

== District 8 ==
2004 Virginia's 8th congressional district election
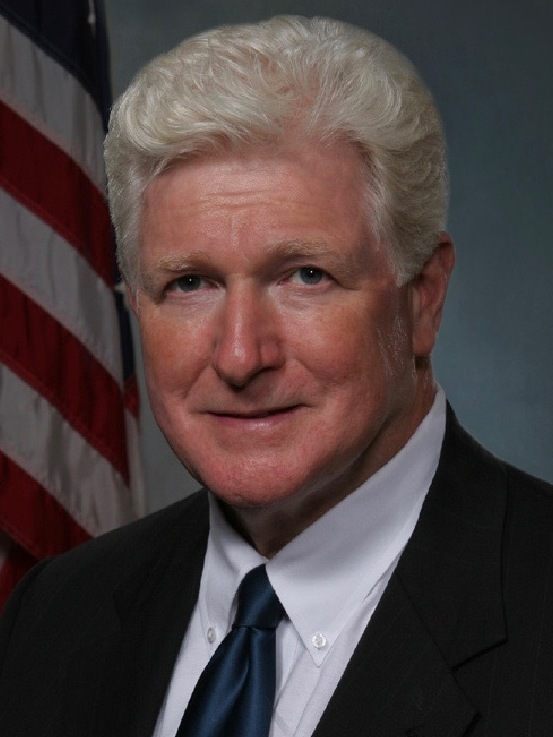

Nominee	Jim Moran	Lisa Marie Cheney
Party	Democratic	Republican
Popular vote	171,986	106,231
Percentage	59.7%	36.9%
- County and independent city results Moran: 50–60% 60–70%
U.S. Representative before election
Jim Moran
Democratic
Elected U.S. Representative
Jim Moran
Democratic

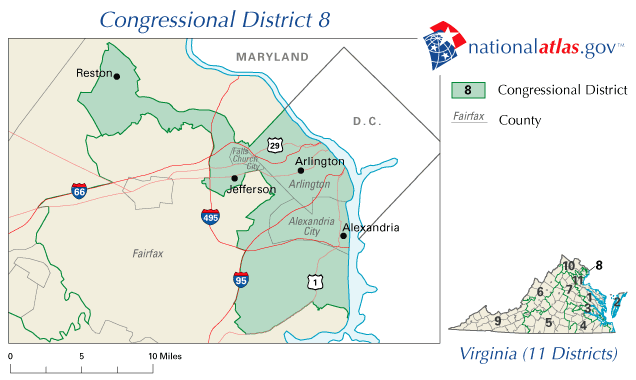

Incumbent Democrat Jim Moran, who had represented the district since 1985, ran for re-election. He was re-elected with 59.8% of the vote in 2002.

=== Democratic primary ===
After he received criticism for comments suggesting that American Jews were responsible for pushing the country to war with Iraq and that Jewish leaders could prevent war if they wanted to, Moran faced opposition in the Democratic primary.

==== Candidates ====
===== Nominee =====
- Jim Moran, incumbent U.S. Representative

===== Eliminated in primary =====
- Andrew Rosenberg, attorney

===== Withdrawn =====
- Jay Fisette, Chair of the Arlington County Board
- Katherine Hanley, Fairfax County Board of Supervisors chair and candidate for Lieutenant Governor in 2001

===== Declined =====
- Jeremy Bash, attorney
- Leslie Byrne, state senator and former U.S. Representative

==== Results ====
Democratic primary results
Party	Candidate	Votes	%
Democratic	Jim Moran (incumbent)	24,121	58.6
Democratic	Andrew Rosenberg	17,067	41.4
Total votes		41,188	100.0

=== Republican primary ===
==== Candidates ====
===== Nominee =====
- Lisa Marie Cheney, government relations consultant (no relation to Vice President Dick Cheney)

===== Eliminated in primary =====
- Jane Eshagpoor, former aide to Governor Jim Gilmore
- Matt Mueda, paramedic and former Bush administration official
- Mike Riccardi, Capitol Police officer

===== Withdrawn =====
- Melissa Helmbrecht, entrepreneur and youth activist
- Andre Hollis, former Deputy Assistant Secretary of Defense for Counternarcotics
- Robb Rourke, house parent

===== Declined =====
- Joe McCain, actor, newspaper reporter, and brother of U.S. Senator John McCain
- Kyle E. McSlarrow, United States Deputy Secretary of Energy and nominee for this seat in 1992 and 1994

=== General election ===
==== Predictions ====
Source	Ranking	As of
The Cook Political Report	Safe D	October 29, 2004
Sabato's Crystal Ball	Safe D	November 1, 2004

==== Results ====
Virginia's 8th congressional district election, 2004
Party	Candidate	Votes	%
Democratic	Jim Moran (incumbent)	171,986	59.7
Republican	Lisa Marie Cheney	106,231	36.9
Independent Greens	Jim Hurysz	9,004	3.1
Write-in		698	0.2
Majority		65,755	22.8
Total votes		287,919	100.00
Democratic hold			

== District 9 ==
2004 Virginia's 9th congressional district election
- November 2, 2004
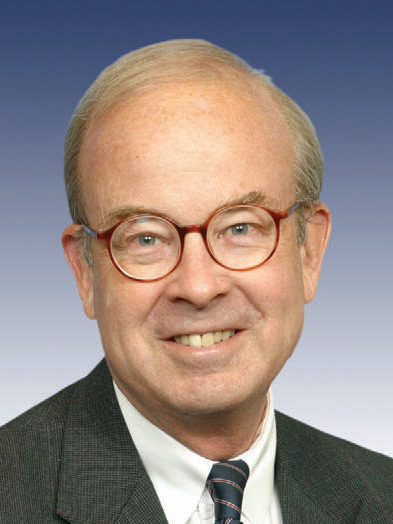

	Majority party	Minority party
Candidate	Rick Boucher	Kevin Triplett
Party	Democratic	Republican
Popular vote	150,039	98,499
Percentage	59.31%	38.94%
- Boucher: 40–50% 50–60% 60–70% 70–80% 80–90% Triplett: 40–50% 50–60% 60–70%
U.S. Representative before election
Rick Boucher
Democratic
Elected U.S. Representative
Rick Boucher
Democratic

Incumbent Democrat Rick Boucher, who had represented the district since 1983, ran for re-election. He was re-elected with 65.8% of the vote in 2002.

=== Democratic primary ===
==== Candidates ====
===== Nominee =====
- Rick Boucher, incumbent U.S. Representative

=== Republican primary ===
==== Candidates ====
===== Nominee =====
- Kevin Triplett, former managing director of business operations for NASCAR

=== General election ===
==== Predictions ====
Source	Ranking	As of
The Cook Political Report	Likely D	October 29, 2004
Sabato's Crystal Ball	Safe D	November 1, 2004

==== Results ====
Virginia's 9th congressional district election, 2004
Party	Candidate	Votes	%
Democratic	Rick Boucher (incumbent)	150,039	59.3
Republican	Kevin Triplett	98,499	38.9
Independent Greens	Seth Davis	4,341	1.7
Write-in		68	0.0
Majority		51,540	20.4
Total votes		252,947	100.00
Democratic hold			

== District 10 ==
2004 Virginia's 10th congressional district election
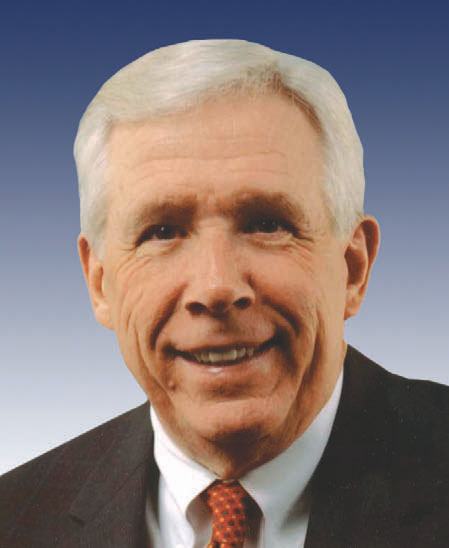

Nominee	Frank Wolf	James Socas
Party	Republican	Democratic
Popular vote	205,982	116,654
Percentage	63.8%	36.1%
- County and independent city results Wolf: 50–60% 60–70% 70–80%
U.S. Representative before election
Frank Wolf
Republican
Elected U.S. Representative
Frank Wolf
Republican

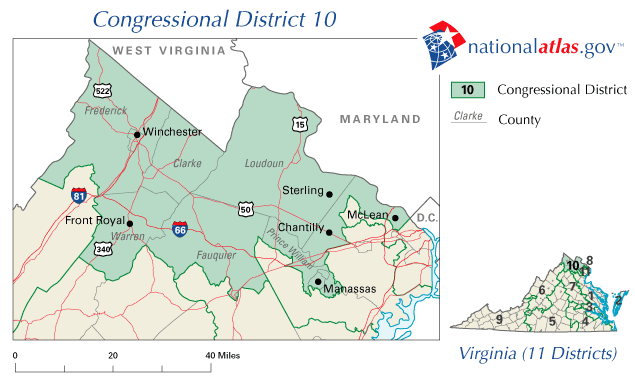

Incumbent Republican Frank Wolf, who had represented the district since 1981, ran for re-election. He was re-elected with 71.7% of the vote in 2002.

=== Republican primary ===
==== Candidates ====
===== Nominee =====
- Frank Wolf, incumbent U.S. Representative

=== Democratic primary ===
==== Candidates ====
===== Nominee =====
- James Socas, former United States Senate Committee on Banking, Housing, and Urban Affairs staffer and former Wall Street executive

=== General election ===
==== Predictions ====
Source	Ranking	As of
The Cook Political Report	Safe R	October 29, 2004
Sabato's Crystal Ball	Safe R	November 1, 2004

==== Results ====
Virginia's 10th congressional district election, 2004
Party	Candidate	Votes	%
Republican	Frank Wolf (incumbent)	205,982	63.8
Democratic	James Socas	116,654	36.1
Write-in		375	0.1
Majority		89,328	27.7
Total votes		323,011	100.0
Republican hold			

== District 11 ==
2004 Virginia's 11th congressional district election
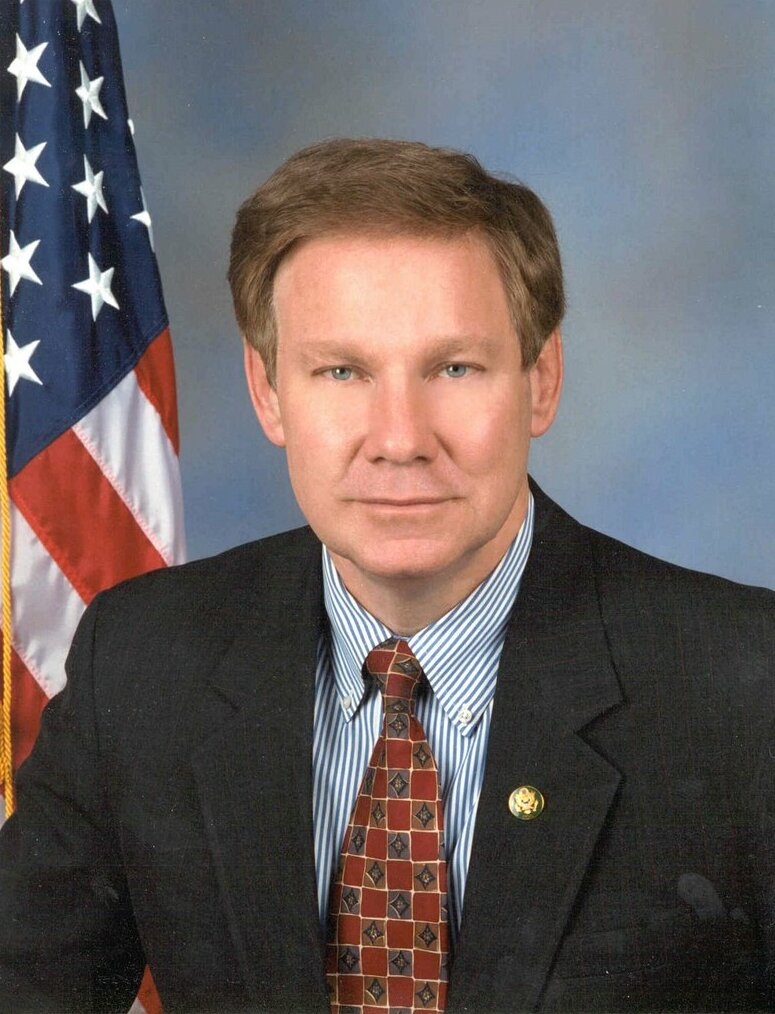

Nominee	Tom Davis	Ken Longmyer
Party	Republican	Democratic
Popular vote	186,299	118,305
Percentage	60.3%	38.3%
- County results Davis: 50–60% 60–70%
U.S. Representative before election
Tom Davis
Republican
Elected U.S. Representative
Tom Davis
Republican

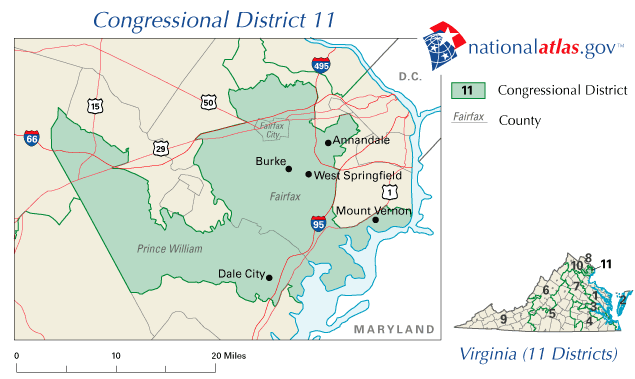

Incumbent Republican Tom Davis, who had represented the district since 1995, ran for re-election. He was re-elected with 82.9% of the vote in 2002.

=== Republican primary ===
==== Candidates ====
===== Nominee =====
- Tom Davis, incumbent U.S. Representative

=== Democratic primary ===
==== Candidates ====
===== Nominee =====
- Ken Longmyer, retired foreign service officer

=== General election ===
==== Predictions ====
Source	Ranking	As of
The Cook Political Report	Safe R	October 29, 2004
Sabato's Crystal Ball	Safe R	November 1, 2004

==== Results ====
Virginia's 11th congressional district election, 2004
Party	Candidate	Votes	%
Republican	Tom Davis (incumbent)	186,299	60.3
Democratic	Ken Longmyer	118,305	38.3
Independent Greens	Joseph Oddo	4,338	1.4
Write-in		259	0.1
Majority		67,994	22.0
Total votes		309,233	100.0
Republican hold			
