= Judy Feder =

American public policy professor

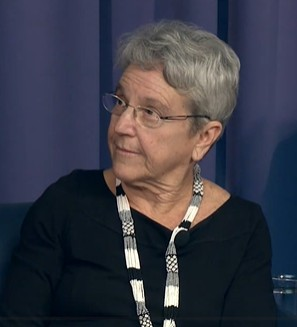

Personal details
- Born: 1946 or 1947 (age 78–79)
- Party: Democratic
- Spouse: Stan
- Education: Brandeis University (BA); Harvard University (MA, PhD)

Judith M. Feder (born 1945/1946) is a Professor of Public Policy at Georgetown University and was Dean of the Georgetown Public Policy Institute from 1999 through 2007; she is a member of the Institute of Medicine.

Feder is also a Democratic policy consultant and served in the Clinton administration. She ran unsuccessfully in 2006 and 2008 for the United States House of Representatives to represent Virginia's 10th congressional district.

== Academic career ==
Feder holds a B.A. from Brandeis University in 1968 and received her Master's in 1970 and Ph.D. in 1977 from Harvard University in political science. She held positions at the Brookings Institution and at the Urban Institute, before joining Georgetown in 1984. as Co-Director of the Center for Health Policy Studies, Georgetown University School of Medicine. After a stint in the Clinton administration, she returned to Georgetown in 1995 as Research Professor of Public Policy, becoming Dean of the Institute in 1999.

At Georgetown, she is codirector of the Georgetown University Long-term Care Financing, and senior advisor to the Kaiser Family Foundation’s Commission on Medicaid and the Uninsured.

In addition to her membership in the Institute of Medicine, she is a member of the National Academy of Public Administration and the National Academy of Social Insurance and is past-President and board member of AcademyHealth and a Policy Council Member of the Academy of Public Policy and Management.

=== Publications ===
Books

- Medicaid Financing Crisis: Balancing Responsibilities, Priorities, and Dollars, ed. (with Diane Rowland and Alina Salganicoff). Washington, D.C.: AAAS Press, 1993.
- Insuring the Nation's Health: Market Competition, Catastrophic and Comprehensive Approaches, (with Jack Hadley and John Holahan). Washington, D.C.: The Urban Institute, 1981.
- National Health Insurance: Conflicting Goals and Policy Choices, ed. (with John Holahan and Theodore Marmor). Washington, D.C.: The Urban Institute, March 1980.
- Financing Health Care for the Elderly: Medicare, Medicaid, and Private Health Insurance, (with John Holahan). Washington, D.C.: The Urban Institute, 1979.
- Medicare: The Politics of Federal Hospital Insurance, Lexington, MA: Heath, Washington, D.C. 1977.

Other publications

Feder is the author of 36 articles in peer-reviewed journals in medicine and public affairs, including several articles in JAMA and the New England Journal of Medicine, over 10 chapters in academic and books, as well as less academic political publications.

== Political career ==
Feder was staff director of the U.S. Bipartisan Commission on Comprehensive Health Care (the Pepper Commission) chaired by Senator John D. Rockefeller IV, which contributed to the health care debate before and during the Clinton administration in the 1990s. She served in that administration as Principal Deputy Assistant Secretary of the Department of Health and Human Services.

=== 2006 House election ===
Incumbent Frank Wolf (R) was expected to have an easy reelection in Northern Virginia's 10th congressional district but Feder posed a surprisingly strong challenge. An October 10 poll by R.T. Strategies showed Judy Feder to be within 5% at 42% to Wolf's 47%. Late in the campaign, the DCCC added Va-10 to their target list due to Feder's strong campaign and prodigious fund-raising, bringing in a total of $1.6 million. The DCCC also sent her a late contribution of $75,000.00.

Ultimately, Feder lost to Wolf, 57.25%-40.89%, but gave him the closest challenge he had faced in 24 years (with the obvious exceptions of the 1982 and 1986 campaigns). The 10th district is notorious as a difficult district for challengers due to its reliance upon the expensive Washington, D.C. media market. This is evidenced by the fact that Wolf required multiple campaigns to win the seat.

=== 2008 House election ===
In February 2008, CQ Politics rated Feder ninth nationally in terms of "U.S. House Candidates challenging incumbents of the opposite party who had the most cash-on-hand as of Dec. 31." She won the June 10 Democratic primary by a closer than expected margin over a conservative opponent. She faced Republican incumbent Frank Wolf in the November 4 general election in a rematch of their 2006 contest.

Judy Feder lost the bid for election to Frank Wolf during the November 4 general elections 39% to 60%. With 190 of 194 precincts reporting she had 123,627 votes to Frank Wolf's 198,286 votes and Neraj Nigam's 7,353 votes. In a year when Democrats won the Presidential vote and the open Virginia Senate race, Judy Feder actually received a lower percentage of the vote than she had received in 2006.
