= 1994 United States House of Representatives elections in Virginia =

- November 8, 1994

All 11 Virginia seats to the United States House of Representatives
	Majority party	Minority party
Party	Democratic	Republican
Last election	7	4
Seats won	6	5
Seat change	▼1	▲1
Popular vote	752,701	1,089,242
Percentage	39.43%	57.08%
Swing	▼9.07%	▲8.83%

Democratic
40–50%
50–60%
60–70%
70–80%
80–90%
Republican
50–60%
60–70%
70–80%
80–90%
90–100%

The 1994 United States House of Representatives elections in Virginia were held on November 8, 1994, to determine who would represent the Commonwealth of Virginia in the United States House of Representatives. Virginia has eleven seats in the House, apportioned according to the 1990 United States census. Representatives are elected for two-year terms.

== Overview ==
United States House of Representatives elections in Virginia, 1994
Party	Votes	Percentage	Seats	+/–
Republican	1,089,242	57.08%	4	+1
Democratic	752,701	39.43%	7	-1
Independents/write-ins	66,811	3.50%	0	-
Totals	1,908,754	100.00%	11	—

== See also ==
- 1994 United States House of Representatives elections
