= 2014 United States House of Representatives elections in Virginia =

- November 4, 2014

All 11 Virginia seats to the United States House of Representatives
	Majority party	Minority party
Party	Republican	Democratic
Last election	8	3
Seats won	8	3
Seat change	Steady	Steady
Popular vote	1,143,747	845,939
Percentage	53.56%	39.62%
Swing	▲3.39%	▼8.66%

Republican
50–60%
60–70%
70–80%
80–90%
Democratic
40–50%
50–60%
60–70%
70–80%
80–90%
90–100%

The 2014 United States House of Representatives elections in Virginia were held on Tuesday, November 4, 2014, to elect the 11 members from the state of Virginia to the United States House of Representatives, one from each of the state's 11 congressional districts. On the same day, elections took place for other federal and state offices, including an election to the United States Senate. Primary elections, in which party nominees were chosen, were held on June 10, 2014.

On June 10, 2014, Republican Eric Cantor became the first sitting House majority leader to lose in a primary election since the position was created in 1899.

As of 2026, this is the last time Republicans won the House popular vote in Virginia, although they would nevertheless continue to hold a majority of seats in the state until 2018.

== Overview ==
United States House of Representatives elections in Virginia, 2014
Party	Votes	Percentage	Seats before	Seats after	+/–
Republican	1,143,747	53.56%	8	8	-
Democratic	845,939	39.62%	3	3	-
Libertarian	47,038	2.20%	0	0	-
Independent Greens	30,662	1.44%	0	0	-
Green	1,739	0.08%	0	0	-
Independents/Write-In	66,206	3.10%	0	0	-
Totals	2,135,331	100.00%	11	11	—

=== By district ===
Results of the 2014 United States House of Representatives elections in Virginia by district:

District	Republican		Democratic		Others		Total		Result
District	Votes	%	Votes	%	Votes	%	Votes	%	Result
District 1	131,861	62.90%	72,059	34.38%	5,701	2.72%	209,621	100.0%	Republican hold
District 2	101,558	58.68%	71,178	41.13%	324	0.19%	173,060	100.0%	Republican hold
District 3	0	0.00%	139,197	94.43%	8,205	5.57%	147,402	100.0%	Democratic hold
District 4	120,684	60.15%	75,270	37.52%	4,684	2.33%	200,638	100.0%	Republican hold
District 5	124,735	60.86%	73,482	35.86%	6,728	3.28%	204,945	100.0%	Republican hold
District 6	133,898	74.51%	0	0.00%	45,810	25.49%	179,708	100.0%	Republican hold
District 7	148,026	60.83%	89,914	36.95%	5,411	2.22%	243,351	100.0%	Republican hold
District 8	63,810	31.42%	128,102	63.08%	11,164	5.50%	203,076	100.0%	Democratic hold
District 9	117,465	72.15%	0	0.00%	45,350	27.85%	162,815	100.0%	Republican hold
District 10	125,914	56.49%	89,957	40.36%	7,039	3.16%	222,910	100.0%	Republican hold
District 11	75,796	40.36%	106,780	56.86%	5,229	2.78%	187,805	100.0%	Democratic hold
Total	1,143,747	53.56%	845,939	39.62%	145,645	6.82%	2,135,331	100.0%	

== District 1 ==
2014 Virginia's 1st congressional district election
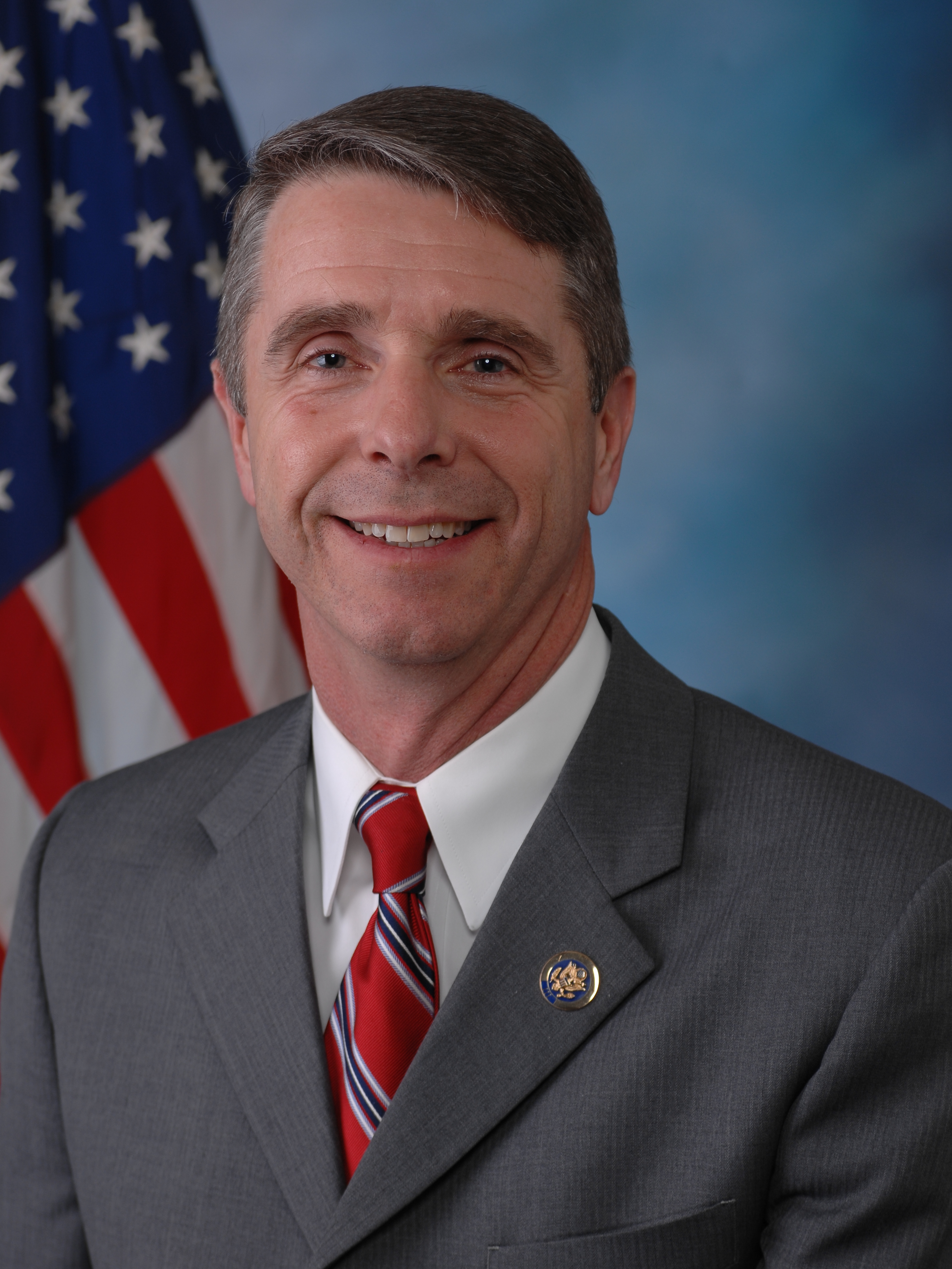

Nominee	Rob Wittman	Norm Mosher
Party	Republican	Democratic
Popular vote	131,861	72,059
Percentage	62.9%	34.4%
- County and independent city results Wittman: 50–60% 60–70% 70–80% 80–90% Mosher: 50–60% 60–70%
U.S. Representative before election
Rob Wittman
Republican
Elected U.S. Representative
Rob Wittman
Republican

Republican Rob Wittman had represented Virginia's 1st congressional district since 2007 and ran for re-election.

=== Republican primary ===
==== Candidates ====
===== Nominee =====
- Rob Wittman, incumbent U.S. representative

===== Eliminated in primary =====
- Anthony Riedel, public relations specialist for National Right to Work Legal Defense Foundation

==== Results ====
Republican primary results
Party	Candidate	Votes	%
Republican	Rob Wittman (incumbent)	13,292	76.2
Republican	Anthony Riedel	4,159	23.8
Total votes		17,451	100.0

=== Democratic primary ===
==== Candidates ====
===== Nominee =====
- Norm Mosher, former navy officer and U.S. Senate staffer

=== Minor candidates ===
- Chris Hailey (write-in), government teacher at Lafayette High School
- Gail Parker (independent), retired U.S. Air Force officer and perennial candidate

==== Withdrew ====
- Xavian Draper (Libertarian) did not achieve ballot access.

=== General election ===
==== Endorsements ====
Rob Wittman (R)

Organizations

- National Federation of Independent Business
- National Rifle Association - Political Victory Fund
- National Right to Life Committee
Norm Mosher (D)

Labor unions

- AFL-CIO

Organizations

- LGBT Democrats
Gail Parker (IG)

Organizations

- Independent Greens of Virginia

==== Predictions ====
Source	Ranking	As of
The Cook Political Report	Safe R	November 3, 2014
Rothenberg	Safe R	October 24, 2014
Sabato's Crystal Ball	Safe R	October 30, 2014
RCP	Safe R	November 2, 2014
Daily Kos Elections	Safe R	November 4, 2014

==== Results ====
Virginia's 1st congressional district, 2014
Party	Candidate	Votes	%
Republican	Rob Wittman (incumbent)	131,861	62.9
Democratic	Norm Mosher	72,059	34.4
Independent Greens	Gail Parker	5,097	2.4
Write-in		606	0.3
Majority			
Total votes		209,623	100.0
Republican hold			

External links

- Rob Wittman campaign website
- Norm Mosher campaign website
- Gail Parker campaign website

== District 2 ==
2014 Virginia's 2nd congressional district election
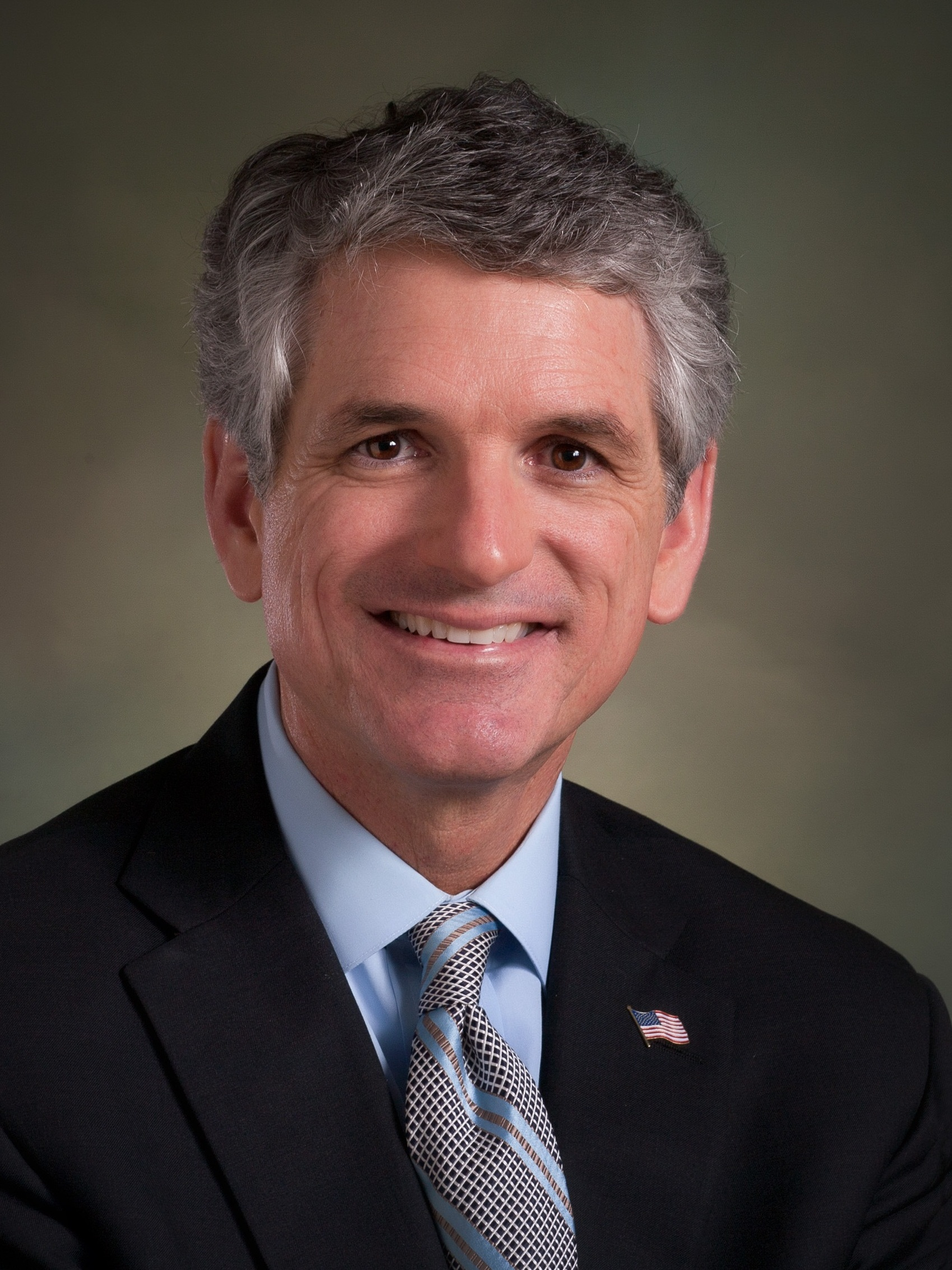

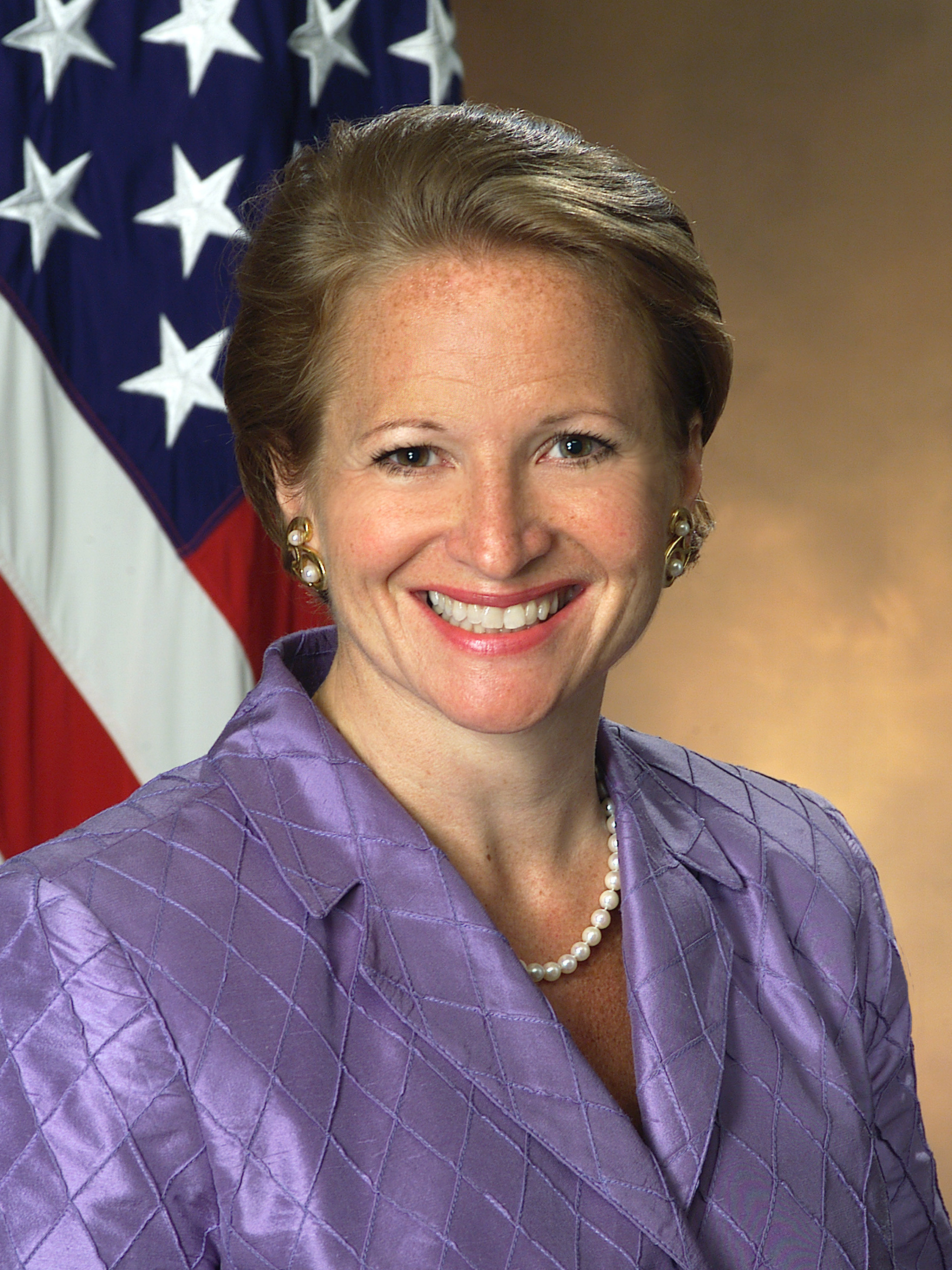
Candidate	Scott Rigell	Suzanne Patrick
Party	Republican	Democratic
Popular vote	101,558	71,178
Percentage	58.7%	41.1%
- County and independent city results Rigell: 50–60% 60–70%
U.S. Representative before election
Scott Rigell
Republican
Elected U.S. Representative
Scott Rigell
Republican

Republican Scott Rigell represented Virginia's 2nd congressional district since 2011. He won re-election to a second term in 2012 against Democratic businessman Paul Hirschbiel with 54% of the vote. Rigell ran for re-election.

=== Republican primary ===
==== Candidates ====
===== Nominee =====
- Scott Rigell, incumbent U.S. representative

=== Democratic primary ===
==== Candidates ====
===== Nominee =====
- Suzanne Patrick, retired Navy Commander

=== Minor parties ===
==== Withdrew ====
- Allen Knapp (Libertarian) was not listed on the ballot.
- John Smith (Independent Green) was not listed on the ballot.

=== General election ===
==== Endorsements ====
Scott Rigell (R)

Organizations

- National Federation of Independent Business
- National Right to Life Committee
Suzanne Patrick (D)

Labor unions

- AFL-CIO

Organizations

- EMILY's List
- LGBT Democrats
- Sierra Club

==== Predictions ====
Source	Ranking	As of
The Cook Political Report	Safe R	November 3, 2014
Rothenberg	Safe R	October 24, 2014
Sabato's Crystal Ball	Safe R	October 30, 2014
RCP	Safe R	November 2, 2014
Daily Kos Elections	Safe R	November 4, 2014

==== Results ====
Virginia's 2nd congressional district, 2014
Party	Candidate	Votes	%
Republican	Scott Rigell (incumbent)	101,558	58.7
Democratic	Suzanne Patrick	71,178	41.1
Write-in		326	0.2
Total votes		173,062	100.0
Republican hold			

External links

- Scott Rigell campaign website
- Suzanne Patrick campaign website

== District 3 ==
2014 Virginia's 3rd congressional district election
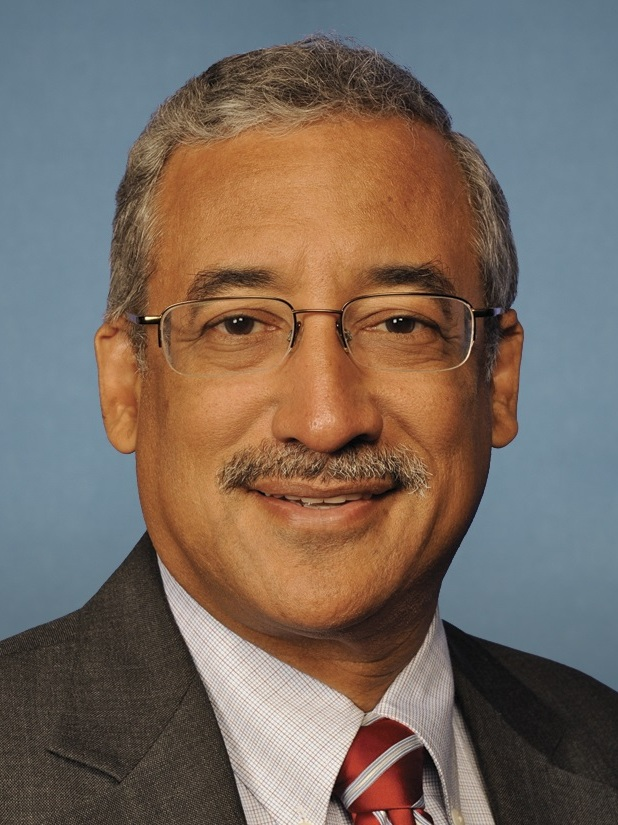
Candidate	Bobby Scott
Party	Democratic
Popular vote	139,197
Percentage	94.4%
- County and independent city results Scott: 80–90% >90%
U.S. Representative before election
Bobby Scott
Democratic
Elected U.S. Representative
Bobby Scott
Democratic

Democrat Bobby Scott had represented Virginia's 3rd congressional district since 1993. He won re-election to an eleventh term in 2012 against Republican businessman Dean Longo, with 81% of the vote. Scott ran for re-election unopposed.

=== Democratic primary ===
==== Candidates ====
===== Nominee =====
- Bobby Scott, incumbent U.S. representative

=== Minor parties ===
- Justin Gandino-Saadein (independent) was not listed on the ballot.
- Justin Upshaw (Libertarian) was not listed on the ballot.

=== General election ===
==== Endorsements ====
Bobby Scott (D)

Labor unions

- National Association of Letter Carriers

Organizations

- Everytown for Gun Safety
- Human Rights Campaign
- Sierra Club

==== Predictions ====
Source	Ranking	As of
The Cook Political Report	Safe D	November 3, 2014
Rothenberg	Safe D	October 24, 2014
Sabato's Crystal Ball	Safe D	October 30, 2014
RCP	Safe D	November 2, 2014
Daily Kos Elections	Safe D	November 4, 2014

==== Results ====
Virginia's 3rd congressional district, 2014
Party	Candidate	Votes	%
Democratic	Bobby Scott (incumbent)	139,197	94.4
Write-in		8,206	5.6
Total votes		147,403	100.0
Democratic hold			

External Links

- Bobby Scott campaign website

== District 4 ==
2014 Virginia's 4th congressional district election
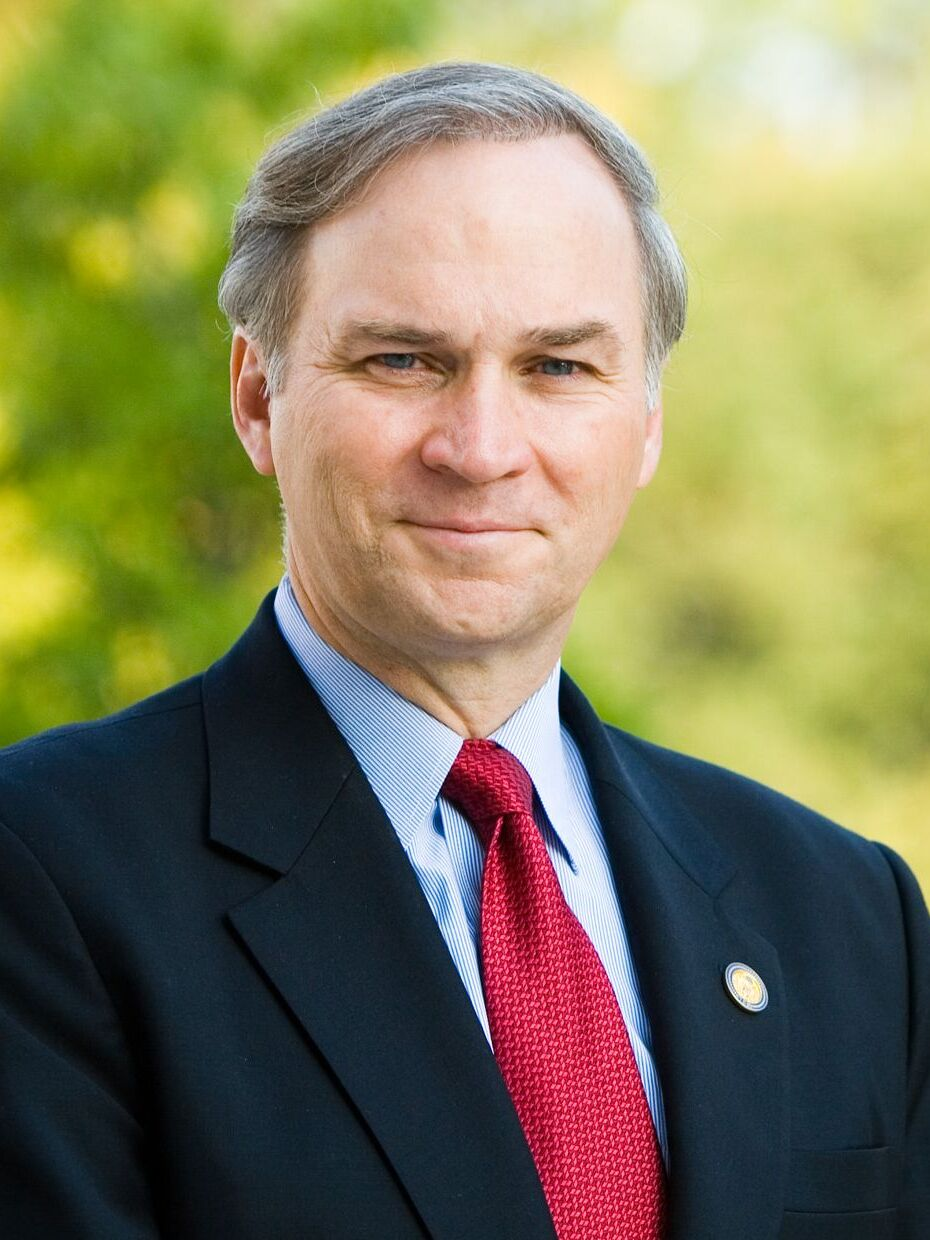

Candidate	Randy Forbes	Elliott Fausz
Party	Republican	Democratic
Popular vote	120,684	75,270
Percentage	60.1%	37.5%
- County and independent city results Forbes: 50–60% 60–70% 70–80% 80–90% Fausz: 50–60%
U.S. Representative before election
Randy Forbes
Republican
Elected U.S. Representative
Randy Forbes
Republican

Republican Randy Forbes had represented Virginia's 4th congressional district since 2001. He won re-election in 2012 against Democratic Chesapeake City Councilwoman Ella Ward, with 57% of the vote. Forbes ran for re-election.

=== Republican primary ===
==== Candidates ====
===== Nominee =====
- Randy Forbes, incumbent U.S. representative

=== Democratic primary ===
==== Candidates ====
===== Nominee =====
- Elliott Fausz, publishing manager

=== Minor parties ===
- Bo Brown (Libertarian), accounting professional

==== Withdrew ====
- Albert Burckardt (Independent Green) was not listed on the ballot.

=== General election ===
==== Endorsements ====
Randy Forbes (R)

Organizations

- National Federation of Independent Business
- National Rifle Association - Political Victory Fund
- National Right to Life Committee
Elliott Fausz (D)

U.S. Senators

- Mark Warner, U.S. senator (2009-present)

State officials

- Ralph Northam, Lieutenant Governor of Virginia

Labor unions

- AFL-CIO
- American Federation of Teachers
- Police Benevolent Association
- United Auto Workers

Organizations

- Alliance for Retired Americans
- LGBT Democrats
Bo Brown (L)

Organizations

- The Virginia Liberty Party

==== Predictions ====
Source	Ranking	As of
The Cook Political Report	Safe R	November 3, 2014
Rothenberg	Safe R	October 24, 2014
Sabato's Crystal Ball	Safe R	October 30, 2014
RCP	Safe R	November 2, 2014
Daily Kos Elections	Safe R	November 4, 2014

==== Results ====
Virginia's 4th congressional district, 2014
Party	Candidate	Votes	%
Republican	Randy Forbes (incumbent)	120,684	60.1
Democratic	Elliott Fausz	75,270	37.5
Libertarian	Bo Brown	4,427	2.2
Write-in		263	0.1
Total votes		200,644	100.0
Republican hold			

External links

- Randy Forbes campaign website
- Elliott Fausz campaign website
- Bo Brown campaign website

== District 5 ==
2014 Virginia's 5th congressional district election
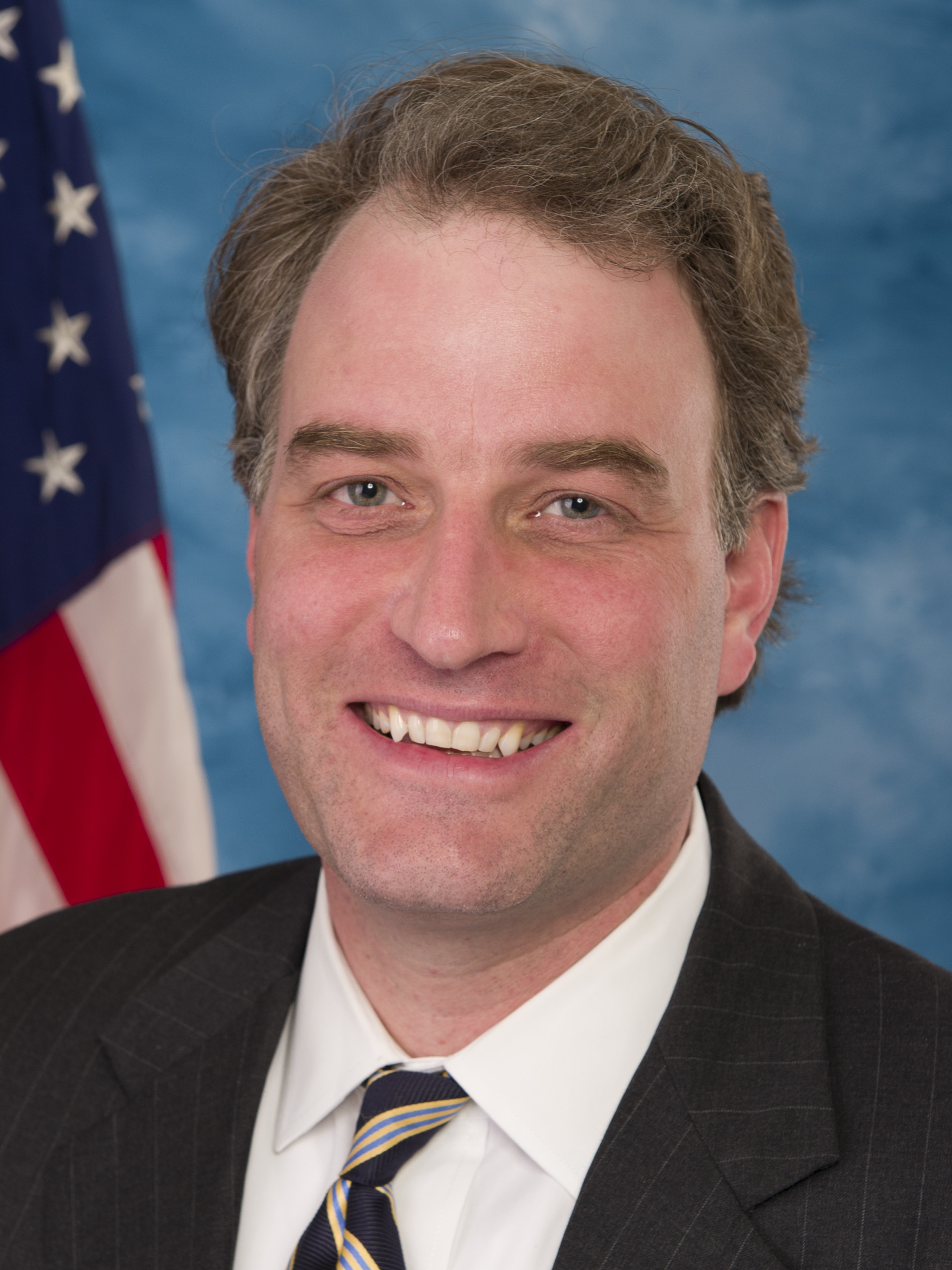

Candidate	Robert Hurt	Lawrence Gaughan
Party	Republican	Democratic
Popular vote	124,735	73,482
Percentage	60.9%	35.9%
- County and independent city results Hurt: 50–60% 60–70% 70–80% Gaughan: 40–50% 50–60% 70–80%
U.S. Representative before election
Robert Hurt
Republican
Elected U.S. Representative
Robert Hurt
Republican

Republican Robert Hurt had represented Virginia's 5th congressional district since 2011. He won re-election to a second term in 2012 against Democrat John W. Douglass, with 55% of the vote. Hurt ran for re-election.

=== Republican primary ===
==== Candidates ====
===== Nominee =====
- Robert Hurt, incumbent U.S. representative

=== Democratic convention ===
==== Candidates ====
===== Nominee =====
- Lawrence Gaughan, actor and political activist

===== Eliminated at the convention =====
- Ben Hudson, teacher and retired U.S. Army Lieutenant Colonel

==== Results ====
Hudson challenged Gaughan at the Democratic convention on May 31, 2014. Gaughan won the nomination.

=== Minor parties ===
- Kenneth Hildebrandt (Independent Green), former chiropractic physician
- Paul Jones (Libertarian), entrepreneur and owner of the Belvedere Company

=== General election ===
==== Endorsements ====
Robert Hurt (R)

Organizations

- National Federation of Independent Business
- National Rifle Association - Political Victory Fund
- National Right to Life Committee
Lawrence Gaughan (D)

Labor unions

- AFL-CIO

Organizations

- LGBT Democrats
Paul Jones (L)

Organizations

- The Virginia Liberty Party

==== Predictions ====
Source	Ranking	As of
The Cook Political Report	Safe R	November 3, 2014
Rothenberg	Safe R	October 24, 2014
Sabato's Crystal Ball	Safe R	October 30, 2014
RCP	Safe R	November 2, 2014
Daily Kos Elections	Safe R	November 4, 2014

==== Results ====
Virginia's 5th congressional district, 2014
Party	Candidate	Votes	%
Republican	Robert Hurt (incumbent)	124,735	60.9
Democratic	Lawrence Gaughan	73,482	35.9
Libertarian	Paul Jones	4,298	2.1
Independent Greens	Kenneth Hildebrandt	2,209	1.1
Write-in		224	0.1
Total votes		204,948	100.0
Republican hold			

External links

- Robert Hurt campaign website
- Lawrence Gaughan campaign website
- Paul Jones campaign page
- Kenneth Hildebrandt campaign website

== District 6 ==
2014 Virginia's 6th congressional district election
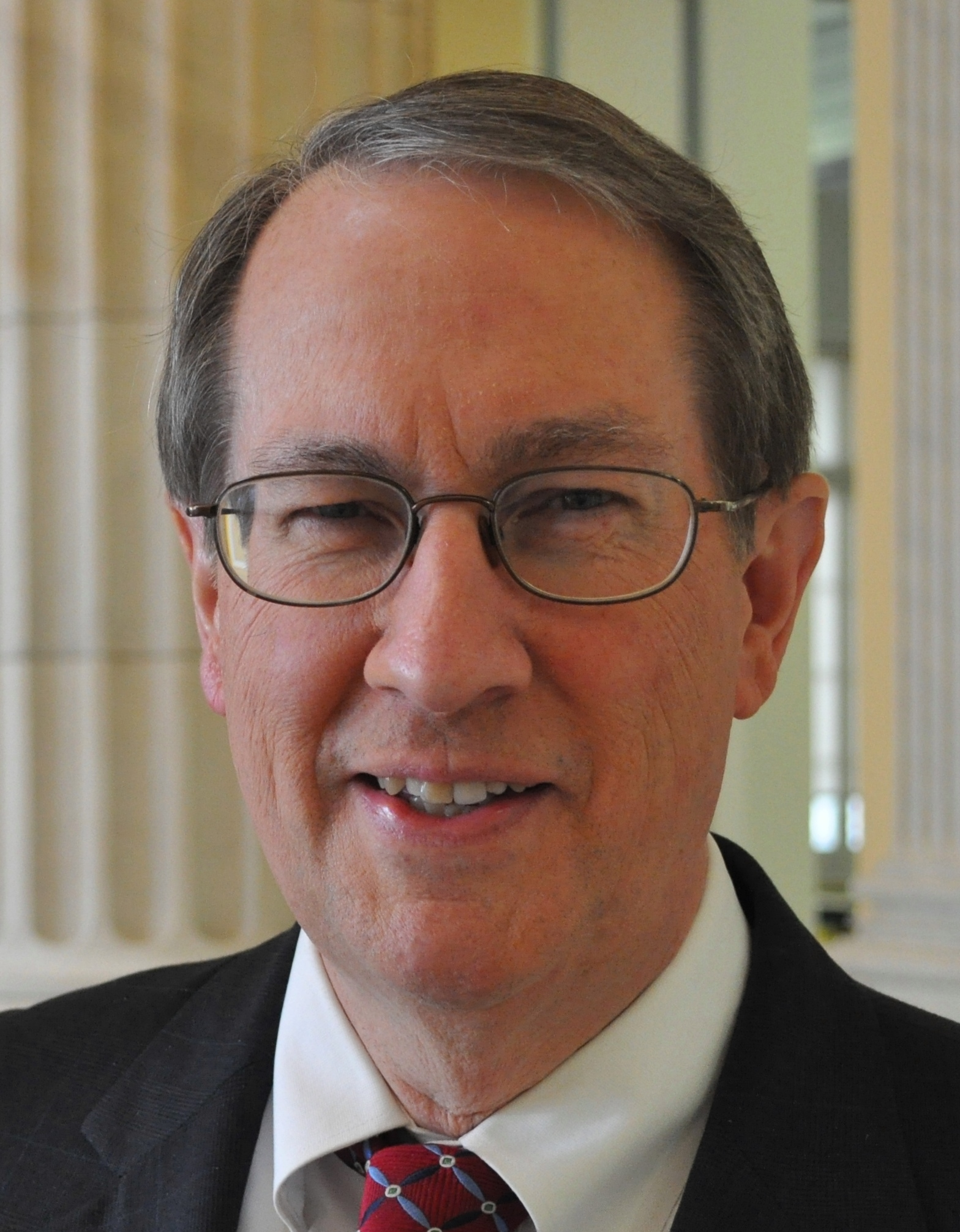

Nominee	Bob Goodlatte	Will Hammer	Elaine Hildebrandt
Party	Republican	Libertarian	Independent Greens
Popular vote	133,898	22,161	21,447
Percentage	74.5%	12.3%	11.9%
- County and independent city results Goodlatte: 50–60% 60–70% 70–80% 80–90%
U.S. Representative before election
Bob Goodlatte
Republican
Elected U.S. Representative
Bob Goodlatte
Republican

Republican Bob Goodlatte had represented Virginia's 6th congressional district since 1993. He won his eleventh term to Congress over Democrat Andy Schmookler with 65% of the vote in 2012. Goodlatte was running for re-election.

=== Republican primary ===
==== Candidates ====
===== Nominee =====
- Bob Goodlatte, incumbent U.S. representative

=== Democratic primary ===
Bruce Elder, a Staunton City Councilman, the only Democrat to file, had to end his campaign after being diagnosed with cancer. As a result, Democrats did not field any candidate to challenge Goodlatte.

==== Candidates ====
===== Withdrawn =====
- Bruce Elder, Staunton City Councilman

=== Minor parties ===
- Will Hammer (Libertarian)
- Elaine Hildebrandt (Independent Green)

=== General election ===
==== Endorsements ====
Bob Goodlatte (R)

Organizations

- National Federation of Independent Business
- National Rifle Association - Political Victory Fund
- National Right to Life Committee
Will Hammer (L)

Organizations

- The Virginia Liberty Party

==== Predictions ====
Source	Ranking	As of
The Cook Political Report	Safe R	November 3, 2014
Rothenberg	Safe R	October 24, 2014
Sabato's Crystal Ball	Safe R	October 30, 2014
RCP	Safe R	November 2, 2014
Daily Kos Elections	Safe R	November 4, 2014

==== Results ====
Virginia's 6th congressional district, 2014
Party	Candidate	Votes	%
Republican	Bob Goodlatte (incumbent)	133,898	74.5
Libertarian	Will Hammer	22,161	12.3
Independent Greens	Elaine Hildebrandt	21,447	11.9
Write-in		2,202	1.2
Total votes		179,708	100.0
Republican hold			

External links

- Bob Goodlatte campaign website
- Will Hammer campaign website

== District 7 ==
2014 Virginia's 7th congressional district election
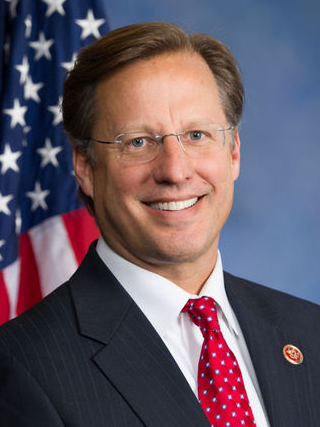

Nominee	Dave Brat	Jack Trammell
Party	Republican	Democratic
Popular vote	148,026	89,914
Percentage	60.8%	36.9%
- County and independent city results Brat: 40–50% 50–60% 60–70%
U.S. Representative before election
Dave Brat
Republican
Elected U.S. Representative
Dave Brat
Republican

Eric Cantor, the U.S. House Majority Leader, had represented the 7th District since 2001. Cantor won re-election to a seventh term in 2012 against Democrat Wayne Powell with 58% of the vote.

=== Republican primary ===
On June 10, 2014, Cantor lost the Republican primary to college professor Dave Brat. This was the first time a sitting House Majority Leader lost a primary election since the position was created in 1899.

==== Candidates ====
===== Nominee =====
- Dave Brat, Randolph–Macon College professor and economist

===== Eliminated in primary =====
- Eric Cantor, incumbent U.S. representative and House Majority Leader

===== Withdrawn =====
- Pete Greenwald, Senior Naval Science Instructor at Chesterfield County Public Schools

==== Polling ====
Poll source	Date(s) administered	Sample size (Note: Key: A – all adults RV – registered voters LV – likely voters V – unclear)	Margin of error	Eric Cantor	Dave Brat	Undecided
McLaughlin & Associates (R-Cantor)	May 27–28, 2014	400	±4.9%	62%	28%	11%

==== Fundraising ====
Campaign finance reports as of May 21, 2014
Candidate	Raised	Spent	Cash on hand
Eric Cantor (R)	$6,649,687	$7,699,242	$30,692
Dave Brat (R)	$206,663	$122,792	$122,792
Source: Federal Election Commission

==== Results ====
County and independent city results Brat: 50–60%; 60–70%; Cantor: 50–60%; 60–70%

Republican primary results
Party	Candidate	Votes	%
Republican	Dave Brat	36,105	55.5
Republican	Eric Cantor (incumbent)	28,912	44.5
Total votes		65,017	100.0

=== Democratic primary ===
==== Candidates ====
===== Nominee =====
- Jack Trammell, Randolph-Macon College professor

=== Minor parties ===
- James Carr (Libertarian), financial analyst

==== Withdrew ====
- Tareq Salahi (Independent Green), television personality and write-in candidate for governor in 2013 (declared as a Republican, then switched parties). Originally, Joe Oddo, the state chair for the Independent Greens, was listed as the 7th district's candidate. However, Salahi failed to file the required 1,000 signatures to get on the ballot.

=== Special election ===
2014 Virginia's 7th congressional district special election
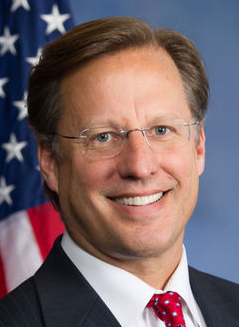

Nominee	Dave Brat	Jack Trammell
Party	Republican	Democratic
Popular vote	148,841	91,236
Percentage	61.7%	37.8%
- County and independent city results Brat: 50–60% 60–70% 70–80%
U.S. Representative before election
Eric Cantor
Republican
Elected U.S. Representative
Dave Brat
Republican

A special election was held on the same date as the general election as Cantor resigned from Congress on August 18, 2014, after his surprise loss to Brat.

==== Results ====
Virginia's 7th congressional district, 2014 (special)
Party	Candidate	Votes	%
Republican	Dave Brat	148,841	61.7
Democratic	Jack Trammell	91,236	37.8
Write-in		1,263	0.5
Total votes		241,340	100.0
Republican hold			

=== General election ===
==== Endorsements ====
Dave Brat (R)

State officials

- Mitt Romney, former governor of Massachusetts and 2012 Republican presidential nominee

Organizations

- Eagle Forum
- The Fredericksburg Virginia Patriots
- National Rifle Association - Political Victory Fund
- Tea Party Express
- The Virginia Liberty Party
Jack Trammell (D)

Labor unions

- AFL-CIO
James Carr (L)

Organizations

- The Virginia Liberty Party

==== Predictions ====
Source	Ranking	As of
The Cook Political Report	Safe R	November 3, 2014
Rothenberg	Safe R	October 24, 2014
Sabato's Crystal Ball	Safe R	October 30, 2014
RCP	Safe R	November 2, 2014
Daily Kos Elections	Safe R	November 4, 2014

==== Results ====
Virginia's 7th congressional district, 2014
Party	Candidate	Votes	%
Republican	Dave Brat	148,026	60.8
Democratic	Jack Trammell	89,914	36.9
Libertarian	James Carr	5,086	2.1
Write-in		332	0.1
Total votes		243,358	100.0
Republican hold			

External links

- Dave Brat campaign website
- Jack Trammell campaign website
- James Carr campaign website

== District 8 ==
2014 Virginia's 8th congressional district election
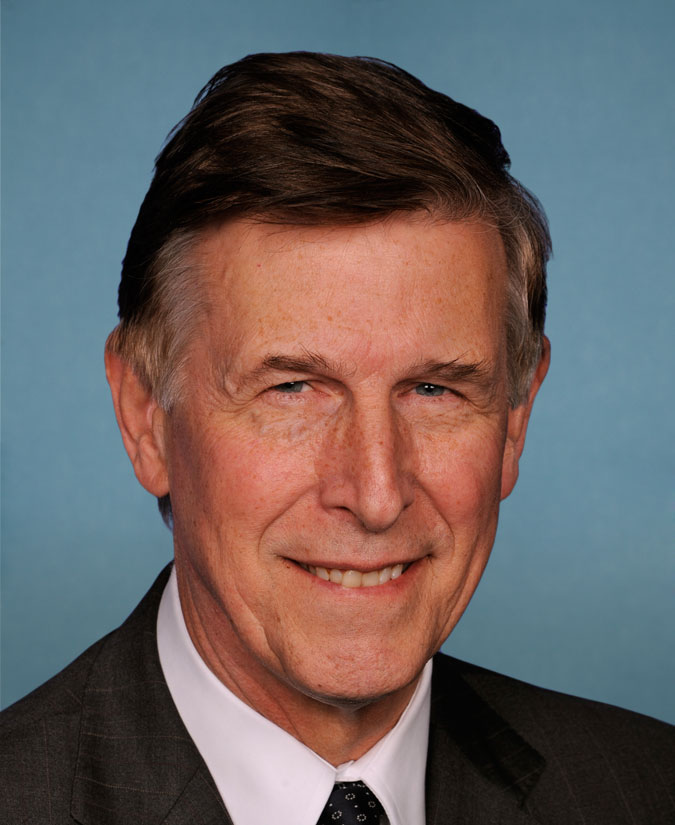

Nominee	Don Beyer	Micah Edmond
Party	Democratic	Republican
Popular vote	128,102	63,810
Percentage	63.1%	31.4%
- County and independent city results Beyer: 50–60% 60–70%
U.S. Representative before election
Jim Moran
Democratic
Elected U.S. Representative
Don Beyer
Democratic

Democrat Jim Moran, who had represented Virginia's 8th congressional district since 1991, was re-elected in 2012 over Republican Jay Patrick Murray with 65% of the vote. On January 15, 2014, Moran announced that he would retire from Congress, rather than run for re-election.

=== Democratic primary ===
==== Candidates ====
===== Nominee =====
- Don Beyer, former lieutenant governor (1990–1998), nominee for governor in 1997, and former United States Ambassador to Switzerland and Liechtenstein (2009–2013)

===== Eliminated in primary =====
- Lavern Chatman, former president and CEO of the Northern Virginia Urban League
- Adam Ebbin, state senator
- William Euille, Mayor of Alexandria
- Patrick Hope, state delegate
- Derek Hyra, college professor and Alexandria Planning Commission member
- Mark Levine, talk radio host and former chief legislative counsel to Congressman Barney Frank

===== Withdrawn =====
- Charniele Herring, state delegate and former chair of the Democratic Party of Virginia
- Satish Korpe, businessman
- Alfonso H. Lopez, state delegate
- Nancy Najarian, business development consultant
- Bruce Shuttleworth, businessman and candidate for the seat in 2012
- Mark Sickles, state delegate

===== Declined =====
- Bob Brink, state delegate
- Aneesh Chopra, former chief technology officer of the United States and candidate for lieutenant governor in 2013
- Kerry J. Donley, former mayor of Alexandria
- Barbara Favola, state senator
- Paul Ferguson, Arlington County Clerk of the Court
- Jay Fisette, chair of the Arlington County Board of Supervisors
- Libby Garvey, Arlington County Supervisor
- Rob Krupicka, state delegate
- Ryan McElveen, member of the Fairfax County School Board
- Jeff McKay, Fairfax County Supervisor
- Brian Moran, Secretary of Public Safety of Virginia, former state delegate and candidate for governor in 2009
- Karyn Moran
- Jim Moran, incumbent U.S. representative
- Tom Perriello, former U.S. representative and president and CEO of the Center for American Progress Action Fund
- Scott Surovell, state delegate
- Walter Tejada, Arlington County Supervisor

==== Endorsements ====
Don Beyer

State officials

- Howard Dean, former governor of Vermont and former chair of the Democratic National Committee
- Linwood Holton, former governor of Virginia
- Madeline Kunin, former governor of Vermont
- John Milliken, former Virginia Secretary of Transportation
- Bill Richardson, former governor of New Mexico, former United States Secretary of Energy, and candidate for president in 2008

State legislators

- Bob Brink, state delegate
- Judy Connally, former state delegate
- Karen Darner, former state delegate
- Ira Lechner, former state delegate
- Toddy Puller, state senator
- Jim Scott, former state delegate
- David Speck, former State Delegate and former Alexandria City Council member
- Marian Van Landingham, former state delegate
- Mary Margaret Whipple, former state senator

Labor unions

- National Association of Postal Supervisors
- Professional Aviation Safety Specialists

Organizations

- Council for a Livable World

Newspapers

- Falls Church News-Press
- The Washington Post

Local officials

- David Bell, former Arlington County Clerk of the Court
- Kerry J. Donley, former Mayor of Alexandria
- Phil Duncan, Falls Church City Council member
- Paul Ferguson, Arlington County Clerk of the Court
- Gerry Hyland, Fairfax County Supervisor
- Dana Kauffman, former Fairfax County Supervisor
- Lonnie Rich, former Alexandria City Council member
- Lilla Richards, former Fairfax County Supervisor
- Lawrence Webb, Falls Church School Board member

Individuals

- Melody Barnes, former director of the United States Domestic Policy Council
- Bill Dolan, nominee for Virginia Attorney General in 1993 and 1997
- Rebecca Jaramillo, mounding Member of the Democratic Party of Virginia Latino Caucus and former executive board member of the Democratic Latino Organization of Virginia
- Robley Jones, public education advocate
- Kate Michelman, President Emeritus of NARAL Pro-Choice America
- Chris Miller, environmental leader
- Harris Miller, former chair of the Fairfax County Democratic Committee and candidate for U.S. Senate in 2006
- Irene Natividad, President of Global Summit of Women
- Lynda Johnson Robb, former First Lady of Virginia
- Larry Schweiger, environmental leader
- David Snyder, Vice Mayor of Falls Church
- Patricia Sosa, political commentator on To The Contrary
Lavern Chatman

Individuals

- Oprah Winfrey
Adam Ebbin

U.S. Representatives

- Keith Ellison, U.S. representative (MN-05) and co-chair of the Congressional Progressive Caucus

State legislators

- Chap Petersen, state senator
- Mark Sickles, state delegate
- Patsy Ticer, former state senator and former Mayor of Alexandria

Organizations

- Gay & Lesbian Victory Fund
- National Organization for the Reform of Marijuana Laws

Local officials

- Sally Baird, member of the Arlington County School Board
- Eileen Cassidy-Rivera, former Alexandria School Board member
- Brad Center, former Fairfax County School Board member
- Sandy Evans, Fairfax County School Board member
- Tammy Kaufax, Fairfax County School Board member
- Art Schmalz, former Alexandria School Board member
- Paul Smedberg, Alexandria City Councilman
- Ted Velkoff, Fairfax County School Board member
- Joyce Woodson, former Alexandria City Councilwoman

Individuals

- Elmer Arias, former president of the El Salvadorian Chamber of Commerce
- Ed Fendley, former member of the Arlington County School Board
- Jay Fisette, chair of the Arlington County Board of Supervisors
- Leni Gonzalez, board member of the Virginia Coalition of Latino Organizations and political activist
- Mike Lieberman, former chair of the Arlington County Democratic Committee
- Kathleen Murphy, candidate for State Delegate in 2013
- Alfred Taylor, former president of the Nauck Civic Association
- Andres Tobar, former chair of the Virginia Coalition of Latino Organizations
- Howard Woodson, former president of the NAACP
- Nelson Zavaleta, president of the Arlandria Civic Association
William Euille

Local officials

- Ronnie Campbell, Alexandria School Board member
- William Campbell, Alexandria School Board member
- John Chapman, Alexandria City Councilor
- Tim Lovain, Alexandria City Councilor
- Del Pepper, Alexandria City Councilor
- Bryan Porter, Alexandria Commonwealth's Attorney
Patrick Hope

State legislators

- Kaye Kory, state delegate
- Scott Surovell, state delegate

Organizations

- Arab American Democratic Caucus of Virginia
- Blue America
Mark Levine

U.S. Senators

- Chris Coons, U.S. senator (D-DE)

Individuals

- Michael E. Mann, climatologist
Bruce Shuttleworth

U.S. Representatives

- Dennis Kucinich, former U.S. representative and candidate for president in 2004 and 2008

Labor unions

- National Nurses United

==== Polling ====
Poll source	Date(s) administered	Sample size	Margin of error	Don Beyer	Lavern Chatman	Adam Ebbin	William Euille	Charniele Herring	Patrick Hope	Derek Hyra	Mark Levine	Bruce Shuttleworth	Undecided
EMC Research (D-Shuttleworth)	May 1–5, 2014	402	±4.9%	30%	3%	9%	8%	3%	9%	0%	3%	3%	31%

==== Results ====
Democratic primary results
Party	Candidate	Votes	%
Democratic	Don Beyer	17,783	45.7
Democratic	Patrick Hope	7,095	18.3
Democratic	Adam Ebbin	5,262	13.5
Democratic	William Euille	3,264	8.4
Democratic	Mark Levine	2,613	6.7
Democratic	Lavern Chatman	2,117	5.5
Democratic	Derek Hyra	479	1.2
Democratic	Charniele Herring (withdrew)	126	0.3
Democratic	Bruce Shuttleworth (withdrew)	85	0.2
Democratic	Satish Korpe (withdrew)	42	0.1
Total votes		38,866	100.0

=== Republican convention ===
==== Candidates ====
- Dennis Bartow, wine importer and former congressional aide
- Micah Edmond, aerospace industry lobbyist and former congressional aide
- Paul Haring, former Texas state representative and candidate for Texas's 34th congressional district in 2012

==== Endorsements ====
Micah Edmond

Organizations

- National Defense PAC

==== Results ====
Micah Edmond won the nomination for the seat at the 8th District Republican Convention on April 26, 2014, with 51% of the vote.

=== Minor parties ===
- Gwendolyn Beck (independent)
- Gerard Blais (Independent Green)
- Jeffrey Carson (Libertarian), U.S. Army veteran

=== General election ===
==== Endorsements ====
Don Beyer (D)

State officials

- Howard Dean, former governor of Vermont and former chair of the Democratic National Committee
- Linwood Holton, former governor of Virginia
- Madeline Kunin, former governor of Vermont
- John Milliken, former Virginia Secretary of Transportation
- Bill Richardson, former governor of New Mexico, former United States Secretary of Energy, and candidate for president in 2008

State legislators

- Bob Brink, state delegate
- Judy Connally, former state delegate
- Karen Darner, former state delegate
- Ira Lechner, former state delegate
- Toddy Puller, state senator
- Jim Scott, former state delegate
- David Speck, former State Delegate and former Alexandria City Council member
- Marian Van Landingham, former state delegate
- Mary Margaret Whipple, former state senator

Labor unions

- AFL-CIO
- National Association of Letter Carriers
- National Association of Postal Supervisors
- Professional Aviation Safety Specialists

Organizations

- Council for a Livable World
- Everytown for Gun Safety
- Human Rights Campaign
- LGBT Democrats
- Sierra Club

Local officials

- Kerry J. Donley, former Mayor of Alexandria
- Gerry Hyland, Fairfax County Supervisor
- Lawrence Webb, Falls Church School Board member

Individuals

- Melody Barnes, former director of the United States Domestic Policy Council
- Harris Miller, former chair of the Fairfax County Democratic Committee and candidate for U.S. Senate in 2006
- Lynda Johnson Robb, former first lady of Virginia
Micah Edmond (R)

Organizations

- National Defense PAC
- National Right to Life Committee
Jeffrey Carson (L)

Organizations

- The Virginia Liberty Party

==== Predictions ====
Source	Ranking	As of
The Cook Political Report	Safe D	November 3, 2014
Rothenberg	Safe D	October 24, 2014
Sabato's Crystal Ball	Safe D	October 30, 2014
RCP	Safe D	November 2, 2014
Daily Kos Elections	Safe D	November 4, 2014

==== Results ====
Virginia's 8th congressional district, 2014
Party	Candidate	Votes	%
Democratic	Don Beyer	128,102	63.1
Republican	Micah Edmond	63,810	31.4
Independent	Gwendolyn Beck	5,420	2.7
Libertarian	Jeffrey Carson	4,409	2.2
Independent Greens	Gerry Blais	963	0.5
Write-in		376	0.2
Total votes		203,080	100.0
Democratic hold			

External links

- Micah Edmond campaign website
- Don Beyer campaign website
- Jeffrey Carson campaign website
- Gerard Blais campaign website
- Gwendolyn Beck campaign website

== District 9 ==
2014 Virginia's 9th congressional district election
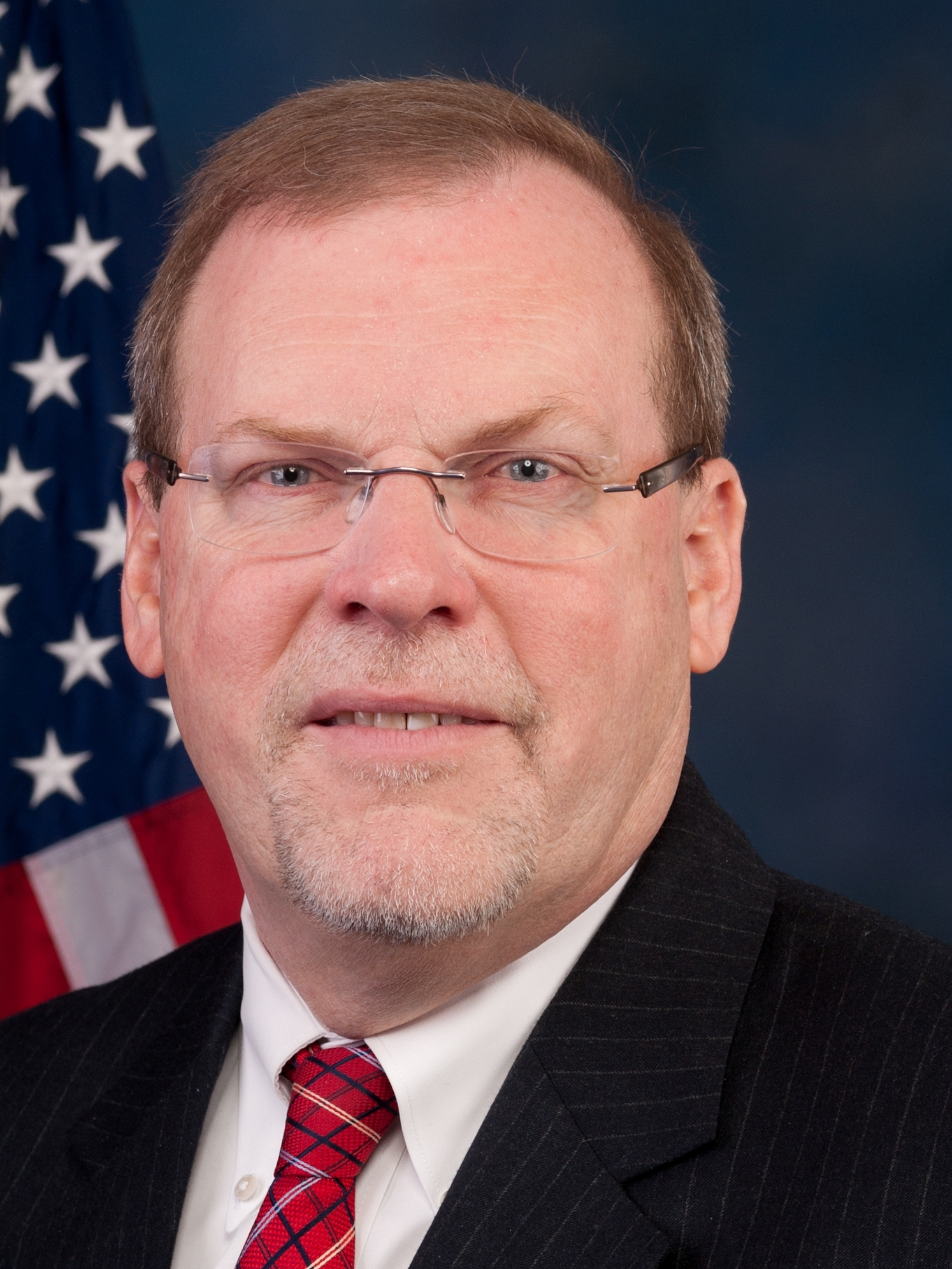

Nominee	Morgan Griffith	William Carr
Party	Republican	Independent
Popular vote	117,465	39,412
Percentage	72.1%	24.2%
- County and independent city results Griffith: 50–60% 60–70% 70–80% 80–90%
U.S. Representative before election
Morgan Griffith
Republican
Elected U.S. Representative
Morgan Griffith
Republican

Republican Morgan Griffith had represented Virginia's 9th congressional district since 2011. He won re-election to a second term in 2012 against Democrat Anthony Flaccavento with 61% of the vote. Griffith ran for re-election.

=== Republican primary ===
==== Candidates ====
===== Nominee =====
- Morgan Griffith, incumbent U.S. representative

=== Minor parties ===
- William Carr (independent), businessman

==== Withdrew ====
- Matthew Edwards (Libertarian) was not listed on the ballot.

=== General election ===
==== Endorsements ====
Morgan Griffith (R)

Organizations

- National Federation of Independent Business
- National Rifle Association - Political Victory Fund
- National Right to Life Committee

==== Predictions ====
Source	Ranking	As of
The Cook Political Report	Safe R	November 3, 2014
Rothenberg	Safe R	October 24, 2014
Sabato's Crystal Ball	Safe R	October 30, 2014
RCP	Safe R	November 2, 2014
Daily Kos Elections	Safe R	November 4, 2014

==== Results ====
Virginia's 9th congressional district, 2014
Party	Candidate	Votes	%
Republican	Morgan Griffith (incumbent)	117,465	72.1
Independent	William Carr	39,412	24.2
Write-in		5,940	3.7
Total votes		162,817	100.0
Republican hold			

External links

- Morgan Griffith campaign website
- William Carr campaign website

== District 10 ==
2014 Virginia's 10th congressional district election
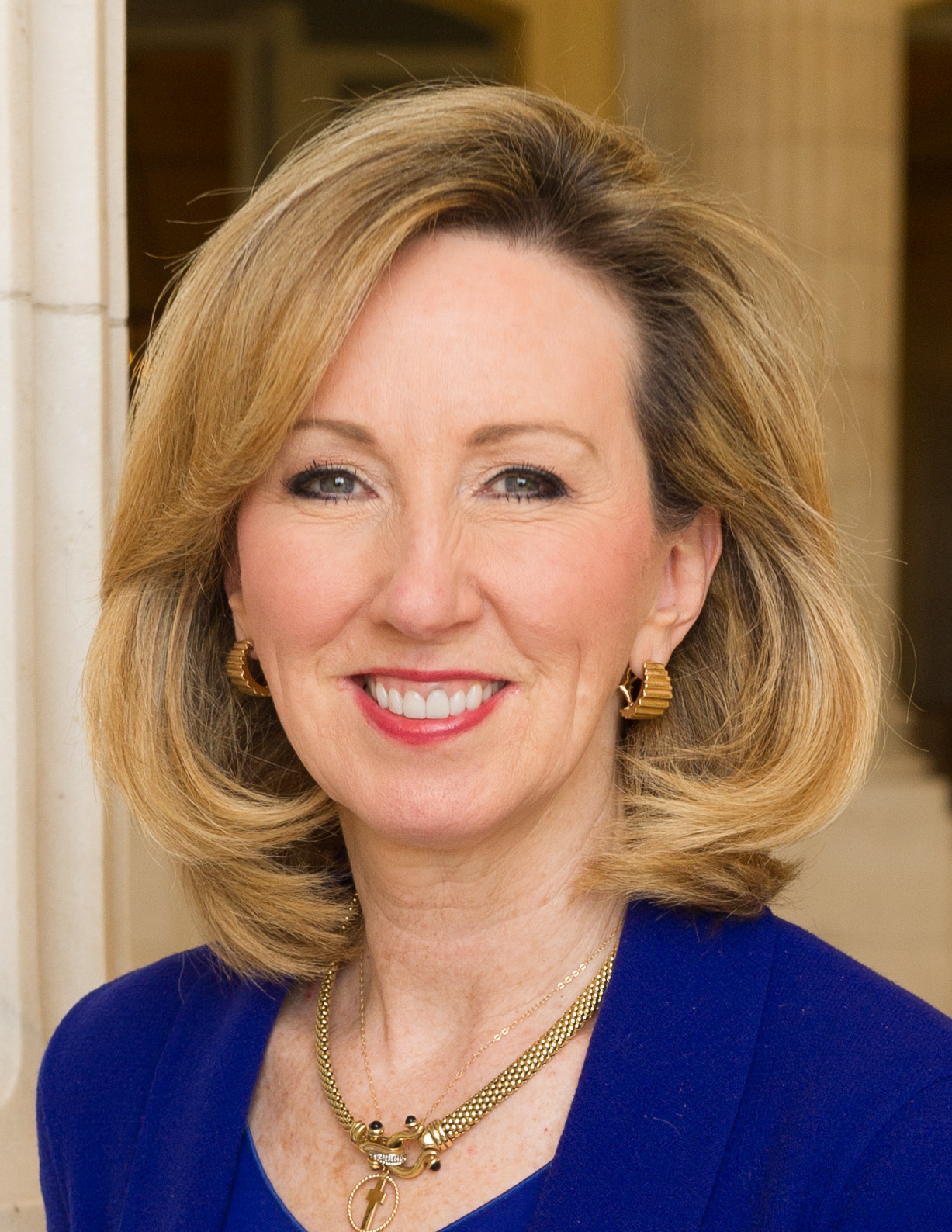

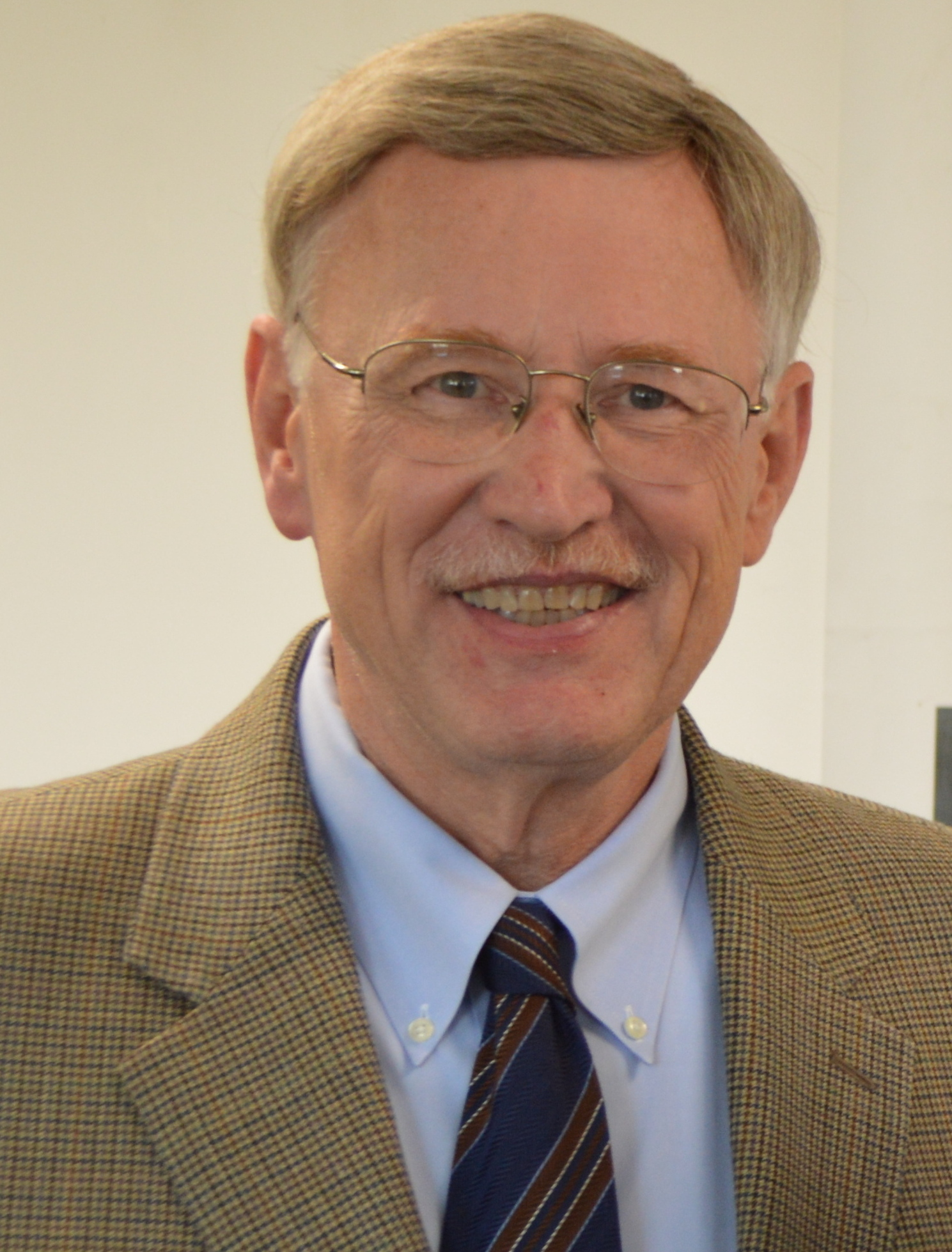
Candidate	Barbara Comstock	John Foust
Party	Republican	Democratic
Popular vote	125,914	89,957
Percentage	56.5%	40.4%
- County and independent city results Comstock: 50–60% 60–70% 70–80% Foust: 40–50%
U.S. Representative before election
Frank Wolf
Republican
Elected U.S. Representative
Barbara Comstock
Republican

Republican Frank Wolf had served 17 terms in the House of Representatives. He announced in January 2014 that he would not seek re-election in 2014.

=== Republican primary ===
Six candidates filed to run for the Republican nomination. There were two debates for the Republican candidates, held on March 15 and April 9.

==== Candidates ====
===== Nominee =====
- Barbara Comstock, state delegate and chief of staff to Frank Wolf

===== Eliminated in primary =====
- Stephen Hollingshead, former United States Department of Housing and Urban Development adviser and nominee for WI-05 in 1994
- Howie Lind, former chair of the 10th Congressional District Republican Committee and former candidate for the U.S. Senate
- Bob Marshall, state delegate
- Marc Savitt, president of the National Association of Independent Housing Professionals
- Rob Wasinger, former chief of staff to Congressman Kerry Bentivolio and candidate for KS-01 in 2010

===== Withdrawn =====
- Brent Anderson, retired US Air Force officer
- Dick Black, state senator
- Luellen Hoffman, director of exhibits at the National Defense Industrial Association
- Tareq Salahi, television personality and write-in candidate for governor in 2013

===== Declined =====
- Carol Brauninger
- Beau Correll, attorney and chair of the Winchester Republican Committee
- Ken Cuccinelli, Attorney General of Virginia and nominee for governor in 2013
- Artur Davis, former Democratic U.S. representative from Alabama
- Michael Farris, founder of Patrick Henry College, the Home School Legal Defense Association and nominee for lieutenant governor in 1993
- Keith Fimian, businessman and Republican nominee for the 11th District in 2008 and 2010
- Bill Fox, Loudoun County School Board member
- Pat Herrity, Fairfax County Supervisor
- Tim Hugo, state delegate
- Jim LeMunyon, state delegate
- Randy Minchew, state delegate
- David Ramadan, state delegate
- Richard Shickle, chair of the Frederick County Board of Supervisors
- Corey Stewart, chair of the Prince William Board of County Supervisors
- John Stirrup, former Prince William County Supervisor
- Jill Holtzman Vogel, state senator
- Suzanne Volpe, Loudoun County Supervisor
- Scott York, chair of the Loudoun County Board of Supervisors

==== Endorsements ====
Barbara Comstock

Executive branch officials

- Jim Nicholson, former United States Secretary of Veterans Affairs, former United States Ambassador to the Holy See, and former chair of the Republican National Committee

U.S. Senators

- Rick Santorum, former U.S. senator and candidate for president in 2012
- Fred Thompson, former U.S. senator (R-TN) and candidate for president in 2008

U.S. Representatives

- Newt Gingrich, former Speaker of the United States House of Representatives and candidate for president in 2012
- Paul Ryan, U.S. representative (WI-01), chair of the House Committee on the Budget and nominee for Vice President of the United States in 2012

State officials

- John Engler, former governor of Michigan
- Mitt Romney, former governor of Massachusetts, candidate for President in 2008 and nominee for President in 2012

State legislators

- Rich Anderson, state delegate
- Ben Cline, state delegate
- Peter Farrell, state delegate
- Tag Greason, state delegate
- Bill Janis, former state delegate
- Jackson Miller, state delegate
- David Ramadan, state delegate

Labor unions

- Associated Builders and Contractors - Virginia Chapter

Organizations

- American Conservative Union
- Citizens United
- GOPAC

Local officials

- Ralph Buona, Loudoun County Supervisor
- Pete Candland, Prince William County Supervisor
- Betsy Davis, Mayor of Middleburg
- Pat Herrity, Fairfax County Supervisor
- Ken Reid, Loudoun County Supervisor
- Debbie Rose, Loudoun County School Board member
- Alyson Satterwhite, Prince William County School Board Member
- Elizabeth Schultz, Fairfax County School Board member
- John Stirrup, former Prince William County Supervisor
- Jill Turgeon, Loudoun County School Board member
- Bob Wertz, Loudoun County Commissioner of Revenue
- Shawn Williams, Vice Chair of the Loudoun County Board of Supervisors
- Scott York, Chair of the Loudoun County Board of Supervisors

Individuals

- Susan Allen, former First Lady of Virginia
- Matt Ames, Chair of the Fairfax County Republican Committee
- Terrence Boulden, President of the Virginia Black Conservative Forum
- L. Brent Bozell III, founder and President of Media Research Center
- Kevin Gentry, conservative activist and vice president of special projects at Koch Industries
- Leonard Leo, executive vice president of the Federalist Society
- Matthew Letorneau, Loudoun County Supervisor
- Mark Levin, talk radio host and conservative political commentator
- Mike Lindsay, Chair of the Frederick County Republican Committee
- Pat Mullins, chair of the Republican Party of Virginia
- Kate O'Beirne, former Washington editor of National Review
- Kate Obenshain, former chair of the Republican Party of Virginia
- Tim Phillips, president of Americans for Prosperity
- John Scott, chair of the Virginia Young Republican Federation
- Pete Snyder, technology executive and candidate for lieutenant governor in 2013
- Steven Spiker, Prince William Area Young Republican chair
- Steven Thomas, chair of the City of Manassas Republican Committee
Stephen Hollingshead

Individuals

- Brent Anderson, retired US Air Force officer and withdrawn candidate
Howie Lind

Organizations

- National Defense PAC
Bob Marshall

U.S. representatives

- Robert Dornan, former U.S. representative

State legislators

- Mark Berg, state delegate
- Dick Black, state senator

Organizations

- Eagle Forum

Local officials

- Bill Fox, Loudoun County School Board member
- Corey Stewart, Chair of the Prince William Board of County Supervisors

Individuals

- Keith Fimian, businessman and Republican nominee for the 11th District in 2008 and 2010
- Bill Kling, former Press Secretary for Senator John Warner
- Elwood Sanders, attorney and political blogger
- Phyllis Schlafly, conservative activist and founder of the Eagle Forum

Media

- Conservative HQ
Rob Wasinger

U.S. representatives

- Kerry Bentivolio, U.S. representative (R-MI-11)

Individuals

- Joe Grieboski, founder and Chair of the Board of THE INSTITUTE on Religion and Public Policy
- Steven W. Mosher, social scientist and author
- Frank Pavone, Catholic priest and National Director of Priests for Life

==== Polling ====
Poll source	Date(s) administered	Sample size	Margin of error	Barbara Comstock	Stephen Hollingshead	Howie Lind	Bob Marshall	Marc Savitt	Rob Wasinger	Undecided
The Polling Company/WomanTrend	April 4–5, 2014	402	±4.9%	44%	3%	3%	10%	1%	3%	30%

==== Results ====
Over 13,000 votes were cast in the firehouse primary held on April 26. Comstock won with 53.9% of the vote. Marshall was second with 28.1%, followed by Lind (8.1%), Hollingshead (5.9%), Wasinger (2.2%), and Savitt (1.6%).

=== Democratic primary ===
==== Candidates ====
===== Nominee =====
- John Foust, Fairfax County Supervisor

===== Withdrawn =====
- Richard Bolger, attorney
- Sam Kubba, architect

===== Declined =====
- Karen Kennedy Schultz, Shenandoah University professor and state senate candidate in 2007

==== Endorsements ====
John Foust

U.S. Representatives

- Jim Moran, U.S. representative

State officials

- Ralph Northam, Lieutenant Governor of Virginia

State legislators

- David Bulova, state delegate
- Bob Brink, state delegate
- Adam Ebbin, state senator
- Barbara Favola, state senator
- Eileen Filler-Corn, state delegate
- Patrick Hope, state delegate
- Janet Howell, state senator
- Mark Keam, state delegate
- Kaye Kory, state delegate
- Alfonso H. Lopez, state delegate
- Dave Marsden, state senator
- Emilie Miller, former state senator
- Chap Petersen, state senator
- Ken Plum, state delegate
- Toddy Puller, state senator
- Dick Saslaw, Majority Leader of the Virginia Senate
- Jim Scott, former state delegate
- Mark Sickles, state delegate
- Marcus Simon, state delegate
- Scott Surovell, state delegate
- Margi Vanderhye, former state delegate
- Vivian Watts, state delegate
- Jennifer Wexton, state senator

Local officials

- Stan Barry, former Fairfax Sheriff
- Sharon Bulova, Chair of the Fairfax County Board of Supervisors
- Kelly Burk, Leesburg Council Member and former Leesburg Supervisor
- Dan Drummond, member of the Fairfax County School Board
- Sandy Evans, member of the Fairfax County School Board
- Penelope Gross, Fairfax County Supervisor
- Cathy Hudgins, Fairfax County Supervisor
- Gerry Hyland, Fairfax County Supervisor
- Pat Hynes, member of the Fairfax County School Board
- Melissa Jonas, Herndon Council Member
- Tammy Kaufax, member of the Fairfax County School Board
- Stacey Kincaid, Fairfax Sheriff
- Rachel Kirkland, Manassas Park School Board member
- Ryan McElveen, member of the Fairfax County School Board
- Jeff McKay, Fairfax County Supervisor
- Megan McLaughlin, member of the Fairfax County School Board
- Ilryong Moon, member of the Fairfax County School Board
- Sheila Olem, Herndon Council Member
- Janet Oleszek, former member of the Fairfax County School Board
- Frank Principi, Prince William County Supervisor
- Kathy Smith, member of the Fairfax County School Board
- Linda Smyth, Fairfax County Supervisor
- Janie Strauss, member of the Fairfax County School Board
- Ted Velkoff, member of the Fairfax County School Board
- Grace Wolf, Herndon Council Member

Individuals

- Jennifer Boysko, candidate for State Delegate in 2013
- Judy Feder, Professor of Public Policy at Georgetown University and nominee in 2010
- Babur Lateef, candidate for Prince William County Supervisor in 2011
- Liz Miller, candidate for State Delegate in 2013
- Kathleen Murphy, candidate for State Delegate in 2013

==== Results ====
John Foust was the only candidate to file for the Democratic nomination; as such, he was certified as the nominee by the Democratic Party in March 2014.

=== Minor parties ===
- Dianne Blais (Independent Green), businesswoman
- Brad Eickholt (independent), former government employee
- Bill Redpath (Libertarian), chair of the Libertarian Party of Virginia

==== Withdrew ====
- Francis "Frank" Pilliere (independent) was not listed on the ballot.
- James Rouse (independent) was not listed on the ballot.

=== General election ===
==== Endorsements ====
Barbara Comstock (R)

Executive branch officials

- Jim Nicholson, former United States Secretary of Veterans Affairs, former United States Ambassador to the Holy See, and former chairman of the Republican National Committee

U.S. Senators

- Rick Santorum, former U.S. senator and candidate for president in 2012
- Fred Thompson, former U.S. senator (R-TN) and candidate for president in 2008

U.S. Representatives

- Newt Gingrich, former Speaker of the United States House of Representatives and candidate for president in 2012
- Paul Ryan, U.S. representative (WI-01), chairman of the House Committee on the Budget and nominee for Vice President of the United States in 2012

State officials

- John Engler, former governor of Michigan
- Mitt Romney, former governor of Massachusetts, candidate for president in 2008 and nominee for president in 2012

State legislators

- Rich Anderson, state delegate
- Tag Greason, state delegate
- Bill Janis, former state delegate
- Jackson Miller, state delegate
- David Ramadan, state delegate

Labor unions

- Associated Builders and Contractors - Virginia Chapter

Organizations

- American Conservative Union
- Citizens United
- GOPAC
- National Rifle Association - Political Victory Fund
- National Right to Life Committee

Newspapers

- Loudoun Times
- Sun Gazette
- The Washington Times
- Winchester Star

Individuals

- Susan Allen, former First Lady of Virginia
- L. Brent Bozell III, founder and President of Media Research Center
- Kevin Gentry, conservative activist and vice president of special projects at Koch Industries
- Leonard Leo, executive vice president of the Federalist Society
- Mark Levin, talk radio host and conservative political commentator
- Pat Mullins, chairman of the Republican Party of Virginia
- Kate O'Beirne, former Washington editor of National Review
- Kate Obenshain, former chair of the Republican Party of Virginia
- Tim Phillips, president of Americans for Prosperity
- Pete Snyder, technology executive and candidate for lieutenant governor in 2013
John Foust (D)

U.S. Representatives

- Jim Moran, U.S. representative

State officials

- Ralph Northam, Lieutenant Governor of Virginia

State legislators

- Bob Brink, state delegate
- David Bulova, state delegate
- Adam Ebbin, state senator
- Barbara Favola, state senator
- Eileen Filler-Corn, state delegate
- Patrick Hope, state delegate
- Janet Howell, state senator
- Mark Keam, state delegate
- Kaye Kory, state delegate
- Alfonso H. Lopez, state delegate
- Dave Marsden, state senator
- Emilie Miller, former state senator
- Chap Petersen, state senator
- Ken Plum, state delegate
- Toddy Puller, state senator
- Dick Saslaw, Majority Leader of the Virginia Senate
- Jim Scott, former state delegate
- Mark Sickles, state delegate
- Marcus Simon, state delegate
- Scott Surovell, state delegate
- Margi Vanderhye, former state delegate
- Vivian Watts, state delegate
- Jennifer Wexton, state senator

Labor unions

- AFL-CIO
- American Federation of Government Employees
- National Association of Letter Carriers
- National Education Association.

Organizations

- Everytown for Gun Safety
- Human Rights Campaign
- Sierra Club

Individuals

- Judy Feder, Professor of Public Policy at Georgetown University and nominee in 2010
Bill Redpath (L)

Organizations

- The Virginia Liberty Party

==== Polling ====
Poll source	Date(s) administered	Sample size	Margin of error	Barbara Comstock (R)	John Foust (D)	Other	Undecided
YouGov	October 16–23, 2014	176	±11%	42%	40%	–	18%
The Polling Company	October 17–18, 2014	404	±4.9%	51%	35%	5%	9%
Victory Research	September 24–28, 2014	–	–	41%	39%	4%	16%
Tarrance Group	September 23–25, 2014	403	±4.9%	46%	34%	7%	14%

==== Predictions ====
Source	Ranking	As of
The Cook Political Report	Lean R	November 3, 2014
Rothenberg	Lean R	October 24, 2014
Sabato's Crystal Ball	Lean R	October 30, 2014
RCP	Tossup	November 2, 2014
Daily Kos Elections	Lean R	November 4, 2014

==== Results ====
Virginia's 10th congressional district, 2014
Party	Candidate	Votes	%
Republican	Barbara Comstock	125,914	56.5
Democratic	John Foust	89,957	40.4
Libertarian	Bill Redpath	3,393	1.5
Independent	Brad Eickholt	2,442	1.1
Independent Greens	Dianne Blais	946	0.4
Write-in		262	0.1
Total votes		222,914	100.0
Republican hold			

External links

- Barbara Comstock campaign website
- John Foust campaign website
- Bill Redpath campaign website
- Dianne Blais campaign website
- Brad Eickholt campaign website

== District 11 ==
2014 Virginia's 11th congressional district election
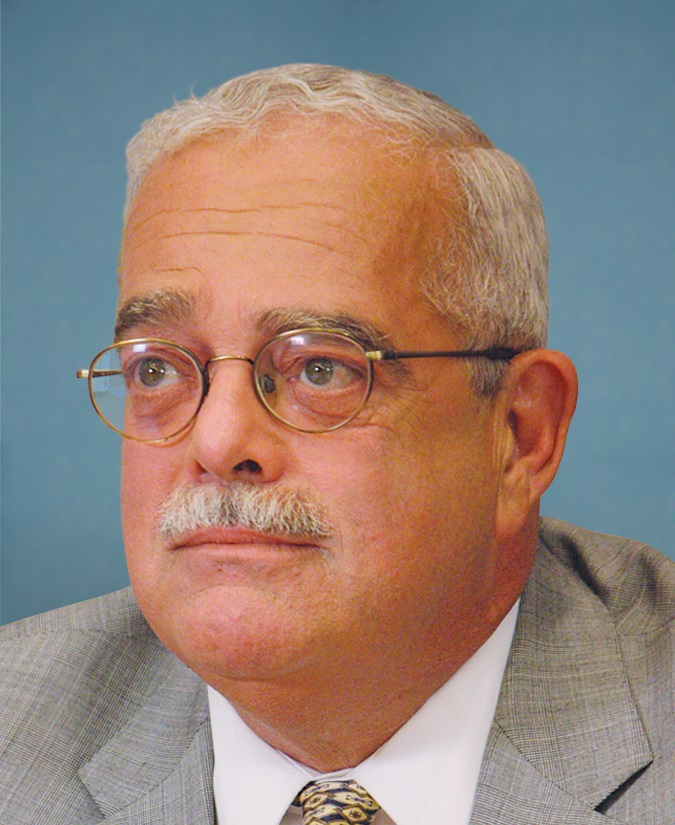

Nominee	Gerry Connolly	Suzanne Scholte
Party	Democratic	Republican
Popular vote	106,780	75,796
Percentage	56.9%	40.4%
- County and independent city results Connolly: 50–60% 60–70%
U.S. Representative before election
Gerry Connolly
Democratic
Elected U.S. Representative
Gerry Connolly
Democratic

Democrat Gerry Connolly, who had represented Virginia's 11th congressional district since 2009, was re-elected in 2012 against Republican Christopher Perkins with 61% of the vote. Connolly was seeking re-election to a fourth term in 2014.

=== Democratic primary ===
==== Candidates ====
===== Nominee =====
- Gerry Connolly, incumbent U.S. representative

=== Republican primary ===
==== Candidates ====
===== Nominee =====
- Suzanne Scholte, human rights activist

=== Minor parties ===
- Joseph "Joe" Galdo (Green Party), former United States Department of Energy employee
- Marc Harrold (Libertarian), attorney, author, television analyst and former law-enforcement officer
- Joseph Plummer (write-in), founder of the Three Birds Foundation

==== Withdrew ====
- Mark Gibson (independent) was not listed on the ballot.

=== General election ===
==== Endorsements ====
Gerry Connolly (D)

Labor unions

- AFL-CIO
- National Association of Letter Carriers

Organizations

- Everytown for Gun Safety
- Human Rights Campaign
- LGBT Democrats
- Sierra Club
Suzanne Scholte (R)

Organizations

- National Right to Life Committee
Marc Harrold (L)

Organizations

- The Virginia Liberty Party

==== Predictions ====
Source	Ranking	As of
The Cook Political Report	Safe D	November 3, 2014
Rothenberg	Safe D	October 24, 2014
Sabato's Crystal Ball	Safe D	October 30, 2014
RCP	Safe D	November 2, 2014
Daily Kos Elections	Safe D	November 4, 2014

==== Results ====
Virginia's 11th congressional district, 2014
Party	Candidate	Votes	%
Democratic	Gerry Connolly (incumbent)	106,780	56.9
Republican	Suzanne Scholte	75,796	40.4
Libertarian	Marc Harrold	3,264	1.7
Green	Joe F. Galdo	1,739	0.9
Write-in		226	0.1
Total votes		187,805	100.0
Democratic hold			

External links

- Gerry Connolly campaign website
- Suzanne Scholte campaign website
- Marc Harrold campaign website
- Joe Galdo campaign website
