= Small Business Capital Access and Job Preservation Act =

- Long title: To amend the Investment Advisers Act of 1940 to provide a registration exemption for private equity fund advisers, and for other purposes.
- Announced in: the 113th United States Congress
- Sponsored by: Rep. Robert Hurt (R, VA-5)
- Number of co-sponsors: 3

Codification
- Acts affected: Investment Advisers Act of 1940
- Agencies affected: U.S. Securities and Exchange Commission

Legislative history
- Introduced in the House as H.R. 1105 by Rep. Robert Hurt (R, VA-5) on March 13, 2013; Committee consideration by United States House Committee on Financial Services; Passed the House on December 4, 2013 (Roll Call Vote 622: 254-159)

The Small Business Capital Access and Job Preservation Act (H.R. 1105) is a bill that would exempt investment advisers from the Security and Exchange Commission’s (SEC’s) registration and reporting requirements when they provide advice to a private equity fund with outstanding debt that is less than twice the amount of capital that has been committed to and invested by the fund. This requirement was created by the Dodd–Frank Wall Street Reform and Consumer Protection Act. The Small Business Capital Access and Job Preservation Act passed in the United States House of Representatives during the 113th United States Congress.

As of November 25, 2014, it has not passed the United States Senate.

== Background ==
Under existing law, "most financial advisory firms that manage more than $150 million in private funds are required to register with and file regular reports to the Securities and Exchange Commission."

== Provisions of the bill ==
This summary is based largely on the summary provided by the Congressional Research Service, a public domain source.

The Small Business Capital Access and Job Preservation Act would amend the Investment Advisers Act of 1940 to exempt private equity fund investment advisers from its registration and reporting requirements, provided that each private equity fund has not borrowed and does not have outstanding a principal amount exceeding twice its invested capital commitments.

The bill would direct the Securities and Exchange Commission (SEC) to promulgate final rules that: (1) require such investment advisers to maintain records the SEC determines necessary, taking into account fund size, governance, investment strategy, and risk; and (2) define the term "private equity fund" for purposes of this Act.

== Congressional Budget Office report ==
This summary is based largely on the summary provided by the Congressional Budget Office, as ordered reported by the House Committee on Financial Services on June 19, 2013. This is a public domain source.

H.R. 1105 would exempt investment advisers from the Security and Exchange Commission’s (SEC’s) registration and reporting requirements when they provide advice to a private equity fund with outstanding debt that is less than twice the amount of capital that has been committed to and invested by the fund. The bill would direct the SEC to adopt rules requiring exempt advisors to maintain records and provide reports to the commission as deemed necessary based on the fund’s size, governance, risk, and investment strategy. Under current law, investment advisers do not have to register or report to the SEC if they advise only venture capital funds that meet certain qualifications.

Based on information from the SEC, the Congressional Budget Office (CBO) expects that implementing H.R. 1105 would not have a significant effect on the agency’s workload. Therefore, we estimate that implementing the bill would not have a significant effect on spending that is subject to appropriation. Further, the SEC is authorized to collect fees sufficient to offset its annual appropriation; therefore, the CBO estimates that the net budgetary effect of implementing H.R. 1105 would be negligible. Enacting H.R. 1105 would not affect direct spending or revenues; therefore, pay-as-you-go procedures do not apply.

H.R. 1105 contains no intergovernmental or private-sector mandates as defined in the Unfunded Mandates Reform Act and would not affect the budgets of state, local, or tribal governments.

== Procedural history ==
The Small Business Capital Access and Job Preservation Act was introduced in the United States House of Representatives on March 13, 2013 by Rep. Robert Hurt (R, VA-5). It was referred to the United States House Committee on Financial Services. On May 23, 2013, the United States House Financial Services Subcommittee on Capital Markets and Government-Sponsored Enterprises held hearings about the bill. The full committee considered the bill on June 19, 2013, and voted 38-18 to report the bill. It was reported alongside House Committee Report 113-276 on November 22, 2013. On November 27, 2013, House Majority Leader Eric Cantor announced the H.R. 1105 would be considered on the House floor on December 4, 2013. On December 4, 2013, the House voted in Roll Call Vote 622 to pass the bill 254-159. 36 Democrats voted in favor of the legislation.

On December 3, 2013, President Barack Obama released a statement threatening to veto the bill.

== Debate and discussion ==
President Obama released a statement "strongly" opposing H.R. 1105 and threatening to veto it on December 3, 2013. In the statement, the administration argued that the "bill’s passage would deny investors access to important information intended to increase transparency and accountability and to minimize conflicts of interest."

Republicans argued that the bill would "help make it easier for these advisers to make investments in small companies." Supporters also argue that the bill would reduce regulatory requirements that make it more difficult for private equity groups to be created. Making it easier for equity groups to develop would then increase the capital available to small businesses. Republican Representative Sam Graves said that passing this bill would reduce red tape.

== See also ==
- List of bills in the 113th United States Congress
- Dodd–Frank Wall Street Reform and Consumer Protection Act
