= 2014 Virginia ballot measures =

The 2014 Virginia State Elections took place on Election Day, November 4, 2014, the same day as the U.S. Senate and U.S. House elections in the state. The only statewide election on the ballot was one constitutional referendum to amend the Virginia State Constitution. Because Virginia state elections are held on off-years, no statewide officers or state legislative elections were held. The referendum was referred to the voters by the Virginia General Assembly. The amendment easily passed with 87% of the vote in favor.

== Question 1 ==
The amendment read:

Shall Section 6-A of Article X (Taxation and Finance) of the Constitution of Virginia be amended to allow the General Assembly to exempt from taxation the real property of the surviving spouse of any member of the armed forces of the United States who was killed in action, where the surviving spouse occupies the real property as his or her principal place of residence and has not remarried?

Question 1
Choice	Votes	%
For	1,841,034	87.31
Against	267,622	12.69
Total	2,108,656	100.00
