= Suzanne Patrick =

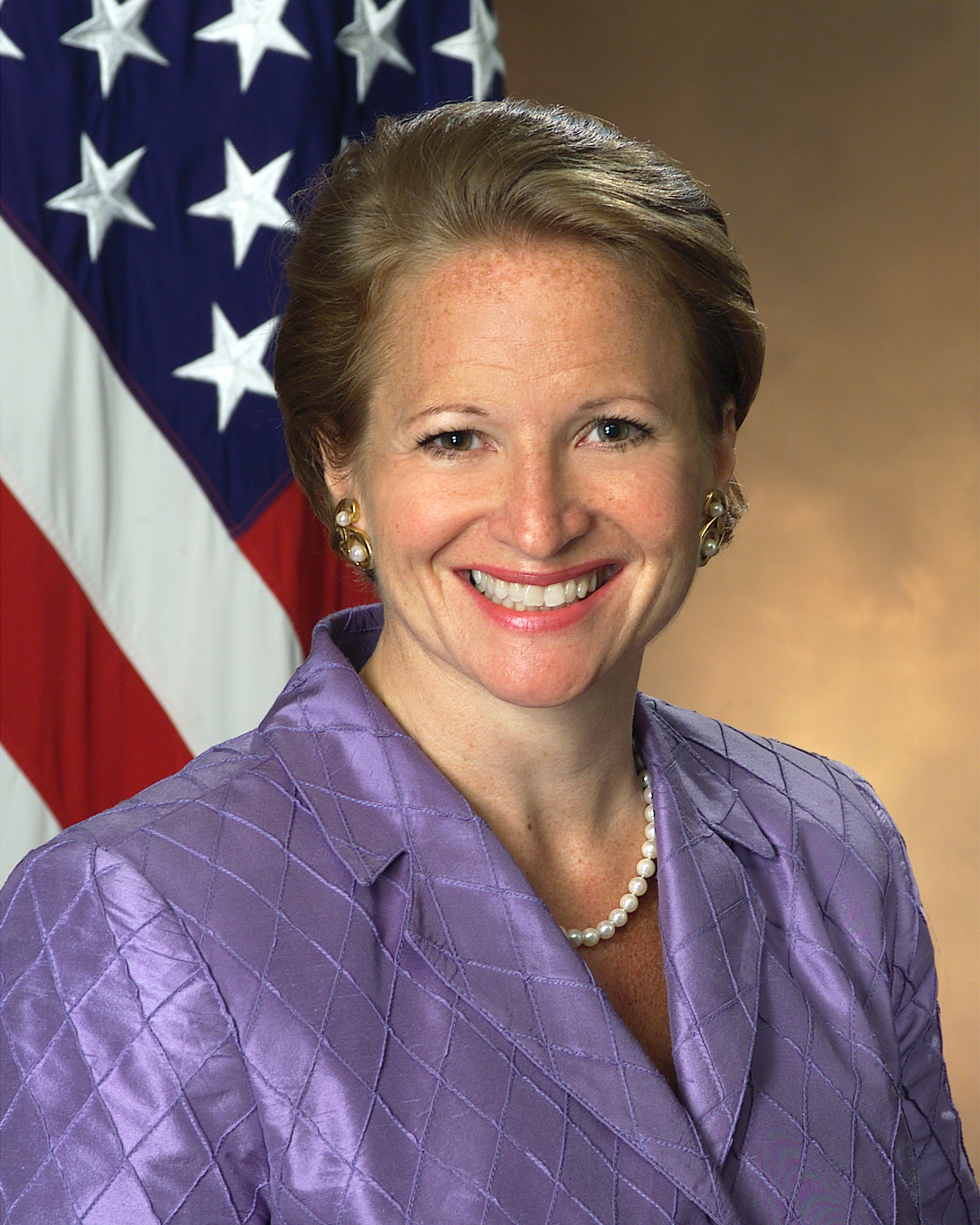

Deputy Under Secretary of Defense for Industrial Policy
- In office July 2001 – July 2005
- President: George W. Bush
- Preceded by: Jeffrey P. Bialos
- Succeeded by: William Greenwalt

Personal details
- Born: October 6, 1955 (age 70)
- Party: Democratic
- Education: Randolph-Macon Women's College; Georgetown University
- Occupation: Consultant

Military service
- Allegiance: United States
- Branch/service: United States Navy
- Years of service: 1991–2013
- Rank: Commander
- Unit: U.S. Naval Reserve

Suzanne Dorothy Patrick (born October 6, 1955) is a retired Navy Commander and a former Deputy Undersecretary of Defense. Patrick, a member of the Democratic Party, ran for Congress in Virginia's 2nd congressional district during the 2014 United States House of Representatives elections.

== Personal life and education ==
Patrick graduated from Randolph-Macon Women's College in 1977, and earned a Master's Degree in national security studies from Georgetown University. Patrick is the fourth generation of her family to serve in the military.

== Career ==
Patrick served in the United States Navy Reserve for 21 years, rising to the rank of Commander. From 2001-2005, she served as Deputy Undersecretary of Defense for industrial policy. She has served as an Aerospace Analyst with Sanford Bernstein, and held senior management positions with Creditanstalt Bank and Ventana Capital Management, LLC. She also founded the hedge fund investment firm New Poland Eagle. She also worked for Secretary of the Navy John Lehman.

== 2014 congressional election ==
Patrick ran for Congress in Virginia's 2nd congressional district, challenging incumbent Republican Congressman Scott Rigell. Patrick criticized Rigell for voting for defense cuts as part of the sequester. The Hill reported that she planned to frame herself as a "centrist Democrat."

Patrick was added to the Democratic Congressional Campaign Committee’s ‘Red to Blue’ program, which provides additional financial support to candidates. The Rothenberg Political Report ratings show the race leaning Republican.

Congresswoman Nancy Pelosi's own campaign committee donated to Patrick’s campaign. Patrick has been endorsed by EMILY's List, a political action committee that supports pro-choice candidates.

Political positions

Patrick opposes repeal of the Affordable Care Act.

== Personal life ==
Patrick has owned a home in Virginia Beach, Virginia since 1991.
