= Professional Aviation Safety Specialists =

PASS
- Professional Aviation Safety Specialists
- Founded: February 1977
- Headquarters: Washington, D.C.
- Location: United States
- Key people: David J. Spero, National President; Carlos Aguirre, National Secretary-Treasurer
- Affiliations: AFL-CIO and Marine Engineers' Beneficial Association
- Website: www.passnational.org

The Professional Aviation Safety Specialists (PASS) is a labor union affiliated with the AFL–CIO through its affiliation with the Marine Engineers' Beneficial Association. It represents more than 11,000 Federal Aviation Administration (FAA) and Department of Defense employees (civilian employees at Marine Corps Air Station Cherry Point). These employees install, maintain, support and certify air traffic control and national defense equipment, inspect and oversee the commercial and general aviation industries, develop flight procedures, and perform quality analyses of complex aviation systems used in air traffic control and national defense in the United States and abroad.

== History ==
=== Founding and leadership ===
The union was founded in 1977 by Howard Johannssen, an FAA safety technician in the agency's Air Traffic Organization. National President David J. Spero is serving his second three-year term, having been reelected in September 2024. Carlos Aguirre was elected national vice president in October 2018, and his title changed to secretary-treasurer later that year. Previous presidents of PASS include Johannssen (1977–1994), Jack Johnson (1994–1997), Mike Fanfalone (1997–2003), Tom Brantley (2003–2012), and Mike Perrone (2012-2021).

Johannssen and 50 of his colleagues gathered in Chicago in February 1977 to form a union, fed up after years of second-class treatment at the FAA. An incident involving a fire at JFK International Airport pointed out the disparate treatment. Unable to unlock a door giving access to a hangar from which smoke was emanating, Johannssen grabbed a fire extinguisher to knock the door down. An air traffic controller saw what was happening and helped. After the incident, Johannssen was told he was facing a suspension for destroying government property. The air traffic controller was given a $500 reward. It was time to form a union.

In 1991, employees in the FAA's Flight Standards Service, part of Aviation Safety, voted to join the union.

=== Employees represented ===
Employees covered under PASS include systems specialists, flight standards and manufacturing aviation safety inspectors, aeronautical information professionals, flight inspection pilots, mission specialists, operations staff, aircraft maintenance employees, legal instruments examiners, compliance specialists and support staff.

=== NextGen ===
PASS-represented employees are instrumental in the successful implementation of the FAA's Next Generation Air Transportation System (NextGen) to modernization the nation's air traffic control system. “The NextGen portfolio encompasses the planning and implementation of innovative new technologies and airspace procedures after thorough testing for safety.”

As part of NextGen, in 2016, PASS members helped complete Standard Terminal Automation Replacement Program System (STARS) deployment at the11 largest TRACONs (terminal radar approach control facility) and air traffic control towers in the country.

=== PASS fights privatization ===
Throughout its history, PASS has fought efforts to privatize the nation's air traffic control system. In 2002, US President George W. Bush signed an executive order allowing the government to hire a private entity to take over air traffic control functions. Then-PASS President Fanfalone said the union's "concern is that the radar that monitors our skies and the voice and radio systems that provide critical communication capabilities should be maintained and certified by committed public servants, answerable to the American people, and not controlled by private interests most concerned about a bottom line."

In April 2015, the union, along with six other unions representing Federal Aviation Administration employees, sent a letter to the US House of Representatives, arguing against proposals to privatize the FAA that came out a congressional hearing the previous month titled "Options for FAA Air Traffic Reform." PASS is opposed to proposals to privatize the nation’s air traffic control system. The United States has the safest, largest, and most complex aviation system in the world and that system should continue to be operated solely for the public’s benefit and safety, not for the benefit of a private entity.

In February 2016, the chair of the U.S. House Transportation and Infrastructure (T&I) Committee introduced legislation that would turn over the operation of the air traffic control system to a nongovernmental entity. In 2017, President Donald Trump announced his support for privatization of the FAA. Writing a month later in the New Jersey Star-Ledger, PASS President Perrone wrote: "This large-scale government reorganization would imperil the core mission of the interrelated segments of the FAA, which are devoted to maintaining safety and efficiency. Collaboration and interaction between every part of the FAA is essential to the success of our aviation system. The FAA manages the most complicated aviation system in the world; splitting the agency up disrupts this proven model and gambles with aviation safety." Efforts by PASS and other labor and industry groups led the T&I chair to abandon privatization in early 2018. Later that year, Congress passed a five-year reauthorization of the FAA which did not privatize the nation's air traffic control system. It was the first five-year reauthorization since 1982 and was signed into law on October 5, 2018.

=== Partial US government shutdown 2018-19 ===
During the partial US government shutdown that lasted from December 22, 2018 through January 25, 2019, thousands of PASS members at the FAA were furloughed during the first few weeks, including aviation safety inspectors, while thousands more were working without pay in airports and air traffic control facilities. The union mounted a public relations campaign, sponsoring informational pickets at airports across the US and speaking to national and local media with the message for lawmakers: 'Don't Gamble With Aviation Safety.'

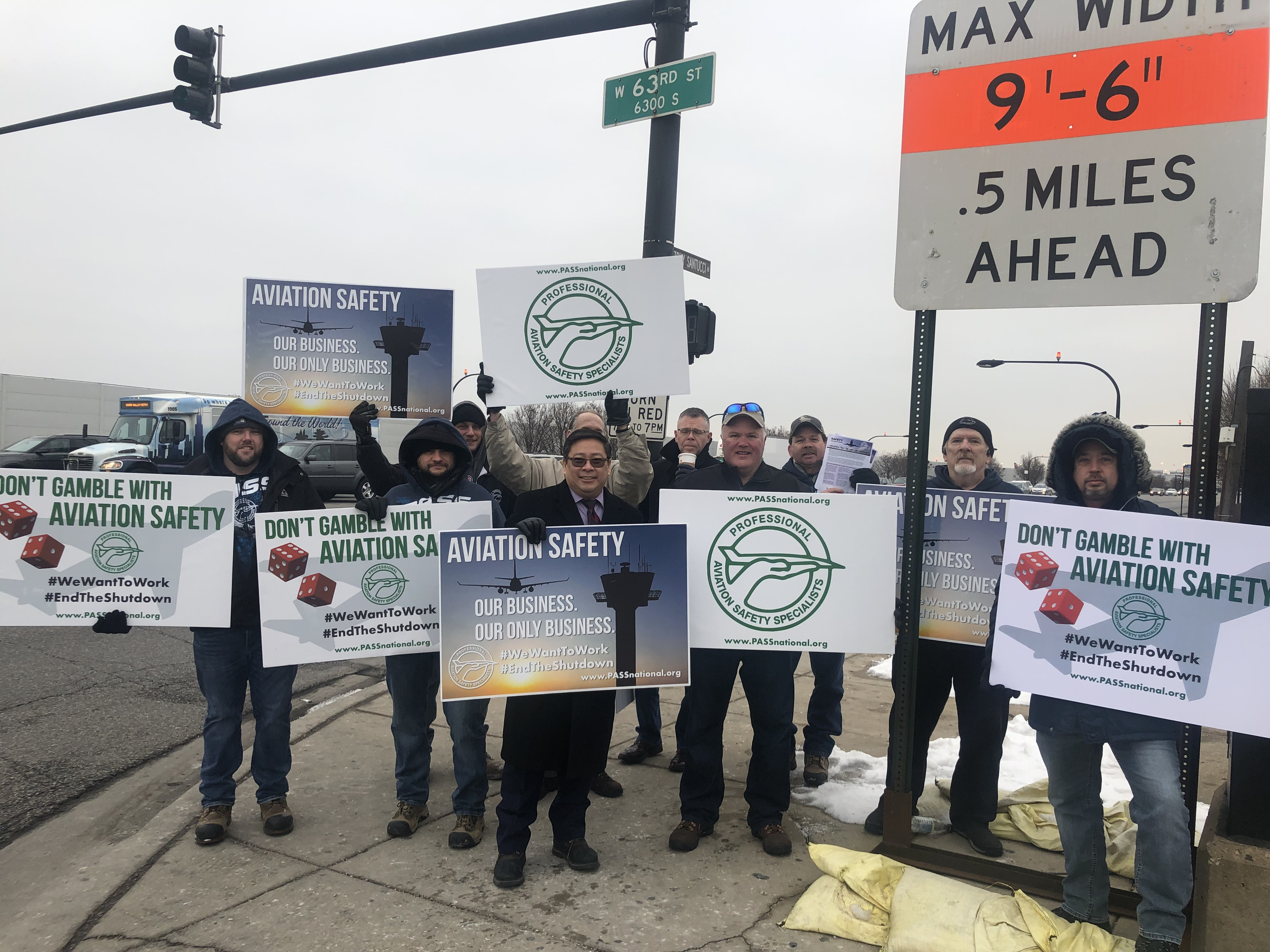
PASS members in Chicago hold a picket outside Midway Airport to alert the public that the partial government shutdown was gambling with aviation safety. They are Federal Aviation Administration employees

After the shutdown ended, PASS National President Perrone testified on Capitol Hill in front of the House Transportation and Infrastructure Committee, Aviation Subcommittee on February 3, 2019 on a panel "Putting U.S. Aviation Safety at Risk: The Impact of the Shutdown." The hearing was called to examine how the recent 35-day partial shutdown of the federal government impacted FAA functions and operations, as well as the US aviation industry and workforce. During his testimony President Perrone said that on each passing day of the shutdown, "A layer of safety was stripped away and the system became exposed to more risk. For example, the FAA was not overseeing foreign repair stations [increasingly used by US airlines] for 35 days and the world knew it. This is not an acceptable standard," he said.
