= Gerald Hyland =

American politician

Gerald W. Hyland

Member of the Fairfax County, Virginia Board of Supervisors from the Mount Vernon district
- In office 1988–2015
- Preceded by: T. Farrell Egge
- Succeeded by: Daniel Storck

Personal details
- Party: Democratic Party
- Education: College of the Holy Cross (BS); Georgetown University (JD); George Washington University (LLM)
- Occupation: Attorney, lobbyist, farmer

Gerald W. "Gerry" Hyland was a member of the Fairfax County, Virginia Board of Supervisors. A Democrat, he has represented the Mount Vernon District (which includes Mount Vernon, Lorton, and Belle Haven) from 1988 to 2015. He retired as a colonel in the United States Air Force after 30 years of service, six of which on active duty, and four overseas.

Hyland was first elected to the Fairfax County Board of Supervisors in 1987, defeating incumbent Republican supervisor T. Farrell Egge by 27 votes.

In February 2015, the 78-year-old Hyland announced he would not seek reelection to the Board of Supervisors, and would retire at the end of the year.
