= Kevin Gentry =

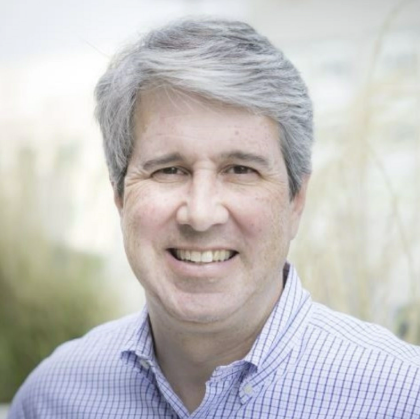
- Gentry in 2025
- Citizenship: United States
- Education: College of William & Mary
- Employer(s): Koch Industries; Stand Together; TenX Strategies
- Website: tenxstrategies.com

Kevin Gentry is a conservative political activist, fundraiser, and podcaster who served as vice president of Stand Together. A top aide to Charles Koch and David H. Koch, Gentry served as vice president of special projects at Koch, Inc. before retiring to launch TenX Strategies.

== Education and personal life ==
Gentry received a BA in economics from the College of William & Mary, where he served as chairman of the school's branch of the College Republicans. He is married to Anne Gentry, an attorney, who obtained a JD from the George Mason University School of Law, where she was the president of the school's branch of the Federalist Society.

== Career ==
From 1991 to 1997, Gentry served as executive vice president of the Leadership Institute, a nonprofit organization based in Arlington, Virginia. Gentry later served as the vice president of the Mercatus Center and the Institute for Humane Studies during which time the two organizations' combined annual revenue increased threefold, according to Philanthropy Magazine. He served as a fundraising consultant for Virginia Governor Jim Gilmore and U.S. Senator George Allen during their tenure in those offices. Gentry was the campaign manager for Morton Blackwell when Blackwell ran as the Republican National Committeeman of Virginia in 1988, 1992, and 1996.

=== Fundraising ===
In 2003, Gentry was hired at the Charles G. Koch Charitable Foundation to improve the capacity of the foundation's grantees by mentoring them in fundraising best practices. He also served as vice president of special projects for Koch, Inc. According to Politico, Gentry is the primary fundraiser for the Koch family's political activities. Gentry's responsibilities include leading fundraising efforts at the Koch's donor seminars. The Koch fundraising summits, emceed by Gentry, were expected to spend $400 million on conservative causes heading into the 2012 election. According to The Washington Post, Gentry "raises money for the network of Koch-backed organizations, some of which are prominent conservative think tanks". Gentry led an informal network of fundraisers for think tanks and advocacy groups such as Americans for Prosperity.

In December 2010, Gentry joined the board of the Cato Institute. Gentry was placed on the board by Charles Koch and David Koch. Cato Institute chairman Robert Levy and president Edward Crane expressed concern that Gentry was a conservative rather than a libertarian, with Crane referring to Gentry as a "Republican activist" and "social conservative." Crane also expressed disappointment that Gentry had not involved Crane or other Cato Institute employees with Koch-sponsored donor events. In an opinion editorial posted on CNN.com, Gentry defended the Koch brothers against allegations that they wanted to compromise the political independence of the Cato Institute. In June 2012, as part of a settlement over the ownership of the Cato Institute, Gentry was removed from the board due to a provision that bars Koch employees from serving on the institute's board.

For contributions to the free market movement, Gentry was presented with the Roe Award in 2007 by the State Policy Network. The award is given to "recognize individuals who exhibit leadership, innovation and achievement in promoting free markets and less intrusive government at the state and local level. Gentry is credited with helping raise over $3 billion for philanthropic causes during his fundraising career.

=== TenX Strategies and the Going Big! podcast ===
In July 2024, Gentry retired from both Stand Together and Koch to launch TenX Strategies. TenX Strategies states its mission is to help "great causes transform their effectiveness by 10xing their fundraising." As part of TenX Strategies, he also launched the Going Big! podcast, which features business leaders, nonprofit leaders, and philanthropists to share their stories of making a significant impact in their given fields. The podcast has won MarCom Gold, Viddy Gold, and Communicator awards for excellence in storytelling and has featured guests including Newt Gingrich, Doug DeVos, Will Guidara, Phil Gramm, Richard Viguerie, Morton Blackwell, and Lord Matthew Elliott.

== Affiliations ==
Gentry serves on the board of directors of Bethany Christian Services of Virginia and the Virginia Future Business Leaders Foundation. He is a member of the Council for National Policy, a networking group for social conservative activists. He serves as a board member of the Direct Marketing Association of Washington. Gentry also served on Virginia Governor Bob McDonnell's government reform advisory committee.
