= Robert Hurt (politician) =

Virginia politician (born 1969)

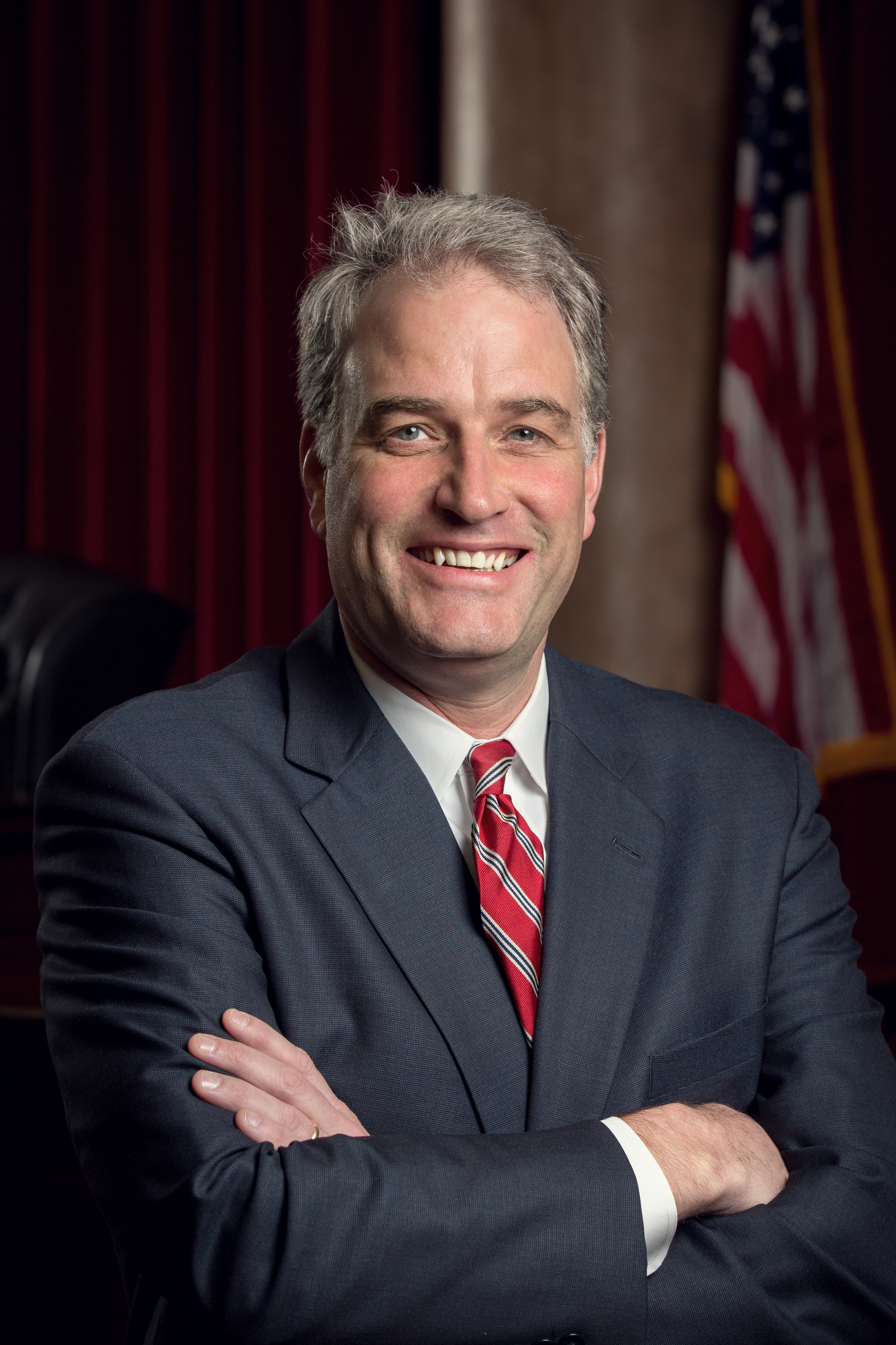

Member of the U.S. House of Representatives from Virginia's 5th district
- In office January 3, 2011 – January 3, 2017
- Preceded by: Tom Perriello
- Succeeded by: Tom Garrett

Member of the Virginia Senate from the 19th district
- In office January 9, 2008 – January 3, 2011
- Preceded by: Charles R. Hawkins
- Succeeded by: Bill Stanley

Member of the Virginia House of Delegates from the 16th district
- In office January 2002 – January 9, 2008
- Preceded by: Chip Woodrum
- Succeeded by: Donald Merricks

Personal details
- Born: June 16, 1969 (age 57) New York City, New York, U.S.
- Party: Republican
- Relatives: Charles Hurt (brother)
- Education: Hampden-Sydney College (BS); Mississippi College (JD)

Robert Hurt (born June 16, 1969) is an American attorney and politician who served as the U.S. representative for Virginia's 5th congressional district from 2011 to 2017, where he served on the Financial Services Committee as vice chair of the Capital Markets Subcommittee and Housing and Insurance Subcommittee.

After 16 years in public office, Hurt stepped down from Congress in January 2017 and was invited to Liberty University to work as vice president and founding director of Liberty's Center for Law and Government. In 2019, Hurt was asked to concurrently work as dean of the Helms School of Government at Liberty University.

Prior to representing Virginia's 5th district, Hurt practiced law and served as a citizen-legislator from Southside Virginia, representing Virginia's 19th Senate District for three years and Virginia's 16th House of Delegates District for six years. Prior to his election to the Virginia General Assembly in 2001, Hurt served on the Chatham Town Council and as chief assistant commonwealth's attorney for Pittsylvania County.

== Early life and education ==
Hurt was born in New York City, where he lived for about nine years. His father, Henry Hurt, was a journalist and editor for Reader's Digest. In 1986, Henry wrote a book questioning the findings of the Warren Commission called Reasonable Doubt: An Investigation into the Assassination of John F. Kennedy. Hurt was raised in Chatham, Virginia, attended Hargrave Military Academy and graduated from Episcopal High School in Alexandria. He earned a bachelor's degree in English from Hampden–Sydney College in 1991 and a J.D. degree from Mississippi College School of Law in 1995. Hurt also graduated from the Sorensen Institute for Political Leadership program in 2000.

== Career ==
He served as a chief assistant Commonwealth's Attorney for Pittsylvania County from 1996 to 1999. From 1999 to 2008, Hurt worked in a general law practice with the firm of H. Victor Millner Jr. P.C. in Chatham. In 2008, Hurt opened up his own law practice in Chatham. Hurt is a member of Kappa Sigma fraternity.

Hurt began his political career as a member of the Chatham Town Council. He was elected with 82 percent of the vote. Hurt was first elected to the House of Delegates in 2001 and served three terms. He represented the 16th District, which includes part of Pittsylvania County. He was elected and re-elected to the House of Delegates with at least 62 percent of the vote. He cited bringing the New College Institute and the Virginia Museum of Natural History as accomplishments that he and other legislators of both parties have worked together to bring to the area.

During his time as a delegate, Hurt worked to increase state funding for K-12 education and increase the safety of Virginia's children through membership on the Courts of Justice Committee and the Youth Internet Safety Taskforce. Hurt voted two dozen times to cut taxes and supported 28 bills in the General Assembly that sought to reduce taxes on food, gas, cigarettes, cars, real estate, computer sales and other items. In 2004, Hurt voted in favor of a $1.4 billion tax increase to narrow the gap in Virginia's budget. Hurt stated that the increase was essential, based on the information lawmakers had at the time, to refrain from a government shutdown over a budget impasse and has since stated regret over the vote.

In November 2007, Hurt was elected to the Senate of Virginia, winning 75 percent of the vote. Hurt represented the 19th district, which includes the city of Danville, all of Pittsylvania and Franklin counties, and part of Campbell county.

== U.S. House of Representatives ==
=== Elections ===
==== 2010 ====
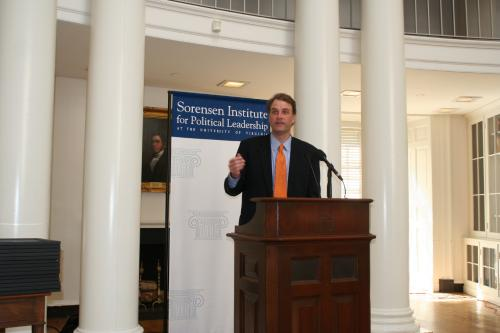
Hurt speaks at the Sorensen Institute for Political Leadership at the University of Virginia

On October 7, 2009, Hurt officially declared himself a candidate for Virginia's 5th congressional district. The district stretches from Charlottesville to Southside Virginia and west to Bedford and Franklin counties. Hurt was the Republican establishment candidate in the primary and was not received well by the Tea Party. On June 8, 2010, Hurt won the Republican nomination with a plurality in a crowded field of six other candidates. All of Hurt's opponents in the primary endorsed him. A local Tea Party Leader said his group would "unite behind" and "support" Hurt.

Hurt campaigned against Democratic incumbent Tom Perriello and Independent candidate Jeffrey Clark in the general election. Republicans viewed his as a pickup opportunity and poured resources into the race. Perriello was listed as one of the 10 most vulnerable House incumbents by Roll Call. Hurt was a member of the National Republican Congressional Committee's "Young Guns" program.

On June 12, Hurt stated that he would "absolutely" participate in debates that included all the candidates, including Independent candidate Clark. Just days later, Hurt stated that he would not debate Clark. Although the statement was made in response to a direct query from a reporter as to whether he would debate Clark, Hurt's campaign later tried to justify their position by insisting this was untrue. Hurt skipped the first debate which was organized by the Senior Statesmen of Virginia, becoming the first candidate to skip the forum since it started in 1996. In addition to the first debate, Hurt skipped two subsequent debates one sponsored by the Chamber of Commerce in Nelson County and another hosted by American Legion Post 325 in Danville making a total of three skipped debates.

Hurt campaigned on his opposition to the Democratic-backed initiatives that Perriello supported, such as health-care reform, the economic stimulus package and clean energy legislation. On August 20, Hurt released his first television ad. The ad stated that he would fight tax increases, stop Washington's spending and start creating jobs, however he never mentioned his opponents. "You definitely see that he's running against Congress as a whole and Democrats as a whole," Isaac Wood, an analyst at the University of Virginia Center for Politics, said. "That was very clear. He spent just a few seconds introducing himself, then pivoted right away to attack the negative things happening in D.C. With voters, that can be effective." Another ad from Hurt called Perriello a "rubber stamp" for the policies of President Barack Obama and House Speaker Nancy Pelosi. Hurt won with 51 percent of the vote. He became the first freshman Republican to represent this district since Reconstruction. Virgil Goode, who represented the district from 1997 to 2009, was originally elected as a Democrat, and only joined the GOP in 2002 after serving as an independent from 2000 to 2002.

==== 2012 ====
Hurt was challenged by Democratic nominee John Douglass, a retired United States Air Force Brigadier General and former Assistant Secretary of the Navy. Hurt won re-election to a second term on November 6, 2012.

==== 2014 ====
Hurt was re-elected to a third term in 2014, defeating Democratic nominee Lawrence Gaughan 61% to 36%.

=== Tenure ===
After his win, Hurt submitted a formal letter of resignation from the Virginia General Assembly to Governor Bob McDonnell that would be effective on January 5, the day Hurt was sworn into Congress. Hurt voted to repeal the Patient Protection and Affordable Care Act which successfully passed the House. In February, Hurt criticized President Barack Obama's $3.73 trillion 2012 federal budget proposal for its excessive spending and borrowing. Hurt would vote to pass a $1.2 trillion bill that would cut the year's budget federal budget by $61 billion. On April 8, Hurt voted for a continuing resolution that prevented the government from shutting down that day. Hurt expressed support for Paul Ryan's budget plan that month as well. On July 19, Hurt voted for the Cut, Cap and Balance Act. On August 1, Hurt voted for the Budget Control Act of 2011 that raised the debt ceiling and cut spending by $2.1 trillion over the next 10 years. Hurt co-sponsored a bill that would prevent the Environmental Protection Agency from cracking down on farm dust. The bill passed the House on December 8.

In 2010, when Hurt was running against incumbent Tom Perriello, the Sierra Club and League of Conservation Voters released television and radio ads against Hurt, attacking him on an alleged conflict of interest regarding uranium mining, because his father was a founding investor in Virginia Uranium and Hurt had accepted money from uranium mining interests. Hurt strongly opposed House Speaker Nancy Pelosi's 2009 proposed "Cap-and Trade" climate control legislation.

Hurt opposed the Affordable Care Act, saying "The President's health care law represents a fundamental departure from the founding principles of our nation by placing more faith in government than in the American people and by inserting the federal government in between patients and their doctors."

=== Committee assignments ===
- Committee on Financial Services
  - Subcommittee on Capital Markets and Government-Sponsored Enterprises
  - Subcommittee on Insurance, Housing and Community Opportunity (Vice Chair)

=== Retirement ===
Hurt did not seek re-election to the U.S. House in 2016. He was succeeded by fellow Republican Tom Garrett.

== Electoral history ==
Virginia House of Delegates, District 16: Results 2001 to 2005
Year	Republican	Votes	Pct	Democratic	Votes	Pct	Third Party	Party	Votes	Pct
2001	Robert Hurt	11,853	65%	Randy Collins	6,382	35%				
2003	Robert Hurt	8,744	62%	Kimble Reynolds, Jr.	5,441	38%				
2005	Robert Hurt	12,821	99%	no candidate			Write-ins		123	1%

Virginia Senate, District 19: Results 2007
Year	Republican	Votes	Pct	Third Party	Party	Votes	Pct
2007	Robert Hurt	29,735	76%	Sherman Witcher	Independent	9,488	24%

Virginia's 5th congressional district: Results 2010, 2012, and 2014
Year	Republican	Votes	Pct	Democratic	Votes	Pct	Third Party	Party	Votes	Pct
2010	Robert Hurt	119,560	51%	Tom Perriello	110,562	47%	Jeffrey Clark	Independent	4,992	2%
2012	Robert Hurt	193,009	55%	John Douglass	149,214	43%	Kenneth J. Hildebrandt	Independent Green	5,500	2%
2014	Robert Hurt	124,735	60.9%	Lawrence Gaughan	73,482	35.9%	Kenneth J. Hildebrandt	Independent Green	2,209	1.1%

== Career after Congress ==
In 2018, Hurt sought to be nominated as a U.S. District Judge for the United States District Court for the Western District of Virginia. The nomination went to U.S. Attorney Thomas T. Cullen, who was confirmed on September 10, 2020. From 2017 to 2023, Hurt served as the Dean at the Helms School of Government at Liberty University. He left to serve as general counsel at a Virginia-based healthcare data analytics firm.

== Personal life and family ==
Hurt lives in Chatham. Hurt is a member of Chatham Presbyterian Church and Chatham Rotary Club. Also, he is a member of the Board of Directors of the New College Institute, the Virginia Bar Association's Board of Governors, the Hampden-Sydney Wilson Center Advisory Board, the John Marshall Foundation Board, the Board of Directors of Roman Eagle Nursing Home and the board of directors of the W. E. Skelton 4-H Conference Center at Smith Mountain Lake. His brother, Charles Hurt, is a journalist and political columnist for the Washington Times. Hurt gave the commencement address at Piedmont Virginia Community College in May 2011.

U.S. House of Representatives
Preceded by Tom Perriello	Member of the U.S. House of Representatives from Virginia's 5th congressional district 2011–2017	Succeeded by Tom Garrett
U.S. order of precedence (ceremonial)
Preceded by Mick Mulvaney as Former U.S. Representative	Order of precedence of the United States as Former U.S. Representative	Succeeded by Scott Rigell as Former U.S. Representative
