= Scott Rigell =

American politician (born 1960)

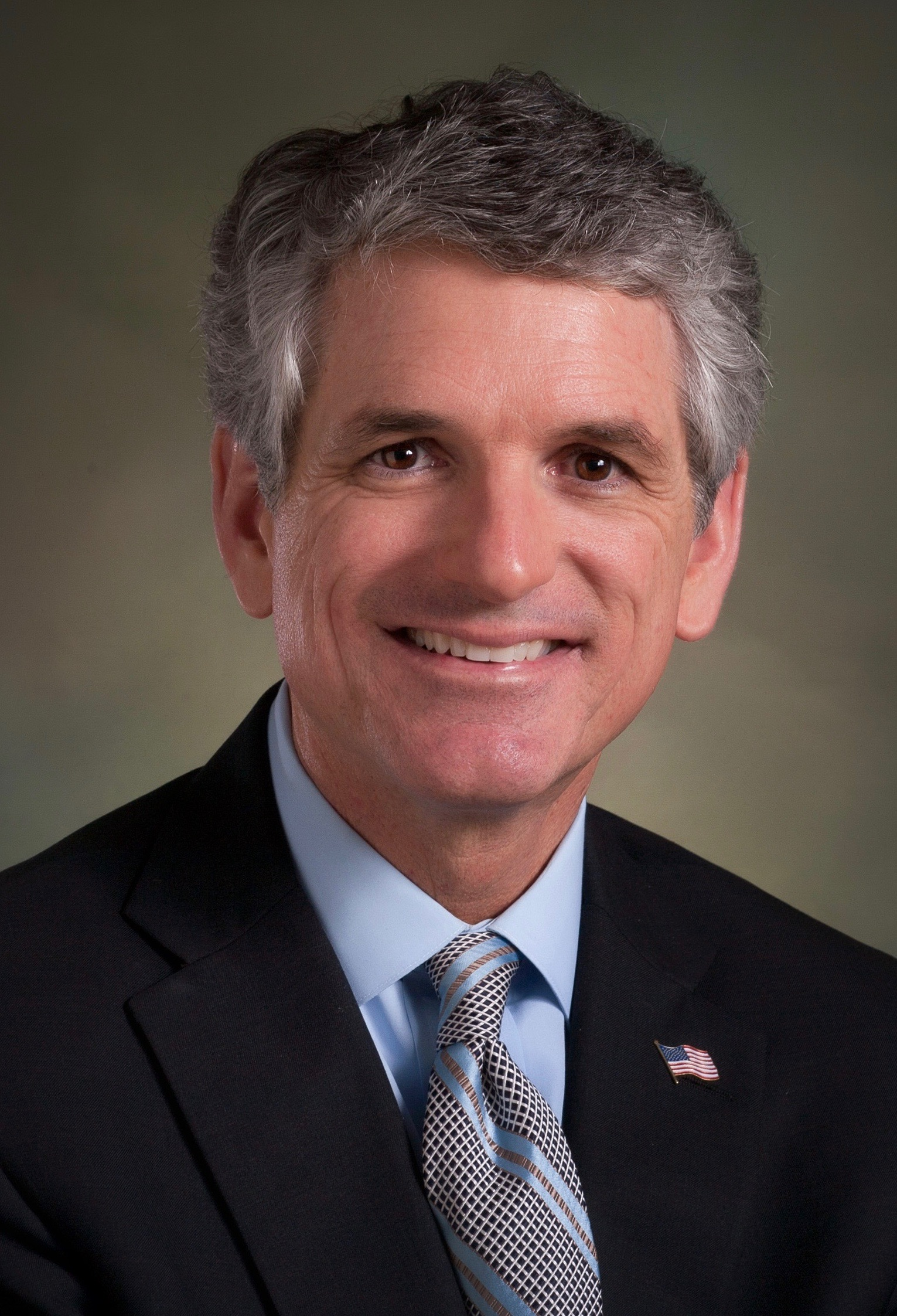
- Official portrait, 2011

Member of the U.S. House of Representatives from Virginia's 2nd district
- In office January 3, 2011 – January 3, 2017
- Preceded by: Glenn Nye
- Succeeded by: Scott Taylor

Personal details
- Born: Edward Scott Rigell; May 28, 1960 (age 66) Titusville, Florida, U.S.
- Party: Republican
- Spouse: Deborah Horan
- Children: 4
- Education: Eastern Florida State College (AA); Mercer University (BBA); Regent University (MBA)

Military service
- Branch/service: United States Marine Corps
- Years of service: 1978–1984
- Rank: Sergeant
- Unit: United States Marine Corps Reserve

Edward Scott Rigell (born May 28, 1960) is an American businessman and politician who served as the U.S. representative for Virginia's 2nd congressional district from 2011 to 2017. He declined to run for re-election in 2016, and he left office in January 2017. Rigell is the last representative from this district who did not serve in the United States Navy.

A Republican, Rigell broke with the party establishment in August 2016, withdrawing his support for Donald Trump, the then-Republican nominee for President, endorsing Libertarian nominee Gary Johnson. Rigell has been characterized as a "Never Trump" Republican.

== Early life and education ==
Rigell was raised in Titusville, Florida. He served for six years in the United States Marine Corps Reserve from 1978 to 1984, attaining the rank of Sergeant. His father served in the Marines in World War II, landing on Iwo Jima, and his son is a Marine. He holds an A.A. from Brevard Community College, a BBA from Mercer University, and a M.B.A. from Regent University.

== Career ==
Prior to his election to Congress, Rigell and his former wife Teri established, and continue to own, two new car dealerships under the name Freedom Automotive, one in Norfolk and the other in Chesapeake/Virginia Beach.

== U.S. House of Representatives ==
=== Elections ===
==== 2010 ====
Rigell won the Republican nomination in a six-way race, defeating Bert Mizusawa. The Hill rated his primary race as one of the top seven Congressional primaries for that election cycle. Rigell was considered by many to be the favorite in the primary, because he had support from the National Republican Congressional Committee and Eric Cantor – at least after the primary, and was endorsed by Republican Virginia governor Bob McDonnell.

Rigell came under attack from his primary opponents for the dealerships he owns having sold 138 cars under the Cash for Clunkers program, which Rigell subsequently criticized as "reckless bailouts and an out-of-control federal debt." Rigell noted that buyers, not dealers, received program subsidies for trading up to a more fuel-efficient vehicle. A spokesman said that Rigell felt "an obligation to the people who work for him, and his customers." He also came under attack for making campaign contributions to Barack Obama during the 2008 Democratic primaries and to Virginia Democrat Louise Lucas in her bid against Randy Forbes. Rigell said he believed that Hillary Clinton would have been a worse option for president.

Rigell states that his top priority is reducing government spending and that he supports replacing the health care law with market-based reforms. As of June 4, 2010, Rigell had contributed $775,000 of his personal wealth to his campaign. Rigell defeated Democratic incumbent Glenn Nye for Virginia's 2nd congressional district.

==== 2012 ====
Rigell was challenged by businessman and Democratic nominee Paul Hirschbiel.

==== 2014 ====
Rigell was challenged by Democrat Suzanne Patrick in the general election.

Rigell said he will focus on economic issues over social issues in the 2014 election. He stated, "I wake up every day not thinking about the social issues. I sought office because I know we can do better on job creation and I'm also concerned about our fiscal trajectory." He added, "I think as part of that we're strengthening things that are important to women and, of course, to men as well. Early childhood education, making sure that our children are safe and they have great opportunities once they get out of high school or college."

==== 2016 ====
Rigell announced in January 2016 that he would not run for re-election in 2016.

=== Tenure and political positions ===
Rigell took office in January 2011 as part of the largest Republican House majority since the 1940s.

In June 2012, Rigell was one of only two Republicans (along with Steven LaTourette of Ohio) who voted against a motion to hold Attorney General Eric Holder in contempt of Congress for his handling of the ATF gunwalking scandal. Billionaire Warren Buffett challenged the GOP that he would match any donations to the Treasury they give. Rigell had already been giving back 15% of his salary, and when he flagged this for Buffett, Buffett agreed to match it.

==== Social issues ====
Rigell states he is "proudly pro-life", he opposes gay marriage and opposed the repeal of "Don't Ask, Don't Tell." In 2011, Rigell cosponsored bills to prohibit abortion coverage under the national Affordable Health Care law, prohibit the use of federal funds for Planned Parenthood and prohibit taxpayer funding of abortion. Rigell voted for reauthorization of the Violence Against Women Act. Rigell has refused to endorse Republican candidate for Lieutenant Governor E.W. Jackson in light of anti-gay comments made by Jackson.

==== Military and foreign policy ====
Rigell's district includes the largest concentration of active duty and retired service members in the United States. He supported the Veterans' Compensation Cost-of-Living Adjustment (COLA) Act, which the House and Senate passed. This bill increased the rate of compensation for veterans who were disabled in active duty. Rigell supports the continued military effort in Afghanistan; he opposed a vote in 2011 to remove troops from the country. However, he also opposed deploying ground troops to Libya, and has joined a bipartisan coalition urging President Obama and Congress to resist "calls for a 'quick' and 'easy' military intervention in Iraq.".

In 2011, Rigell called the President's use of force in Libya 'unconstitutional,' stating that the military action violated the War Powers Resolution of 1973 since Congress was not consulted. Rigell simultaneously introduced an amendment to the Department of Defense FY'12 Appropriations bill to defund U.S. military operations in Libya, but the amendment failed in the House.

In 2013, following an alleged chemical attack by the Assad Regime in Syria, Rigell wrote a letter to the President urging him to consult Congress, as prescribed by the War Powers Resolution, before authorizing the use of any military force overseas. He was joined by 139 Members of the House of Representatives, 21 of whom were Democrats.

Rigell also supported a bipartisan congressional resolution advocating for the United Nations (UN) to create a Syrian War Crimes Tribunal. The bipartisan resolution, introduced by Representative Chris Smith of New Jersey, called for an immediate ceasefire in Syria and directed the President to work with the UN to set up a tribunal to investigate war crimes committed by both the Syrian government and rebel groups in the country.

==== Budget ====
Rigell supported Paul Ryan's budget plan, Path to Prosperity, which called for repeal of the 2010 Healthcare legislation. He vocally criticized Senate inaction on the House's budget plans in 2011, stating "Empirically we can show that the bottleneck is in the Senate – I hope every American stands up and says to Senator Reid: get these bills passed, we'll go to conference, let's work it out, we'll work weekends and get this thing moving again." Ultimately, he voted in favor of S 627, the 2011 budget proposal which raised the debt ceiling and required a supercommittee to provide more concrete spending cuts.

==== Opposition to Donald Trump ====
During the 2016 Republican presidential primary process, Rigell strongly opposed the candidacy of Donald Trump, writing in March 2016 that he was a "con man" and a "bully" whose potential presidency would be "reckless, embarrassing and ultimately dangerous", and that he would not support Trump if he became the nominee. Rigell reiterated his concerns in August 2016, saying Trump and Democratic nominee Hillary Clinton were "equally unworthy" of the presidency, and endorsed Libertarian Party nominee Gary Johnson.

The week after he endorsed Johnson, Rigell resigned from the Virginia Beach Republican Party. In a statement about his resignation, Rigell's spokesman said, "Because Scott refuses to support his party's current nominee for President, the local committee was expected to revoke Congressman Rigell's membership. Knowing that, Congressman Rigell resigned from the Virginia Beach Republican Party. While he is no longer a member of his local party unit, he remains a member of the Republican Party."

Rigell signed an August 2016 letter to the Republican National Committee from over 100 Republicans urging the RNC to suspend its support for Trump's campaign and to spend its resources on congressional Republicans.

=== Committee assignments ===
- Committee on Appropriations
  - Subcommittee on Financial Services and General Government
  - Subcommittee on Labor, Health and Human Services, Education, and Related Agencies
  - Subcommittee on the Legislative Branch

=== Caucus memberships ===
- Congressional Constitution Caucus

== Personal life ==
He married Deborah Horan in September 2023.

== Electoral history ==
2010 Republican Primary, 2nd Congressional District
Party	Candidate	Votes	%
Republican	Scott Rigell	14,396	39.50%
Republican	Ben Loyola, Jr.	9,762	26.78%
Republican	Bert Mizusawa	6,342	17.40%
Republican	Scott W. Taylor	2,950	8.09%
Republican	Jessica Sandlin	1,620	4.44%
Republican	Ed Maulbeck	1,372	3.76%
Total votes		309,222	100%

2010 General election, 2nd Congressional District
Party	Candidate	Votes	%
Republican	Scott Rigell	88,340	53.12%
Democratic	Glenn Nye	70,591	42.45%
Independent	Kenny Golden	7,194	4.32%
Independent	Write-in candidates	164	0.09%
Total votes		166,289	100%

2012 General election, 2nd Congressional District
Party	Candidate	Votes	%
Republican	Scott Rigell	166,231	53.75%
Democratic	Paul Hirschbiel	142,548	46.09%
Independent	Write-in candidates	443	0.14%
Total votes		309,222	100%

2014 General election, 2nd Congressional District
Party	Candidate	Votes	%
Republican	Scott Rigell	101,558	58.68%
Democratic	Suzanne Patrick	71,178	41.12%
Independent	Write-in candidates	324	0.18%
Total votes		173,060	100%

U.S. House of Representatives
Preceded by Glenn Nye	Member of the U.S. House of Representatives from Virginia's 2nd congressional district 2011–2017	Succeeded by Scott Taylor
U.S. order of precedence (ceremonial)
Preceded by Robert Hurt as Former U.S. Representative	Order of precedence of the United States as Former U.S. Representative	Succeeded by Jennifer Wexton as Former U.S. Representative
