= National Association of Postal Supervisors =

Staff association group

The National Association of Postal Supervisors (NAPS) is a staff association representing people in managerial roles in the United States Postal Service.

== History ==
The association was founded on September 8, 1908, at a conference in Louisville, Kentucky, as the National Association of Supervisory Post Office Employees. It became NAPS in the early 1920s, and by 1925, it had 5,500 members.

In January 1946, the association was chartered by the American Federation of Labor (AFL), and by 1953, its membership had grown to 16,500. However, it resigned from the AFL in 1955, prior to that federation's merger into the AFL-CIO.

As of 2022, the association is based in Alexandria, Virginia, and claims 27,000 members.

== Presidents ==
1908: L. E. Palmer
1910: George A. Gassman
1911: Ernest Green
1916: William Sansom
1917: J. J. Fields
1921: V. C. Burke
1922: H. M. Tittle
1924: Peter Wigge
1925: Harry Folger
1930: W. Bruce Luna
1931: M. F. O'Donnell
1932: Herschel Ressler
1937: M. F. Fitzpatrick
1941: John J. Lane
1946: John McMahon
1950: Michael Nave
1958: Fred J. O'Dwyer
1970: Donald N. Ledbetter
1986: Rubin Handelman
1992: Vincent Palladino
2006: Ted Keating
2010: Louis M. Atkins
2016: Brian J. Wagner
2021: Ivan D. Butts
