= Lawrence Webb =

American politician

Member of the Falls Church City School Board
- Incumbent
- Assumed office November 2013

Chair of the Falls Church City School Board
- In office 2017–2018

Member of the Falls Church City Council
- In office 2008–2012

Personal details
- Born: Kenbridge, Virginia, U.S.
- Party: Democratic
- Domestic partner: Clifton Taylor
- Education: Shenandoah University (BA, Graduate Certificate)
- Occupation: Academic administrator, politician
- Known for: First openly gay African-American elected official in Virginia

Lawrence Webb is an academic administrator and former politician from Springfield, Virginia. He was elected in 2008 to the Falls Church City Council, becoming the first openly gay, African-American elected official in the Commonwealth of Virginia. He ran for re-election in 2012 lost. He was elected to the Falls Church City School Board in November 2013. Webb was selected by his fellow board members to serve as chair of the board in 2017. He ran and was re-elected in 2017 to the school board and was selected to serve a second year as chair of the board.

== Biography ==
Born in Kenbridge, Virginia, Webb earned a B.A. in Mass Communications and a graduate Certificate in Public Management from Shenandoah University, where he was the first African-American elected president of the Student Government Association. He interned at the Virginia State Senate Clerk's office and in two Capitol Hill offices, one with former Virginia Senator Chuck Robb.

Webb worked as an assistant director of admissions at the University of Mary Washington. Webb is currently the Coordinator of Graduate Admissions at Bowie State University. He was previously employed by Shenandoah University in the admissions and alumni affairs offices. He has worked with the James Farmer Scholars Program.

Former Governor Mark Warner appointed Webb to the School Board of the Department of Correctional Education in 2004, and rose to the chairmanship in 2010 a position he held until 2012. Webb was appointed in 2015 by Virginia Governor Terry McAuliffe to the Virginia Advisory Committee on Juvenile Justice and Prevention. A resident of Falls Church since 2004, Webb had served three years on the city's Recreation & Parks Advisory Board prior to his election to city council.

He lives with his partner Clifton Taylor. His candidacy was supported by the Gay & Lesbian Victory Fund. He is the first openly gay African American elected official in the commonwealth of Virginia.
