= Virginia's 87th House of Delegates district =

Virginia legislative district

District map from the 2023 election

Virginia's 87th House of Delegates district elects one of 100 seats in the Virginia House of Delegates, the lower house of the state's bicameral legislature. District 87 has been represented by Democrat Jeion Ward since 2024.

== Elections ==
In 2015, John Bell, an Air Force veteran, was elected by a margin of only 320 votes, so this district was considered vulnerable to turnover in 2017. Bell was challenged by the Republican Subba Kolla, who immigrated from India in the 1990s and became a citizen in 2008. Kolla has stated, "I believe that the government that governs least, governs best." Late in the race, both candidates had raised significant funds (Bell $627,000 to Kolla's $524,600 as of November 2, 2017), but Bell defeated Kolla 61.73% to 38.04%.

== District officeholders ==
Years	Delegate	Party	Electoral history
January 12, 1983 – January 10, 1996	Howard Copeland	Democratic	First elected in 1982
January 10, 1996 – January 3, 2005	Thelma Drake	Republican	Forced to resign; Elected to the US House of Representatives
January 3, 2005 – January 11, 2012	Paula Miller	Democratic	Redistricted out; Unable to run for reelection
January 11, 2012 – January 5, 2016	David Ramadan	Republican	First elected in 2011; Later retired in 2015
January 13, 2016 – January 8, 2020	John Bell	Democratic	First elected in 2015; Elected to the Virginia State Senate in 2019
January 8, 2020 – January 10, 2024	Suhas Subramanyam	Democratic	First elected in 2019; Elected to the Virginia State Senate in 2023
January 10, 2024 – present	Jeion Ward	Democratic	Redistricted into the 87th district; Re-elected in 2023

== Elections ==
Virginia's 87th House of Delegates district election, 2015
Party	Candidate	Votes	%	±%
Democratic	John Bell (inc.)	8,203	49.87%	
Republican	Chuong Dong Nguyen	7,883	47.92	
Libertarian	Brian Suojanen	343	2.08	
Write-ins		18	.10%	
Turnout		16,447		
Democratic gain from Republican		Swing		
