= 2010 United States House of Representatives elections in Virginia =

- November 2, 2010

All 11 Virginia seats to the United States House of Representatives
	Majority party	Minority party
Party	Republican	Democratic
Last election	5 seats, 45.51%	6 seats, 53.01%
Seats before	5	6
Seats won	8	3
Seat change	▲3	▼3
Popular vote	1,183,842	898,832
Percentage	54.16%	41.61%
Swing	▲8.65%	▼11.40%

Republican
40–50%
50–60%
60–70%
70–80%
80–90%
Democratic
40–50%
50–60%
60–70%
70–80%

The 2010 congressional elections in Virginia were held November 2, 2010, to determine who will represent the state of Virginia in the United States House of Representatives. Representatives are elected for two-year terms; those elected served in the 112th Congress from January 2011 until January 2013.

Primary elections were held on June 9, 2010. After a poor showing in 2008, the Republican Party made significant gains and defeated three Democratic incumbents. Republicans would go onto hold a majority of House districts in Virginia until 2018.

== Overview ==
=== Statewide ===
Party	Candidates	Votes		Seats		
Party	Candidates	No.	%	No.	+/–	%
Republican	11	1,186,098	54.16	8	▲3	71.43
Democratic	10	911,116	41.61	3	▼3	28.57
Independents	6	42,002	1.92	0	Steady	0.0
Libertarian	4	23,681	1.08	0	Steady	0.0
Independent Greens	4	21,374	0.98	0	Steady	0.0
Write-in	11	5,570	0.25	0	Steady	0.0
Total	46	2,189,841	100.0	11	Steady	100.0

Popular vote
Republican	54.16%
Democratic	41.61%
Libertarian	1.08%
Independent Greens	0.98%
Other	2.17%

House seats
Republican	72.73%
Democratic	27.27%

=== By district ===
Results of the 2010 United States House of Representatives elections in Virginia by district:

District	Republican		Democratic		Others		Total		Result
District	Votes	%	Votes	%	Votes	%	Votes	%	Result
District 1	135,564	63.88%	73,824	34.78%	2,848	1.34%	212,236	100.0%	Republican hold
District 2	88,340	53.12%	70,591	42.45%	7,358	4.43%	166,289	100.0%	Republican gain
District 3	44,553	27.18%	114,754	70.02%	4,593	2.80%	163,900	100.0%	Democratic hold
District 4	123,659	62.33%	74,298	37.45%	432	0.22%	198,389	100.0%	Republican hold
District 5	119,560	50.81%	110,562	46.99%	5,177	2.20%	235,299	100.0%	Republican gain
District 6	127,487	76.27%	0	0.00%	39,667	23.73%	167,154	100.0%	Republican hold
District 7	138,209	59.22%	79,616	34.11%	15,577	6.67%	233,402	100.0%	Republican hold
District 8	71,145	37.30%	116,404	61.02%	3,199	1.68%	190,748	100.0%	Democratic hold
District 9	95,726	51.21%	86,743	46.41%	4,448	2.38%	186,917	100.0%	Republican gain
District 10	131,116	62.87%	72,604	34.81%	4,836	2.32%	208,556	100.0%	Republican hold
District 11	110,739	48.79%	111,720	49.23%	4,492	1.98%	226,951	100.0%	Democratic hold
Total	1,186,098	54.16%	911,116	41.61%	92,627	4.23%	2,189,841	100.0%	

== District 1 ==
2010 Virginia's 1st congressional district election
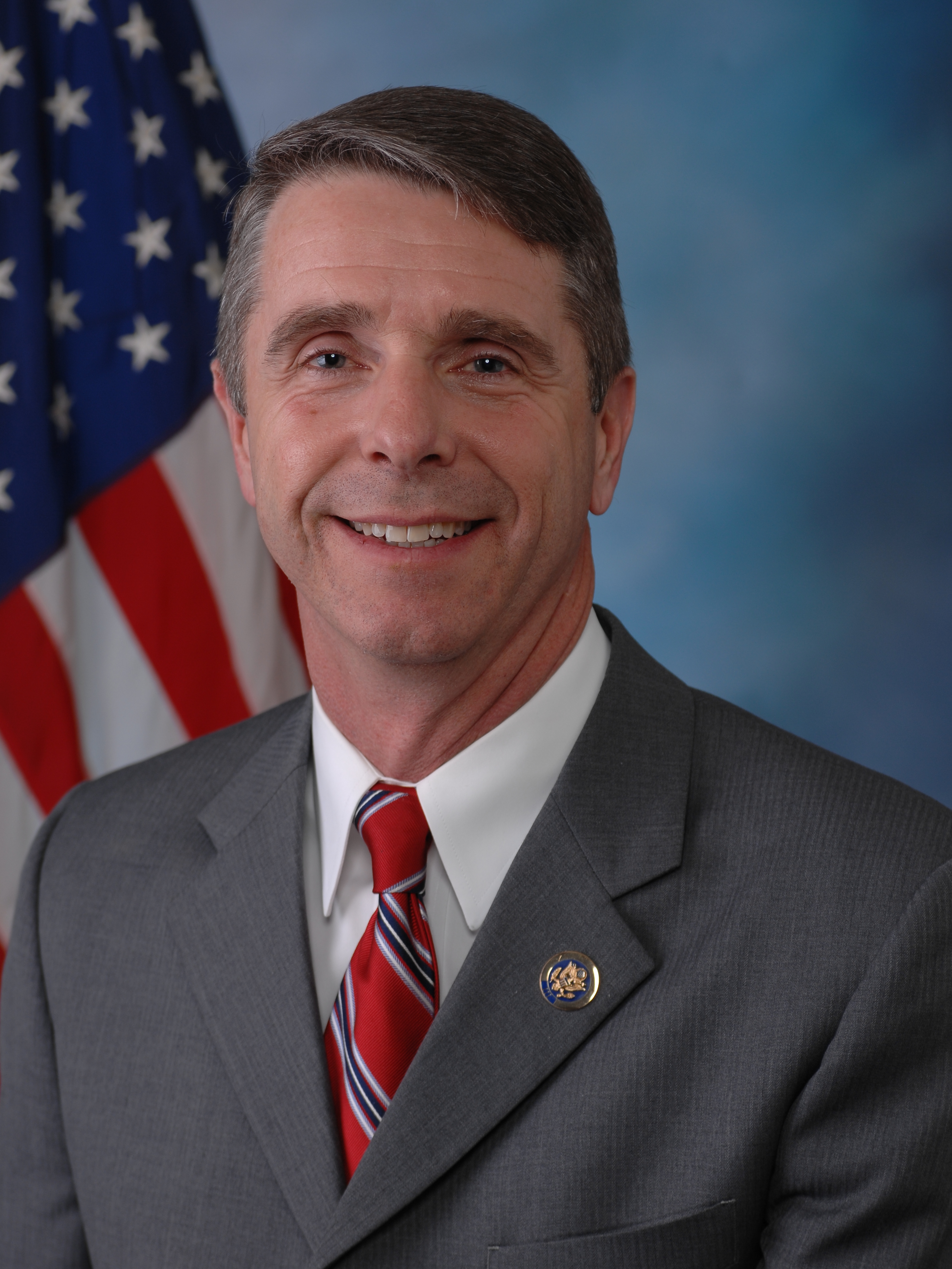

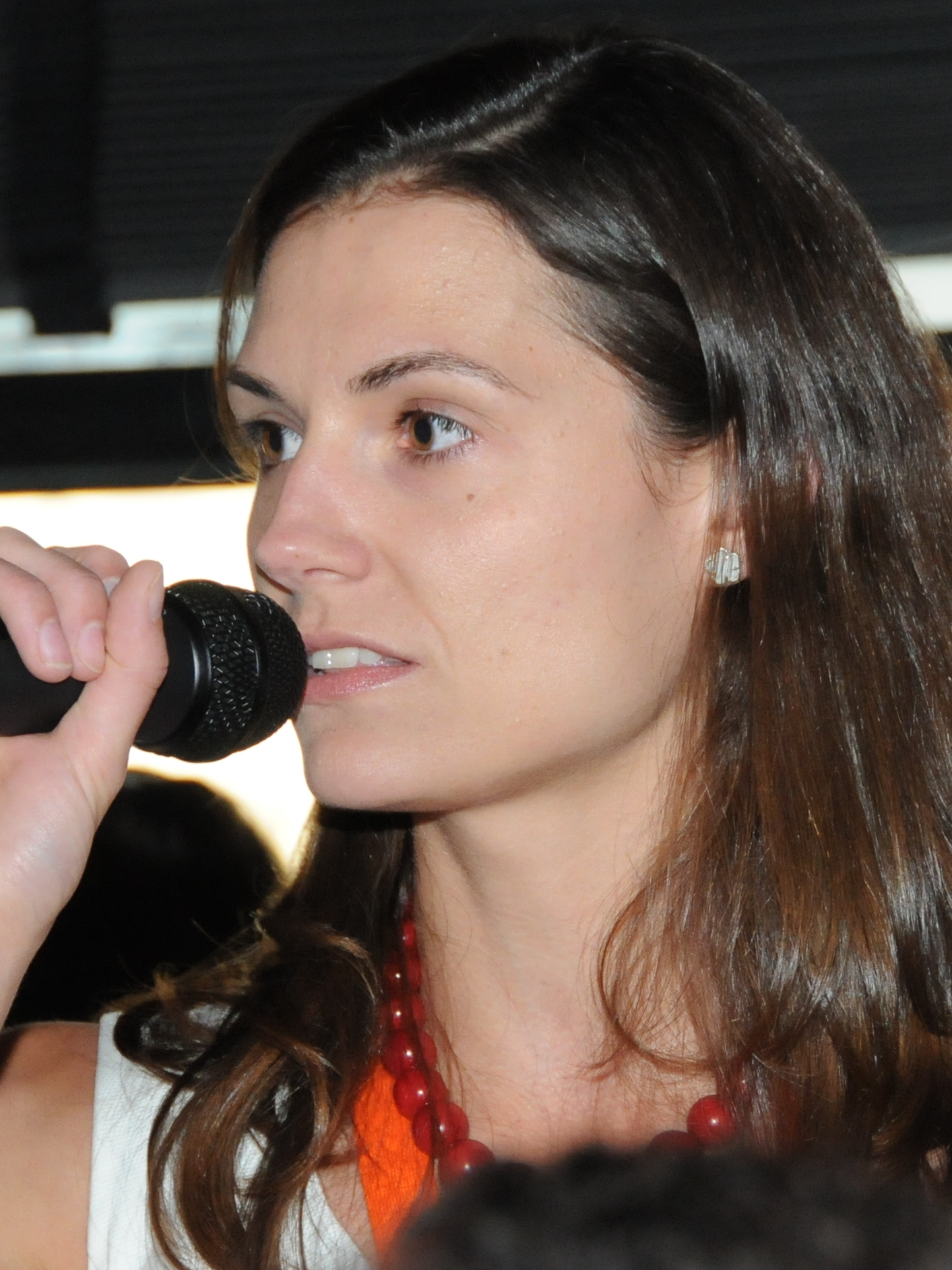
Nominee	Rob Wittman	Krystal Ball
Party	Republican	Democratic
Popular vote	135,564	73,824
Percentage	63.87%	34.78%
- County and independent city results Wittman: 50–60% 60–70% 70–80% 80–90% Ball: 50–60%
U.S. Representative before election
Rob Wittman
Republican
Elected U.S. Representative
Rob Wittman
Republican

Incumbent Republican Rob Wittman, who had represented the district since 2007, ran for re-election. He was re–elected with 56.6% of the vote in 2008 and the district had a PVI of R+7.

=== Republican primary ===
==== Campaign ====
In the Republican primary, Wittman was challenged by self-described Tea Party movement member Catherine Crabill. Crabill's candidacy had been controversial due to her statements that the Second Amendment to the U.S. Constitution was intended to help citizens protect themselves from tyranny. and that citizens may have to turn from the ballot box to the bullet box.

In 2009, Wittman and Virginia Governor Bob McDonnell had refused to endorse her for the Virginia House of Delegates. McDonnell spokesman Tucker Martin stated, "It's absolutely wrong for any candidate of any party to refer to the actions of the President of the United States and members of the United States Congress as 'domestic terrorism,' and to threaten to resort to violence if one fails to prevail in elections." Crabill refused to retract her remarks, saying "Those are my convictions." Wittman voted against the Emergency Economic Stabilization Act of 2008 during the financial crisis, against economic stimulus packages, and against the Health Care and Education Reconciliation Act of 2010, so had been deemed by some commentators to be difficult to get to the right of, but there was also deemed to be good reason for Wittman to worry about the primary's outcome, given the anti-government mood of the country.

==== Candidates ====
===== Nominee =====
- Rob Wittman, incumbent U.S. Representative

===== Eliminated in primary =====
- Catherine Crabill, realtor and Tea Party activist

==== Results ====
Wittman easily defeated Crabill.

Republican primary results
Party	Candidate	Votes	%
Republican	Rob Wittman (incumbent)	28,956	87.96
Republican	Catherine Crabill	3,963	12.04
Total votes		32,919	100.0

=== Democratic primary ===
==== Candidates ====
===== Nominee =====
- Krystal Ball, accountant and businesswoman

=== Independent Greens primary ===
==== Candidates ====
===== Nominee =====
- Gail Parker (campaign site, PVS), businesswoman, retired U.S. Air Force officer, and Vice Chair of the Independent Green Party of Virginia

=== General election ===
==== Predictions ====
Source	Ranking	As of
The Cook Political Report	Safe R	November 1, 2010
Rothenberg	Safe R	November 1, 2010
Sabato's Crystal Ball	Safe R	November 1, 2010
RCP	Safe R	November 1, 2010
CQ Politics	Safe R	October 28, 2010
New York Times	Safe R	November 1, 2010
FiveThirtyEight	Safe R	November 1, 2010

==== Results ====
Virginia's 1st congressional district election, 2010
Party	Candidate	Votes	%
Republican	Rob Wittman (incumbent)	135,564	63.87
Democratic	Krystal Ball	73,824	34.78
Independent Greens	Gail Parker	2,544	1.19
Write-in		304	0.14
Majority		61,740	29.09
Total votes		212,236	100.0
Republican hold			

- VA - District 1 from OurCampaigns.com
- Race ranking and details from CQ Politics
- Campaign contributions from OpenSecrets
- Race profile at The New York Times

== District 2 ==
2010 Virginia's 2nd congressional district election
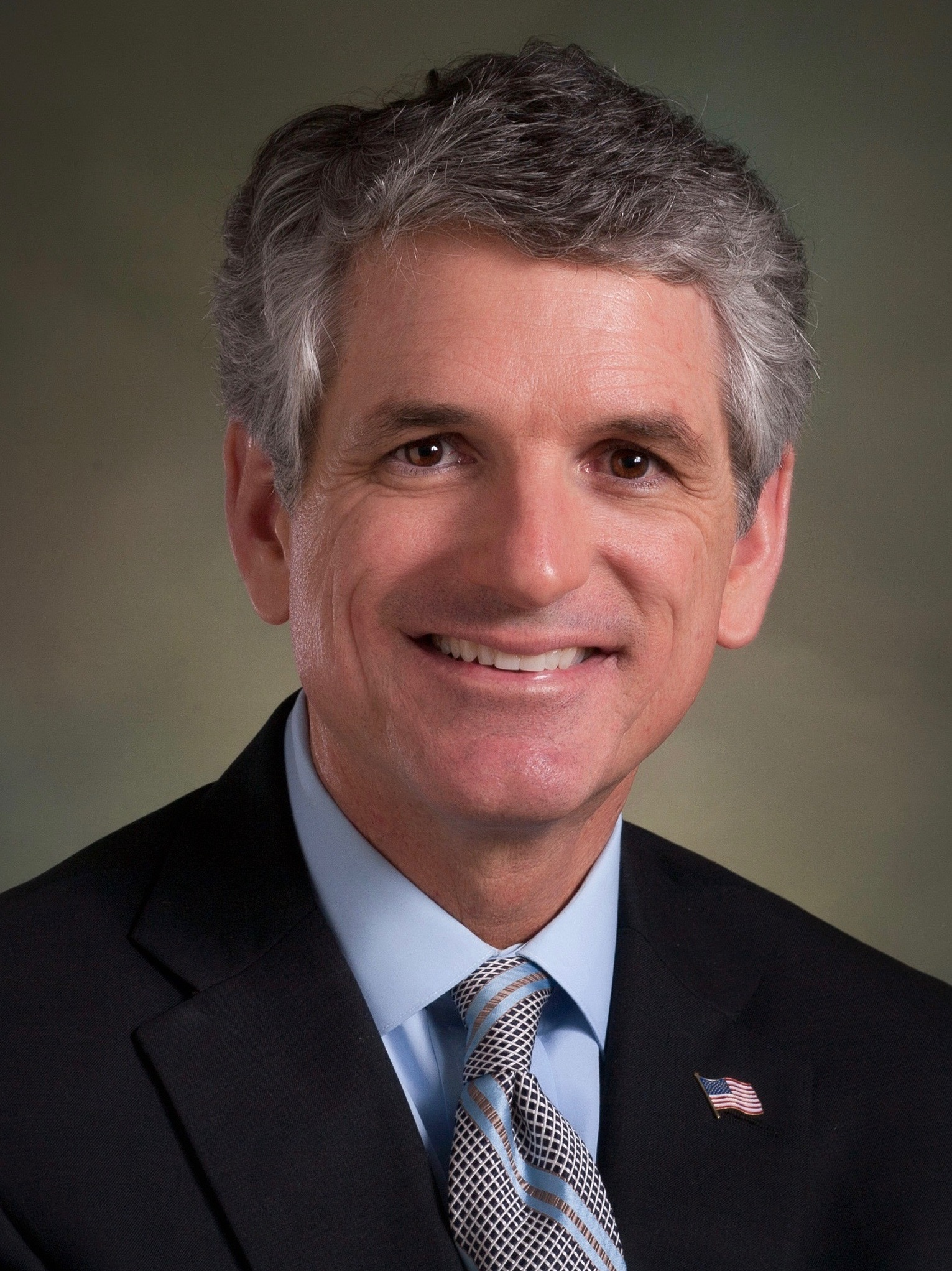

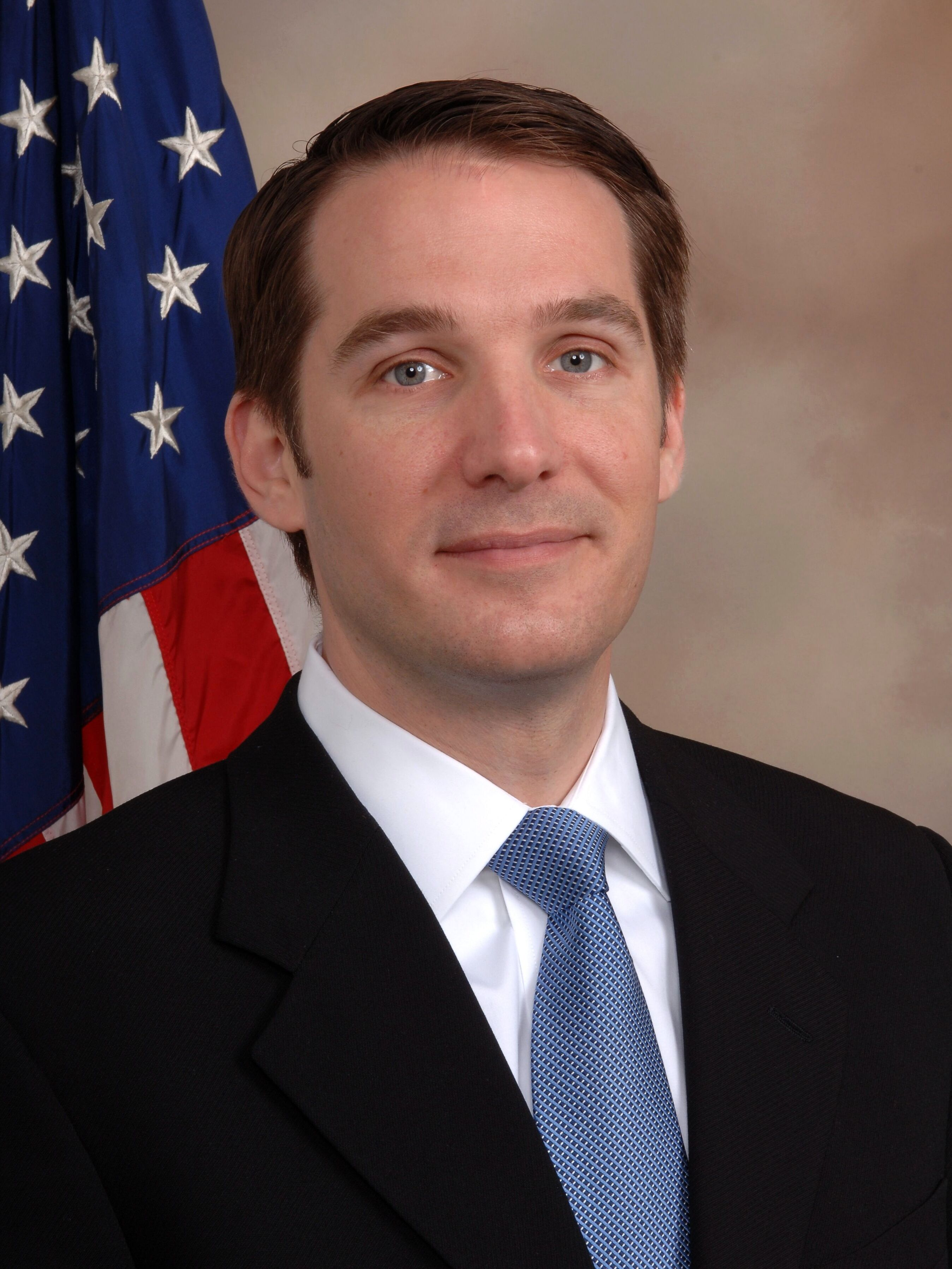
Nominee	Scott Rigell	Glenn Nye
Party	Republican	Democratic
Popular vote	88,340	70,591
Percentage	53.1%	42.5%
- County and independent city results Rigell: 40–50% 50–60% Nye: 50–60%
U.S. Representative before election
Glenn Nye
Democratic
Elected U.S. Representative
Scott Rigell
Republican

Incumbent Democratic Glenn Nye, who had represented the district since 2009, ran for re-election. He was elected with 52.4% of the vote in 2008 and the district had a PVI of R+5.

=== Democratic primary ===
==== Candidates ====
===== Nominee =====
- Glenn Nye, incumbent U.S. Representative

=== Republican primary ===
Ahead of the primary Bert Mizusawa had raised more money than any candidate in the last two periods, and was considered a frontrunner. Businessman Rigell was the other frontrunner, receiving major endorsements from Thelma Drake and Bob McDonnell's daughter.

==== Candidates ====
===== Nominee =====
- Scott Rigell, automotive executive and Marine Corps Reservist

===== Eliminated in primary =====
- Ben Loyola, businessman and naval reserve captain
- Ed Maulbeck, businessman and former Navy SEAL
- Bert Mizusawa, Army Brigadier General
- Jessica Sandlin, single mother of 5
- Scott Taylor, local business owner and former Navy SEAL

===== Withdrawn =====
- Kenny Golden, retired Navy Commodore and former chair of the Virginia Beach Republican Party (running as an independent)
- Chuck Smith, attorney and former Marine (endorsed Rigell, later ran in the 3rd district)

===== Declined =====
- Thelma Drake, former U.S. Representative
- Ken Stolle, state senator

==== Results ====
Republican primary results
Party	Candidate	Votes	%
Republican	Scott Rigell	14,396	39.5
Republican	Ben Loyola	9,762	26.8
Republican	Bert Mizusawa	6,342	17.4
Republican	Scott Taylor	2,950	8.1
Republican	Jessica Sandlin	1,620	4.4
Republican	Ed Maulbeck	1,372	3.8
Total votes		36,442	100.0

=== Other Candidates ===
- Kenny Golden, retired Navy Commodore and former chair of the Virginia Beach Republican Party (Independent)

=== General election ===
==== Predictions ====
Source	Ranking	As of
The Cook Political Report	Lean R (flip)	November 1, 2010
Rothenberg	Lean R (flip)	November 1, 2010
Sabato's Crystal Ball	Lean R (flip)	November 1, 2010
RCP	Lean R (flip)	November 1, 2010
CQ Politics	Tossup	October 28, 2010
New York Times	Lean R (flip)	November 1, 2010
FiveThirtyEight	Likely R (flip)	November 1, 2010

==== Results ====
Virginia's 2nd congressional district election, 2010
Party	Candidate	Votes	%
Republican	Scott Rigell	88,340	53.1
Democratic	Glenn Nye (incumbent)	70,591	42.5
Independent	Kenny Golden	7,194	4.3
Write-in		164	0.1
Majority		17,749	10.7
Total votes		166,289	100.0
Republican gain from Democratic			

- VA - District 2 from OurCampaigns.com
- Race ranking and details from CQ Politics
- Campaign contributions from OpenSecrets
- Race profile at The New York Times
- (Golden campaign site
- PVS)

== District 3 ==
2010 Virginia's 3rd congressional district election
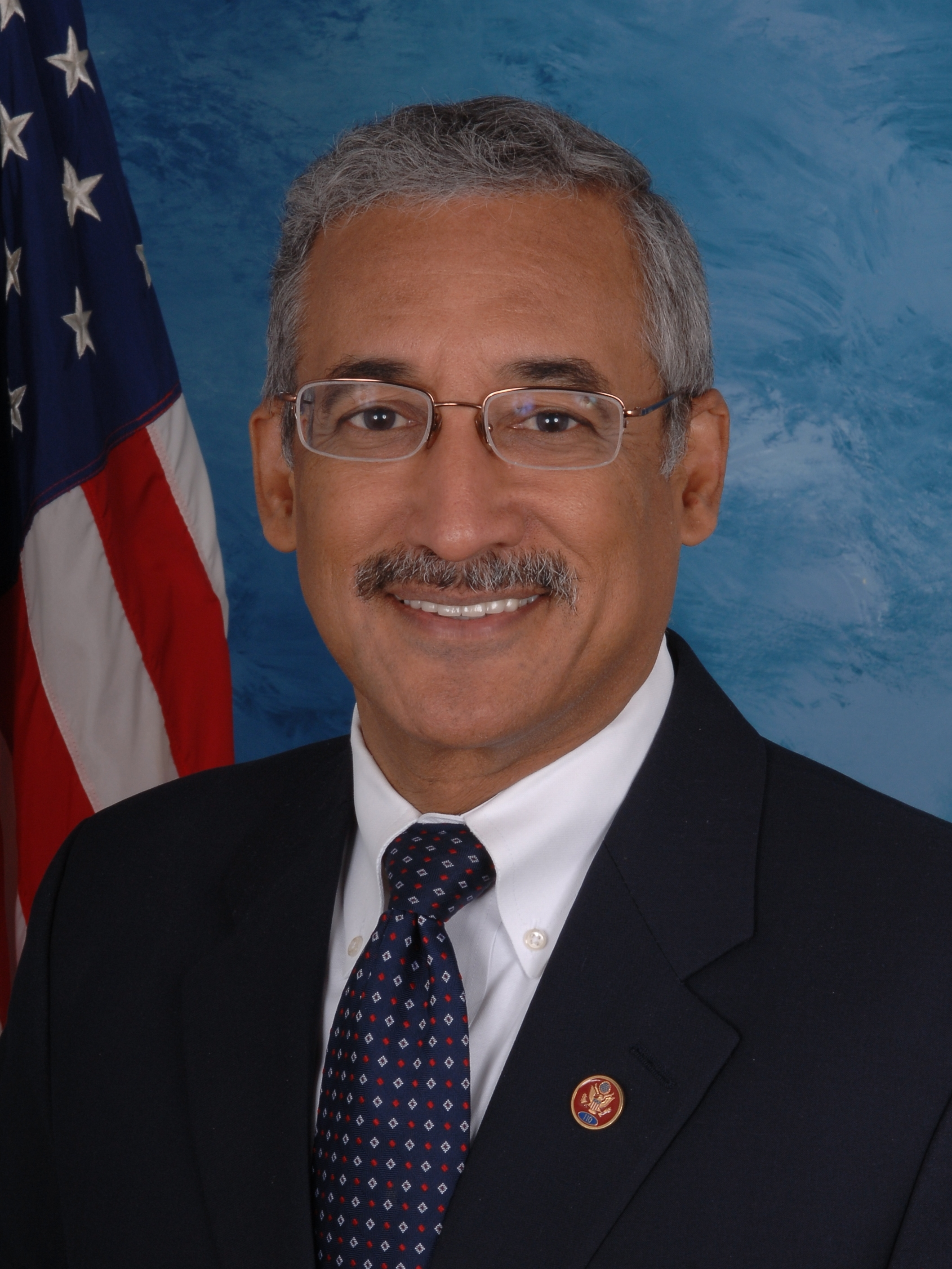

Nominee	Bobby Scott	Chuck Smith
Party	Democratic	Republican
Popular vote	114,754	44,553
Percentage	70.0%	27.2%
U.S. Representative before election
Bobby Scott
Democratic
Elected U.S. Representative
Bobby Scott
Democratic

Democratic incumbent Bobby Scott was challenged by Republican nominee former JAG Chuck Smith (campaign site, PVS) of Virginia Beach, Libertarian James Quigley (campaign site, PVS) of Hampton, and Independent John Kelly (campaign site, PVS).

Scott has run unopposed in five of the last six elections in what is considered a "safe" Democratic district. The district's current configuration dates to 1993, when the Justice Department ordered Virginia to create a majority-minority district.

=== General election ===
==== Predictions ====
Source	Ranking	As of
The Cook Political Report	Safe D	November 1, 2010
Rothenberg	Safe D	November 1, 2010
Sabato's Crystal Ball	Safe D	November 1, 2010
RCP	Safe D	November 1, 2010
CQ Politics	Safe D	October 28, 2010
New York Times	Safe D	November 1, 2010
FiveThirtyEight	Safe D	November 1, 2010

==== Results ====
Virginia's 3rd congressional district election, 2010
Party	Candidate	Votes	%
Democratic	Robert C. Scott (incumbent)	114,754	70.0
Republican	Chuck Smith	44,553	27.2
Libertarian	James Quigley	2,383	1.5
Independent	John D. Kelly	2,039	1.2
Write-in		171	0.1
Majority		70,201	42.8
Total votes		163,900	100.0
Democratic hold			

- Race ranking and details from CQ Politics
- Campaign contributions from OpenSecrets
- Race profile at The New York Times

== District 4 ==
2010 Virginia's 4th congressional district election
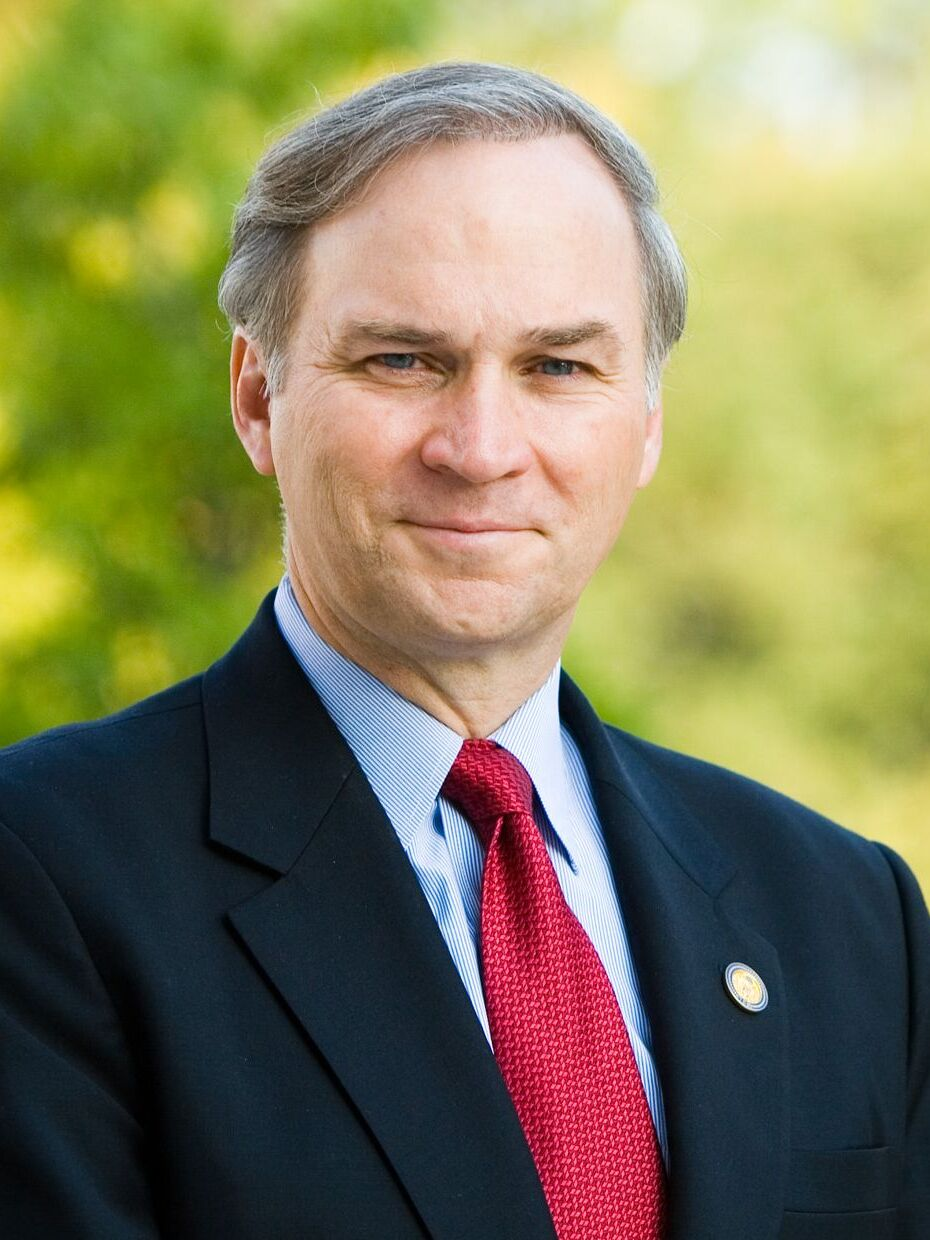

Nominee	Randy Forbes	Wynne LeGrow
Party	Republican	Democratic
Popular vote	123,659	74,298
Percentage	62.3%	37.5%
- County and independent city results Forbes: 50–60% 60–70% 70–80% 80–90% LeGrow: 50–60% 70–80%
U.S. Representative before election
Randy Forbes
Republican
Elected U.S. Representative
Randy Forbes
Republican

Republican incumbent Randy Forbes was challenged by Democratic nominee Wynne LeGrow of Emporia. Forbes retained his seat by beating his Democratic challenger by earning 62% of votes cast.

Forbes was first elected to the House in 2001 to fill a vacancy caused by the death of ten-term Democratic Congressman Norman Sisisky. Forbes defeated Democratic State Senator Louise Lucas 52-48% that year. He ran unopposed by Democrats in 2002 and 2006.

=== General election ===
==== Predictions ====
Source	Ranking	As of
The Cook Political Report	Safe R	November 1, 2010
Rothenberg	Safe R	November 1, 2010
Sabato's Crystal Ball	Safe R	November 1, 2010
RCP	Safe R	November 1, 2010
CQ Politics	Safe R	October 28, 2010
New York Times	Safe R	November 1, 2010
FiveThirtyEight	Safe R	November 1, 2010

==== Results ====
Virginia's 4th congressional district election, 2010
Party	Candidate	Votes	%
Republican	Randy Forbes (incumbent)	123,659	62.3
Democratic	Wynne LeGrow	74,298	37.5
Write-in		432	0.2
Majority		49,361	24.9
Total votes		198,389	100.0
Republican hold			

- Race ranking and details from CQ Politics
- Campaign contributions from OpenSecrets
- Race profile at The New York Times

== District 5 ==
2010 Virginia's 5th congressional district election
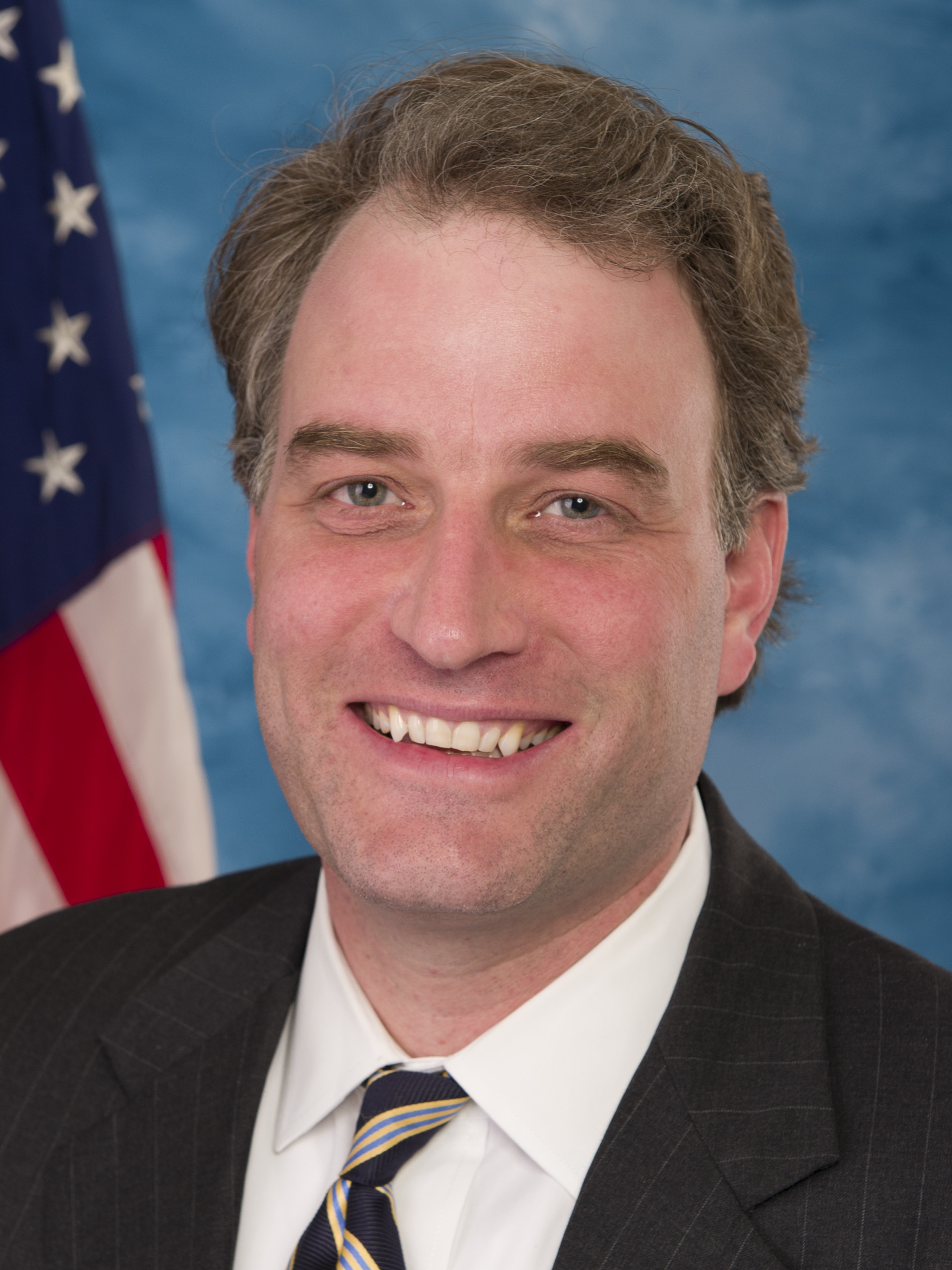

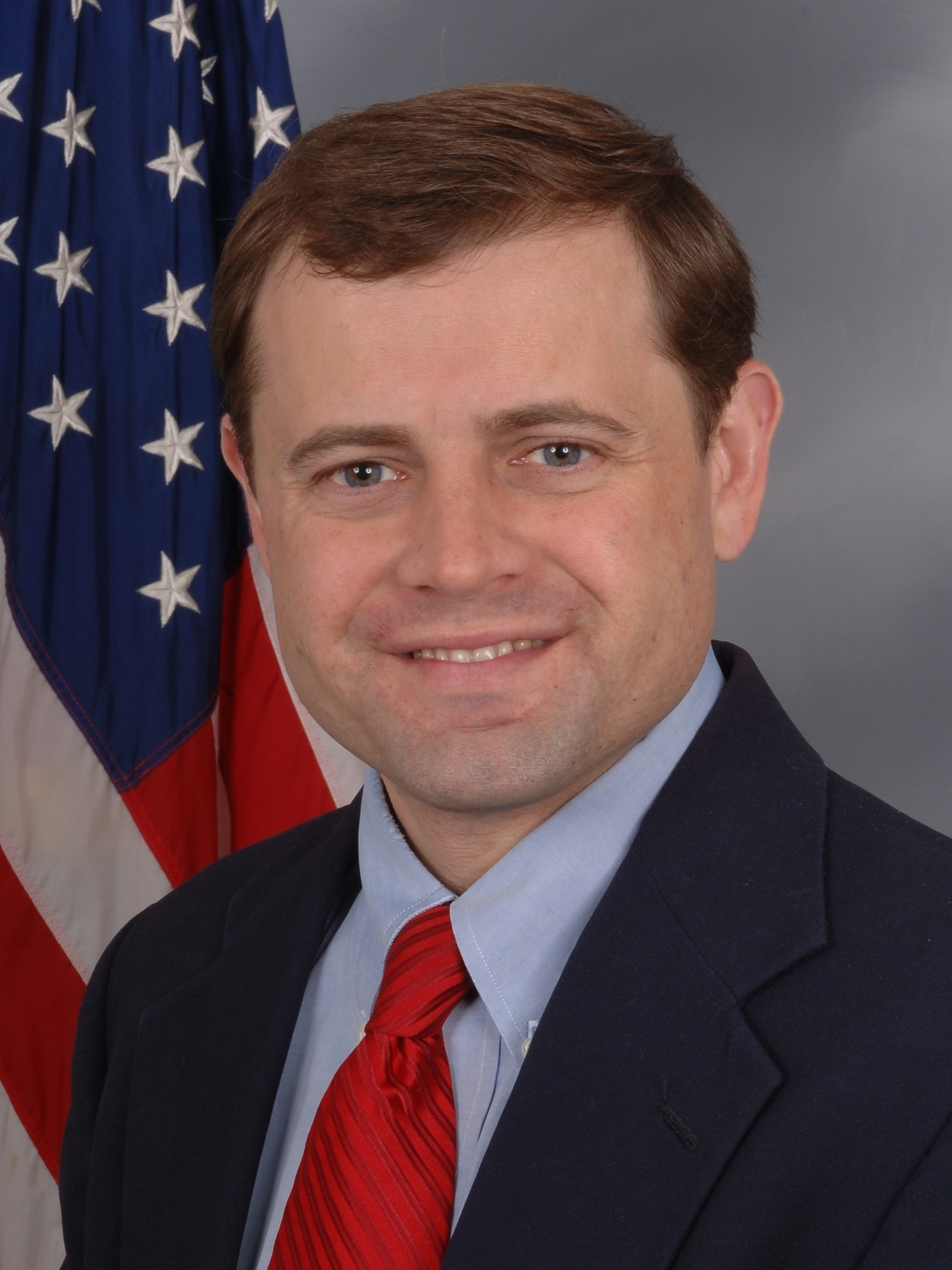
Nominee	Robert Hurt	Tom Perriello
Party	Republican	Democratic
Popular vote	119,560	110,562
Percentage	50.8%	47.0%
- County and independent city results Hurt: 40–50% 50–60% 60–70% Perriello: 50–60% 60–70% 70–80%
U.S. Representative before election
Tom Perriello
Democratic
Elected U.S. Representative
Robert Hurt
Republican

Incumbent Democrat Tom Perriello was challenged by Republican Robert Hurt, state Senator from Chatham, and independent Jeffrey A. Clark (campaign site, PVS), a businessman from Danville.

In 2008, Perriello defeated Republican incumbent Virgil Goode. Goode did not seek a rematch in 2010, although he said several Conservative groups asked him to run on a pro-Tea Party ticket, due to their dissatisfaction with the Republicans.

=== Republican primary ===
Hurt won the primary election over six other candidates: Republican activist Feda Kidd Morton, private real estate investor Laurence Verga, Albemarle County Supervisor Ken Boyd, businessman Ron Ferrin, Jim McKelvey from Franklin County, and Michael McPadden. Perriello faced no opposition in the Democratic primary.

==== Declined ====
- Rob Bell, state delegate
- Virgil Goode, former U.S. Representative

==== Results ====
Republican primary results
Party	Candidate	Votes	%
Republican	Robert Hurt	17,120	48.4
Republican	Jim McKelvey	9,153	25.9
Republican	Michael McPadden	3,460	9.8
Republican	Ken Boyd	2,608	7.4
Republican	Feda Kidd Morton	1,626	4.6
Republican	Laurence Verga	802	2.3
Republican	Ron Ferrin	583	1.6
Total votes		35,352	100.0

=== General election ===
==== Polling ====
Poll source	Date(s) administered	Sample size (Note: Key: A – all adults RV – registered voters LV – likely voters V – unclear)	Margin of error	Tom Perriello (D)	Robert Hurt (R)	Jeffrey Clark (I)	Undecided
Survey USA	September 28, 2010	()	±	35%	58%	4%	3%
Benenson Strategy Group	September 21, 2010	()	±	44%	46%	4%	5%
Global Strategy Group	September 7, 2010	()	±	42%	44%	6%	7%
Survey USA	September 2, 2010	()	±	35%	61%	2%	2%
American Action Forum	August 12, 2010	()	±	43%	49%	–	8%
Survey USA	July 20, 2010	()	±	35%	58%	4%	3%
Public Policy Polling	February 5–10, 2010	924 (V)	±3.2%	44%	44%	–	13%

==== Predictions ====
Source	Ranking	As of
The Cook Political Report	Lean R (flip)	November 1, 2010
Rothenberg	Tilt R (flip)	November 1, 2010
Sabato's Crystal Ball	Lean R (flip)	November 1, 2010
RCP	Lean R (flip)	November 1, 2010
CQ Politics	Tossup	October 28, 2010
New York Times	Lean R (flip)	November 1, 2010
FiveThirtyEight	Likely R (flip)	November 1, 2010

==== Results ====
Virginia's 5th congressional district election, 2010
Party	Candidate	Votes	%
Republican	Robert Hurt	119,560	50.8
Democratic	Tom Perriello (incumbent)	110,562	47.0
Independent	Jeffrey Clark	4,992	2.1
Write-in		185	0.1
Majority		8,998	3.8
Total votes		235,299	100.0
Republican gain from Democratic			

- VA - District 5 from OurCampaigns.com
- Race ranking and details from CQ Politics
- Campaign contributions from OpenSecrets
- Race profile at The New York Times

== District 6 ==
2010 Virginia's 6th congressional district election
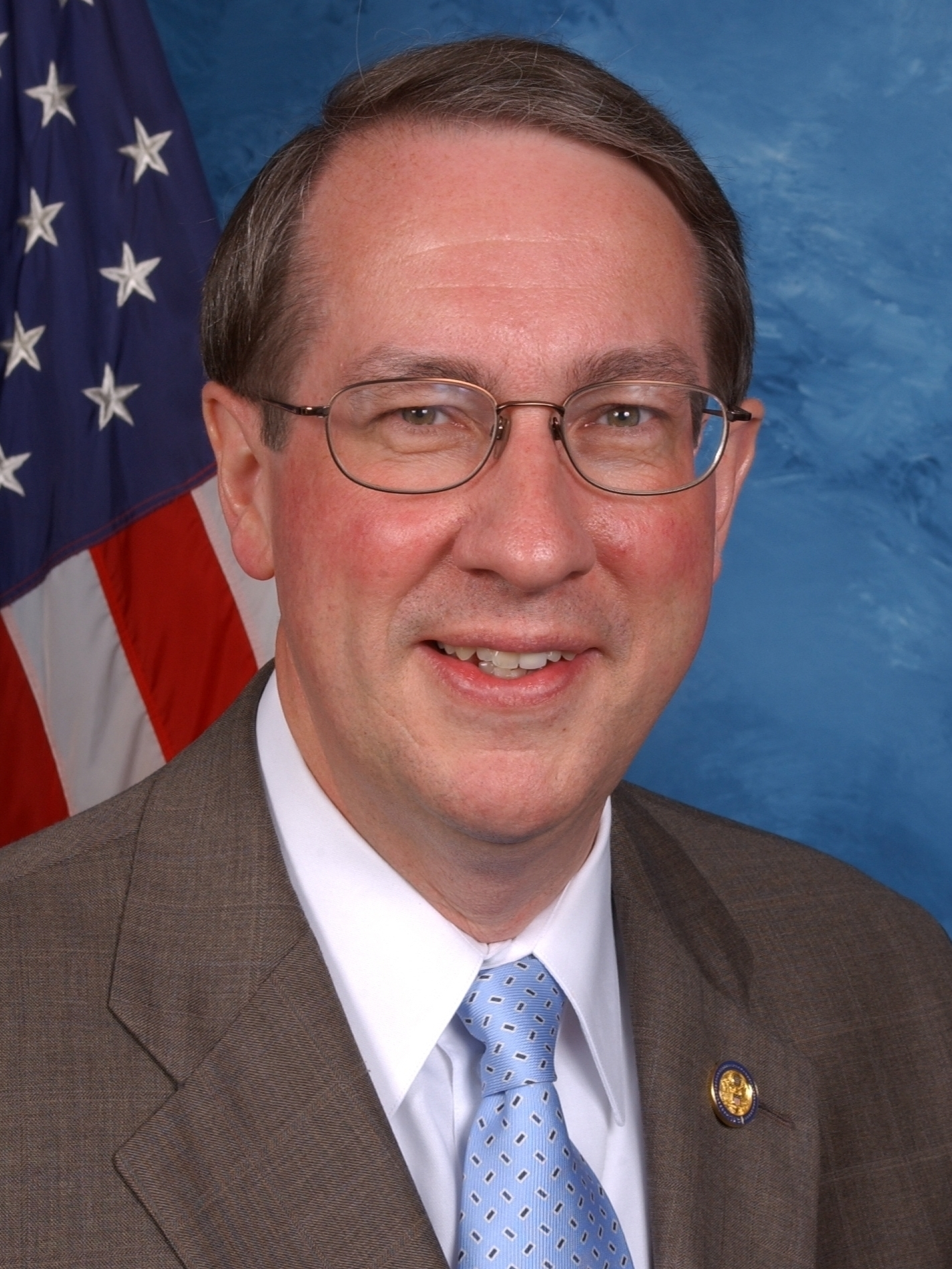

Nominee	Bob Goodlatte	Jeff Vanke	Stuart Bain
Party	Republican	Independent	Libertarian
Popular vote	127,487	21,649	15,309
Percentage	76.3%	13.0%	9.2%
- County and independent city results Goodlatte: 50–60% 60–70% 70–80% 80–90%
U.S. Representative before election
Bob Goodlatte
Republican
Elected U.S. Representative
Bob Goodlatte
Republican

Incumbent Republican Bob Goodlatte faced no primary opposition, and was re-elected to a 10th term in the general election on November 2, capturing 76% of the vote.

Jeff Vanke of Roanoke ran as an independent, citing endorsements by the Modern Whig Party, American Centrist Party and Independent Green Party of Virginia, and received 13% of the vote.

Stuart Bain of Salem ran as a Libertarian and received 9% of the vote.

=== General election ===
==== Predictions ====
Source	Ranking	As of
The Cook Political Report	Safe R	November 1, 2010
Rothenberg	Safe R	November 1, 2010
Sabato's Crystal Ball	Safe R	November 1, 2010
RCP	Safe R	November 1, 2010
CQ Politics	Safe R	October 28, 2010
New York Times	Safe R	November 1, 2010
FiveThirtyEight	Safe R	November 1, 2010

==== Results ====
Virginia's 6th congressional district election, 2010
Party	Candidate	Votes	%
Republican	Bob Goodlatte (incumbent)	127,487	76.27
Independent	Jeff Vanke	21,649	12.95
Libertarian	Stuart Bain	15,309	9.16
Write-in		2,709	1.62
Majority			
Total votes		167,154	100
Republican hold			

== District 7 ==
2010 Virginia's 7th congressional district election
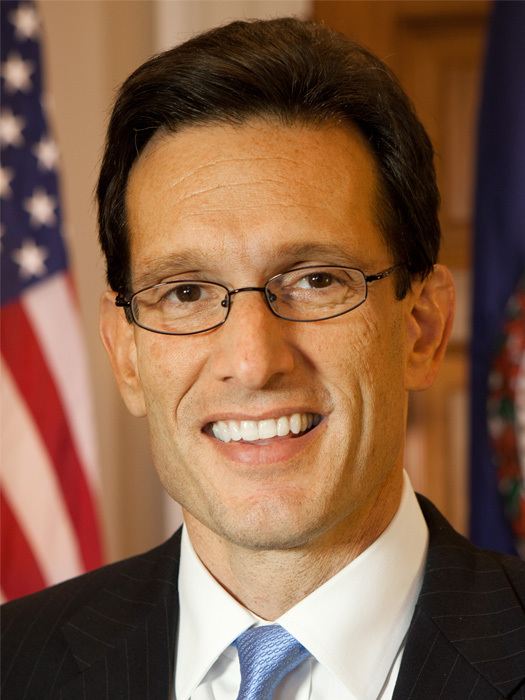

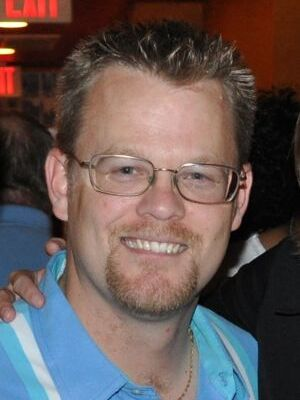
Nominee	Eric Cantor	Rick Waugh
Party	Republican	Democratic
Popular vote	138,209	79,616
Percentage	59.2%	34.1%
- County and independent city results Cantor: 50–60% 60–70% 70–80% 80–90% Waugh: 40–50% 50–60%
U.S. Representative before election
Eric Cantor
Republican
Elected U.S. Representative
Eric Cantor
Republican

Incumbent Republican Congressman and U.S. House Minority Whip Eric Cantor sought a sixth term and faced no primary opposition. Rick Waugh (campaign site, PVS) was the Democratic nominee, and Floyd C. Bayne (campaign site, PVS) was the Independent Greens of Virginia and Tea Party supported candidate. Tea Party-supported independent candidate Herb Lux (campaign site) had his emergency appeal to the United States Supreme Court turned aside on October 1, 2010, and so did not appear on the ballot.

=== General election ===
==== Predictions ====
Source	Ranking	As of
The Cook Political Report	Safe R	November 1, 2010
Rothenberg	Safe R	November 1, 2010
Sabato's Crystal Ball	Safe R	November 1, 2010
RCP	Safe R	November 1, 2010
CQ Politics	Safe R	October 28, 2010
New York Times	Safe R	November 1, 2010
FiveThirtyEight	Safe R	November 1, 2010

==== Results ====
Virginia's 7th congressional district election, 2010
Party	Candidate	Votes	%
Republican	Eric Cantor (incumbent)	138,209	59.22
Democratic	Rick Waugh	79,616	34.11
Independent Greens	Floyd Bayne	15,164	6.50
Write-in		413	0.18
Majority			
Total votes		233,402	100
Republican hold			

- VA - District 7 from OurCampaigns.com
- Race ranking and details from CQ Politics
- Campaign contributions from OpenSecrets
- Race profile at The New York Times

== District 8 ==
2010 Virginia's 8th congressional district election
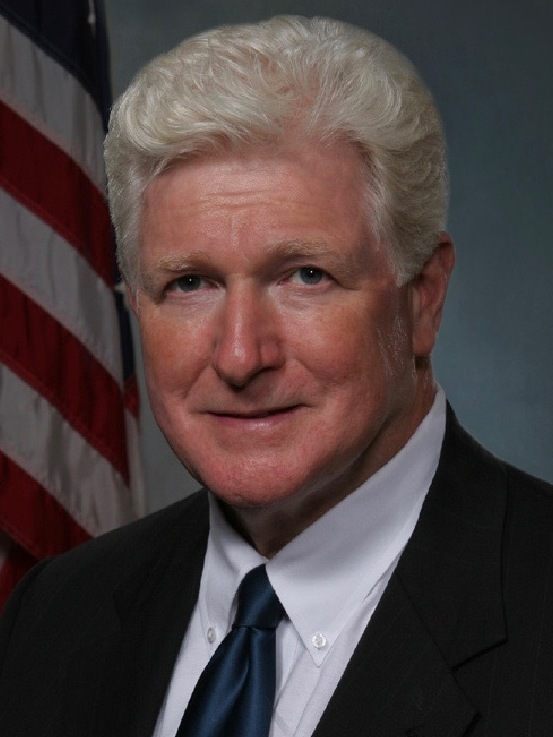

Nominee	Jim Moran	Jay Patrick Murray
Party	Democratic	Republican
Popular vote	116,404	71,145
Percentage	61.0%	37.3%
- County and independent city results Moran: 50–60% 60–70%
U.S. Representative before election
Jim Moran
Democratic
Elected U.S. Representative
Jim Moran
Democratic

Democratic incumbent Jim Moran was challenged by Republican nominee Jay Patrick Murray, a retired United States Army Colonel, and Independent Green Party nominee Ron Fisher (campaign site, PVS), a retired U.S. Navy captain.

=== Democratic primary ===
Moran ran for re-election for an 11th term, and faced no primary opposition.

=== Republican primary ===
Former Republican primary candidates were:

- Matthew Berry, an attorney and former clerk to U.S. Supreme Court Justice Clarence Thomas. Berry lost to Murray in a primary election on June 8.
- Mark Ellmore, Republican nominee in the 2008 race.
- Laurence Socci, lobbyist. Socci dropped out on March 23 and endorsed Berry.
- Will Radle - formerly considering a run for the Republican nomination

==== Results ====
Republican primary results
Party	Candidate	Votes	%
Republican	Jay Patrick Murray	7,136	51.7
Republican	Matthew Berry	6,654	48.3
Total votes		13,790	100.0

=== General election ===
==== Polling ====
Source	Dates Administered	Jim Moran (D)	Patrick Murray (R)	Undecided/Other
Pollster unavailable, results via The Washington Post	October 2010	58%	31%	11%
McLaughlin & Associates	September 2010	45%	32%	23%

==== Predictions ====
Source	Ranking	As of
The Cook Political Report	Safe D	November 1, 2010
Rothenberg	Safe D	November 1, 2010
Sabato's Crystal Ball	Safe D	November 1, 2010
RCP	Safe D	November 1, 2010
CQ Politics	Safe D	October 28, 2010
New York Times	Safe D	November 1, 2010
FiveThirtyEight	Safe D	November 1, 2010

==== Results ====
Virginia's 8th congressional district election, 2010
Party	Candidate	Votes	%
Democratic	Jim Moran (incumbent)	116,404	61.03
Republican	Jay Patrick Murray	71,145	37.30
Independent Greens	J. Ron Fisher	2,707	1.42
Write-in		492	0.26
Majority			
Total votes		190,748	100.0
Democratic hold			

- Race ranking and details from CQ Politics
- Campaign contributions from OpenSecrets
- Race profile at The New York Times

== District 9 ==
2010 Virginia's 9th congressional district election
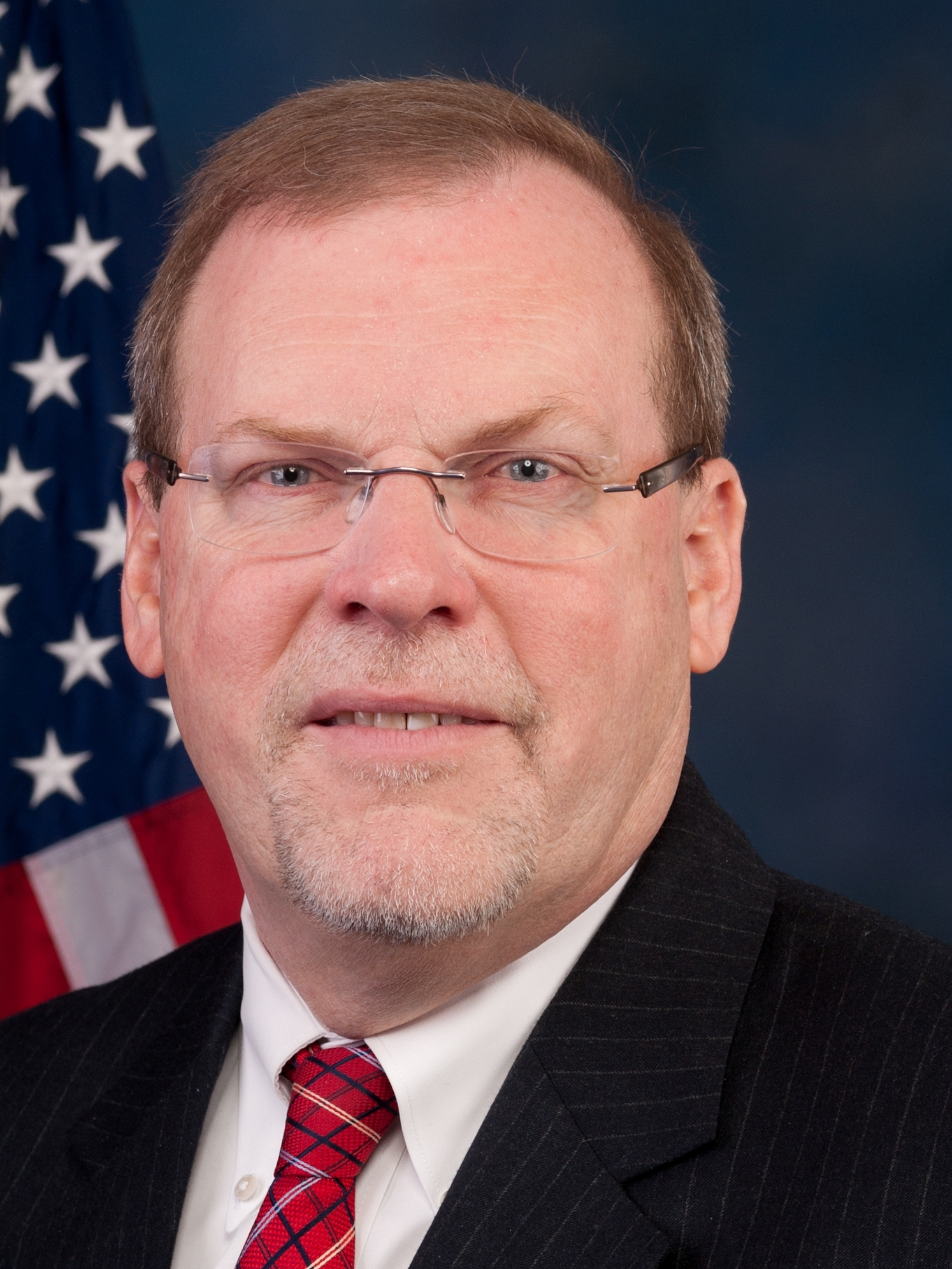

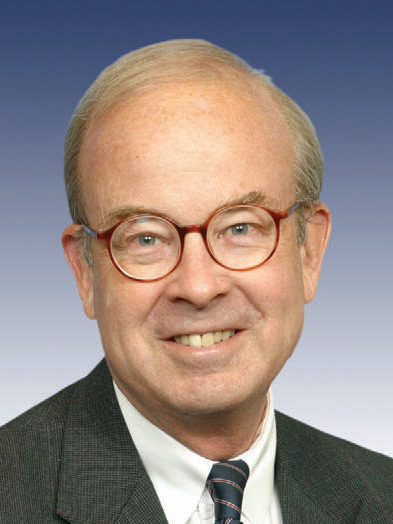
Nominee	Morgan Griffith	Rick Boucher
Party	Republican	Democratic
Popular vote	95,726	86,743
Percentage	51.2%	46.4%
- County and independent city results Griffith: 40–50% 50–60% 60–70% Boucher: 40–50% 50–60%
U.S. Representative before election
Rick Boucher
Democratic
Elected U.S. Representative
Morgan Griffith
Republican

Democratic incumbent Rick Boucher was challenged by Republican nominee Morgan Griffith, the Majority Leader of the Virginia House of Delegates, and Independent Jeremiah Heaton (campaign site, PVS), a U.S. Army veteran, farmer and businessman. The 9th District covers much of Southwest Virginia.

=== Democratic primary ===
Boucher, who had represented the district since 1983, was unopposed on the Democratic side.

=== Republican primary ===
On the Republican side, Griffith was selected by a convention held on May 22, 2010, at Fort Chiswell High School in Max Meadows. Delegates to the convention were selected by 23 local committee mass meetings held between February 25 and April 29. Other Republican candidates for the nomination were:

- William Carr: retiree from Ararat
- Adam Light: small business owner from Tazewell County
- David Moore: former Lieutenant Colonel in the US Army from Tazewell County
- Jessee Ring: retired engineer from Pulaski County.
- Brandon Roop: tea party activist from Blacksburg
- Jim Bebout, retiree, announced during a tea party protest

=== General election ===
==== Predictions ====
Source	Ranking	As of
The Cook Political Report	Tossup	November 1, 2010
Rothenberg	Tilt D	November 1, 2010
Sabato's Crystal Ball	Lean D	November 1, 2010
RCP	Lean D	November 1, 2010
CQ Politics	Lean D	October 28, 2010
New York Times	Lean D	November 1, 2010
FiveThirtyEight	Lean D	November 1, 2010

==== Results ====
Virginia's 9th congressional district election, 2010
Party	Candidate	Votes	%
Republican	Morgan Griffith	95,726	51.21
Democratic	Rick Boucher (incumbent)	86,743	46.41
Independent	Jeremiah Heaton	4,282	2.29
Write-in		166	0.09
Majority			
Total votes		186,917	100.0
Republican gain from Democratic			

- VA - District 9 from OurCampaigns.com
- Race ranking and details from CQ Politics
- Campaign contributions from OpenSecrets
- Race profile at The New York Times

== District 10 ==
2010 Virginia's 10th congressional district election
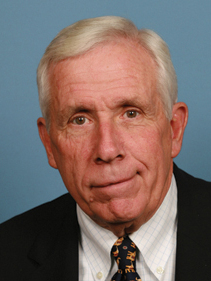

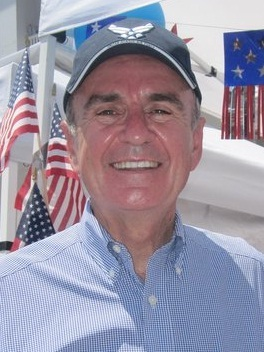
Nominee	Frank Wolf	Jeff Barnett
Party	Republican	Democratic
Popular vote	119,560	72,604
Percentage	62.9%	34.8%
- County and independent city results Wolf: 50–60% 60–70% 70–80%
U.S. Representative before election
Frank Wolf
Republican
Elected U.S. Representative
Frank Wolf
Republican

Republican incumbent Frank Wolf was running for re-election for a 16th term. He was challenged by Democrat Jeff Barnett (campaign site, PVS) and Libertarian Bill Redpath. The district, located in northern Virginia, includes some Washington, D.C. suburbs, but extends far west and north along the border of Maryland and West Virginia. In most Presidential elections of the past few decades, the district has been won by Republican candidates. The most recent exception is the 2008 election when Democratic then-Senator Barack Obama won the district, and became the first Democrat since Johnson to win Virginia's electoral votes.

=== Republican primary ===
Wolf was unopposed on the Republican side.

=== Democratic primary ===
Barnett won the Democratic primary election against Richard Anthony and Julien Modica.

Former candidates were:

- Dennis Findley (D) - McLean resident and architect
- Jim Trautz (R) - Loudoun County resident and former naval officer

=== General election ===
==== Predictions ====
Source	Ranking	As of
The Cook Political Report	Safe R	November 1, 2010
Rothenberg	Safe R	November 1, 2010
Sabato's Crystal Ball	Safe R	November 1, 2010
RCP	Safe R	November 1, 2010
CQ Politics	Safe R	October 28, 2010
New York Times	Safe R	November 1, 2010
FiveThirtyEight	Safe R	November 1, 2010

==== Results ====
Virginia's 10th congressional district election, 2010
Party	Candidate	Votes	%
Republican	Frank Wolf (incumbent)	131,116	62.87
Democratic	Jeff Barnett	72,604	34.81
Libertarian	Bill Redpath	4,607	2.21
Write-in		229	0.11
Majority			
Total votes		208,556	100
Republican hold			

- Race ranking and details from CQ Politics
- Campaign contributions from OpenSecrets
- Race profile at The New York Times

== District 11 ==
2010 Virginia's 11th congressional district election
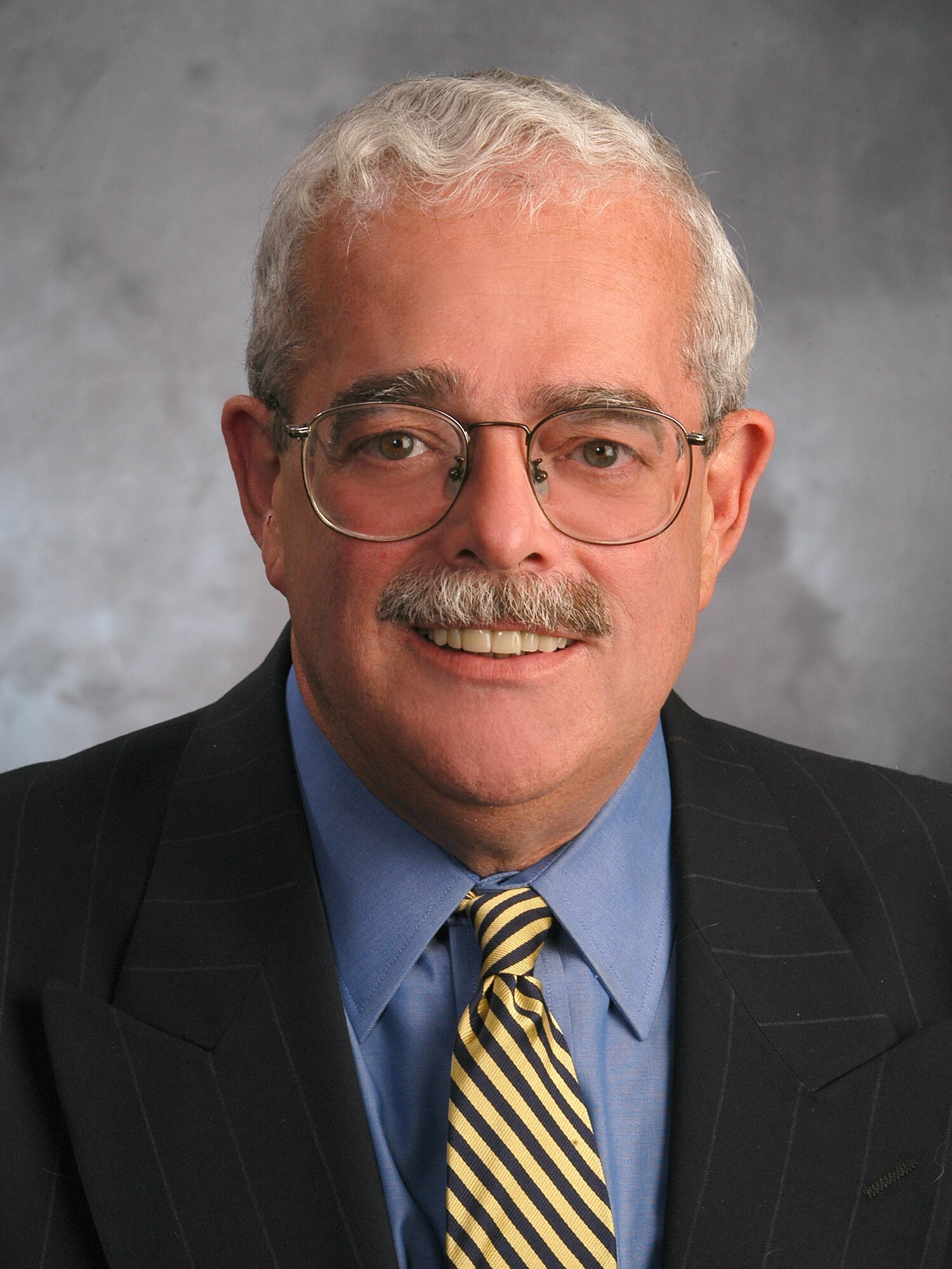

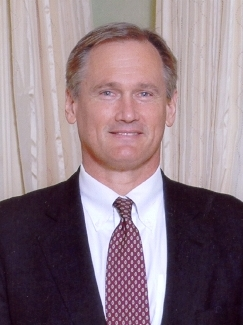
Nominee	Gerry Connolly	Keith Fimian
Party	Democratic	Republican
Popular vote	111,720	110,739
Percentage	49.2%	48.8%
- County and independent city results Connolly: 50–60% Fimian: 50–60%
U.S. Representative before election
Gerry Connolly
Democratic
Elected U.S. Representative
Gerry Connolly
Democratic

Democratic incumbent Gerry Connolly faced Republican Keith Fimian, who lost to Connolly in 2008. Also on the ballot were Libertarian David L. Dotson (campaign site, PVS), Independent Green David William Gillis Jr. (campaign site, PVS), and Independent Christopher F. DeCarlo (campaign site, PVS).

=== Democratic primary ===
Connolly was unopposed for the Democratic nomination.

=== Republican primary ===
Fimian won against Pat Herrity in the Republican primary election, beating him 56%-44%, with 35,890 votes cast.

==== Results ====
Republican primary results
Party	Candidate	Votes	%
Republican	Keith Fimian	20,075	55.9
Republican	Pat Herrity	15,815	44.1
Total votes		35,890	100.0

=== General election ===
==== Predictions ====
Source	Ranking	As of
The Cook Political Report	Tossup	November 1, 2010
Rothenberg	Lean D	November 1, 2010
Sabato's Crystal Ball	Lean D	November 1, 2010
RCP	Tossup	November 1, 2010
CQ Politics	Lean D	October 28, 2010
New York Times	Tossup	November 1, 2010
FiveThirtyEight	Lean D	November 1, 2010

==== Results ====
Virginia's 11th congressional district election, 2010
Party	Candidate	Votes	%
Democratic	Gerry Connolly (incumbent)	111,720	49.23
Republican	Keith Fimian	110,739	48.79
Independent	Christopher DeCarlo	1,846	0.81
Libertarian	David Dotson	1,382	0.61
Independent Greens	David Gillis, Jr.	959	0.42
Write-in		171	0.08
Majority			
Total votes		226,951	100.0
Democratic hold			

- VA - District 11 from OurCampaigns.com
- Race ranking and details from CQ Politics
- Campaign contributions from OpenSecrets
- Race profile at The New York Times
