= David Ramadan =

American politician

David-Imad Ramadan

Member of the Virginia House of Delegates from the 87th district
- In office January 11, 2012 – January 5, 2016
- Preceded by: Paula Miller
- Succeeded by: John Bell

Personal details
- Born: David-Iman Ramadan; May 31, 1970 (age 56) Beirut, Lebanon
- Party: Republican
- Education: George Mason University (BA, MA); University of Oxford; Johns Hopkins University; Georgetown University
- Occupation: Entrepreneur, consultant, pundit, politician, educator, professor
- Website: http://www.davidramadan.com/

David-Imad Ramadan (born May 31, 1970) is a Lebanese-born American politician and businessman. He is a former Republican member of the Virginia House of Delegates, representing the 87th district in Loudoun and Prince William counties from 2012 to 2016. He opted not to seek re-election in 2015, and was succeeded by his 2013 opponent, Democrat John J. Bell.

== Early life and education ==
Ramadan grew up in Lebanon and completed his high school studies at International College, Beirut. He emigrated to the United States in 1989 and has resided in Virginia since then. He is a graduate of George Mason University, earning a Bachelor of Arts degree in government and politics and a Master of Arts degree in international trade and transactions. He completed graduate studies at Oxford University, the American Graduate School of Business (Geneva, Switzerland), Johns Hopkins University, and Georgetown University.

== Career ==
Prior to entering politics, Ramadan worked at Curves International and in the government relations sector.

Ramadan is also a frequent commentator on TV and radio news networks such as ABC's Good Morning America, LBC, MSNBC, France 24, Al-Hurra, BBC, CNN, and NPR.

Ramadan served on the Board of Visitors of George Mason University, where he was appointed by Governor Bob McDonnell on July 1, 2010. The Washington Post on July 1, 2010, described the appointment by Governor McDonnell "as a thank you to longtime supporters and friends". He is also an adjunct professor at George Mason University, teaching "Global Affairs - Middle East Realities" and "Virginia Government and Politics" courses.

Ramadan is a political activist with active roles in the Republican Party of Virginia, the Loudoun County Republican Committee, and the Arab-American Republican community. He has served on presidential political campaigns as well as on gubernatorial and senatorial campaigns, and was appointed by RPV Chair in 2008 to ethnic outreach leadership.

In November 2018, when Republican Congresswoman Barbara Comstock was ousted by Democratic nominee Jennifer Wexton, Ramadan told The Washington Post that her loss is to be blamed on factors at the national level, not the district level. He has been outspoken about his belief that the Virginia Republican party needs to pay more attention to the needs and opinions of Northern Virginia, and not just to rural voters in the rest of the Commonwealth. In November 2024, Ramadan joined Comstock and Democratic officials state senator Suhas Subramanyam, Wexton, and state senator Russet Perry to help elect Democratic candidates including Kamala Harris.

=== Legislative history ===
Ramadan served on the several committees in the Virginia House of Delegates, specifically Privileges & Elections (P&E), Science & Technology (S&T), and the General Laws Committee. He served as the chairman of the P&E Constitutional Amendments Subcommittee.

Ramadan was the co-founder and co-chairman of the "Business Development Caucus," and the co-founded and co-chairman of the "Redskins Pride Caucus".

Ramadan authored several pieces of legislation which became law during his four years in the Virginia House:

- Constitutional Amendment in support of military families
- Online Voter Registration
- High School to Work Partnerships
- Diwali Day
- Securing the State Corporation Commission electronic system
- High School Biliteracy Diploma Seal
- Sex Offenders and Crimes Against Minors Supplement to Registry

== Electoral history ==
Date	Election	Candidate	Party	Votes	%
Virginia House of Delegates, 87th district
August 23, 2011	Republican primary	David I. Ramadan		1,368	55.76
August 23, 2011	Republican primary	Jo-Ann Chase		1,085	44.23
November 8, 2011	General	David I. Ramadan	Republican	5,435	49.92
November 8, 2011	General	Mike D. Kondratick	Democratic	5,384	49.45
November 8, 2011	General	Write Ins		67	0.61
November 8, 2011	General	Paula Miller was redistricted out; seat changed from Democratic to Republican			
November 5, 2013	General	David I. Ramadan	Republican	10,274	50.26
November 5, 2013	General	John J. Bell	Democratic	10,087	49.35
November 5, 2013	General	Write Ins		52	0.24
