= John Bell (Virginia politician) =

American politician from Virginia

Member of the Virginia Senate from the 13th district
- In office January 8, 2020 – January 10, 2024
- Preceded by: Dick Black
- Succeeded by: Suhas Subramanyam (redistricting)

Member of the Virginia House of Delegates from the 87th district
- In office January 13, 2016 – January 8, 2020
- Preceded by: David Ramadan
- Succeeded by: Suhas Subramanyam

Personal details
- Born: John Joseph Bell; January 29, 1963 (age 63) Louisville, Kentucky, U.S.
- Party: Democratic
- Spouse: Margaret Bell
- Children: 5
- Education: Regis University (BA); Western New England University (MBA); George Washington University (MA)

Military service
- Allegiance: United States
- Branch: United States Air Force
- Service years: 1981–2007
- Rank: Major

John Joseph Bell (born January 29, 1963) is an American politician and a retired United States Air Force officer. A Democrat, he served in the Virginia Senate, representing the 13th district from 2020 to 2024. From 2016 to 2020 he served as a member of the Virginia House of Delegates, representing the 87th District. Both districts are located in Loudoun County and Prince William County.

== Career ==
Bell served in the United States Air Force from 1981 to 2007, working as a finance officer and retiring as a Major.

From 2016 to 2020, Bell represented the 87th District in the Virginia House of Delegates.

In August 2018, Bell announced he would run in 2019 for Virginia State Senate District 13, then represented by Republican Dick Black. Bell's announcement came with endorsements from 14 elected Democrats in Virginia, including state Attorney General Mark Herring, House of Delegates Minority Leader David Toscano, and state senator Jennifer Wexton, who was subsequently elected to U.S. Congress.

Bell won the election in November 2019, defeating Republican Loudoun County supervisor Geary Higgins in the general election.

Bell declined to run for a second 4-year term in 2023, citing a cancer diagnosis.

== Personal life ==
Bell is married to wife Margaret, who is a local realtor. They have five children and three grandchildren.

Virginia House of Delegates
Preceded by David Ramadan	Member of the Virginia House of Delegates from the 87th district 2016–2020	Succeeded by Suhas Subramanyam
Senate of Virginia
Preceded by Dick Black	Member of the Virginia Senate from the 13th district 2020–2024	Succeeded by Lashrecse Aird
