= Glenn Nye =

American politician (born 1974)

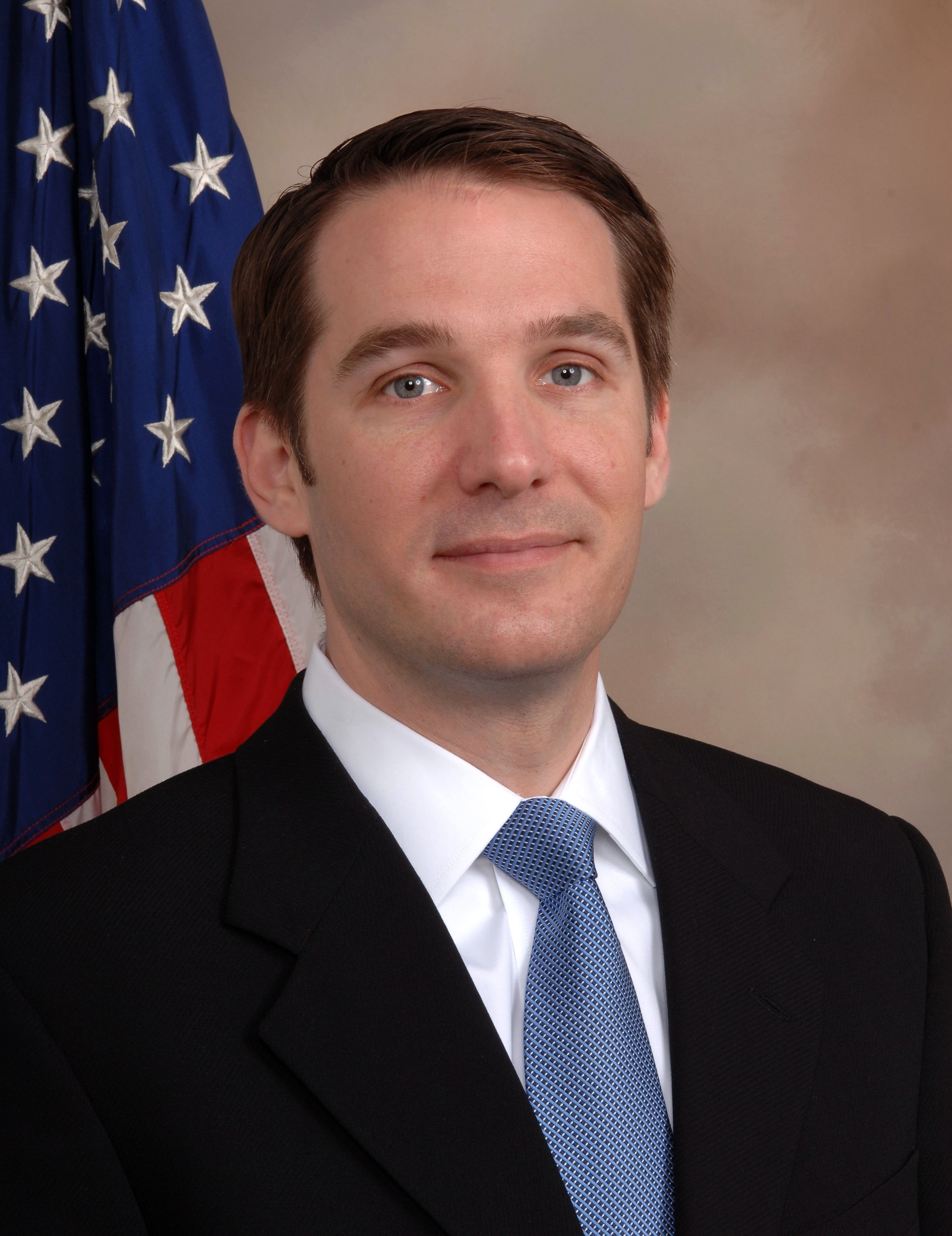

Member of the U.S. House of Representatives from Virginia's 2nd district
- In office January 3, 2009 – January 3, 2011
- Preceded by: Thelma Drake
- Succeeded by: Scott Rigell

Personal details
- Born: Glenn Carlyle Nye III; September 9, 1974 (age 51) Philadelphia, Pennsylvania, U.S.
- Party: Democratic
- Education: Georgetown University (BS)
- Website: Official website

Glenn Carlyle Nye III (born September 9, 1974) is an American politician who was the U.S. representative for Virginia's 2nd congressional district from 2009 to 2011. He is a member of the Democratic Party. He lost re-election in 2010. The district included all of Virginia Beach and the Eastern Shore, as well as parts of Norfolk and Hampton. He is the last representative from the second district who did not serve in the United States Military.

Nye currently serves as president and CEO of the Center for the Study of the Presidency and Congress.

== Early life, education and career ==
Nye was born in Philadelphia, but his family has lived in the Hampton Roads area for five generations. He grew up in Norfolk and graduated from high school at Norfolk Academy. A graduate of the Edmund A. Walsh School of Foreign Service at Georgetown University in Washington, D.C., he volunteered on medical education missions to the Middle East while in college. He began his foreign service career focusing on economic development in war-torn Eastern Europe while working for the U.S. director at the European Bank for Reconstruction and Development.

== Government career ==
Nye joined the U.S. State Department in 2001, where he served in Kosovo and Macedonia as a member of the Foreign Service. During the Macedonian Conflict in 2001, he helped organize the evacuation of 26 American unlawful combatants serving in the ranks of ethnic Albanian separatist insurgents from the village of Arachinovo, and helped negotiate the release of 26 U.S. servicemen that were trapped outside of the village by roadblocks set by Macedonian civilians that were protesting the evacuation. For this, Nye received the State Department's Superior Honor Award, although the incident is considered to be highly controversial within Macedonia.

Nye was then posted to the U.S. Embassy in Singapore, where he helped protect U.S. intellectual property rights during the negotiation of the U.S.-Singapore Free Trade Agreement. From there he volunteered to go to Afghanistan, spending almost a year as part of a U.S. government sponsored team managing the historic Afghan Constitution Commission and supporting the country's first presidential election.

He also managed a U.S. Agency for International Development (USAID) community development program in the West Bank and Gaza. He served as operations director in the Middle East by registering eligible voters in major U.S. cities for Iraq's Transitional National Assembly election. In Iraq, Nye led operations to create jobs for Iraqis as part of the counter-insurgency effort. After returning to Virginia, he advised a USAID program working closely with military colleagues to stabilize Iraqi neighborhoods by creating employment for over 70,000 Iraqis. In an interview with CQ Politics, Nye explained why he decided to run for Congress: "There is only so much one can do on the executing end of foreign policy in terms of advancing American interests, and there's only so much you can do to influence the policy from the outside. I was frustrated with the course of the country, and I was prepared to offer my service to try to bring some expertise into the Congress that I think the Congress is lacking." Nye and Drake had clashed over energy policy. Drake supported new drilling in Alaska and along the continental shelf off the East Coast. Nye stated that oil companies can and should expand existing oil fields which are now economically feasible to exploit.

== U.S. House of Representatives ==
=== Elections ===
2008

Nye won the Democratic nomination for the 2nd District and faced Thelma Drake in the November election. Nye's donations from national Democrats, including House Speaker Nancy Pelosi of California, Majority Leader Steny Hoyer of Maryland and Representative Charles Rangel of New York, reflected the interest of the party in his race. Although they endorsed his opponent in 2006, Nye was endorsed by The Virginian-Pilot in 2008.

In the November election, Nye defeated Drake with 52 percent of the vote. The 2nd District saw a Democratic Party sweep in 2008, with both Barack Obama and Mark Warner winning the district in the presidential and Senate races, respectively.

2010

Nye was defeated by Republican nominee Scott Rigell, a businessman and automobile dealer. Independent Kenny Golden, a retired Navy Captain, was also on the ballot.

=== Tenure ===
Soon after being sworn in, Nye joined the Blue Dog Coalition, a caucus of conservative Democrats.

Nye voted with the Democratic majority for the American Recovery and Reinvestment Act of 2009 and the Lilly Ledbetter Fair Pay Act of 2009. Nye joined with 43 other Democrats to vote against the American Clean Energy and Security Act in June 2009, and in November 2009, Nye voted along with 38 other Democrats against the Affordable Health Care for America Act, saying that the bill did not do enough to reduce health care costs, and that it cut too much money from children's hospitals. Nye also voted against the Stupak Amendment.

Nye was endorsed by the Chamber of Commerce and the National Federation of Independent Business.

=== Committee assignments ===
- Committee on Armed Services
  - Subcommittee on Readiness
  - Subcommittee on Seapower and Expeditionary Forces
  - Subcommittee on Oversight and Investigations
- Committee on Small Business
  - Subcommittee on Finance and Tax
  - Subcommittee on Contracting and Technology (Chair)
- Committee on Veterans' Affairs
  - Subcommittee on Health

== Electoral history ==
Virginia's 2nd congressional district
Year	Democratic	Votes	Pct	Republican	Votes	Pct	Independent	Votes	Pct
2008	Glenn Nye	141,857	52.40%	Thelma D. Drake	128,486	47.46%	*		
2010	Glenn Nye	70,306	42.46%	Scott Rigell	88,007	53.15%	Kenny E. Golden	7,158	4.32%

Write-in and minor candidate notes: In 2008, write-ins received 368 votes. In 2010, write-ins received 100 votes.

== Career after Congress ==
In March 2011 Glenn Nye accepted a position at the German Marshall Fund where he helped facilitate communications between the United States and Europe.

In September 2011 Glenn Nye joined the Hanover Investment Group as the Senior Political Advisor.

In December 2013, Glenn Nye became a trustee at the Center for the Study of the Presidency and Congress (CSPC), a non-partisan, non-profit Washington, D.C., think tank. In August 2017, Glenn Nye was named president and CEO of CSPC.

U.S. House of Representatives
Preceded by Thelma Drake	Member of the U.S. House of Representatives from Virginia's 2nd congressional district 2009–2011	Succeeded by Scott Rigell
U.S. order of precedence (ceremonial)
Preceded by Leslie Byrne as Former U.S. Representative	Order of precedence of the United States as Former U.S. Representative	Succeeded by Tom Perriello as Former U.S. Representative
