= Howard Copeland =

American lawyer and politician (1944–2019)

Howard Edgar Copeland (January 23, 1944 – April 11, 2019) was an American lawyer and politician from Virginia.

== Education and military career ==
Howard Copeland was raised in Norfolk, Virginia. His parents were Hubert Edgar Copeland and Helen Copeland. He attended Columbia University, graduating in 1967, and officer candidate school at the Coast Guard Reserve Training Center in Yorktown, Virginia. During his four years of active military service with the United States Coast Guard, Copeland was a combat information officer aboard the USCGC Androscoggin. Copeland remained a Coast Guard reservist for 22 years, retiring with the rank of captain. While serving in the military, Copeland attended the Naval War College and National Defense University, as well as the University of Virginia School of Law, where he completed a Juris Doctor in 1973.

== Legal and political career ==
Copeland became a special assistant to the attorney general in 1974, prior to working in a Norfolk-based private practice from 1975. He mounted an unsuccessful bid for a seat on the Norfolk City Council in 1978. Copeland ran for political office again in 1980, winning election to the Virginia House of Delegates, on which he served until losing reelection in 1995. During Copeland's 1995 legislative campaign, he altered a photograph of a bill-signing ceremony, giving the impression that only he was the only state legislator alongside Governor George Allen. Copeland's loss to Thelma Drake, whom he was facing for the second time, was considered a major upset, as the 87th House district was the only constituency in which a Republican candidate unseated a Democratic incumbent. Copeland subsequently returned to the practice of law, and was a special justice presiding over legal cases regarding mental health between 2015 and 2019.

== Health and death ==
Copeland was diagnosed with chordoma in August 2016, and died of the disease on April 11, 2019, aged 75.
