= Paula Miller =

American politician

Paula J. Miller
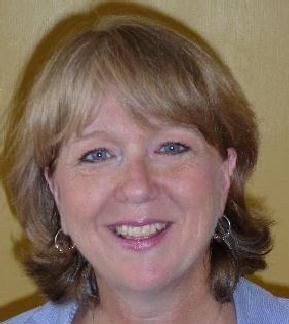

Member of the Virginia House of Delegates from the 87th district
- In office January 3, 2005 – January 11, 2012
- Preceded by: Thelma Drake
- Succeeded by: David Ramadan

Personal details
- Born: August 1, 1959 (age 67) Batavia, New York, U.S.
- Party: Democratic
- Spouse(s): George E. Schaefer, III
- Children: George E. Schaefer, IV; Molly Schaefer
- Education: Genesee Community College, State University of New York at Geneseo
- Occupation: Public information officer
- Committees: Militia, Police and Public Safety; Science and Technology
- Website: http://www.paula4virginia.com

Paula Jean Miller (born August 1, 1959) is an American politician. She was a Democratic member of the Virginia House of Delegates 2005–2012, representing the 87th district in the city of Norfolk. She ran unsuccessfully for the Democratic nomination for the special election to fill the seat being vacated by Ralph Northam, who was elected Lieutenant Governor of Virginia, in the Virginia Senate, District 6, representing portions of Norfolk, the Eastern Shore, and Virginia Beach. She lost to fellow delegate Lynwood Lewis.

== Early life ==
Miller graduated from Attica Central High School in Attica, New York in 1977, then earned degrees in mass communications from Genesee Community College (1979) and speech communication from SUNY Geneseo (1981). She then began working locally in broadcast journalism.

In 1984 Miller and her husband, George Schaefer, moved to Norfolk, Virginia, where she became a reporter for WTKR-TV, the local CBS affiliate. Miller worked at WTKR until 1999, when she took over the public information office of the Virginia Beach Sheriff's Office. She subsequently held the same job with the Norfolk Sheriff's Office.

Miller has two children, George Schaefer IV and Molly Schaefer. In 2007, George attended American Legion Boys Nation in Washington, D.C., and the Sorensen Institute for Political Leadership's High School Leadership Program in Charlottesville, Virginia.

== Electoral history ==
Date	Election	Candidate	Party	Votes	%
Virginia House of Delegates, 87th district
December 14, 2004	Special	Paula J. Miller	Democratic	3,862	50.07
December 14, 2004	Special	Michael L. Ball	Republican	3,765	48.81
December 14, 2004	Special	Write Ins		15	0.12
December 14, 2004	Special	Thelma Drake resigned; seat changed from Republican to Democratic			
November 8, 2005	General	P J Miller	Democratic	6,312	50.27
November 8, 2005	General	M L Ball	Republican	4,716	37.56
November 8, 2005	General	J A Coggeshall		1,515	12.07
November 8, 2005	General	Write Ins		13	0.10
November 6, 2007	General	Paula J. Miller	Democratic	5,248	54.04
November 6, 2007	General	Henry C. "Hank" Giffin III	Republican	4,446	45.78
November 6, 2007	General	Write Ins		17	0.17
November 3, 2009	General	Paula J. Miller	Democratic	6,693	56.61
November 3, 2009	General	John N. Amiral	Republican	5,111	43.23
November 3, 2009	General	Write Ins		17	0.14

== Political career ==
Miller's husband, George Schaefer, became heavily involved in Norfolk Republican politics, serving as local party chair and making unsuccessful bids to unseat 86th district Delegate George Heilig in 1993 and 1995. Due to her TV news job, Miller's role in Schaefer's campaigns was severely limited.

Schaefer switched political allegiances at the turn of the millennium and was elected Norfolk Clerk of Circuit Court as a Democrat in 2003. Now out of TV news, Miller was able to take an active role in his campaign.

Delegate Thelma Drake, a Republican, was elected to the United States House of Representatives in November 2004, creating a vacancy in the 87th district, where Miller's house was then located. She decided to run and was unopposed for the Democratic nomination. In the special election on December 14, she narrowly defeated Michael Ball, the local Republican chair and a professional fundraiser for conservative televangelist Pat Robertson's Regent University. Miller stressed the need for bipartisan solutions to such issues as transportation and the environment, in the manner of Democratic Governor Mark Warner; Ball emphasized his conservative credentials and his potential for delivering for the district as a member of the House majority.

In 2005 she won reelection in a three-way race with Ball and independent John Coggeshall, a local lawyer, cabaret entertainer and radio talk show host. In 2007 she defeated retired Vice Admiral Henry C. "Hank" Giffin III, and in 2009 she defeated Republican John Amiral, a former Navy officer, to return for her third term in Richmond.

In 2011, Miller was redistricted into House district 100 along with fellow Democrat Lynwood Lewis. She did not run that year. The 87th district, which was moved to northern Virginia, was won by Republican David Ramadan.

Miller considered a run for Lieutenant Governor of Virginia in 2013, but chose not to. Following Ralph Northam's election as Lieutenant Governor, Miller announced she would run to be the Democratic nominee in the special election for Northam's seat in the Virginia Senate.
