= Suhas Subramanyam =

American politician (born 1986)

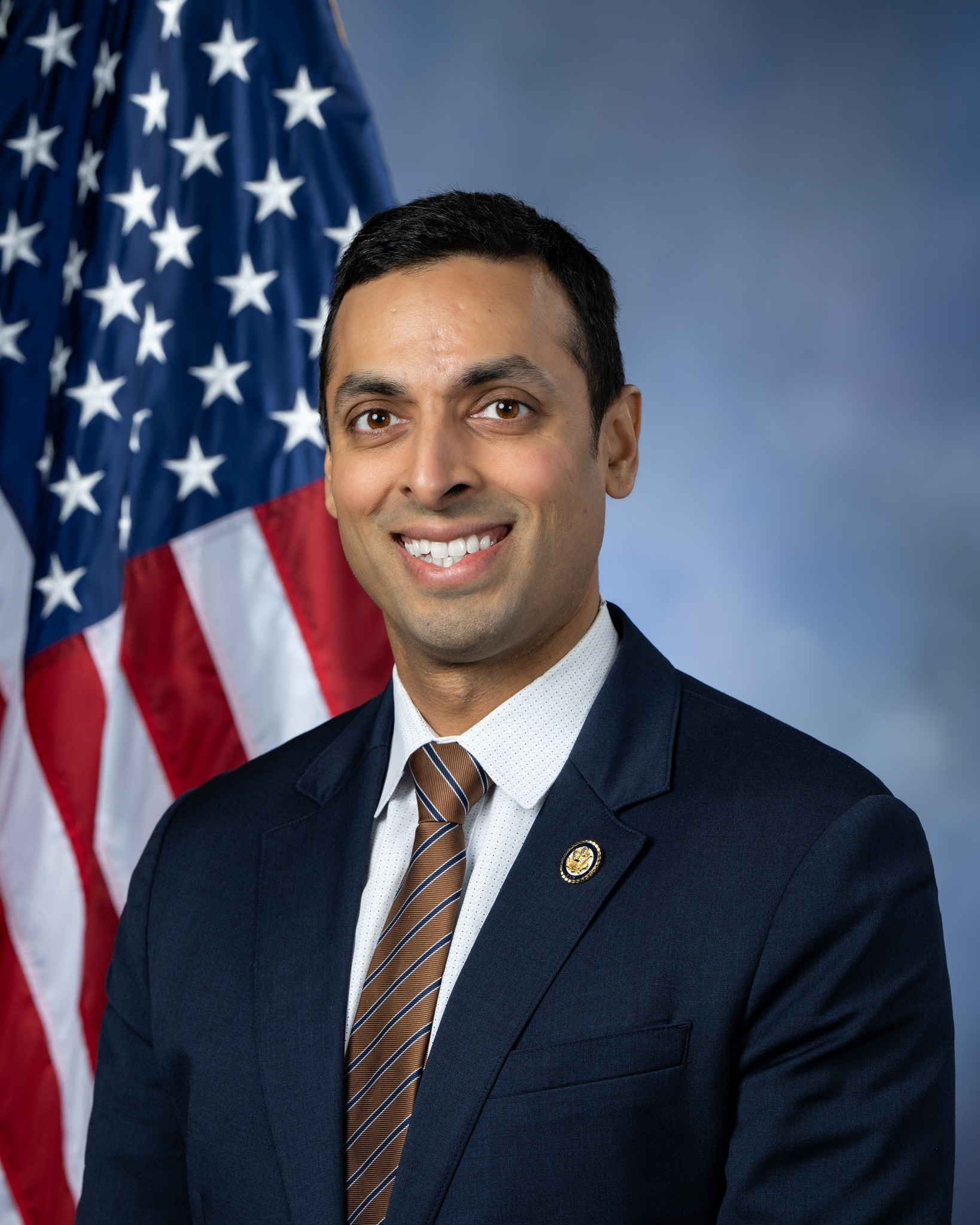
- Official portrait, 2025

Member of the U.S. House of Representatives from Virginia's 10th district
- Incumbent
- Assumed office January 3, 2025
- Preceded by: Jennifer Wexton

Member of the Virginia Senate from the 32nd district
- In office January 10, 2024 – January 3, 2025
- Preceded by: John Bell (redistricted)
- Succeeded by: Kannan Srinivasan

Member of the Virginia House of Delegates from the 87th district
- In office January 8, 2020 – January 10, 2024
- Preceded by: John Bell
- Succeeded by: Jeion Ward

Personal details
- Born: September 26, 1986 (age 40) Houston, Texas, U.S.
- Party: Democratic
- Spouse: Miranda Peña (m. 2018)
- Children: 2
- Education: Tulane University (BA); Northwestern University (JD)
- Website: House website Campaign website

Suhas Subramanyam (born September 26, 1986) is an American politician and attorney serving as the U.S. representative for Virginia's 10th congressional district since 2025. A member of the Democratic Party, he previously served in the Virginia Senate from 2024 to 2025 and in the Virginia House of Delegates from 2020 to 2024.

After working as a White House advisor during the Obama administration, Subramanyam became the first South Asian American elected to the Virginia General Assembly in 2019. He was elected to the Virginia Senate in 2023, representing the 32nd district.

In 2024, Subramanyam was elected to the U.S. House of Representatives, succeeding Jennifer Wexton. He was re-elected in 2026. His district covers the Northern Virginia exurbs of Washington, D.C., including all of Loudoun, Fauquier, and Rappahannock counties, portions of Fairfax and Prince William counties, and the independent cities of Manassas and Manassas Park.

== Early life and education ==
Subramanyam was born in Houston, Texas, to Tamil physician parents who emigrated from India. His mother is a native of Bengaluru, Karnataka, while his father grew up in Madras, since renamed Chennai, Madras State, now Tamil Nadu, and Secunderabad, Telangana. He attended Clear Lake High School and earned his bachelor's degree in philosophy, summa cum laude, from Tulane University in 2008. After college, he worked as a legislative aide, and then went to Northwestern University Pritzker School of Law, where he earned his Juris Doctor in 2013. While in law school, he helped overturn the wrongful conviction of a man sentenced to life in prison.

== Career ==
Subramanyam began his career in public service as a legislative staffer, working for U.S. Representative Suzanne Kosmas of Florida. While in law school, he clerked for the U.S. Senate Judiciary Committee for Senator Dick Durbin, helping him reintroduce the DREAM Act.

In 2015, Subramanyam was appointed to serve as a White House technology policy advisor in the administration of President Barack Obama. He led a task force on technology policy that addressed job creation, IT modernization, and regulating emerging technology.

After leaving the White House, Subramanyam practiced law and was a business owner in the technology sector.

== Virginia House of Delegates ==
=== Elections ===
In the 2019 Virginia House of Delegates election, Subramanyam ran to succeed Democrat John Bell for the 87th district, who left the seat to run for the 13th district of the Virginia Senate. He faced a crowded primary, running against three other first-generation Americans. He won the primary with 47.0% of the vote.

In the general election, Subramanyam ran on a platform to improve education, healthcare, and traffic in the region and across Virginia. Subramanyam went on to win the general election with 62.0% of the vote.

In the 2021 Virginia House of Delegates election, Subramanyam won a second term representing the 87th district by defeating Republican Gregory Moulthrop by double digits.

=== Tenure ===
In 2021, he co-founded the General Assembly's first Asian American and Pacific Islander Caucus. He is also the co-founder and co-chair of Virginia Commonwealth Caucus, a group of lawmakers seeking to increase bipartisanship.

== U.S. House of Representatives ==
=== Elections ===
==== 2024 ====
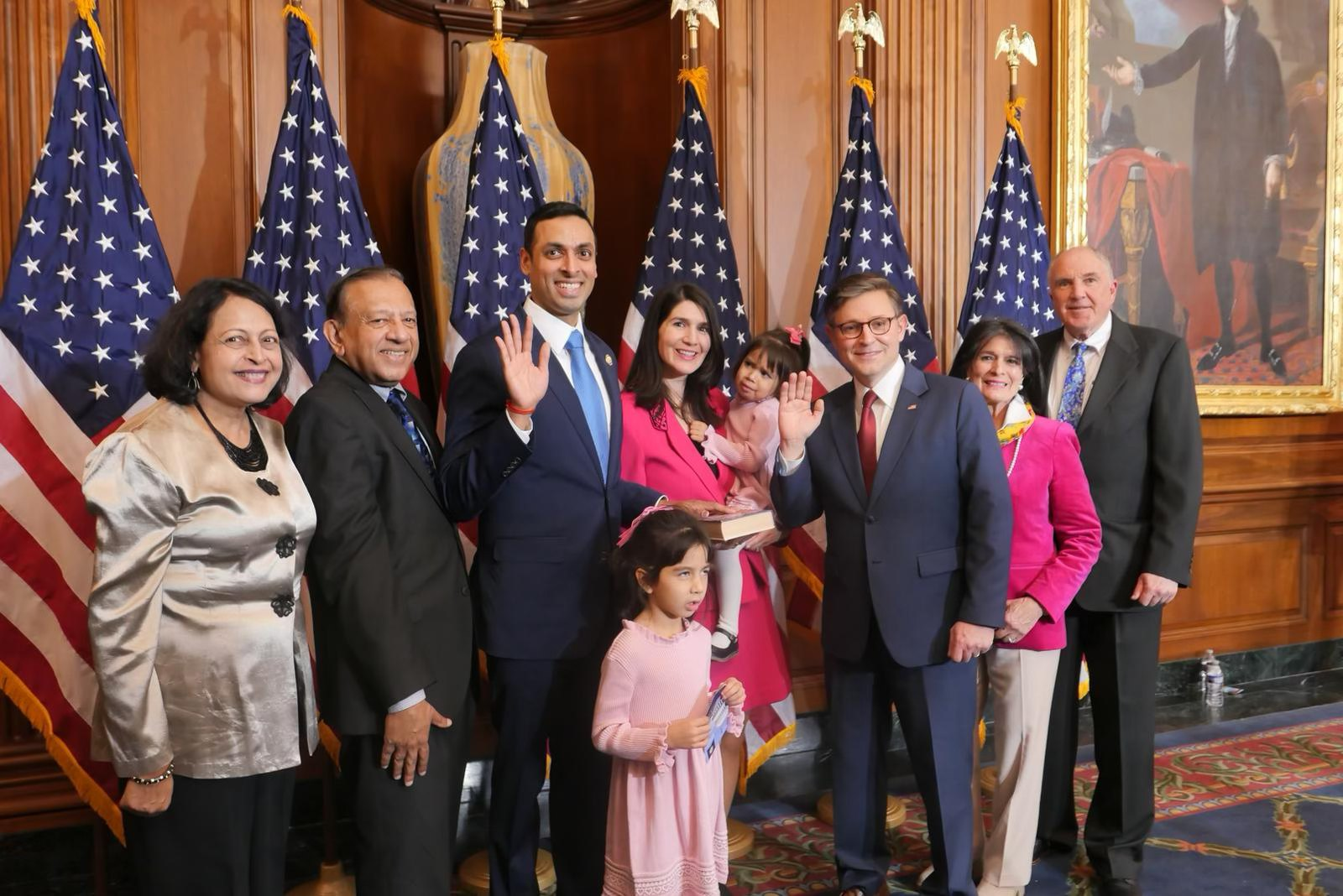
Subramanyam is sworn into the 119th Congress, 2025

In November 2023, he announced his candidacy for the United States House of Representatives in the 2024 election to succeed Jennifer Wexton of the 10th district. He was endorsed by Jennifer Wexton to succeed her. On June 18, 2024, Subramnyam won the Democratic primary for Virginia's 10th congressional district, defeating 11 other candidates, including State Delegate Dan Helmer who finished second. Subramanyam won Virginia's 10th congressional district election on November 5, 2024, defeating Republican Mike Clancy by 18,893 votes.

The district is anchored in the outer portion of Northern Virginia and includes all of Loudoun, Fauquier, and Rappahannock counties, portions of Fairfax and Prince William counties, and the independent cities of Manassas and Manassas Park.

==== 2026 ====
Subramanyam was unopposed in the Democratic primary and was heavily favored to defeat Republican nominee Dave Beckwith in the general election, ultimately winning re-election on November 3.

=== Tenure ===
Subramanyam was sworn in on January 3, 2025, as the U.S. representative for Virginia’s 10th congressional district. Subramanyam voted for the Laken Riley Act in January 2025.

In February 2025, he introduced the LEASH DOGE Act, which would require the Department of Government Efficiency to report on its actions and its impact. Subramanyam criticized the department's actions under Elon Musk's leadership as unconstitutional.

=== Committee assignments ===
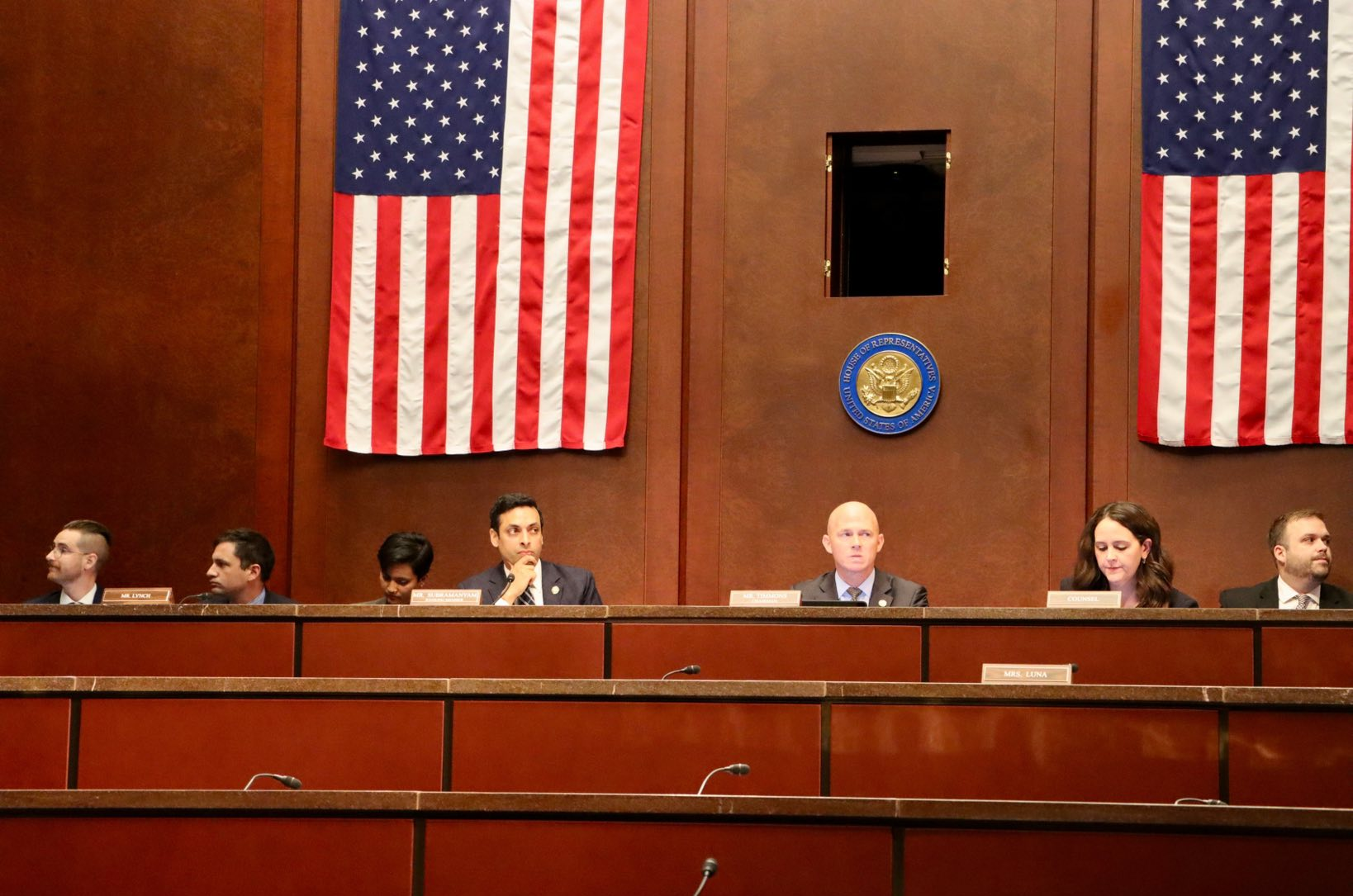
Subramanyam on the Oversight Committee, 2025

Subramanyam's committee assignments for the 119th Congress include:

- Committee on Science, Space, and Technology
  - Subcommittee on Research and Technology
  - Subcommittee on Energy
- Committee on Oversight and Government Reform
  - Subcommittee on Cybersecurity, Information Technology, and Government Innovation
  - Subcommittee on Delivering on Government Efficiency
  - Subcommittee on Military and Foreign Affairs (Ranking Member)
- Committee on Ethics

=== Caucus memberships ===
Subramanyam's caucus memberships include:

- Future Forum
- Congressional Equality Caucus
- New Democrat Coalition
- Congressional Asian Pacific American Caucus
- Rare Disease Caucus
- House Baltic Caucus
- Taiwan Caucus
- Agritourism Caucus (co-chair)

=== Hindu nationalist ties ===
Subramanyam has accepted financial support and endorsement from the Hindu American PAC, a Hindu nationalist aligned donor network.

== Personal life ==
Subramanyam lives in Ashburn, Virginia, with his wife, Miranda Peña, whom he married in 2018. They have two daughters. He was a member of the Loudoun Health Council and also served as a volunteer EMT and firefighter. He is Hindu.

== Electoral history ==
Virginia House of Delegates primary election: 87th District, 2019
Party	Candidate	Votes	%
Democratic	Suhas Subramanyam	3,052	47.2%
Democratic	Johanna L. Gusman	1,207	18.7%
Democratic	Hassan M. Ahmad	1,502	23.2%
Democratic	Akshay Bhamidipati	701	10.9%
Total votes		6,488	100.0%

Virginia House of Delegates election: 87th District, 2019
Party	Candidate	Votes	%
Democratic	Suhas Subramanyam	17,693	62.0%
Republican	William M. Drennan Jr.	10,818	37.9%
Total votes		28,539	100.0%

Virginia House of Delegates election: 87th District, 2021
Party	Candidate	Votes	%
Democratic	Suhas Subramanyam (Incumbent)	24,348	58.4%
Republican	Gregory Jon Moulthrop	17,273	41.4%
Total votes		41,677	100.0%

Virginia Senate Democratic primary election: 32nd District, 2023
Party	Candidate	Votes	%
Democratic	Suhas Subramanyam	11,178	73.7%
Democratic	Ibraheem S. Samirah	4,000	26.4%
Total votes		15,178	100.0%

Virginia Senate election: 32nd District, 2023
Party	Candidate	Votes	%
Democratic	Suhas Subramanyam	36,590	60.6%
Republican	Gregory J. Moulthrop	23,541	39.0%
Total votes		60,431	100.0%

Primary results by county: * Subramanyam: Blue * Helmer: Green * Maldonado: Pink

United States House of Representatives Democratic primary election: 10th District, 2024
Party	Candidate	Votes	%
Democratic	Suhas Subramanyam	13,504	30.4%
Democratic	Dan Helmer	11,784	26.6%
Democratic	Atif Qarni	4,768	10.7%
Democratic	Eileen Filler-Corn	4,131	9.3%
Democratic	Jennifer Boysko	4,016	9.0%
Democratic	David Reid	1,419	3.2%
Democratic	Michelle Maldonado	1,412	3.2%
Democratic	Adrian Pokharel	1,028	2.3%
Democratic	Krystle Kaul	982	2.2%
Democratic	Travis Nembhard	722	1.6%
Democratic	Marion Devoe	386	0.9%
Democratic	Mark Leighton	225	0.5%
Total votes		44,377	100.0%

United States House of Representatives election: 10th District, 2024
Party	Candidate	Votes	%
Democratic	Suhas Subramanyam	210,790	52.3%
Republican	Mike Clancy	191,897	47.7%
Total votes		402,687	100.0%

== See also ==
- List of Asian Americans and Pacific Islands Americans in the United States Congress
- List of Indian Americans
- Asian Americans in politics

U.S. House of Representatives
Preceded by Jennifer Wexton	Member of the U.S. House of Representatives from Virginia's 10th congressional district 2025–present	Incumbent
U.S. order of precedence (ceremonial)
Preceded by Lateefah Simon	United States representatives by seniority 418th	Succeeded by David Taylor
