= Thelma Drake =

American politician (born 1949)

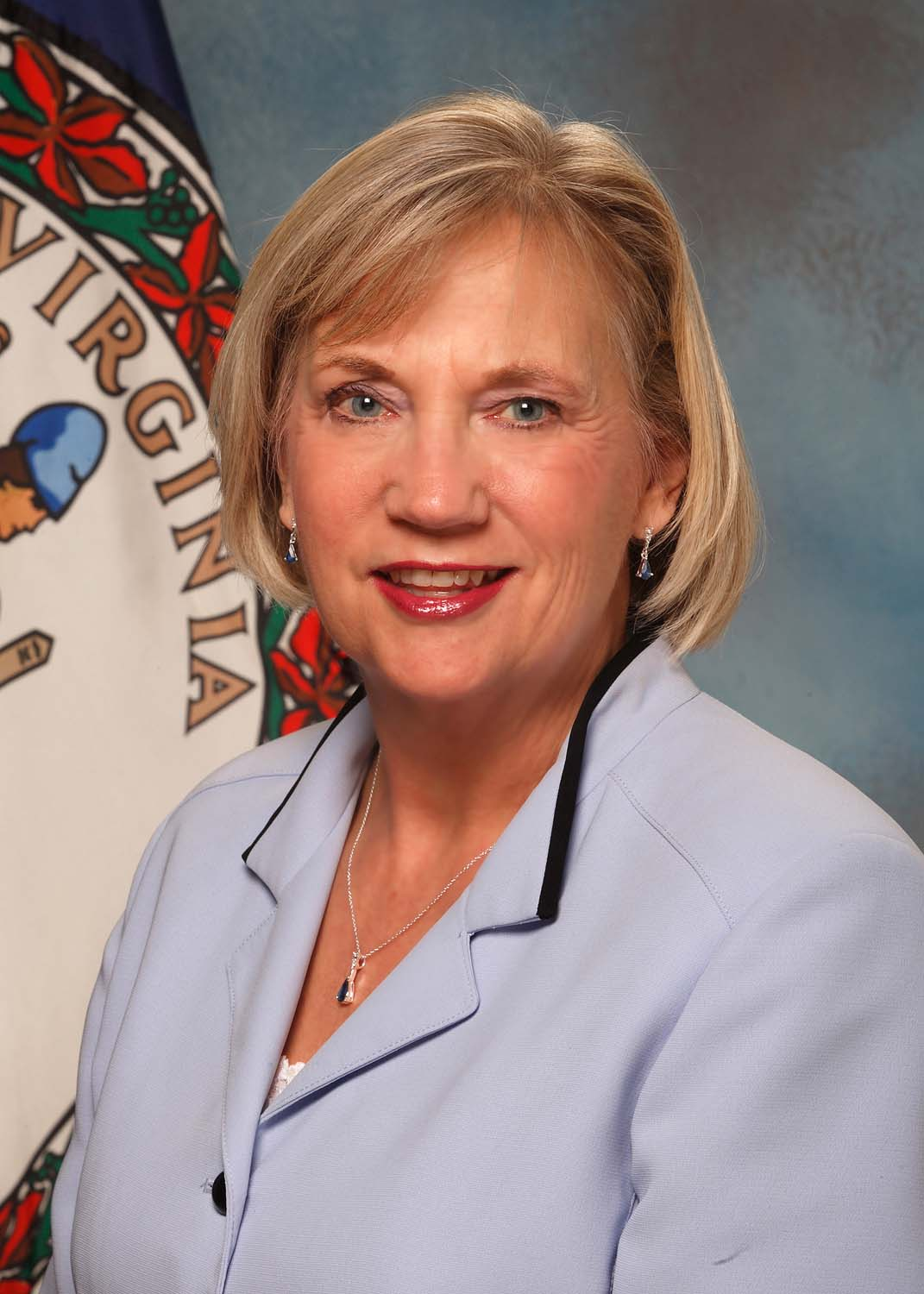

Member of the U.S. House of Representatives from Virginia's 2nd district
- In office January 3, 2005 – January 3, 2009
- Preceded by: Ed Schrock
- Succeeded by: Glenn Nye

Member of the Virginia House of Delegates from the 87th district
- In office January 10, 1996 – January 3, 2005
- Preceded by: Howard Copeland
- Succeeded by: Paula Miller

Personal details
- Born: Thelma Day; November 20, 1949 (age 76) Elyria, Ohio, U.S.
- Party: Republican
- Spouse: Ted Drake
- Children: 2
- Education: Old Dominion University

Thelma Day Drake (born November 20, 1949) is an American politician and former member of Congress for Virginia's 2nd congressional district. A Republican, she served in the U.S. House of Representatives from 2005 to 2009. Prior to serving in Congress, Thelma Drake served nine years in the Virginia House of Delegates.

After leaving Congress, Drake was appointed to be Director of the Virginia Department of Rail and Public Transportation by Governor Robert McDonnell, and later became Assistant Director of Public Works Transportation Division for the City of Norfolk. She also worked as a real estate agent in the Hampton Roads region. On February 15, 2018, Drake was nominated by President Donald Trump as the Administrator of the Federal Transit Administration. On January 3, 2019, the nomination expired. On January 16, 2019, she was renominated to the same office. The nomination expired on January 3, 2020 and she was not renominated.

== Early life and education ==
Thelma Drake was born Thelma Mary Day in Elyria, Ohio to parents Harry Elwood Day and Ephram O'Brien Day. She attended both Elyria Catholic High School and Elyria High School. She later attended Old Dominion University in Norfolk, Virginia.

== Career ==
=== Virginia House of Delegates ===
In 1995 Drake became the second Republican to be elected to represent the City of Norfolk in the Virginia House of Delegates since the Reconstruction era. She served in the House of Delegates for nine years representing the 87th District. Drake served as chair of the Virginia Housing Commission and as a member of the Chesapeake Bay Commission.

=== U.S. Congress ===
Drake was elected to the United States House of Representatives in 2004. She entered the race after incumbent Republican congressman Ed Schrock ended his re-election campaign. Drake defeated Democratic Party candidate, David Ashe, in the general election, becoming the third woman to represent Virginia in Congress after Leslie Byrne and Jo Ann Davis.

In 2006, Drake defeated Democratic Party candidate, Phillip Kellam, 51% to 49%.

In 2008, Drake was defeated by Democratic nominee Glenn Nye.

== Personal life ==
She is married to Ted Drake and lives in the East Ocean View area of Norfolk, Virginia.

== Electoral history ==
Virginia's 2nd congressional district election, 2004
Party	Candidate	Votes	%
Republican	Thelma D. Drake	132,946	55.08%
Democratic	David B. Ashe	108,180	44.82%
Write-in		254	0.11%
Total votes		241,380	100%
Republican hold			

Virginia's 2nd congressional district election, 2006
Party	Candidate	Votes	%
Republican	Thelma D. Drake (Incumbent)	88,777	51.27%
Democratic	Phil Kellam	83,901	48.45%
Write-in		481	0.28%
Total votes		173,159	100%
Republican hold			

Virginia's 2nd congressional district election, 2008
Party	Candidate	Votes	%
Democratic	Glenn Nye	141,857	52.40%
Republican	Thelma D. Drake (Incumbent)	128,486	47.46%
Write-in		368	0.14%
Total votes		270,711	100%
Democratic gain from Republican			

U.S. House of Representatives
Preceded by Ed Schrock	Member of the U.S. House of Representatives from Virginia's 2nd congressional district 2005–2009	Succeeded by Glenn Nye
U.S. order of precedence (ceremonial)
Preceded by Ed Schrock as Former U.S. Representative	Order of precedence of the United States as Former U.S. Representative	Succeeded by Dave Brat as Former U.S. Representative
