= 2020 United States House of Representatives elections in Virginia =

- November 3, 2020

All 11 Virginia seats to the United States House of Representatives
	Majority party	Minority party
Party	Democratic	Republican
Last election	7	4
Seats won	7	4
Seat change	Steady	Steady
Popular vote	2,253,974	2,047,928
Percentage	52.20%	47.42%
Swing	▼4.49%	▲4.65%

Democratic
50–60%
60–70%
70–80%
80–90%
Republican
50–60%
60–70%
70–80%
80–90%
90–100%

The 2020 United States House of Representatives elections in Virginia was held on November 3, 2020, to elect the 11 U.S. representatives from the state of Virginia, one from each of the state's 11 congressional districts. The elections coincided with the 2020 U.S. presidential election, as well as other elections to the House of Representatives, elections to the United States Senate, and various state and local elections.

== Statewide results ==
Party	Candidates	Votes		Seats		
Party	Candidates	No.	%	No.	+/–	%
Democratic Party	10	2,253,974	52.20%	7	Steady	63.64%
Republican Party	11	2,047,928	47.42%	4	Steady	36.36%
Independent	1	9,170	0.21%	0	Steady	0.0%
Write-in	11	7,234	0.17%	0	Steady	0.0%
Total	33	4,318,306	100%	11	Steady	100%

Statewide popular vote
Democratic	52.20%
Republican	47.42%
Independent	0.21%
Write-in	0.17%

House seats
Democratic	63.64%
Republican	36.36%

=== By district ===
District	Democratic		Republican		Others		Total		Result
District	Votes	%	Votes	%	Votes	%	Votes	%	Result
District 1	186,923	41.71%	260,614	58.15%	641	0.14%	448,178	100.0%	Republican hold
District 2	185,733	51.55%	165,031	45.81%	9,513	2.64%	360,277	100.0%	Democratic hold
District 3	233,326	68.35%	107,299	31.43%	736	0.22%	341,361	100.0%	Democratic hold
District 4	241,142	61.62%	149,625	38.23%	578	0.15%	391,345	100.0%	Democratic hold
District 5	190,315	47.31%	210,988	52.44%	1,014	0.25%	402,317	100.0%	Republican hold
District 6	134,729	35.29%	246,606	64.59%	478	0.12%	381,813	100.0%	Republican hold
District 7	230,893	50.82%	222,623	49.00%	823	0.18%	454,339	100.0%	Democratic hold
District 8	301,454	75.79%	95,365	23.98%	926	0.23%	397,745	100.0%	Democratic hold
District 9	0	0.00%	271,851	93.98%	17,423	6.02%	289,274	100.0%	Republican hold
District 10	268,734	56.51%	206,253	43.37%	559	0.12%	475,546	100.0%	Democratic hold
District 11	280,725	71.39%	111,380	28.32%	1,136	0.29%	393,241	100.0%	Democratic hold
Total	2,253,974	51.99%	2,047,635	47.23%	33,827	0.78%	4,335,436	100.0%	

== District 1 ==
2020 Virginia's 1st congressional district election
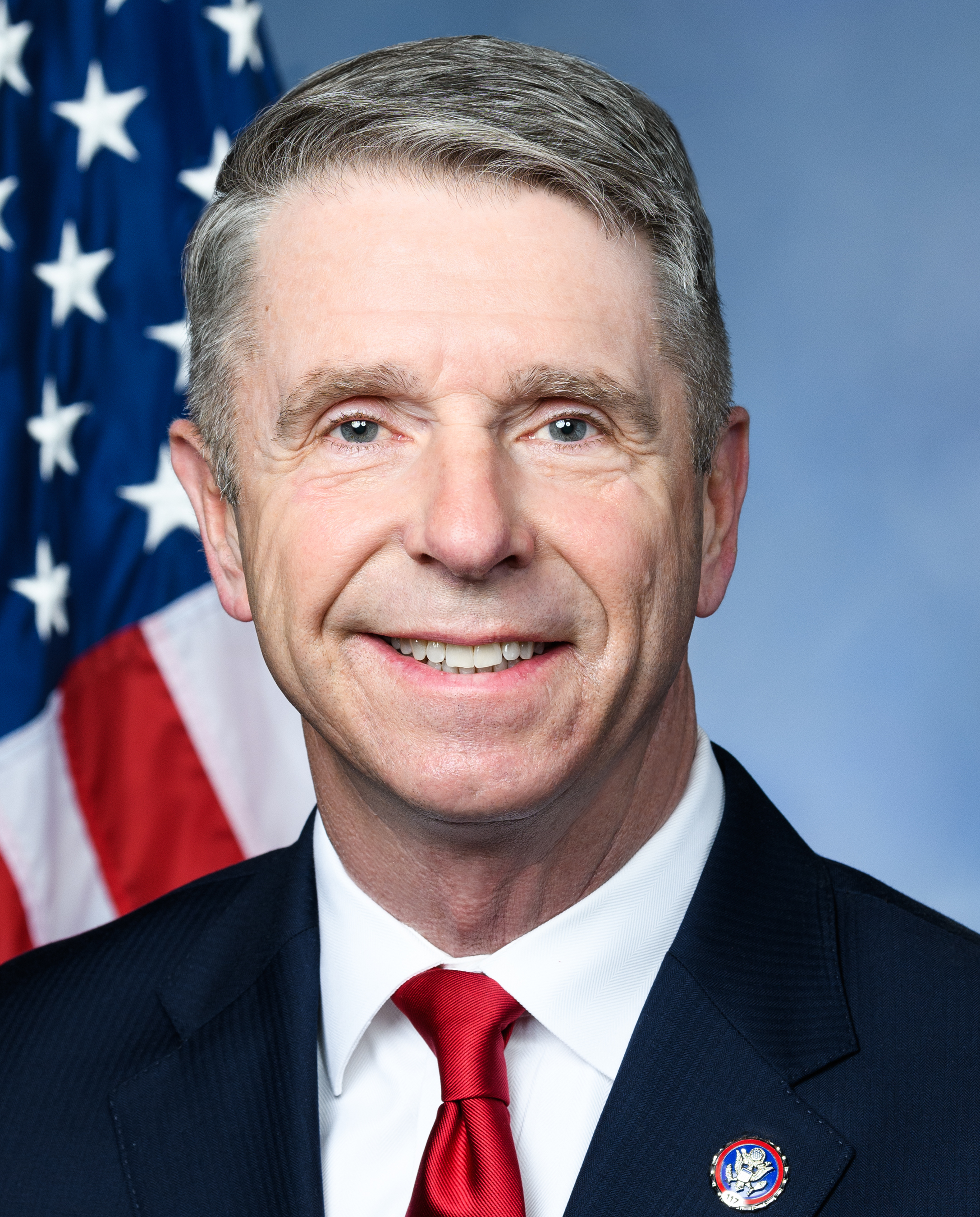

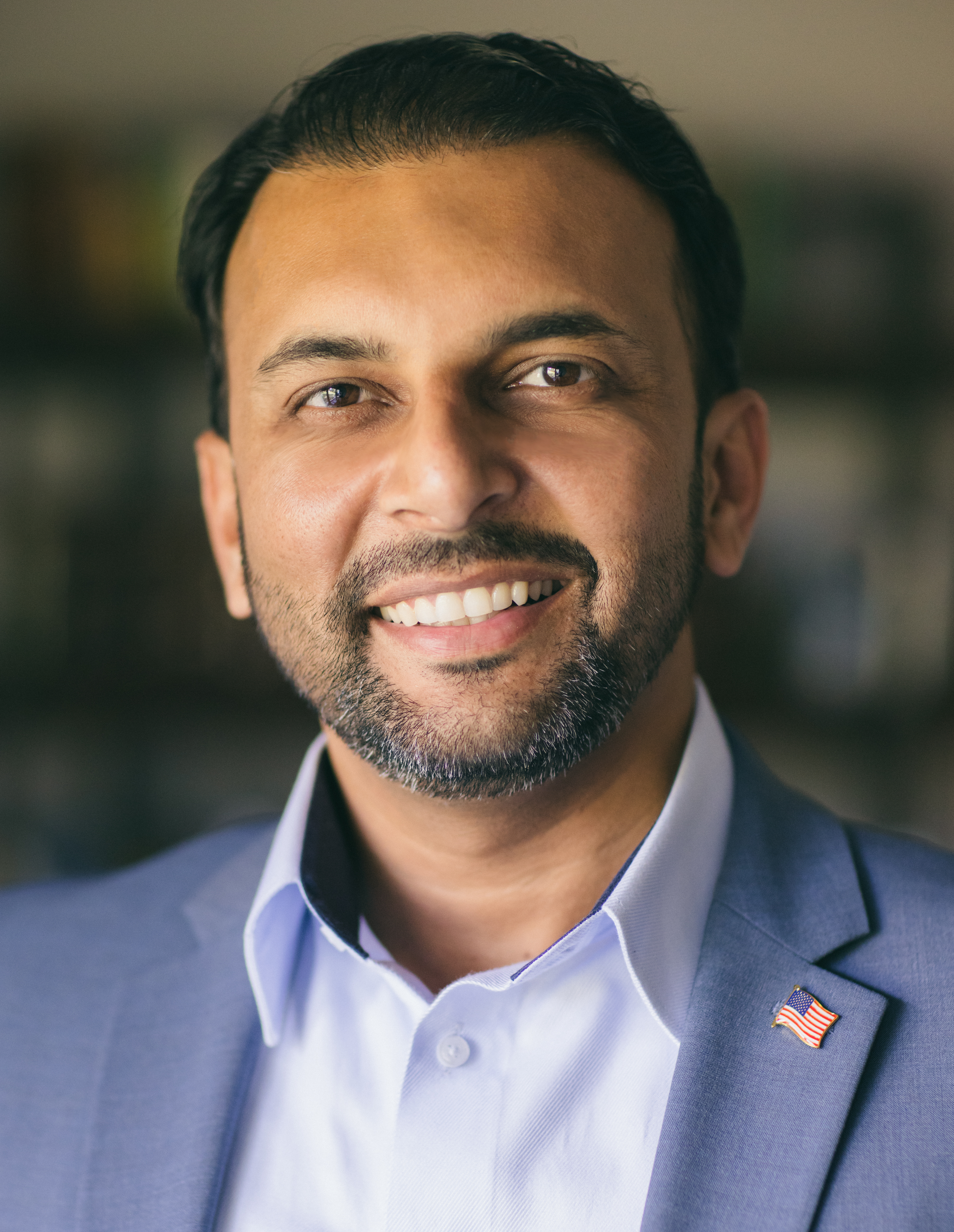
Nominee	Rob Wittman	Qasim Rashid
Party	Republican	Democratic
Popular vote	260,907	186,923
Percentage	58.2%	41.7%
- Wittman: 40–50% 50–60% 60–70% 70–80% 80–90% >90% Rashid: 50–60% 60–70% 70–80% >90%
U.S. Representative before election
Rob Wittman
Republican
Elected U.S. Representative
Rob Wittman
Republican

The 1st district is based in the western Chesapeake Bay, taking in the exurbs and suburbs of Washington, D.C., and Richmond, including Fredericksburg, Mechanicsville, and Montclair. The incumbent was Republican Rob Wittman, who was re-elected with 55.2% of the vote in 2018.

=== Republican primary ===
==== Candidates ====
===== Nominee =====
- Rob Wittman, incumbent U.S. representative

=== Democratic primary ===
==== Candidates ====
===== Nominee =====
- Qasim Rashid, human rights lawyer and nominee for Virginia's 28th Senate district in 2019

==== Eliminated in primary ====
- Vangie Williams, strategic planner and nominee for Virginia's 1st congressional district in 2018

=== Endorsements ===
Qasim Rashid

Federal officials

- André Carson, U.S. representative (IN-7), second Muslim to enter Congress
- Julián Castro, former Secretary of Housing and Urban Development (2014–2017) and former mayor of San Antonio
- Gerry Connolly, U.S. representative (VA-11)
- Tim Kaine, U.S. senator from Virginia, former governor of Virginia (2006–2010), and Democratic vice presidential candidate in 2016
- Grace Meng, U.S. representative (NY-6)
- Bobby Scott, U.S. representative (VA-3)
- Jackie Speier, U.S. representative (CA-14)
- Eric Swalwell, U.S. representative (CA-15)
- Mark Warner, U.S. senator from Virginia
- Elizabeth Warren, U.S. senator from Massachusetts

State officials

- Mark Herring, current attorney general of Virginia
- Ralph Northam, current governor of Virginia

Local officials

- Pete Buttigieg, former mayor of South Bend, Indiana (2012–2020) and former candidate for 2020 Democratic presidential nomination
- Babur Lateef, Prince William County, Virginia School Board chair
- Lisa Zargarpur, Prince William County, Virginia School Board member

Individuals

- Herb Jones, former state senate candidate and former New Kent County, Virginia, treasurer
- Nyesha Whitten-Wilson, actor and activist

Organizations

- BRADY PAC
- End Citizens United
- Humanity Forward
- Let America Vote
- People for the American Way
- Sierra Club
- Sunrise Movement
- Sunrise Movement Virginia
- Virginia AFL–CIO
Vangie Williams

State officials

- Mamie Locke, state senator
- Louise Lucas, state senator
- Shelly Simonds, state delegate
- Suhas Subramanyam, state delegate

Local officials

- Brian Fields, Dumfries, Virginia, town council member
- Selonia Miles, Dumfries, Virginia, town council member
- Cydny A. Neville, Dumfries, Virginia, town council member
- Monae Nickerson, vice mayor of Dumfries, Virginia
- Derrick Woods, mayor of Dumfries, Virginia

Organizations

- National Organization for Women Political Action Committee (NOW PAC)

Individuals

- Gene Rossi, prosecutor and former candidate for lieutenant governor of Virginia

==== Primary results ====
County and independent city results Rashid: 50–60%; 60–70%; Williams: 50–60%; 60–70%; 70–80%

Democratic primary results
Party	Candidate	Votes	%
Democratic	Qasim Rashid	21,625	52.5
Democratic	Vangie Williams	19,545	47.5
Total votes		41,170	100.0

=== General election ===
==== Predictions ====
Source	Ranking	As of
The Cook Political Report	Safe R	July 2, 2020
Inside Elections	Safe R	June 2, 2020
Sabato's Crystal Ball	Safe R	July 2, 2020
Politico	Likely R	April 19, 2020
Daily Kos	Safe R	June 3, 2020
RCP	Safe R	June 9, 2020
Niskanen	Safe R	June 7, 2020

==== Results ====
Virginia's 1st congressional district, 2020 (Note: On January 11, 2024, the Prince William County Office of Elections issued a notice that the election results in the county were improperly reported. The error caused Wittman's countywide votes to be underreported by 293 votes. See here.)
Party	Candidate	Votes	%
Republican	Rob Wittman (incumbent)	260,907	58.18
Democratic	Qasim Rashid	186,923	41.68
Write-in		641	0.14
Total votes		448,471	100.0
Republican hold			

== District 2 ==
2020 Virginia's 2nd congressional district election
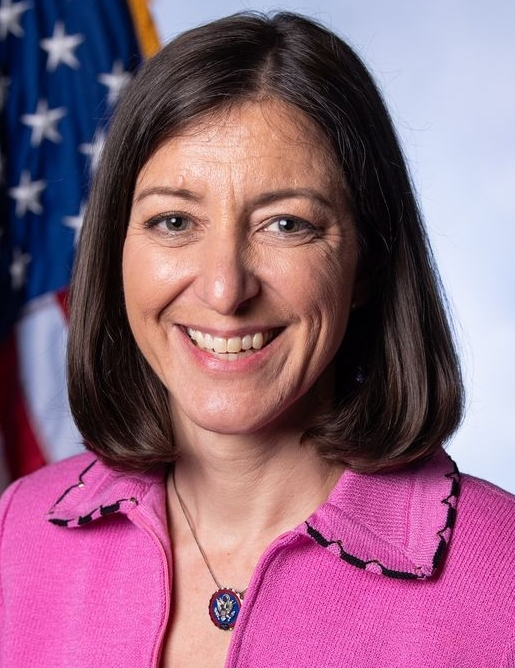

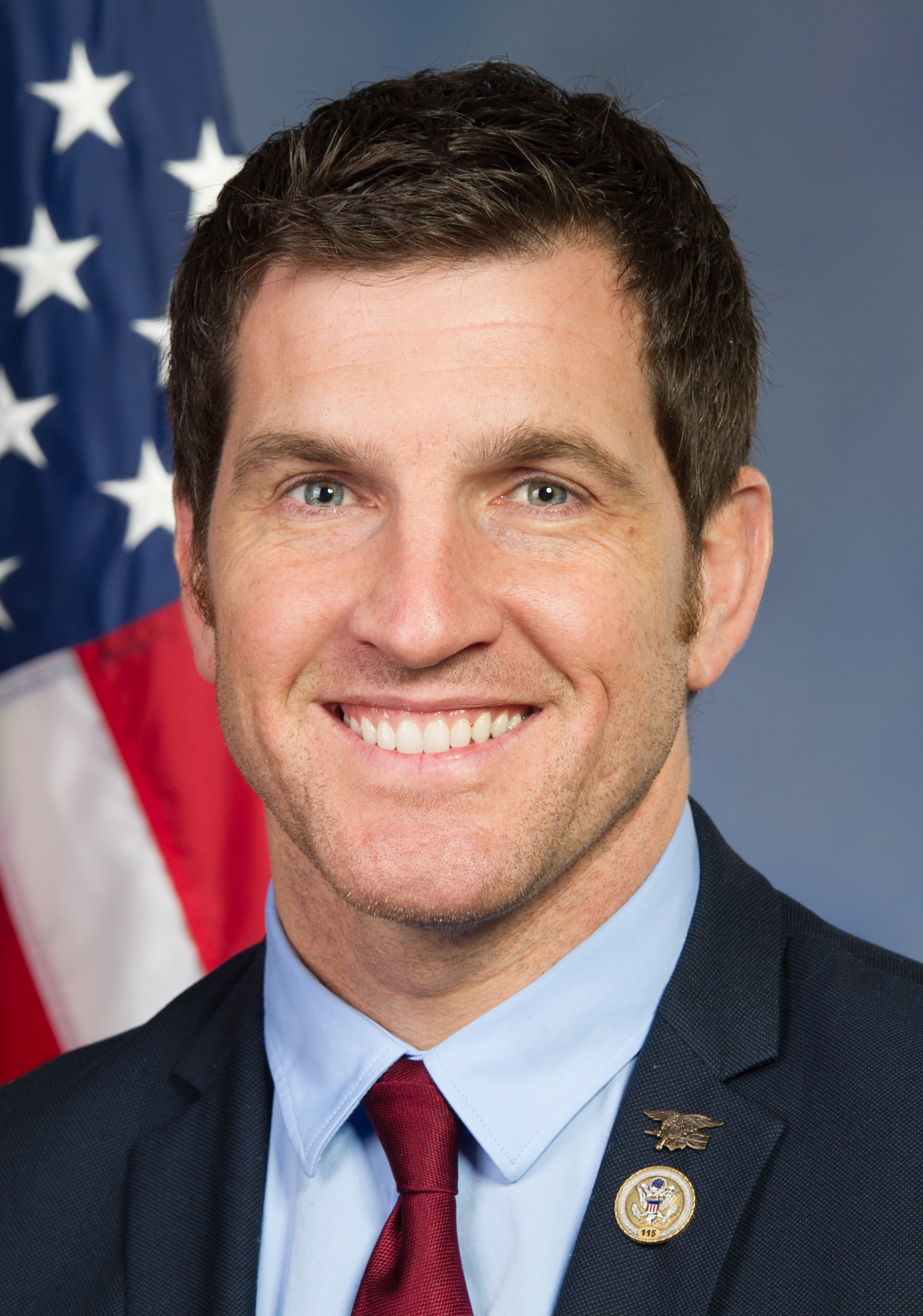
Nominee	Elaine Luria	Scott Taylor
Party	Democratic	Republican
Popular vote	185,733	165,031
Percentage	51.6%	45.8%
- Luria: 40–50% 50–60% 60–70% 70–80% 80–90% Taylor: 40–50% 50–60% 60–70% 70–80%
U.S. Representative before election
Elaine Luria
Democratic
Elected U.S. Representative
Elaine Luria
Democratic

The 2nd district is based in Hampton Roads, containing the cities of Norfolk, Virginia Beach, and Hampton. The incumbent was Democrat Elaine Luria, who flipped the district and was elected with 51.1% of the vote in 2018.

=== Democratic primary ===
==== Candidates ====
===== Nominee =====
- Elaine Luria, incumbent U.S. representative (2019–2023)

===== Endorsements =====
Elaine Luria

Executive branch officials

- Barack Obama, former president of the United States (2009–2017)

Organizations

- 314 Action
- Black Economic Alliance
- Brady Campaign
- EMILY's List
- League of Conservation Voters Action Fund
- NARAL Pro-Choice America
- New Democrat Coalition
- Planned Parenthood Action Fund
- Sierra Club

=== Republican primary ===
==== Candidates ====
===== Nominee =====
- Scott Taylor, former U.S. representative for Virginia's 2nd congressional district (2017–2019)

==== Eliminated in primary ====
- Jarome Bell, U.S. Navy veteran
- Ben Loyola, defense contractor and U.S. Navy veteran

===== Withdrawn =====
- Andy Baan, cybersecurity expert

==== Primary results ====
County and independent city results Taylor: 40–50%; 50–60%

Republican primary results
Party	Candidate	Votes	%
Republican	Scott Taylor	25,478	48.5
Republican	Ben Loyola	15,420	29.4
Republican	Jarome Bell	10,616	22.1
Total votes		51,514	100.0

=== General election ===
==== Predictions ====
Source	Ranking	As of
The Cook Political Report	Lean D	October 21, 2020
Inside Elections	Likely D	October 28, 2020
Sabato's Crystal Ball	Lean D	July 2, 2020
Politico	Lean D	November 2, 2020
Daily Kos	Lean D	June 3, 2020
RCP	Tossup	June 9, 2020
Niskanen	Lean D	June 7, 2020

==== Polling ====
Poll source	Date(s) administered	Sample size (Note: Key: A – all adults RV – registered voters LV – likely voters V – unclear)	Margin of error	Elaine Luria (D)	Scott Taylor (R)	Other	Undecided
Christopher Newport University	October 8–18, 2020	807 (LV)	± 3.8%	50%	43%	1% (Note: "Someone else" with 1%)	6%
Tarrance Group (R) (Note: Poll conducted for the Congressional Leadership Fund.)	July 14–16, 2020	405 (LV)	± 4.9%	48%	48%	–	4%

==== Results ====
Virginia's 2nd congressional district, 2020
Party	Candidate	Votes	%
Democratic	Elaine Luria (incumbent)	185,733	51.6
Republican	Scott Taylor	165,031	45.8
Independent	David Foster	9,170	2.5
Write-in		343	0.1
Total votes		360,277	100.0
Democratic hold			

== District 3 ==
2020 Virginia's 3rd congressional district election
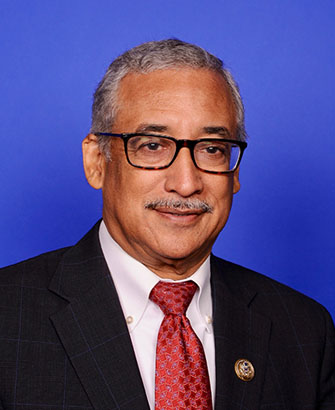

Nominee	Bobby Scott	John Collick
Party	Democratic	Republican
Popular vote	233,326	107,299
Percentage	68.4%	31.4%
- Scott: 50–60% 60–70% 70–80% 80–90% >90% Collick: 40–50% 50–60% 60–70% 70–80%
U.S. Representative before election
Bobby Scott
Democratic
Elected U.S. Representative
Bobby Scott
Democratic

The 3rd district encompasses the inner Hampton Roads, including parts of Hampton and Norfolk, as well as Newport News. The incumbent was Democrat Bobby Scott, who was reelected with 91.2% of the vote in 2018 without major-party opposition.

=== Democratic primary ===
==== Candidates ====
===== Nominee =====
- Bobby Scott, incumbent U.S. representative

=== Republican primary ===
==== Candidates ====
===== Nominee =====
- John Collick, U.S. Marine Corps veteran

==== Eliminated in primary ====
- Madison Downs, teacher
- George Yacus, performance improvement consultant for U.S. Coast Guard

==== Primary results ====
Republican primary results
Party	Candidate	Votes	%
Republican	John Collick	9,004	39.7
Republican	Madison Downs	7,816	34.5
Republican	George Yacus	5,853	25.8
Total votes		22,673	100.0

=== General election ===
==== Predictions ====
Source	Ranking	As of
The Cook Political Report	Safe D	July 2, 2020
Inside Elections	Safe D	June 2, 2020
Sabato's Crystal Ball	Safe D	July 2, 2020
Politico	Safe D	April 19, 2020
Daily Kos	Safe D	June 3, 2020
RCP	Safe D	June 9, 2020
Niskanen	Safe D	June 7, 2020

==== Results ====
Virginia's 3rd congressional district, 2020
Party	Candidate	Votes	%
Democratic	Bobby Scott (incumbent)	233,326	68.4
Republican	John Collick	107,299	31.4
Write-in		736	0.2
Total votes		341,361	100.0
Democratic hold			

== District 4 ==
2020 Virginia's 4th congressional district election
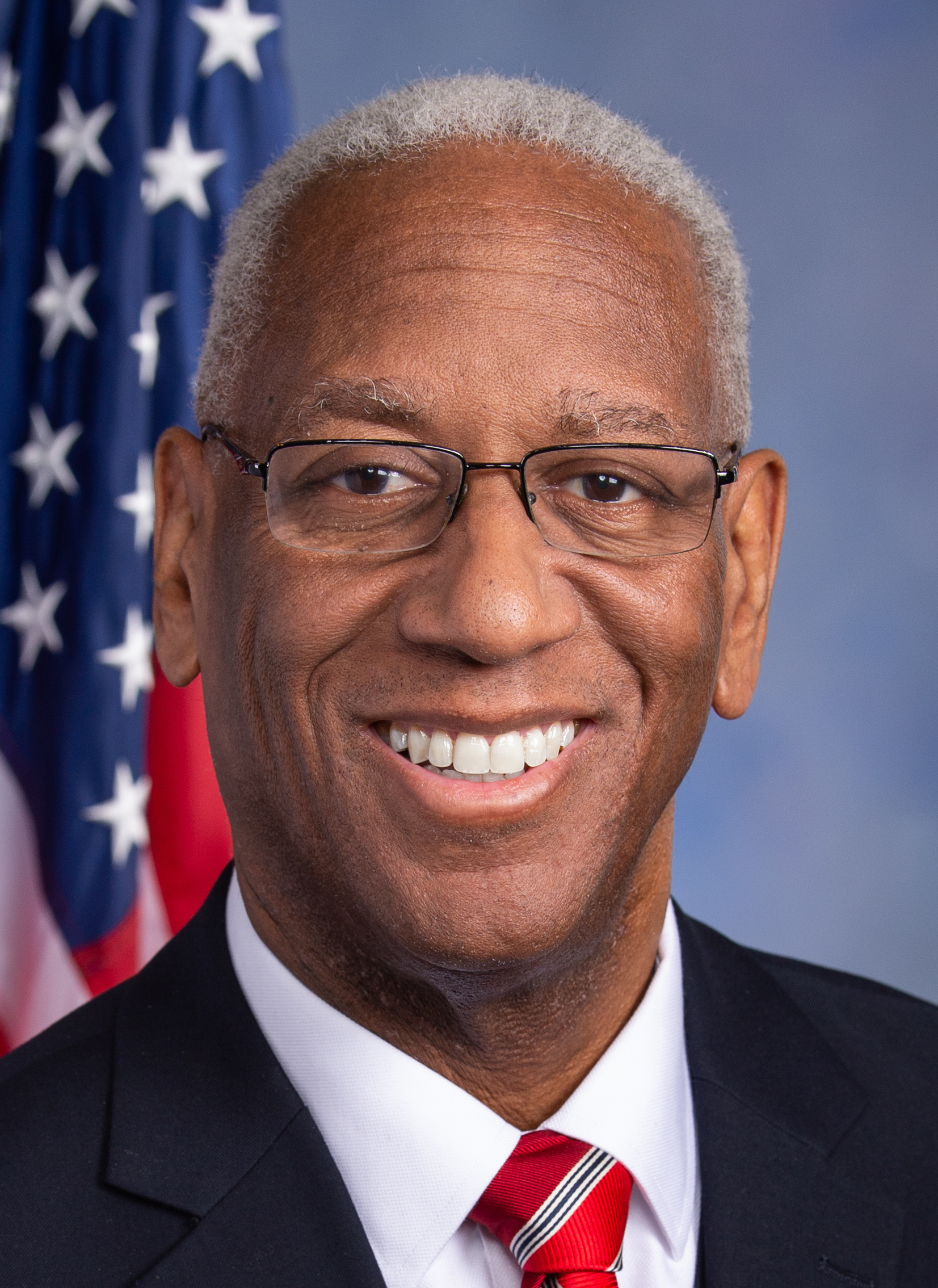

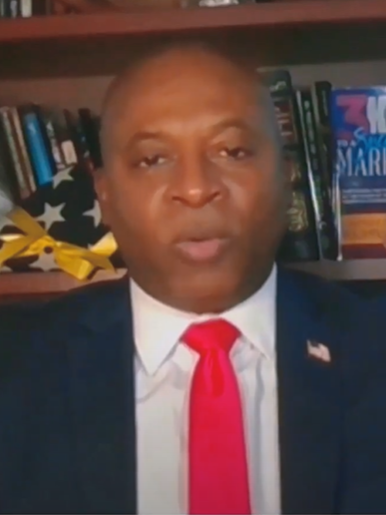
Nominee	Donald McEachin	Leon Benjamin
Party	Democratic	Republican
Popular vote	241,142	149,625
Percentage	61.6%	38.2%
- McEachin: 50–60% 60–70% 70–80% 80–90% >90% Benjamin: 50–60% 60–70% 70–80% 80–90% Tie: 50%
U.S. Representative before election
Donald McEachin
Democratic
Elected U.S. Representative
Donald McEachin
Democratic

The 4th district takes in Richmond and minimal portions of Southside Virginia, and stretches down into Chesapeake. The incumbent was Democrat Donald McEachin, who was re-elected with 62.6% of the vote in 2018.

=== Democratic primary ===
==== Candidates ====
===== Nominee =====
- Donald McEachin, incumbent U.S. representative

==== Eliminated in primary ====
- R. Cazel Levine, former federal executive within U.S. Department of Defense

==== Primary results ====
Democratic primary results
Party	Candidate	Votes	%
Democratic	Donald McEachin (incumbent)	45,083	80.0
Democratic	R. Cazel Levine	11,287	20.0
Total votes		56,370	100.0

=== Republican primary ===
==== Candidates ====
===== Nominee =====
- Leon Benjamin, pastor

=== General election ===
==== Predictions ====
Source	Ranking	As of
The Cook Political Report	Safe D	July 2, 2020
Inside Elections	Safe D	June 2, 2020
Sabato's Crystal Ball	Safe D	July 2, 2020
Politico	Safe D	April 19, 2020
Daily Kos	Safe D	June 3, 2020
RCP	Safe D	June 9, 2020
Niskanen	Safe D	June 7, 2020

==== Results ====
Virginia's 4th congressional district, 2020
Party	Candidate	Votes	%
Democratic	Donald McEachin (incumbent)	241,142	61.6
Republican	Leon Benjamin	149,625	38.2
Write-in		578	0.2
Total votes		391,345	100.0
Democratic hold			

== District 5 ==
2020 Virginia's 5th congressional district election
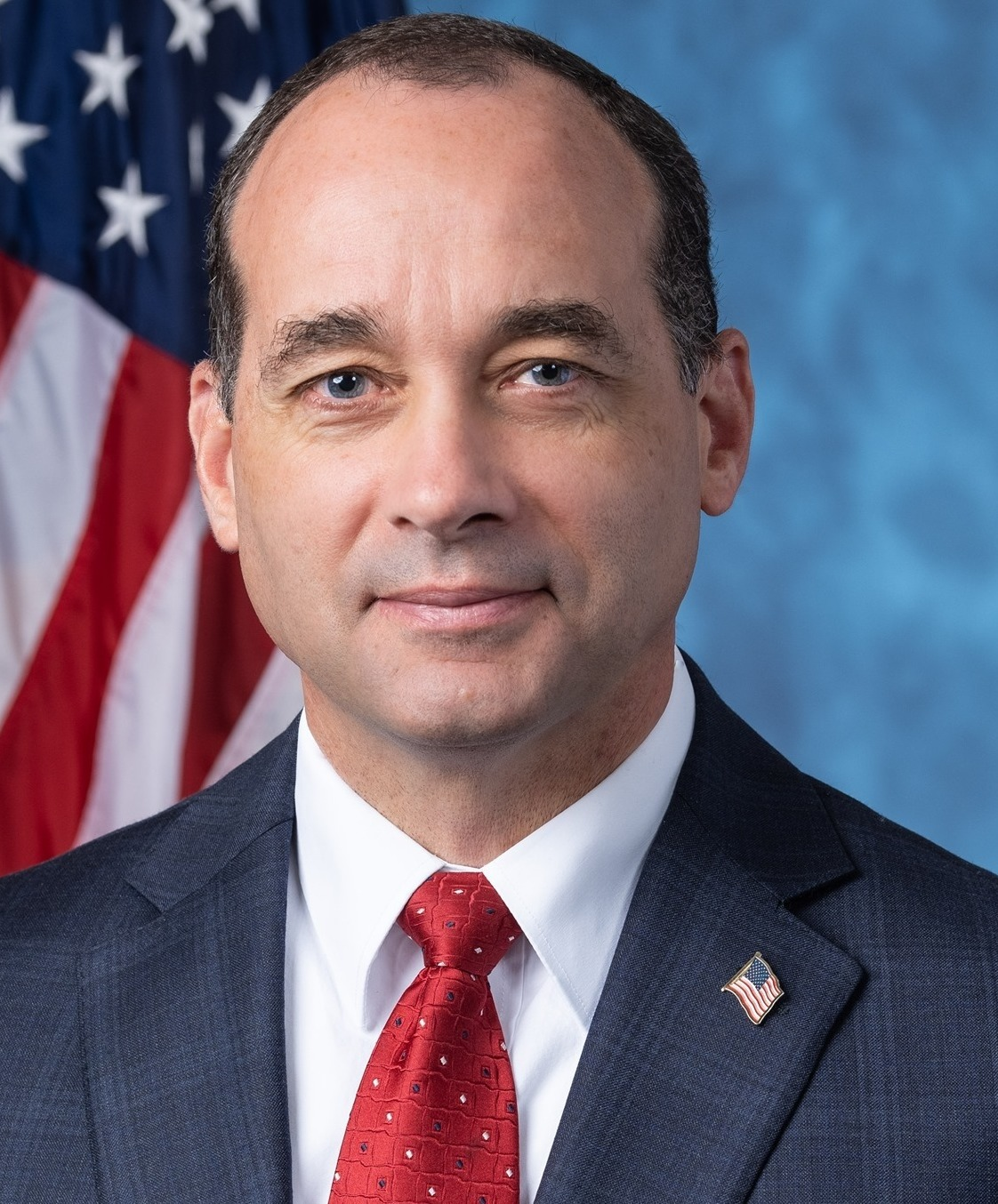

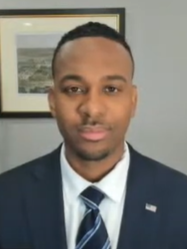
Nominee	Bob Good	Cameron Webb
Party	Republican	Democratic
Popular vote	210,988	190,315
Percentage	52.4%	47.3%
- Good: 40–50% 50–60% 60–70% 70–80% 80–90% Webb: 50–60% 60–70% 70–80% 80–90% >90%
U.S. Representative before election
Denver Riggleman
Republican
Elected U.S. Representative
Bob Good
Republican

The 5th district stretches from Southside Virginia all the way to Northern Virginia, with the city of Charlottesville inside it. The district is larger than six states. The incumbent Republican Denver Riggleman, who was elected with 53.2% of the vote in 2018, was ousted by Bob Good in a district convention.

=== Republican convention ===
==== Candidates ====
===== Nominee =====
- Bob Good, former Campbell County supervisor and former athletics director at Liberty University

==== Eliminated at convention ====
- Denver Riggleman, incumbent U.S. representative

==== Endorsements ====
Denver Riggleman

Executive branch officials

- Donald Trump, president of the United States (2017–2021)

U.S. representatives

- Andy Biggs, AZ-05 (2017–present)
- Jim Jordan, OH-04 (2007–present)

Organizations

- Republican Jewish Coalition

==== Convention results ====
Convention results by county Good: 50–60%; 60–70%; 70–80%; 80–90%; Riggleman: 50–60%; 60–70%; 70–80%

Republican convention results
Party	Candidate	Votes	%
Republican	Bob Good	1,517	58.1
Republican	Denver Riggleman (incumbent)	1,020	41.9
Total votes		2,537	100.0

=== Democratic primary ===
==== Candidates ====
===== Nominee =====
- Cameron Webb, internal medicine physician and former White House Fellow

==== Eliminated in primary ====
- Roger Dean Huffstetler, U.S. Marine Corps veteran, entrepreneur, and candidate for Virginia's 5th congressional district in 2018
- John Lesinski, Rappahannock County supervisor and retired U.S. Marine Corps colonel
- Claire Russo, U.S. Marine Corps veteran

===== Withdrawn =====
- Shadi Ayyas, physician
- Kim Daugherty, attorney (endorsed Webb)

==== Endorsements ====
Roger Dean Huffstetler

State officials

- John Bell, state senator and former state delegate (2016–20)
- Adam Ebbin, state senator and former state delegate (2004–12)
- Louise Lucas, state senator and Senate president pro tempore

Local officials

- Nancy Gill, mayor of Scottsville
- Kay Slaughter, former mayor of Charlottesville (1996–98)
- Bob Wandrei, former mayor of Bedford

Organizations

- LEAP Forward
- National Organization for Women Virginia Chapter
- New Politics
- VoteVets
John Lesinski

Federal officials

- William H. Webster, former director of Central Intelligence (1987–91) and FBI director (1978–87) (Republican)

State officials

- Dave Marsden, state senator and former state delegate (2006–10)

Individuals

- William D. Beydler, retired U.S. Marine Corps lieutenant general
- John R. Bourgeois, retired U.S. Marine Corps colonel and former conductor of the U.S. Marine Band (1979–96)
- Bob Ryan, former American Meteorological Society president (1993)
Claire Russo

Federal officials

- Kirsten Gillibrand, U.S. senator from New York

Organizations

- EMILY's List
- Serve America PAC
- Vote Mama PAC
Cameron Webb

Federal officials

- Kamala Harris, U.S. senator (D-CA)

Local officials

- Pete Buttigieg, former mayor of South Bend, Indiana (2012–2020) and former candidate for 2020 Democratic presidential nomination

Organizations

- 314 Action
- The Collective PAC
- Congressional Black Caucus PAC
- Voter Protection Project

==== Primary results ====
County and independent city results Webb: 40–50%; 50–60%; 60–70%; 70–80%; 80–90%

Democratic primary results
Party	Candidate	Votes	%
Democratic	Cameron Webb	35,965	66.6
Democratic	Claire Russo	9,833	18.2
Democratic	Roger Dean Huffstetler	5,337	9.9
Democratic	John Lesinski	2,902	5.4
Total votes		54,037	100.0

=== General election ===
==== Endorsements ====
Bob Good (R)

Federal officials

- Ted Cruz, U.S. senator from Texas
- Tom Garrett, former U.S. representative (VA-05) (2017-2019)

State senators

- Steve Newman, state senator from Virginia's 23rd Senate district

Individuals

- Jonathan Falwell, senior pastor at Thomas Road Baptist Church, and son of Jerry Falwell Sr.
Cameron Webb (D)

U.S. presidents

- Barack Obama, 44th president of the United States

Federal officials

- Emanuel Cleaver, U.S. representative from Missouri's 5th congressional district
- Jim Clyburn, U.S. representative from South Carolina's 6th congressional district
- Sharice Davids, U.S. representative from Kansas's 3rd congressional district
- Kamala Harris, U.S. senator from California; 2020 vice presidential nominee
- Hakeem Jeffries, U.S. representative from New York's 8th congressional district
- Hank Johnson, U.S. representative from Georgia's 4th congressional district
- John Lewis, U.S. representative from Georgia's 5th congressional district (deceased)
- Jerry McNerney, U.S. representative from California's 9th congressional district
- Kweisi Mfume, U.S. representative from Maryland's 7th congressional district
- Ilhan Omar, U.S. representative from Minnesota's 5th congressional district
- Ayanna Pressley, U.S. representative from Massachusetts's 7th congressional district
- Lisa Blunt Rochester, U.S. representative from Delaware's at-large congressional district
- Abigail Spanberger, U.S. representative from Virginia's 7th congressional district
- Elizabeth Warren, U.S. senator from Massachusetts
- Jennifer Wexton, U.S. representative from Virginia's 10th congressional district

State officials

- Ghazala Hashmi, state senator
- Sally Hudson, state delegate
- Danica Roem, state delegate
- Luke Torian, state delegate

Local officials

- Wes Bellamy, former councilman for the Charlottesville City Council
- Larry Campbell, councilman for the Danville City Council
- Megan Clark, Prince Edward County, Virginia commonwealth attorney
- Kathy Galvin, former councilwoman for the Charlottesville City Council
- John Lesinski, Rappahannock County supervisor, retired U.S. Marine Corps colonel, and 2020 candidate
- Barry Mayo, councilman for the Danville City Council
- Kristin Szakos, former councilwoman for the Charlottesville City Council
- Ryant Washington, former sheriff of Fluvanna County

Labor unions

- United Brotherhood of Carpenters and Joiners of America

Organizations

- Black Economic Alliance
- League of Conservation Voters Action Fund
- Sierra Club

Individuals

- Zyahna Bryant, activist and community organizer
- Leslie Cockburn, journalist, filmmaker, and Democratic nominee for Virginia's 5th congressional district in 2018
- Roger Dean Huffstetler, U.S. Marine Corps veteran, entrepreneur, and candidate for Virginia's 5th congressional district in 2018 and 2020
- Ann Ridgeway, 2019 Democratic nominee for Virginia's 30th House of Delegates district
- Claire Russo, U.S. Marine Corps veteran and 2020 candidate
- Janie Zimmerman, teacher and 2019 Democratic nominee for Virginia's 60th House of Delegates district

==== Predictions ====
Source	Ranking	As of
The Cook Political Report	Tossup	September 17, 2020
Inside Elections	Tossup	October 28, 2020
Sabato's Crystal Ball	Lean R	November 2, 2020
Politico	Lean R	July 6, 2020
Daily Kos	Likely R	June 3, 2020
RCP	Likely R	June 9, 2020
Niskanen	Likely R	June 7, 2020

==== Polling ====
Poll source	Date(s) administered	Sample size	Margin of error	Bob Good (R)	Cameron Webb (D)	Undecided
Public Policy Polling (D) (Note: Poll sponsored by 314 Action, which had endorsed Cameron Webb prior to its sampling period.)	October 21–22, 2020	910 (V)	–	43%	46%	11%
Global Strategy Group (D)	October 4–8, 2020	400 (LV)	± 4.9%	45%	47%	–
Global Strategy Group (D) (Note: Poll conducted for Webb's campaign.)	September 27 – October 1, 2020	500 (LV)	± 4.4%	42%	45%	–
Global Strategy Group (D)	September 10–14, 2020	400 (LV)	± 4.9%	47%	46%	–
Global Strategy Group (D)	July 30 – August 4, 2020	500 (LV)	± 4.4%	48%	42%	–
Public Policy Polling (D)	June 24–25, 2020	1,163 (RV)	± 2.9%	43%	41%	16%

Hypothetical polling

Poll source	Date(s) administered	Sample size	Margin of error	Generic Republican	Generic Democrat
Global Strategy Group (D)	October 4–8, 2020	400 (LV)	± 4.9%	48%	43%

==== Results ====
Virginia's 5th congressional district, 2020
Party	Candidate	Votes	%
Republican	Bob Good	210,988	52.4
Democratic	Cameron Webb	190,315	47.3
Write-in		1,014	0.3
Total votes		402,317	100.0
Republican hold			

== District 6 ==
2020 Virginia's 6th congressional district election
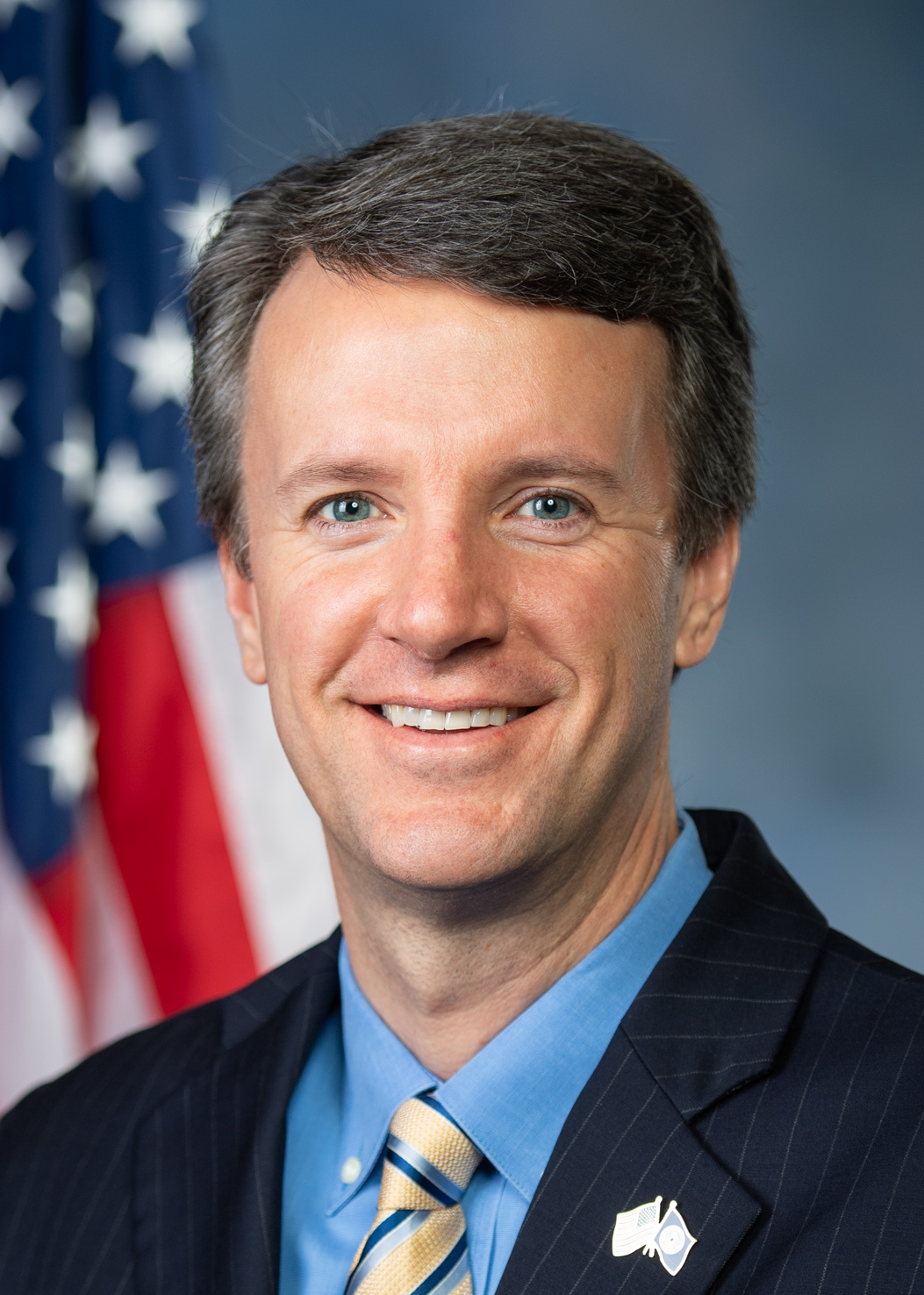

Nominee	Ben Cline	Nick Betts
Party	Republican	Democratic
Popular vote	246,606	134,729
Percentage	64.6%	35.3%
- Cline: 50–60% 60–70% 70–80% 80–90% Betts: 50–60% 60–70% 70–80% 80–90% >90%
U.S. Representative before election
Ben Cline
Republican
Elected U.S. Representative
Ben Cline
Republican

The 6th district is located in west-central Virginia taking in the Shenandoah Valley, including Lynchburg and Roanoke. The incumbent was Republican Ben Cline, who was elected with 59.7% of the vote in 2018.

=== Republican primary ===
==== Candidates ====
===== Nominee =====
- Ben Cline, incumbent U.S. representative

=== Democratic primary ===
==== Nominee ====
- Nick Betts, law clerk

=== General election ===
==== Endorsements ====
Nick Betts (D)

State senators

- Creigh Deeds, state senator from Virginia's 25th Senate district

State representatives

- Sam Rasoul, member of the Virginia House of Delegates from the 11th district

Individuals

- Jennifer Lewis, nominee for the seat in 2018

==== Predictions ====
Source	Ranking	As of
The Cook Political Report	Safe R	July 2, 2020
Inside Elections	Safe R	June 2, 2020
Sabato's Crystal Ball	Safe R	July 2, 2020
Politico	Safe R	April 19, 2020
Daily Kos	Safe R	June 3, 2020
RCP	Safe R	June 9, 2020
Niskanen	Safe R	June 7, 2020

==== Results ====
Virginia's 6th congressional district, 2020
Party	Candidate	Votes	%
Republican	Ben Cline (incumbent)	246,606	64.6
Democratic	Nick Betts	134,729	35.3
Write-in		478	0.1
Total votes		381,813	100.0
Republican hold			

== District 7 ==
2020 Virginia's 7th congressional district election
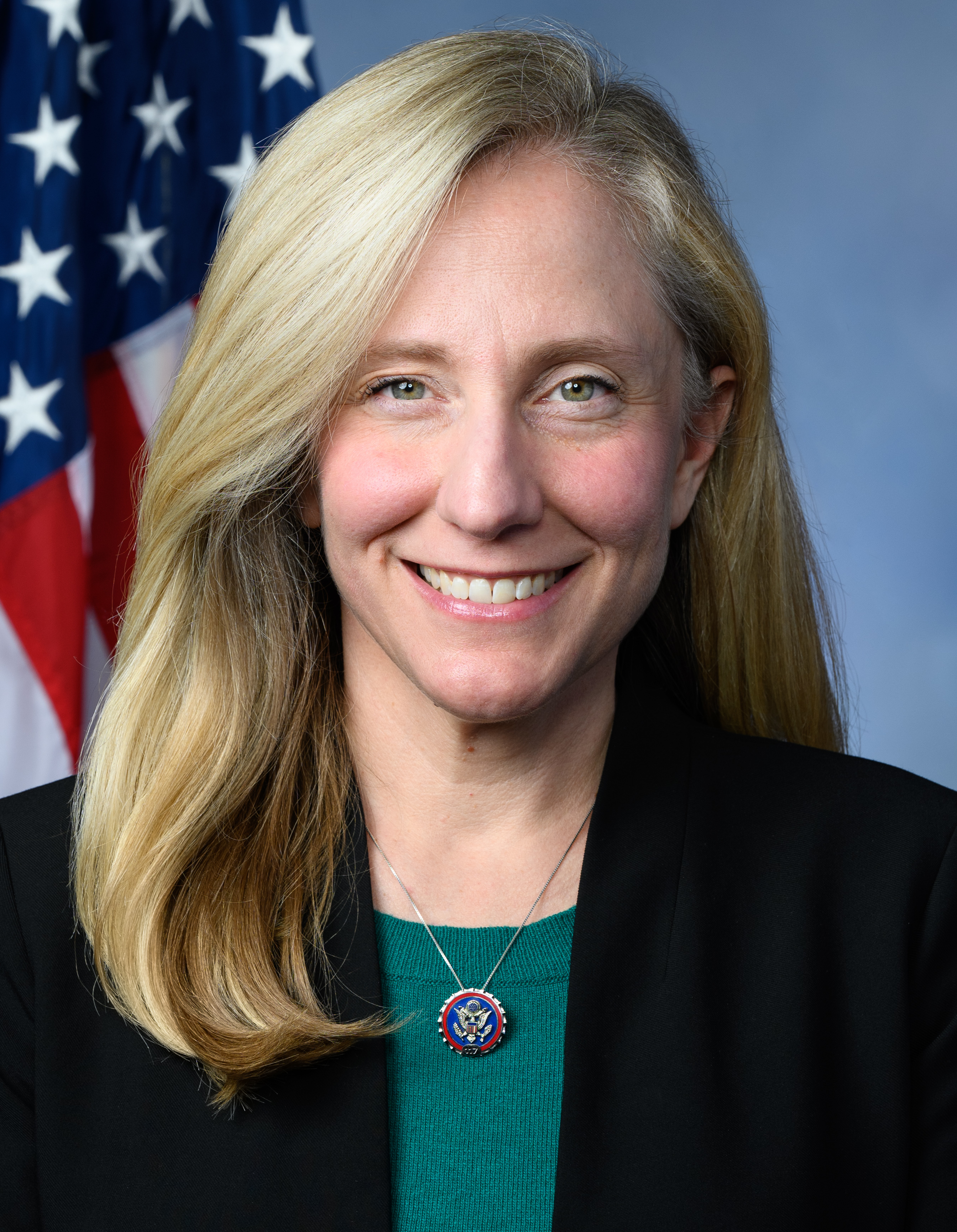

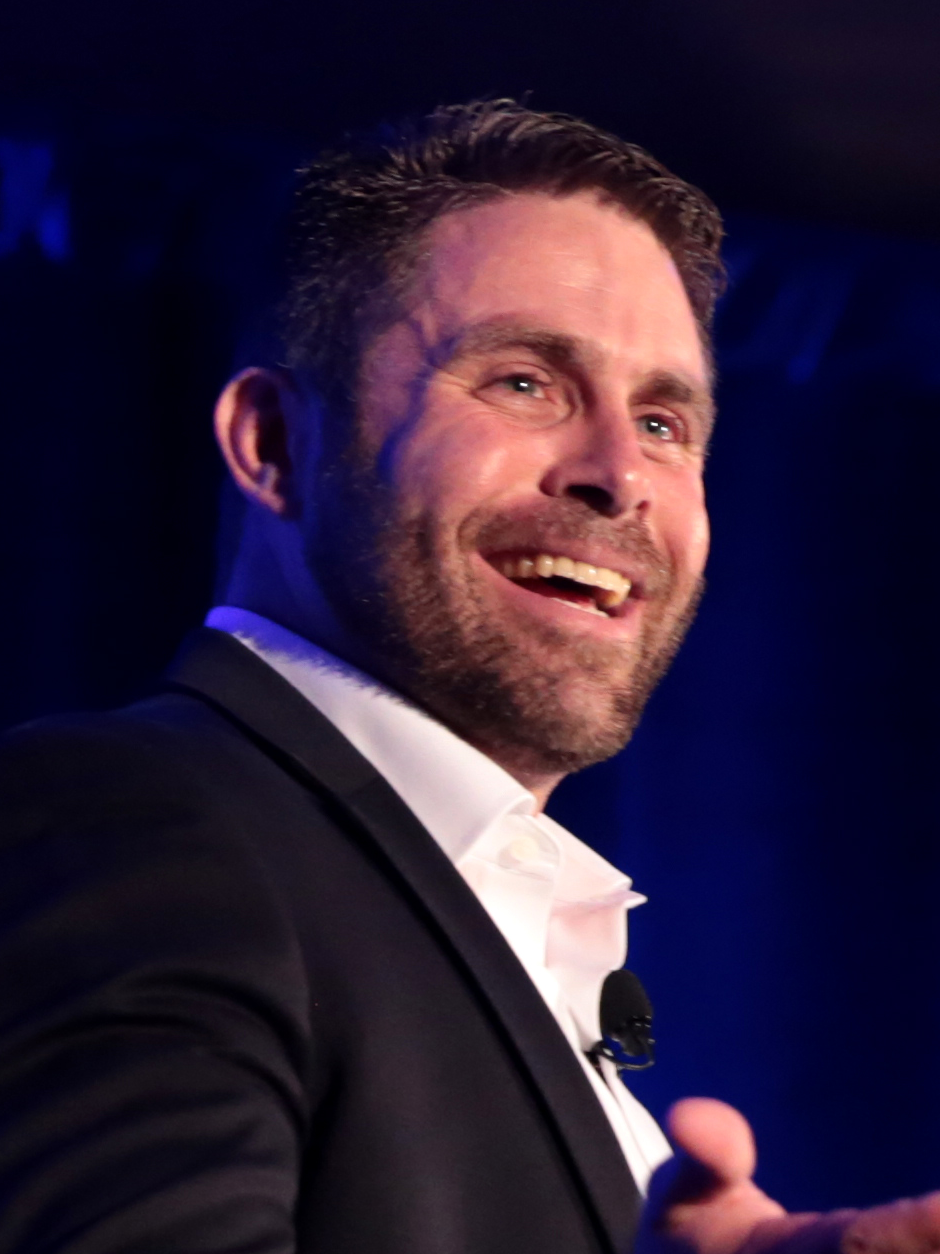
Nominee	Abigail Spanberger	Nick Freitas
Party	Democratic	Republican
Popular vote	230,893	222,623
Percentage	50.8%	49.0%
- Spanberger: 50–60% 60–70% 70–80% 80–90% >90% Freitas: 40–50% 50–60% 60–70% 70–80%
U.S. Representative before election
Abigail Spanberger
Democratic
Elected U.S. Representative
Abigail Spanberger
Democratic

The 7th district is based in central Virginia and encompasses suburban Richmond. The incumbent was Democrat Abigail Spanberger, who flipped the district and was elected with 50.3% of the vote in 2018.

=== Democratic primary ===
==== Candidates ====
===== Nominee =====
- Abigail Spanberger, incumbent U.S. representative

==== Endorsements ====
Abigail Spanberger

U.S. presidents

- Barack Obama, 44th president of the United States

Federal officials

- Kamala Harris, U.S. senator from California; 2020 vice presidential nominee
- Amy Klobuchar, U.S. senator from Minnesota

Organizations

- EMILY's List
- End Citizens United
- J Street PAC
- League of Conservation Voters Action Fund
- NARAL Pro-Choice America
- New Democrat Coalition
- Planned Parenthood Action Fund
- Sierra Club

=== Republican convention ===
==== Candidates ====
===== Nominee =====
- Nick Freitas, state delegate and candidate for U.S. Senate in 2018

===== Eliminated at convention =====
- Peter Greenwald, U.S. Navy veteran and candidate for Virginia's 7th congressional district in 2014
- Andrew Knaggs, former Deputy Assistant Secretary of Defense for Special Operations and Combating Terrorism (2017–2019)
- John McGuire, state delegate
- Tina Ramirez, nonprofit executive, congressional foreign policy adviser, and founder of the congressional International Religious Freedom Caucus
- Jason Roberge, attorney

===== Failed to qualify for convention =====
- Mike Dickinson, businessman
- Craig Ennis, construction worker

===== Declined =====
- Bryce Reeves, state senator

==== Polling ====
Poll source	Date(s) administered	Sample size	Margin of error	Nick Freitas	Peter Greenwald	John McGuire	Tina Ramirez	Bryce Reeves	Undecided
WPA Intelligence (R) (Note: Poll sponsored by Club for Growth Action)	May 13–15, 2019	400 (LV)	± 4.9%	23%	1%	9%	4%	11%	52%

==== Endorsements ====
Nick Freitas

U.S. presidents

- Donald Trump, 45th president of the United States

Federal officials

- Dave Brat, former U.S. representative (VA-07) (2014-2019)
- Ted Cruz, U.S. senator from Texas
- Rand Paul, U.S. senator (KY)

Governors

- Bob McDonnell, former governor of Virginia (2010-2014)

State officials

- Amanda Batten, state delegate
- Scott Lingamfelter, former state delegate (2002-2018)
- Brenda Pogge, former state delegate (2008-2020)

Individuals

- Jerry Falwell Jr., Liberty University president
- John Fredericks, host of the John Fredericks Show
- Pete Snyder, businessman and 2013 Republican candidate for lieutenant governor of Virginia

Organizations

- Club for Growth Action
- Concerned Veterans for America
- FreedomWorks
- House Freedom Fund
- Madison Project
- Tea Party Express
Andrew Knaggs

Organizations

- Black America's (BAM) PAC
John McGuire

Federal officials

- Thomas J. Bliley Jr., former U.S. representative (R-VA-03, VA-07) (1981-2001)

State officials

- Siobhan Dunnavant, state senator
- John O'Bannon, former state delegate (2001-2018)
Tina Ramirez

Organizations

- Maggie's List

=== General election ===
==== Predictions ====
Source	Ranking	As of
The Cook Political Report	Lean D	October 8, 2020
Inside Elections	Tilt D	June 2, 2020
Sabato's Crystal Ball	Lean D	July 2, 2020
Politico	Tossup	April 19, 2020
Daily Kos	Tossup	June 3, 2020
RCP	Tossup	June 9, 2020
Niskanen	Likely D	June 7, 2020

==== Polling ====
Poll source	Date(s) administered	Sample size	Margin of error	Abigail Spanberger (D)	Nick Freitas (R)	Other	Undecided
0ptimus	October 31 – November 2, 2020	514 (LV)	± 4.6%	52%	41%	1% (Note: "Refused" and "Third party candidate" with 1%)	6%

==== Results ====
Virginia's 7th congressional district, 2020
Party	Candidate	Votes	%
Democratic	Abigail Spanberger (incumbent)	230,893	50.8
Republican	Nick Freitas	222,623	49.0
Write-in		823	0.2
Total votes		454,339	100.0
Democratic hold			

== District 8 ==
2020 Virginia's 8th congressional district election
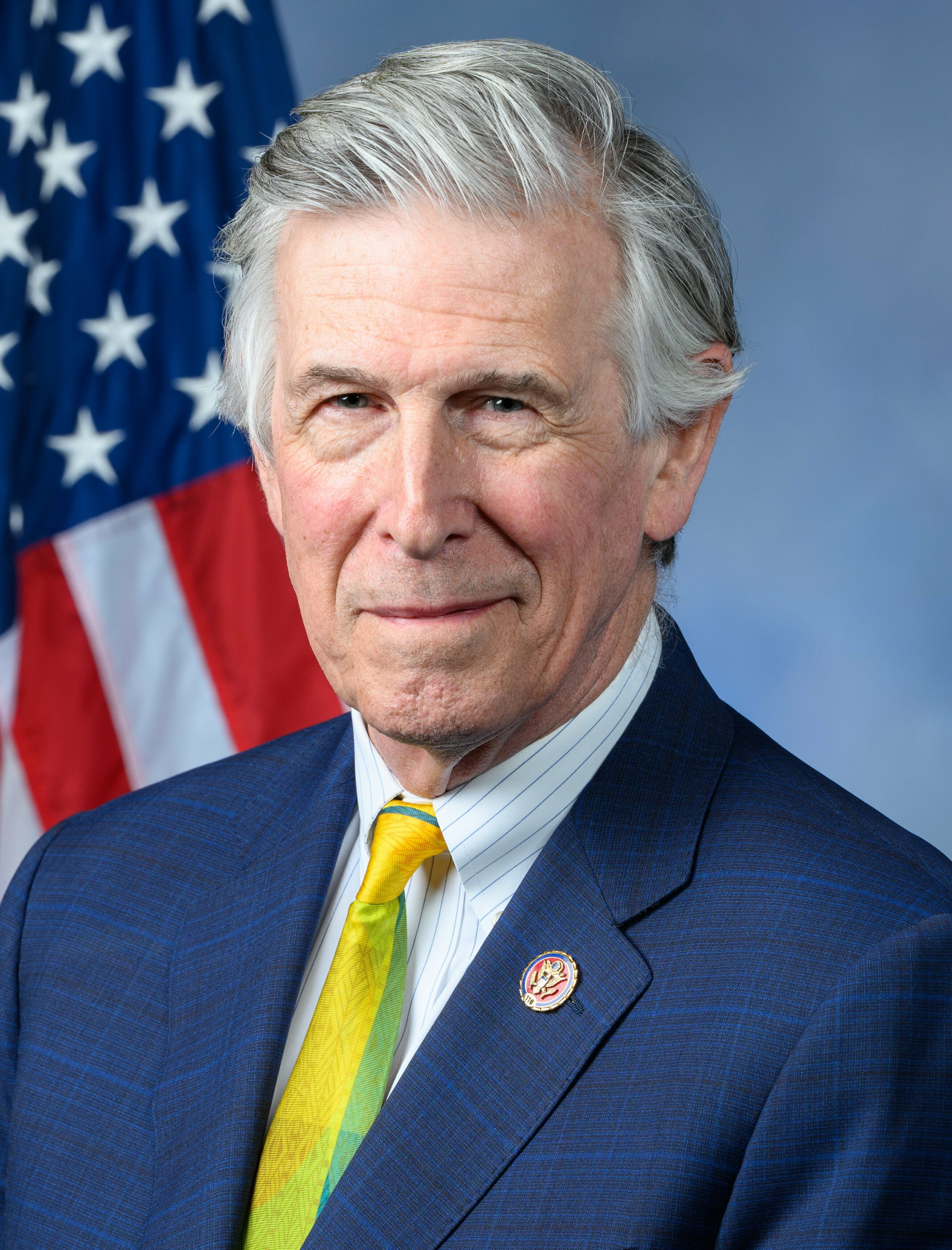

Nominee	Don Beyer	Jeff Jordan
Party	Democratic	Republican
Popular vote	301,454	95,365
Percentage	75.8%	24.0%
- Beyer: 50–60% 60–70% 70–80% 80–90% >90% Jordan: 50–60% No data
U.S. Representative before election
Don Beyer
Democratic
Elected U.S. Representative
Don Beyer
Democratic

The 8th district is based in northern Virginia and encompasses the inner Washington, D.C., suburbs, including Arlington, Alexandria, and Falls Church. The incumbent was Democrat Don Beyer, who was re-elected with 76.1% of the vote in 2018.

=== Democratic primary ===
==== Candidates ====
===== Nominee =====
- Don Beyer, incumbent U.S. representative

==== Endorsements ====
Don Beyer (D)

Local officials

- Pete Buttigieg, former mayor of South Bend, Indiana (2012–2020) and former candidate for 2020 Democratic presidential nomination

Organizations

- Sierra Club

=== Republican convention ===
==== Candidates ====
===== Nominee =====
- Jeff Jordan, defense contractor

===== Eliminated at convention =====
- Mark Ellmore, banker

=== General election ===
==== Predictions ====
Source	Ranking	As of
The Cook Political Report	Safe D	July 2, 2020
Inside Elections	Safe D	June 2, 2020
Sabato's Crystal Ball	Safe D	July 2, 2020
Politico	Safe D	April 19, 2020
Daily Kos	Safe D	June 3, 2020
RCP	Safe D	June 9, 2020
Niskanen	Safe D	June 7, 2020

==== Results ====
Virginia's 8th congressional district, 2020
Party	Candidate	Votes	%
Democratic	Don Beyer (incumbent)	301,454	75.8
Republican	Jeff Jordan	95,365	24.0
Write-in		926	0.2
Total votes		397,745	100.0
Democratic hold			

== District 9 ==
2020 Virginia's 9th congressional district election
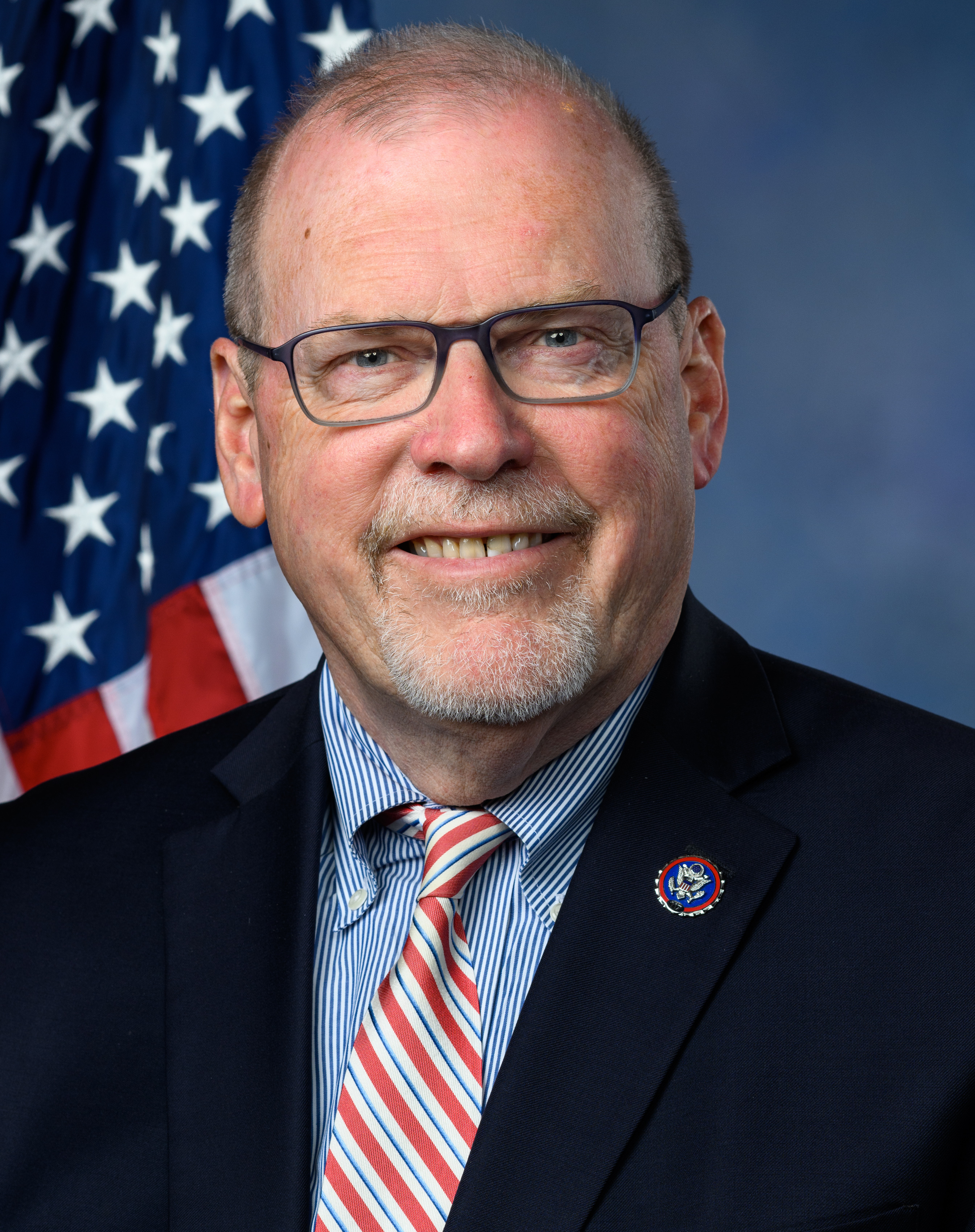
Nominee	Morgan Griffith
Party	Republican
Popular vote	271,851
Percentage	94.0%
- Precinct results Griffith: 60–70% 70–80% 80–90% >90%
U.S. Representative before election
Morgan Griffith
Republican
Elected U.S. Representative
Morgan Griffith
Republican

The 9th district takes in rural southwest Virginia, including Abingdon, Blacksburg, and Salem. The incumbent was Republican Morgan Griffith, who was re-elected with 65.2% of the vote in 2018.

=== Republican primary ===
==== Candidates ====
===== Nominee =====
- Morgan Griffith, incumbent U.S. representative

=== Democratic primary ===
==== Candidates ====
===== Withdrawn =====
- Cameron Dickerson, CIA contractor (accepted Libertarian nomination instead)

=== Libertarian party ===
==== Failed to qualify ====
- Cameron Dickerson, CIA contractor

=== General election ===
==== Predictions ====
Source	Ranking	As of
The Cook Political Report	Safe R	July 2, 2020
Inside Elections	Safe R	June 2, 2020
Sabato's Crystal Ball	Safe R	July 2, 2020
Politico	Safe R	April 19, 2020
Daily Kos	Safe R	June 3, 2020
RCP	Safe R	June 9, 2020
Niskanen	Safe R	June 7, 2020

==== Results ====
Virginia's 9th congressional district, 2020
Party	Candidate	Votes	%
Republican	Morgan Griffith (incumbent)	271,851	94.0
Write-in		17,423	6.0
Total votes		289,274	100.0
Republican hold			

== District 10 ==
2020 Virginia's 10th congressional district election
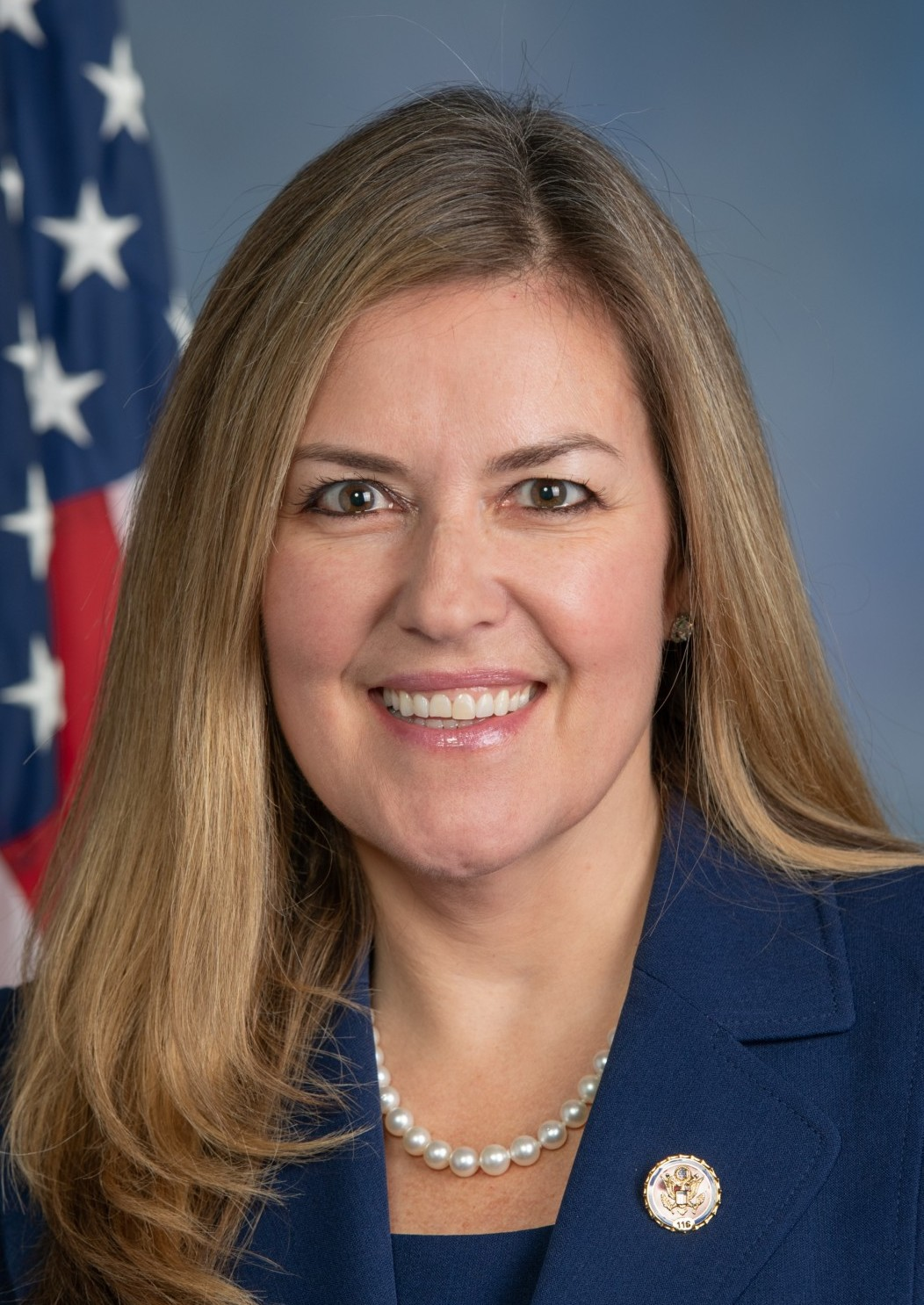

Nominee	Jennifer Wexton	Aliscia Andrews
Party	Democratic	Republican
Popular vote	268,734	206,253
Percentage	56.5%	43.4%
- Wexton: 40–50% 50–60% 60–70% 70–80% 80–90% Andrews: 50–60% 60–70% 70–80% 80–90% >90% No data
U.S. Representative before election
Jennifer Wexton
Democratic
Elected U.S. Representative
Jennifer Wexton
Democratic

The 10th district is based in northern Virginia and the D.C. metro area, encompassing Loudoun and parts of Fairfax, Prince William, Clarke, and Frederick counties. The incumbent was Democrat Jennifer Wexton, who flipped the district and was elected with 56.1% of the vote in 2018.

=== Democratic primary ===
==== Candidates ====
===== Nominee =====
- Jennifer Wexton, incumbent U.S. representative

==== Endorsements ====
Jennifer Wexton

Organizations

- EMILY's List
- League of Conservation Voters Action Fund
- NARAL Pro-Choice America
- Planned Parenthood Action Fund
- Sierra Club

=== Republican convention ===
==== Candidates ====
===== Nominee =====
- Aliscia Andrews, U.S. Marine Corps veteran

==== Eliminated at convention ====
- Jeff Dove, U.S. Army veteran and nominee for Virginia's 11th congressional district in 2018
- Matt Truong, businessman and tech executive

==== Endorsements ====
Aliscia Andrews

Organizations

- Maggie's List
- New York Young Republican Club

=== General election ===
==== Predictions ====
Source	Ranking	As of
The Cook Political Report	Safe D	July 17, 2020
Inside Elections	Safe D	June 2, 2020
Sabato's Crystal Ball	Safe D	July 2, 2020
Politico	Likely D	April 19, 2020
Daily Kos	Safe D	June 3, 2020
RCP	Safe D	June 9, 2020
Niskanen	Safe D	June 7, 2020

2020 Virginia 10th congressional U.S. Representative debates and forums
No.	Date	Host	Moderator	Link	Participants	
P Participant A Absent N Non-invitee I Invitee W Withdrawn						
P Participant A Absent N Non-invitee I Invitee W Withdrawn					Jennifer Wexton	Aliscia Andrews
1	October 8, 2020	Arc of NoVA	Lucy Beadnell	YouTube	P	P
2	October 20, 2020	Loudoun Chamber	Tony Howard	Facebook	P	P

==== Polling ====
Poll source	Date(s) administered	Sample size	Margin of error	Jennifer Wexton (D)	Aliscia Andrews (R)	Undecided
Garin-Hart-Yang Research (D) (Note: Poll sponsored by Wexton's campaign)	October 10–12, 2020	400 (LV)	± 5%	58%	36%	–

==== Results ====
Virginia's 10th congressional district, 2020
Party	Candidate	Votes	%
Democratic	Jennifer Wexton (incumbent)	268,734	56.5
Republican	Aliscia Andrews	206,253	43.4
Write-in		559	0.1
Total votes		475,546	100.0
Democratic hold			

== District 11 ==
2020 Virginia's 11th congressional district election
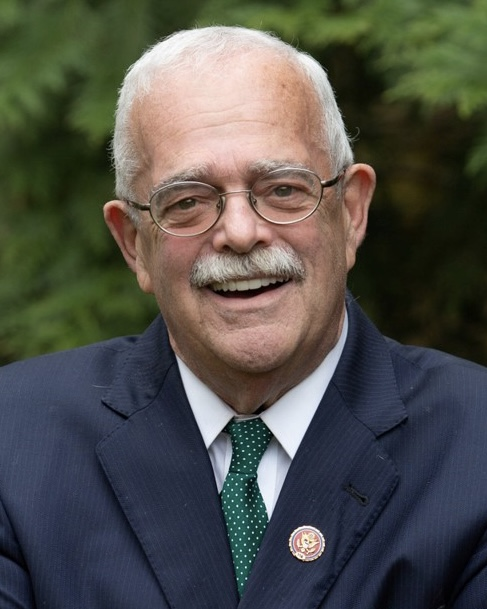

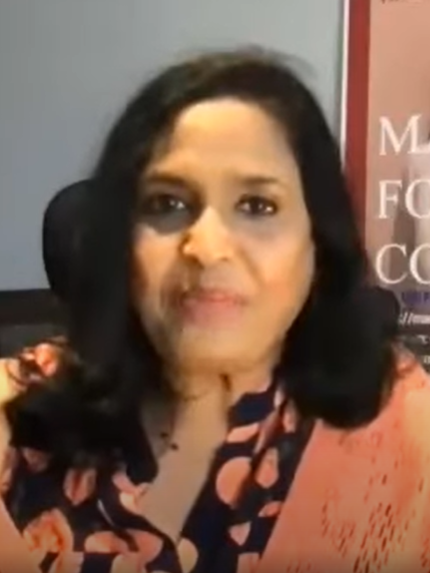
Nominee	Gerry Connolly	Manga Anantatmula
Party	Democratic	Republican
Popular vote	280,725	111,380
Percentage	71.4%	28.3%
- Connolly: 50–60% 60–70% 70–80% 80–90% >90% Anantatmula: 40–50% No data
U.S. Representative before election
Gerry Connolly
Democratic
Elected U.S. Representative
Gerry Connolly
Democratic

The 11th district encompasses the southern and western suburbs of Washington, D.C., including Dale City, Fairfax, and Reston. The incumbent was Democrat Gerry Connolly, who was re-elected with 71.1% of the vote in 2018.

=== Democratic primary ===
==== Nominee ====
- Gerry Connolly, incumbent U.S. representative

==== Eliminated in primary ====
- Zainab Mohsini, activist

==== Endorsements ====
Gerry Connolly

State officials

- Hala Ayala, state delegate
- Eileen Filler-Corn, state delegate and Speaker of the Virginia House of Delegates
- Jennifer Carroll Foy, state delegate and 2021 candidate for Governor of Virginia
- Elizabeth Guzman, state delegate
- Dan Helmer, state delegate
- Dave Marsden, state senator
- Ibraheem Samirah, state delegate
- Dick Saslaw, state senator and majority leader of Senate of Virginia
- Scott Surovell, state senator
- Kathy Tran, state delegate

Local officials

- Jeff McKay, Fairfax County Board of Supervisors chair
- Dalia Palchik, Fairfax County Board of Supervisors member
- James Walkinshaw, Fairfax County Board of Supervisors member

Organizations

- J Street PAC
- Planned Parenthood Action Fund
- Sierra Club
Zainab Mohsini

Organizations

- Rose Caucus

==== Primary results ====
Democratic primary results
Party	Candidate	Votes	%
Democratic	Gerry Connolly (incumbent)	50,626	77.6
Democratic	Zainab Mohsini	14,610	22.4
Total votes		65,236	100.0

=== Republican primary ===
==== Nominee ====
- Manga Anantatmula, businesswoman

=== Predictions ===
Source	Ranking	As of
The Cook Political Report	Safe D	July 2, 2020
Inside Elections	Safe D	June 2, 2020
Sabato's Crystal Ball	Safe D	July 2, 2020
Politico	Safe D	April 19, 2020
Daily Kos	Safe D	June 3, 2020
RCP	Safe D	June 9, 2020
Niskanen	Safe D	June 7, 2020

==== Results ====
Virginia's 11th congressional district, 2020
Party	Candidate	Votes	%
Democratic	Gerry Connolly (incumbent)	280,725	71.4
Republican	Manga Anantatmula	111,380	28.3
Write-in		1,136	0.3
Total votes		393,241	100.0
Democratic hold			

== Notes ==
Partisan clients
