= 2007 Virginia's 1st congressional district special election =

- December 11, 2007

Virginia's 1st congressional district
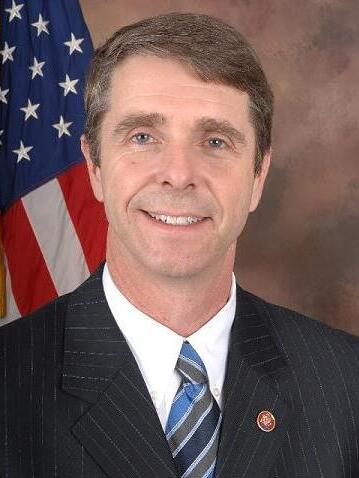

Nominee	Rob Wittman	Philip Forgit
Party	Republican	Democratic
Popular vote	42,772	26,282
Percentage	60.77%	37.34%
- County and independent city results Wittman: 50–60% 60–70% 70–80% 80–90% Forgit: 50–60%
U.S. Representative before election
Jo Ann Davis
Republican
Elected U.S. Representative
Rob Wittman
Republican

After the death of Republican Congresswoman Jo Ann Davis on October 6, 2007, a special election was required to fill the vacancy for the remainder of the 110th United States Congress. Governor Tim Kaine announced that the election would occur on December 11, 2007. The Republican and Democratic candidates were selected by political conventions on November 10, 2007. Republican state delegate Rob Wittman was elected, defeating Democratic nominee Philip Forgit and independent candidate Lucky Narain.

== Candidates ==
=== Democratic ===
Democrats nominated Iraq War veteran and former teacher Philip Forgit over retired United States Navy Captain Ted Hontz by a 106–91 convention vote. The Democratic convention was held in Williamsburg, Virginia. The Democratic Congressional Campaign Committee did not invest large amounts of money into the campaign, opting instead to fund Robin Weirauch's campaign in a special congressional election in Ohio.

=== Republican ===
After five ballots, Republicans chose state delegate Rob Wittman as their nominee when Paul Jost withdrew before the sixth ballot could be announced. The Republican convention was held at Caroline High School in Caroline County, Virginia. The Republican convention drew a wide variety of candidates, including former State Delegate Dick Black; former Republican Party official Jim Bowden; Sherwood Bowditch, the Director of the Virginia Alliance of Boys and Girls Clubs; David Caprara, an activist; retired FBI agent David Corderman; Chuck Davis, the widower of late Congresswoman Davis; businessman Paul Jost, attorney Kevin O'Neill, and businessman Rob Quartel.

=== Independent ===
Lucky Narain, a former Peace Corps volunteer, Army Reservist, and grant writer from Yorktown, filed the necessary petitions to be placed on the ballot as an independent candidate. He criticized Wittman for supporting a transportation tax increase despite having signed an anti-tax pledge; Wittman claimed that he had not signed that particular pledge.

== General election results ==
Virginia's 1st congressional district special election, 2007
Party	Candidate	Votes	%
Republican	Rob Wittman	42,772	60.77
Democratic	Philip Forgit	26,282	37.34
Independent	Lucky R. Narain	1,253	1.78
Write-ins		75	0.11
Total votes		70,382	100.00
Republican hold			

=== By county and independent city ===
Locality	Rob Wittman Republican		Philip Forgit Democratic		All others		Margin		Total votes cast
Locality	#	%	#	%	#	%	#	%	Total votes cast
Caroline (part)	683	73.4%	245	26.3%	3	0.3%	438	47.1%	931
Essex	668	71.8%	256	27.5%	7	0.8%	412	44.3%	931
Fauquier (part)	1,341	67.9%	616	31.2%	17	0.9%	725	36.7%	1,974
Fredericksburg	693	44.6%	845	54.3%	17	1.1%	-152	9.7%	1,555
Gloucester	2,717	61.7%	1,562	35.5%	125	2.8%	1,155	26.2%	4,404
Hampton (part)	970	44.1%	1,171	53.3%	57	2.6%	-201	-9.2%	2,198
James City	5,454	50.4%	5,181	47.9%	181	1.7%	273	2.5%	10,816
King and Queen	386	58.3%	272	41.1%	4	0.6%	114	17.2%	662
King George	1,359	70.5%	544	28.2%	24	1.3%	815	42.3%	1,927
King William	759	64.8%	397	33.9%	15	1.3%	362	30.9%	1,171
Lancaster	1,916	74.5%	644	25.0%	12	0.4%	1,272	49.5%	2,572
Mathews	1,041	60.9%	648	37.9%	20	1.2%	393	23.0%	1,709
Middlesex	1,184	66.8%	566	31.9%	922	1.3%	618	34.9%	1,772
Newport News (part)	3,811	56.4%	2,772	41.0%	180	2.7%	1,039	15.4%	6,763
Northumberland	1,837	75.8%	571	23.5%	17	0.7%	1,266	52.3%	2,425
Poquoson	1,231	67.4%	541	29.6%	55	3.0%	690	37.8%	1,827
Prince William (part)	584	55.0%	457	43.1%	20	1.9%	127	11.9%	1,061
Richmond County	879	85.0%	149	14.4%	6	0.6%	730	70.6%	1,034
Spotsylvania (part)	3,711	66.9%	1,781	32.1%	51	0.9%	1,930	34.8%	5,543
Stafford	4,503	65.9%	2,233	32.7%	92	1.4%	2,270	33.2%	6,828
Westmoreland	1,647	78.5%	439	20.9%	13	0.6%	1,208	67.6%	2,099
Williamsburg	626	36.0%	1,079	62.0%	35	2.1%	-453	-26.0%	1,740
York	4,772	56.5%	3,313	39.3%	355	4.2%	1,459	17.2%	8,440
Totals	42,772	60.8%	26,282	37.3%	1,328	1.9%	16,490	23.5%	70,382

== See also ==
- List of special elections to the United States House of Representatives
