= Rob Wittman =

American politician (born 1959)

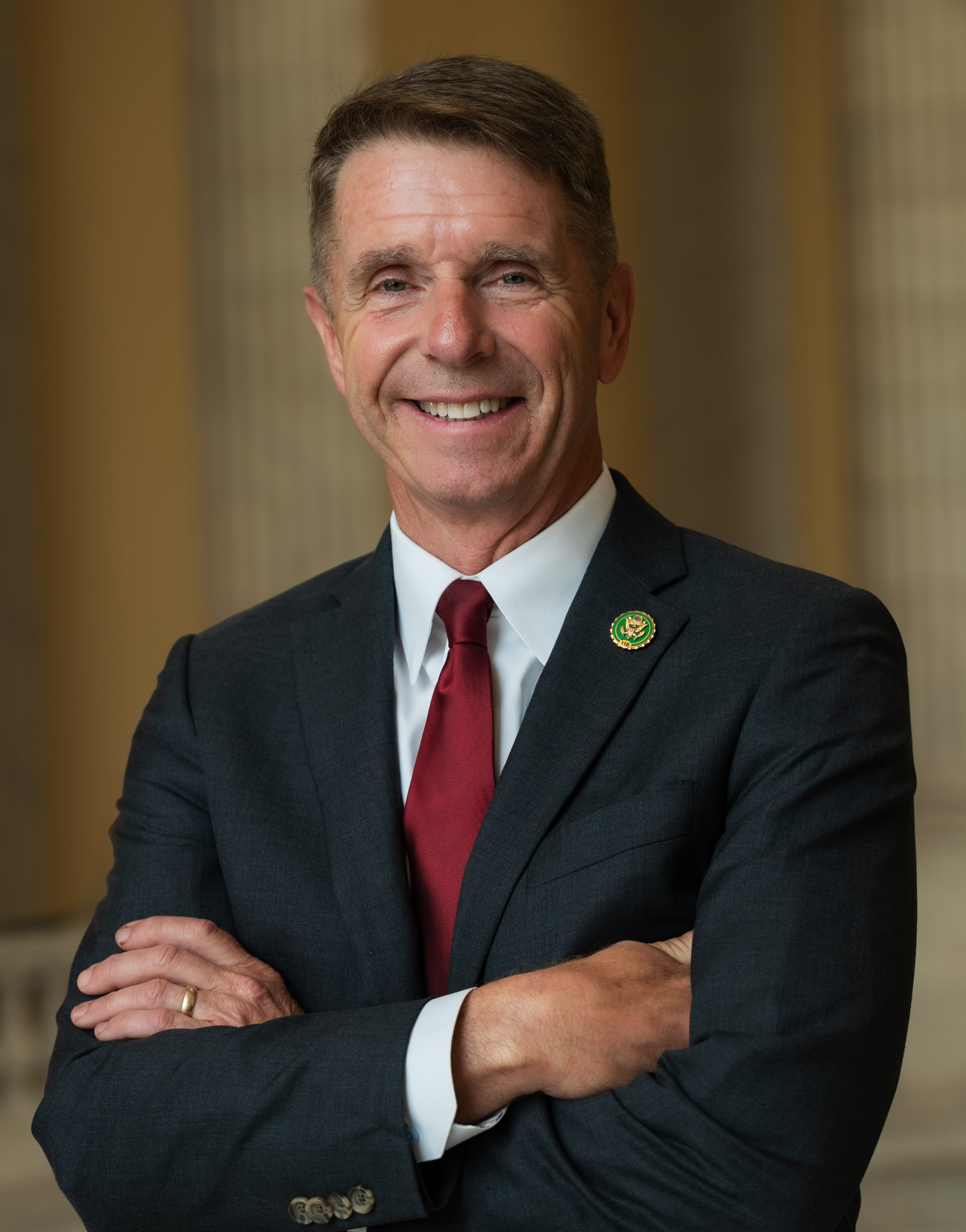
- Official portrait, 2023

Member of the U.S. House of Representatives from Virginia's 1st district
- Incumbent
- Assumed office December 11, 2007 (Note: Wittman's official service begins on the date of the special election, while he was not sworn in until December 13, 2007.)
- Preceded by: Jo Ann Davis

Member of the Virginia House of Delegates from the 99th district
- In office January 13, 2006 – December 11, 2007
- Preceded by: Albert C. Pollard
- Succeeded by: Albert C. Pollard

Personal details
- Born: Robert Joseph Wittman; February 3, 1959 (age 67) Washington, D.C., U.S.
- Party: Republican
- Children: 2
- Education: Virginia Tech (BS); University of North Carolina at Chapel Hill (MPH); Virginia Commonwealth University (PhD)
- Website: House website Campaign website
- Wittman's voice Wittman on the FY2024 National Defense Authorization Act. Recorded July 12, 2023

Robert Joseph Wittman (born February 3, 1959) is an American politician and environmental health specialist serving as the U.S. representative for Virginia's 1st congressional district since 2007. A member of the Republican Party, he previously served as a member of the Virginia House of Delegates from 2006 to 2007. His district contains portions of the Richmond suburbs and Hampton Roads area, as well as the Northern Neck and Middle Peninsula.

In 2026, Wittman was defeated by Shannon Taylor, ending his 20-year tenure in the United States House of Representatives.

== Early life, education, and career ==
Wittman was born in Washington, D.C., the son of adoptive parents Genia C. (née Wlodowkowski) and Frank Joseph Wittman. His father was of German descent and his mother's parents were immigrants from Poland. He grew up in Henrico County, Virginia. He attended the Virginia Polytechnic Institute and State University (Virginia Tech) as a member of the Corps of Cadets and Army ROTC and studied biology. While at Virginia Tech, he spent the summers working at a tomato cannery and on a fishing vessel. Also while in college, Wittman was a member of the Delta Tau Delta fraternity. He earned a master's degree in public health from the University of North Carolina at Chapel Hill in 1990 and a Ph.D. from Virginia Commonwealth University in 2002. Wittman worked for 20 years with the Virginia Department of Health. He served as an environmental health specialist and was field director for the Division of Shellfish Sanitation.

Wittman served on the Montross Town Council from 1986 to 1996 and as mayor of the Town of Montross from 1992 to 1996. Two of his major initiatives in this office were the overhaul of the sewage system and the development of a computerized system for tax billing. From 1996 to 2005, Wittman served on the Westmoreland County Board of Supervisors, the last two years as chair. He helped create new libraries and pushed for raises in teacher salaries.

== Virginia House of Delegates ==
In 2005, Wittman was elected to the Virginia House of Delegates, representing the 99th district. He served on the Agricultural; Chesapeake and Natural Resources; and Police and Public Safety Committees.

== U.S. House of Representatives ==
=== Committee assignments ===
- Committee on Armed Services (Vice Chair)
  - Subcommittee on Tactical Air and Land Forces (Chair)
  - Subcommittee on Seapower and Projection Forces
- Committee on Natural Resources
  - Subcommittee on Fisheries, Wildlife, Oceans and Insular Affairs

=== Caucus memberships ===
- House Baltic Caucus
- Congressional Constitution Caucus
- United States Congressional International Conservation Caucus
- Congressional Shipbuilding Caucus
- Congressional Public Health Caucus
- Republican Study Committee
- Congressional Blockchain Caucus
- Congressional Wildlife Refuge Caucus
- Rare Disease Caucus
- Congressional Caucus on Turkey and Turkish Americans
- Congressional Western Caucus

== Political positions ==
Wittman co-sponsored a personhood bill in Congress that defined life as beginning at conception.

In 2012, Wittman said he would consider cutting pay and benefits for service members who join the military in the future in order to avoid closing bases or cutting the number of military personnel.

Wittman authored the Chesapeake Bay Accountability and Recovery Act, designed "to enhance coordination, flexibility and efficiency of restoration efforts," according to Wittman. After several senators sponsored a bill to reauthorize the North American Wetlands Conservation Act, Wittman introduced a version of the bill for House members to consider. He proposed the Advancing Offshore Wind Production Act (H.R. 1398), which he said was designed to simplify the process companies must go through to test and develop offshore wind power.

=== Health care ===
Wittman opposes the Affordable Care Act and has voted to repeal it. He said that Congress should not merely be "anti-Obamacare" and that congressional Republicans are ready to provide alternatives if it is deemed unconstitutional. In 2017, he voted for the American Health Care Act, which would have repealed and replaced the ACA.

=== Texas v. Pennsylvania ===
In December 2020, Wittman was one of 126 Republican members of the House of Representatives to sign an amicus brief in support of Texas v. Pennsylvania, a lawsuit filed at the United States Supreme Court contesting the results of the 2020 presidential election, in which Joe Biden defeated incumbent Donald Trump. The Supreme Court declined to hear the case on the basis that Texas lacked standing under Article III of the Constitution to challenge the results of an election held by another state.

=== Certification of 2020 presidential election ===
On January 6, 2021, Wittman was one of the 147 Republican members of the U.S. Congress who objected to certifying the 2020 presidential election. He voted against certifying Pennsylvania's electors after a day of violence as the U.S. Capitol was breached by Trump supporters who disrupted proceedings, despite no evidence of widespread voter fraud.

== Political campaigns ==
=== 2005 ===
Wittman was first elected to the Virginia House of Delegates over Democrat Linda M. Crandell with 62% of the vote.

=== 2007 ===
Wittman was reelected to the Virginia House of Delegates unopposed.

On December 11, 2007, Wittman was first elected to the United States Congress to succeed the late congresswoman Jo Ann Davis, who died in October 2007. He was heavily favored in the special election due to the 1st's heavy Republican bent; it has been in Republican hands since 1977. The Independent candidate was Lucky Narain.

=== 2008 ===
Wittman was elected to his first full term, defeating Democratic nominee Bill Day and Libertarian Nathan Larson.

=== 2010 ===
Wittman was reelected, defeating Democratic nominee Krystal Ball and Independent Green candidate Gail Parker.

=== 2012 ===
Wittman was reelected, defeating Democratic nominee Adam Cook and Independent Green candidate Gail Parker.

=== 2014 ===
Wittman defeated Democratic nominee Norm Mosher, Libertarian Xavian Draper, and Independent Green Gail Parker.

=== 2016 ===
Wittman defeated Democratic nominee Matt Rowe and Independent Green candidate Gail Parker.

=== 2018 ===
Wittman defeated Democratic nominee Vangie Williams. With the Republicans losing their remaining seat based in the Washington suburbs, as well as seats in Hampton Roads and the Richmond suburbs, Wittman was left as the only Republican holding a seat east of Charlottesville.

=== 2020 ===
Wittman defeated Democratic nominee Qasim Rashid.

=== 2022 ===
Wittman defeated Democratic nominee Herb Jones and Independent David Foster.

=== 2024 ===
Wittman defeated Democratic nominee Leslie Mehta 56% to 44%.

=== 2026 ===
Wittman was defeated by Democratic Henrico County Commonwealth Attorney Shannon Taylor 51% to 48%.

== Personal life ==
Wittman is an Episcopalian and a member of St. James Episcopal Church in Montross. He is married and has two children.

== Electoral history ==
Virginia's 1st congressional district: Results 2007–2024
Year	Republican	Votes	Pct	Democrat	Votes	Pct	3rd Party	Party	Votes	Pct	Source
2007	Rob Wittman	42,772	61%	Philip Forgit	26,282	37%	Lucky Narain	Independent	1,253	2%	
2008	Rob Wittman	203,839	57%	Bill Day	150,432	42%	Nathan Larson	Libertarian	5,265	1%	
2010	Rob Wittman	135,564	64%	Krystal Ball	73,824	35%	Gail Parker	Independent Green	2,544	1%	
2012	Rob Wittman	200,845	56%	Adam M. Cook	147,036	41%	Gail Parker	Independent Green	8,308	2%	
2014	Rob Wittman	131,861	62.9%	Norm Mosher	72,059	34.4%	Gail Parker	Independent Green	5,097	2.4%	
2016	Rob Wittman	230,213	59.8%	Matt Rowe	140,785	36.6%	Gail Parker	Independent Green	12,866	3.3%	
2018	Rob Wittman	183,250	55.2%	Vangie A. Williams	148,464	44.7%					
2020	Rob Wittman	260,614	58.2%	Qasim Rashid	186,923	41.7%					
2022	Rob Wittman	191,828	56.0%	Herb Jones	147,229	43.0%	David Foster	Independent	3,388	1.0%	
2024	Rob Wittman	269,657	56.31%	Leslie C. Mehta	208,445	43.53%	Write-in		804	0.17%	

U.S. House of Representatives
Preceded by Jo Ann Davis	Member of the U.S. House of Representatives from Virginia's 1st congressional district 2007–present	Incumbent
U.S. order of precedence (ceremonial)
Preceded by Bob Latta	United States representatives by seniority 63rd	Succeeded by André Carson
