= Cameron Webb =

American politician (born 1983)

B. Cameron Webb
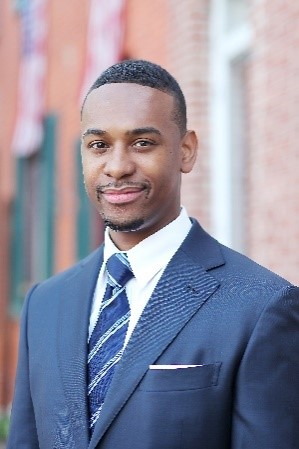
- Webb in 2016

Virginia State Health Commissioner
- Incumbent
- Assumed office Jan 17, 2026
- Governor: Abigail Spanberger
- Preceded by: Karen Shelton, MD

Personal details
- Born: Bryant Cameron Webb; June 21, 1983 (age 43) Fairfax, Virginia, U.S.
- Party: Democratic
- Children: 2
- Education: University of Virginia (BA); Loyola University Chicago (JD); Wake Forest University (MD)

Bryant Cameron Webb (born June 21, 1983) is an American physician, attorney, and politician from Virginia, currently serving as the Commissioner of the Virginia Department of Health since January 2026. Webb was the Democratic Party nominee for Virginia's 5th congressional district in the 2020 election. He served as the White House Senior Policy Advisor for COVID-19 Equity in the Biden administration.

== Early life and education ==
Webb is a native of Spotsylvania, Virginia. He earned a Bachelor of Arts in interdisciplinary studies from the University of Virginia, a Doctor of Medicine from the Wake Forest School of Medicine, and a Juris Doctor from Loyola University Chicago School of Law.

== Career ==
Webb was a White House Fellow in 2016 and 2017. He works at the University of Virginia Health System as an Assistant Professor of Medicine and Public Health Science.

Webb was a Democratic Party candidate for the United States House of Representatives for Virginia's 5th congressional district in the 2020 elections. In the Democratic primary on June 23, Webb defeated three candidates to win the nomination. He was defeated by Republican nominee Bob Good in the November general election. On January 16, 2021, it was announced that Webb would serve as a COVID-19 Senior Policy Advisor in the incoming Biden Administration.

In 2026, Webb was nominated by Governor Abigail Spanberger to serve as the Commissioner of the Virginia Department of Health.

== Personal life ==
Webb is married and has two children.

== Electoral history ==
Virginia's 5th congressional district election, 2020
Party	Candidate	Votes	%
Republican	Bob Good	210,988	52.4
Democratic	Cameron Webb	190,315	47.3
Write-in		1,014	0.3
Total votes		402,317	100.0
Republican hold			
