= Bob Good =

American politician (born 1965)

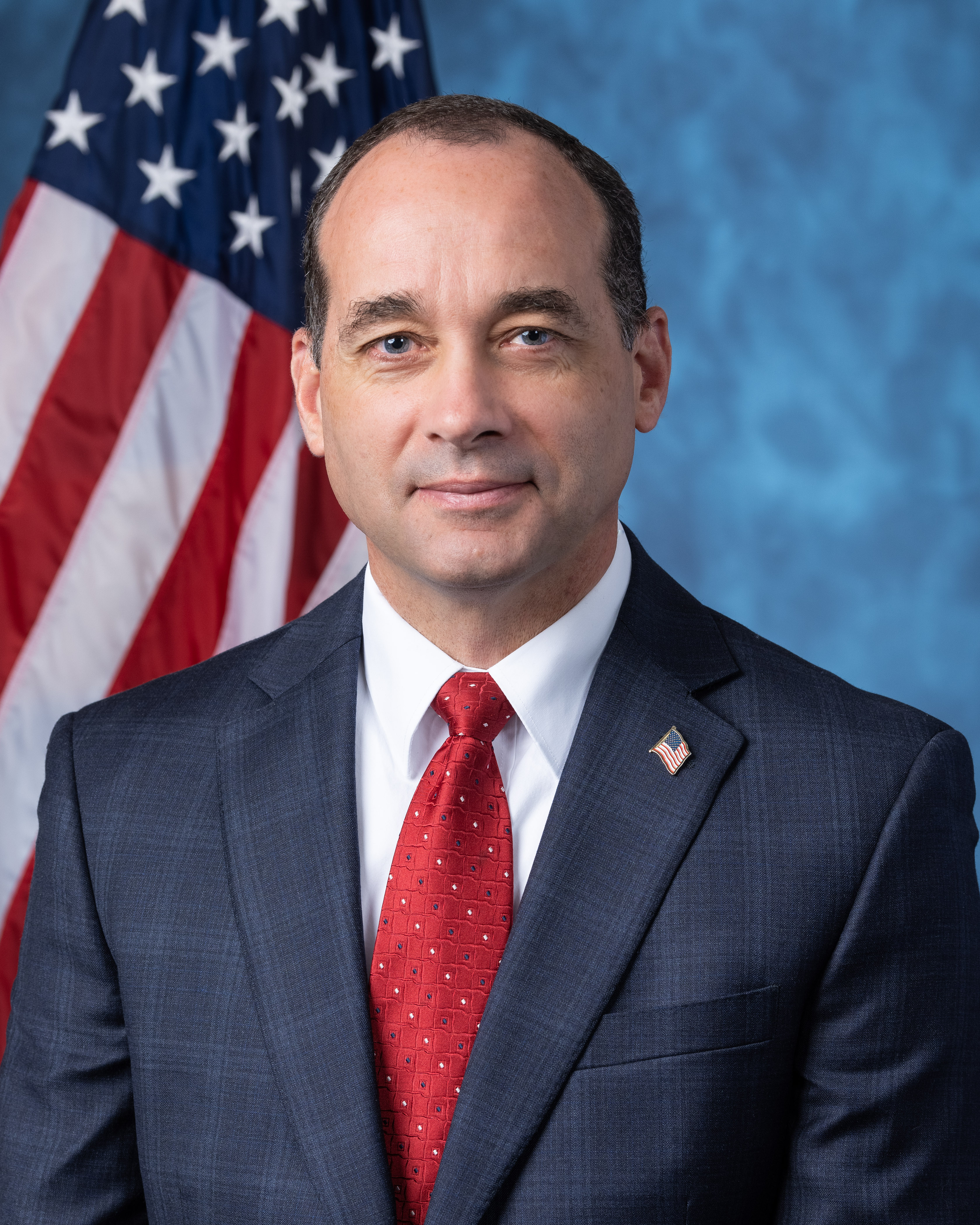
- Official portrait, 2020

Chair of the House Freedom Caucus
- In office January 1, 2024 – September 17, 2024
- Preceded by: Scott Perry
- Succeeded by: Andy Harris

Member of the U.S. House of Representatives from Virginia's 5th district
- In office January 3, 2021 – January 3, 2025
- Preceded by: Denver Riggleman
- Succeeded by: John McGuire

Member of the Campbell County Board of Supervisors from the Sunburst district
- In office January 1, 2016 – December 31, 2019
- Preceded by: Steven Shockley
- Succeeded by: Steven Shockley

Personal details
- Born: Robert George Good; September 11, 1965 (age 60) Wilkes-Barre, Pennsylvania, U.S.
- Party: Republican
- Spouse: Tracey Good (m. 1988)
- Children: 3
- Education: Liberty University (BS, MBA)
- Good's voice Good on the 1967 USS Forrestal fire. Recorded October 21, 2021

Robert George Good (born September 11, 1965) is an American politician and former athletic director who served as the U.S. representative for Virginia's 5th congressional district from 2021 to 2025. A member of the Republican Party, he previously served as a member of the Board of Supervisors in Campbell County, Virginia from 2016 to 2019. Good also worked at his alma mater, Liberty University, and for Citi.

Good was first elected to Congress in 2020, after defeating incumbent Denver Riggleman in the Republican convention. Good supported the removal of Kevin McCarthy as Speaker of the House and became chair of the House Freedom Caucus in January 2024. He also endorsed Ron DeSantis instead of Donald Trump in the 2024 Republican Party presidential primaries. As a result, Good faced a primary challenge from state senator John McGuire, who was recruited by Kevin McCarthy and endorsed by Donald Trump. McGuire's victory was certified on July 2, by a margin of 0.6%. Good requested a recount, which he lost. He resigned as chair of the Freedom Caucus on September 17, 2024, and was succeeded by Andy Harris.

== Early life and education ==
Good was born in Wilkes-Barre, Pennsylvania, and lived in North Jersey before moving to Lynchburg, Virginia, with his family at age nine. He attended Liberty Christian Academy, where he was a member of the wrestling team. Good was awarded a partial wrestling scholarship to Liberty University, where he earned a Bachelor of Science in finance and a Master of Business Administration.

== Career ==
For 17 years, Good worked for Citi Financial. When he announced his campaign for Congress in 2019, he was serving as an associate athletic director for development at Liberty University.

Good was a member of the Campbell County Board of Supervisors from 2016 to 2019. During his three years as a county supervisor, he supported socially conservative causes, voting to condemn the U.S. Supreme Court decision recognizing a constitutional right to same-sex marriage; to declare the county a "Second Amendment sanctuary"; and to call upon the Virginia General Assembly to restrict transgender restroom use.

== U.S. House of Representatives ==
=== Elections ===
==== 2020 ====
Good ran against incumbent Denver Riggleman in the Republican nominating convention for Virginia's 5th congressional district in the United States House of Representatives. He defeated Riggleman with 58% of the vote from party delegates during a drive-through nominating convention instead of a primary election. During the campaign, Good criticized Riggleman for officiating at the same-sex wedding of two former campaign volunteers.

Good campaigned on a conservative platform, espousing hard-line views on immigration policy and opposition to same-sex marriage and aligning himself with President Donald Trump. He called for the repeal of the Affordable Care Act and opposed mask mandates during the COVID-19 pandemic. He did not wear a face covering or encourage the wearing of face coverings at campaign events, and opposed restrictions on businesses to slow the spread of the virus. Good suggested that the wearing of face coverings might be harmful. In the November 3 general election, Good defeated Democratic nominee Cameron Webb, a physician, 52.6% (210,988) to 47.4% (190,315).

==== 2022 ====
In 2022, Good defeated Democratic nominee Josh Throneburg with 57.6% of the vote.

==== 2024 ====
Good had initially backed Ron DeSantis, who was a founder of the Freedom Caucus, against Trump in the 2024 Republican Party presidential primaries. He considered DeSantis more of a "true conservative" than Trump on issues like abortion and gun control. Because of this, Trump would endorse Good's primary opponent, John McGuire on May 28, 2024. Good later switched his endorsement to Trump after DeSantis backed out of the primary. Good continued to use campaign signage featuring Trump's name and image, resulting in Trump sending a cease-and-desist letter to Good. McGuire was also backed by former House Speaker Kevin McCarthy, who Good voted to remove from the speakership. Representative Warren Davidson, a fellow member of the Freedom Caucus, took an unprecedented step in backing McGuire against Good, who chaired the Caucus.

Good lost the primary election to McGuire in June 2024. Good did not concede and promised a recount of the votes. He lost by slightly over 0.5% of the vote, which would require his campaign to foot the costs of a recount. Good cast doubt on the legitimacy of the election, inaccurately claiming that fires broke out at polling places and alleging a lack of security for election drop boxes in Lynchburg, where Good sought to block certification of election results. Other Republican members of Congress have ridiculed Good's complaints, while McGuire has called on him to accept the results of the election. A recount completed on August 1 confirmed that Good lost to McGuire by 370 votes, after which Good conceded the election.

Good insinuated that his primary election loss was marred by fraud, drawing ridicule from fellow Republican members of Congress. Good sought to block the certification of election results in Lynchburg, the biggest city in the district.

=== Tenure ===
After his election, Good appeared amid the pandemic at a rally in Washington, D.C., in which Trump supporters protested the Supreme Court's rejection of a lawsuit attempting to subvert the results of the election, which Trump lost to Joe Biden. During the rally, Good promoted the theory that Democrats had perpetrated a vast conspiracy to steal the election. He said that while the virus was real, the pandemic was "phony". Good told a maskless crowd that "this is a phony pandemic" and, the next day, suggested that precautions to prevent the spread of the disease were a "hoax".

On January 6, 2021, Good voted against certifying the election of President-elect Biden. On January 17, he voted against a House bill awarding Congressional Gold Medals to the U.S. Capitol Police and the District of Columbia Metropolitan Police Department for their roles in protecting the Capitol and members of Congress during the storming of the United States Capitol. He and 20 other House Republicans voted against a similar resolution in June 2021.

On June 26, 2021, Good appeared at Bedford County, Virginia's, second annual militia muster, saying he was happy to be at the event with "proud patriots and constitutional conservatives who are doing their part to help strengthen our nation and to fight for the things that we believe in".

In July 2021, Good voted against the bipartisan ALLIES Act, which would have increased the number of special immigrant visas for Afghan allies of the U.S. military by 8,000 during its invasion of Afghanistan while also reducing some application requirements that caused long application backlogs. The bill passed the House 407–16.

On October 26, 2021, while the House discussed anti-domestic violence legislation, Good said: "Nearly everything that plagues our society can be attributed to a failure to follow God's laws for morality and his rules for and definition of marriage and family."

In October 2021, Good encouraged a group of high school students from Rappahannock County, Virginia, to defy a local school mask mandate, saying, "If nobody in Rappahannock complies, they can't stop everyone".

In November 2021, Good wrote Virginia Governor-elect Glenn Youngkin a letter asking Youngkin to halt a federal mask mandate once he took office.

On January 11, 2022, Good urged fellow Republicans to boycott the Capitol Hill Club, a popular dining spot for Republican officials, after it mandated that all guests must show proof of COVID-19 vaccination.

On March 1, 2022, Good said he would not attend President Joe Biden's State of the Union address: "President Biden subjected the country to life-altering mandates for over a year. I will not submit to an unnecessary COVID test to attend a State of the Union only to hear this president whisper through a speech that will inevitably fail to take responsibility for the tremendous damage he has and continues to cause to our country."

In March 2024, Good signed a letter, along with nine other members, to the House Committee on Agriculture opposing the inclusion of the Ending Agriculture Trade Suppression (EATS) Act which aims to restrict states' ability to regulate agricultural products produced in other states.

Good has been a supporter of efforts to impeach President Joe Biden. During the 117th United States Congress, Good was co-sponsor of three resolutions to impeach President Biden. Good also co-sponsored a resolution to impeach Vice President Kamala Harris and another resolution to impeach Secretary of Homeland Security Alejandro Mayorkas. During the 118th Congress, Good cosponsored another resolution to impeach Mayorkas.

As of the 117th Congress, Good voted with President Joe Biden's stated position 2.7% of the time according to a FiveThirtyEight analysis. He supported the removal of Kevin McCarthy as Speaker of the House arguing he failed to deliver on promises to reduce government spending.

Good voted to support Israel following the 2023 Hamas attack on Israel.

==== Immigration ====
Good sponsored H.R. 6202, the American Tech Workforce Act of 2021, introduced by Representative Jim Banks. The legislation would establish a wage floor for the high-skill H-1B visa program, thereby significantly reducing employer dependence on the program. The bill would also eliminate the Optional Practical Training program that allows foreign graduates to stay and work in the United States.

=== Committee assignments ===
- Committee on Education and Labor
- Committee on Budget

=== Caucus memberships ===
- Freedom Caucus
- Republican Study Committee

== Personal life ==
Good and his wife, Tracey, have three children. They live in Evington, southwest of Lynchburg.

Good has described himself as a born-again Christian and a "biblical conservative".

== Electoral history ==
Campbell County's Sunburst supervisorial district election, 2015
Party	Candidate	Votes	%
Republican	Bob Good	801	54.0
Independent	Travis Lee Griffin	680	45.9
Write-in		2	0.1
Total votes		1,483	100.0
Republican gain from Independent			

Virginia's 5th congressional district Republican convention, 2020
Party	Candidate	Votes	%
Republican	Bob Good	1,517	58.1
Republican	Denver Riggleman (incumbent)	1,020	41.9
Total votes		2,537	100.0

Virginia's 5th congressional district election, 2020
Party	Candidate	Votes	%
Republican	Bob Good	210,988	52.4
Democratic	Cameron Webb	190,315	47.3
Write-in		1,014	0.3
Total votes		402,317	100.0
Republican hold			

Virginia's 5th congressional district election, 2022
Party	Candidate	Votes	%
Republican	Bob Good (incumbent)	177,191	57.6
Democratic	Joshua Throneburg	129,996	42.2
Write-in		603	0.2
Total votes		307,790	100.0
Republican hold			

Virginia's 5th Congressional district 2024 Republican primary
Party	Candidate	Votes	%
Republican	John J. McGuire III	31,583	50.3%
Republican	Bob Good (incumbent)	31,209	49.7%
Total votes		62,972	100.0%

U.S. House of Representatives
Preceded by Denver Riggleman	Member of the U.S. House of Representatives from Virginia's 5th congressional district 2021–2025	Succeeded by John McGuire
Party political offices
Preceded by Scott Perry	Chair of the House Freedom Caucus; 2024	Succeeded by Andy Harris
U.S. order of precedence (ceremonial)
Preceded by Elaine Luria as Former U.S. Representative	Order of precedence of the United States as Former U.S. Representative	Succeeded by Joe DioGuardi as Former U.S. Representative
