= Thomas E. Glascock =

US attorney and politician

Thomas Glascock
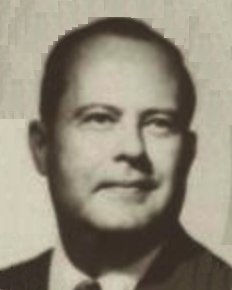
- Official portrait, 1982

Member of the Virginia House of Delegates from the 47th district
- In office January 13, 1982 – January 12, 1983
- Preceded by: Calvin Sanford
- Succeeded by: Shirley Cooper

Personal details
- Born: Thomas Edwin Glascock; December 1, 1932 (age 93) Marshall, Virginia, U.S.
- Party: Democratic
- Education: Hampden–Sydney College; University of Virginia

Thomas Edwin Glascock (born December 1, 1932) is an American attorney and Democratic politician who served in the Virginia House of Delegates from 1982 to 1983. While in the House, he was one of thirty-five delegates who voted for a resolution to bring the Equal Rights Amendment to the floor. In 1985, he ran in the 92nd district but was defeated by Independent candidate Mary T. Christian, who went on to be reelected as a Democrat eight times.
