= Shirley Cooper =

American politician

Member of the Virginia House of Delegates from the 96th district
- In office January 12, 1983 – January 14, 1998
- Preceded by: Thomas E. Glascock
- Succeeded by: Jo Ann Davis

Personal details
- Born: Shirley Dawn Fields; December 8, 1943 (age 82) Southern Pines, North Carolina, U.S.
- Party: Democratic
- Spouse: Ned Waddell Cooper
- Education: Christopher Newport College; Old Dominion University

Shirley Fields Cooper (born December 8, 1943) is a former teacher and Democratic politician. First elected to the Virginia House of Delegates in 1982 after serving on the York County Board of Supervisors, she remained in the chamber for seven full terms before being defeated for reelection by real estate broker Jo Ann Davis in 1997.

== Early and family life ==
Born in Southern Pines, North Carolina, Cooper was educated at Hampton High School and Christopher Newport College in southeastern Virginia. She graduated from Old Dominion University with a B.A. in mathematics from the School of Computer Programming. She married Ned Waddell Cooper and bore two sons.

== Career ==
Cooper worked as a teacher and was active in many civic associations, including the Concerned Citizens for Better Government (serving as president). She also served on the governing boards of the Jamestown-Yorktown Foundation, Williamsburg Chamber of Commerce, Peninsula Chamber of Commerce and the Virginia Peninsula Economic Development Council.

Cooper was active in Democratic Party politics and won election to the York County Board of Supervisors, where she also served two terms as chair). In 1982 Cooper won election to the Virginia House of Delegates in 1982 from a district which included parts of Gloucester and York Counties, as well as King and Queen and King William Counties, defeating Republican Charles H. Duff III, then won re-election seven times. However, in 1997 she narrowly lost to Republican Jo Ann S. Davis, who would win election to the U.S. House of Representatives in 2000.
