= Qasim Rashid =

American activist (born 1982)

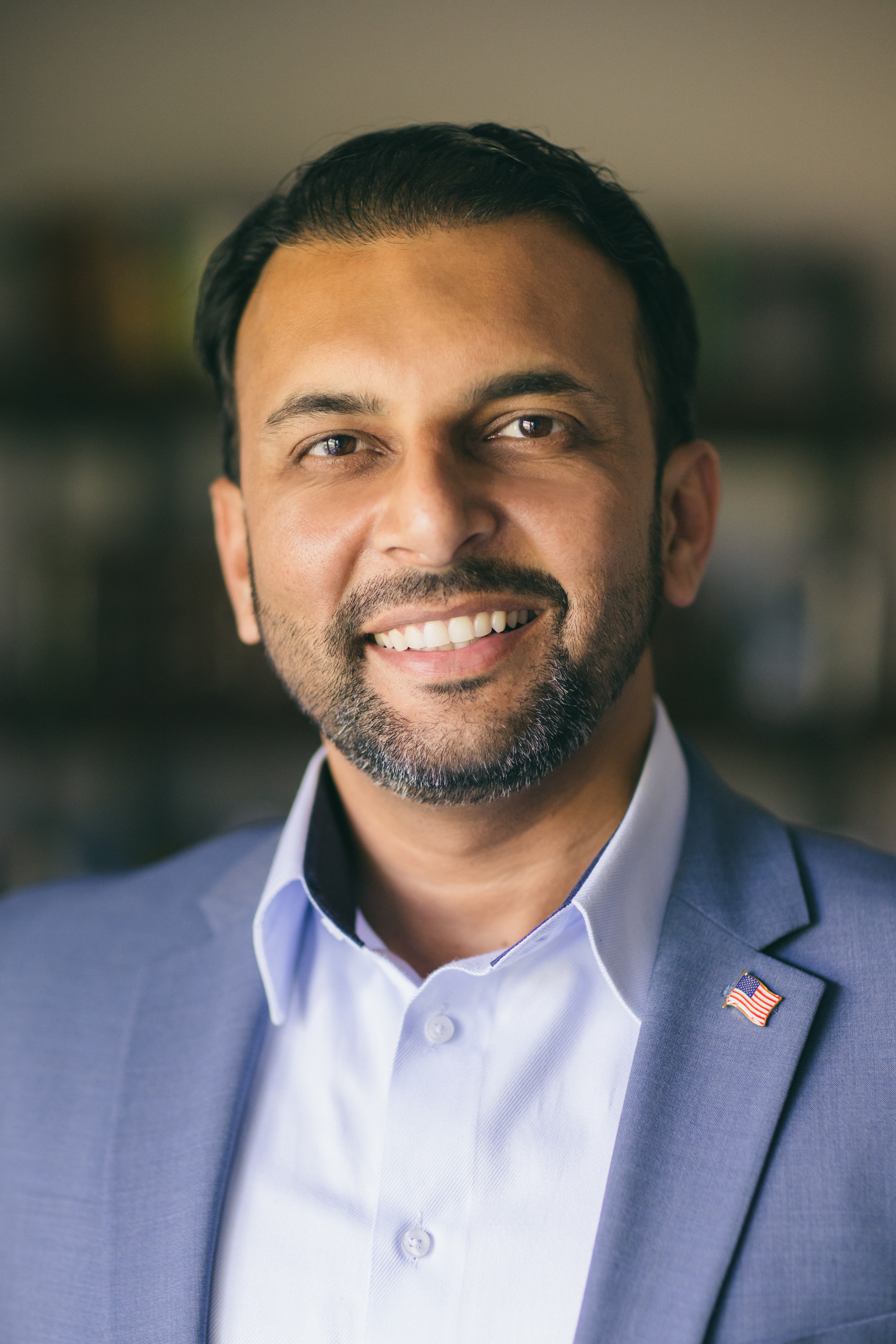

Personal details
- Born: July 21, 1982 (age 44) Rawalpindi, Pakistan
- Party: Democratic
- Education: University of Illinois, Chicago (BA); University of Richmond (JD)

Qasim Rashid (born July 21, 1982) is a Pakistani-born American author, activist, and attorney. He is a member of the Democratic Party. Rashid ran unsuccessfully for the Democratic nomination for Illinois's 11th congressional district in 2024. Previously, Rashid was an unsuccessful candidate for the Virginia State Senate in 2019 and the Democratic nominee for Virginia's 1st congressional district in the 2020 election.

== Early life and education ==
Rashid was born in Rawalpindi, Pakistan, in 1982. His father was an Ahmadi missionary. In 1987, he moved with his family to the United States, where they lived in Washington, D.C. and Chicago, Illinois. He is a graduate of the University of Illinois at Chicago and received his Juris Doctor degree from the University of Richmond School of Law. He served as executive editor of The Richmond Journal of Global Law and Business.

== Career ==
From 2006 to 2009, Rashid served as the Associate Director of Admissions for Kaplan University. In October 2010, Rashid rallied a group of Muslim youth to march on Washington, raising slogans of "Love for all, hatred for none" as a part of the "Muslims for Peace" campaign. In August of that year, The New York Times ran a feature story on Rashid, covering his outreach efforts in the American Midwest.

Rashid has written for numerous outlets including Time, NPR and The Independent. His essay "I believe in love for all, hatred for none" was featured on NPR's This I Believe. As a freelance author, he has written on Donald Trump's so-called "Muslim ban" and other current affairs, such as the 2019 Christchurch shooting and the subsequent debate on gun control.

=== Political career ===
In 2019, Rashid announced his candidacy for the 28th district of the Virginia Senate. He defeated Laura Ann Sellers in the Democratic primary, before losing to incumbent Republican Richard Stuart in the general election.

On January 20, 2020, Rashid announced his candidacy for Virginia's 1st congressional district in the 2020 election. On June 23, 2020, Rashid defeated Vangie Williams in the Democratic primary. He lost to incumbent Republican Rob Wittman in the general election.

On July 5, 2023, Rashid announced his candidacy for Illinois's 11th congressional district in the 2024 election, a primary challenge to seven-term Democratic incumbent Bill Foster. Rashid lost to Foster in the primary on March 19, 2024.

== Works ==
Rashid has authored four books, The Wrong Kind of Muslim; Extremist: A Response to Geert Wilders & Terrorists Everywhere; Talk To Me: Changing the Narrative on Race, Religion, and Education, and Hannah and the Ramadan Gift; and has co-authored and co-edited two books, Towards a Greater Jihad and By the Dawn's Early Light.

=== The Wrong Kind of Muslim ===
Released in June 2013, The Wrong Kind of Muslim was Rashid's first book. It received financial support through crowd-sourcing. It looks at the treatment of Ahmadi Muslims and other minority faiths in Pakistan. Rashid conveys the stories of those who were jailed, injured, and martyred for their faith. He also seeks to explain why they maintain their faith.

=== Extremist: A Response to Geert Wilders & Terrorists Everywhere ===
Released in 2014, this book criticizes both Islamic terrorist and the critics of Islam. It's written to clarify important issues like Islam's view on free speech, women's rights, and Jihad-

=== Talk To Me ===
Talk to Me was published on May 17, 2016. It is a non-fiction memoir from inspiring thought leaders on how the power of dialogue can overcome racism, xenophobia, intolerance, and violence. It highlights the importance of meaningful and moral conversation between people of all faiths, ages, genders, etc., to facilitate understanding and tolerance and promote a more peaceful society.

=== Hannah and the Ramadan Gift ===
Rashid first children's book, Hannah and the Ramadan Gift, was released through Penguin Publishing in 2021. The book details the experiences of Hannah, a girl too young to fast during Ramadan.

== Electoral history ==
Date	Election	Candidate	Party	Votes	%
Virginia State Senate, District 28
June 11, 2019	Primary	Qasim Rashid	Democratic	3,302	59.41
June 11, 2019	Primary	Laura Sellers	Democratic	2,256	40.59
Nov 5, 2019	General	Qasim Rashid	Democratic	29,696	42.44
Nov 5, 2019	General	Richard Stuart	Republican	40,193	57.44
Virginia's 1st congressional district
Jun 23, 2020	Primary	Qasim Rashid	Democratic	21,768	52.8
Jun 23, 2020	Primary	Vangie Williams	Democratic	19,469	47.2
Nov 3, 2020	General	Qasim Rashid	Democratic	186,923	41.8
Nov 3, 2020	General	Rob Wittman	Republican	260,614	58.2
Illinois's 11th congressional district
Mar 19, 2024	Primary	Qasim Rashid	Democratic	10,295	23.2
Mar 19, 2024	Primary	Bill Foster	Democratic	34,166	76.8

== Personal life ==
Rashid is an Ahmadi Muslim, is married, has three children, and lives in Naperville, Illinois. He is the younger brother of Tayyib Rashid, a United States Marine who runs a social media outreach brand as "the Muslim Marine". Tayyib Rashid has also given media interviews and raises awareness about Muslims living in the United States. Rashid grew up with actor Lamorne Morris. Rashid has defended his Ahmadiyya faith against criticism.
