= Melanie Rapp Beale =

Virginia politician (born 1964)

Member of the Virginia House of Delegates from the 96th district
- In office January 10, 2001 – January 9, 2008
- Preceded by: Jo Ann Davis
- Succeeded by: Brenda Pogge

Personal details
- Born: Melanie Lynn Rapp; September 5, 1964 (age 61) Lake Worth, Florida, U.S.
- Party: Republican
- Spouse: Timothy Bryan Beale
- Education: Christopher Newport College; Old Dominion University

Melanie Rapp Beale (born September 5, 1964) is a former Republican member of the Virginia House of Delegates. While serving on the York County Board of Supervisors, Beale won a special election in 2000 to succeed Jo Ann Davis after her election to the United States House of Representatives. She went on to be reelected three times, after which she accepted a job with Dominion Virginia Power.

In 2019, Beale ran again for the House of Delegates in the 96th district. She lost the Republican primary to former legislative staffer Amanda Batten.
