= Virginia's 96th House of Delegates district =

Virginia legislative district

Virginia's 96th State House of Delegates district
- District map from the 2023 election
Delegate
Kelly Fowler; D
- Demographics: 45.4% White; 25.0% Black; 9.7% Hispanic; 14.7% Asian; 3.8% Other
- Population (2020): 85,233
- Registered voters (2024): 59,377

Virginia's 96th House of Delegates district elects one of the 100 members of the Virginia House of Delegates, the lower house of the state's bicameral legislature.

Before redistricting, District 96 included parts of James City County and York County. After the 2020 Census and redistricting, it is located in Virginia Beach and represented by Democrat Kelly Convirs-Fowler.

== List of delegates ==
Delegate	Party	Years	Electoral history
Shirley Cooper	Democratic	January 12, 1983 – January 14, 1998	Lost reelection
Jo Ann Davis	Republican	January 14, 1998 – January 3, 2001	Elected to U.S. House
Melanie Rapp	Republican	January 10, 2001 – January 9, 2008	Did not seek reelection
Brenda Pogge	Republican	January 9, 2008 – January 8, 2020	Did not seek reelection
Amanda Batten	Republican	January 8, 2020 – January 9, 2024	First elected in 2019; re-districted to District 71
Kelly Convirs-Fowler	Democratic	January 10, 2024 – Present	First elected in 2017 in District 21
