= Brenda Pogge =

American politician (born 1957)

Member of the Virginia House of Delegates from the 96th district
- In office January 9, 2008 – January 8, 2020
- Preceded by: Melanie Rapp
- Succeeded by: Amanda Batten

Personal details
- Born: Brenda Elizabeth Lowe; March 18, 1957 (age 69) Norfolk, Virginia, U.S.
- Party: Republican
- Spouse: Roger Franklin Pogge
- Children: 5
- Profession: Real estate agent
- Committees: Agriculture, Chesapeake and Natural Resources; Education; Health, Welfare and Institutions
- Website: www.brendapogge.com

Brenda Lowe Pogge (born March 18, 1957) is an American politician of the Republican Party. From 2008 to 2020 she was a member of the Virginia House of Delegates, representing the 96th district on the Virginia Peninsula, made up of parts of James City and York Counties.
