= Central Rappahannock Regional Library =

Coordinates: 38.27212°N 77.48080°W

- Abbreviation: CRRL
- Formation: 1969
- Purpose: Public Library System
- Director: Rebecca Purdy

Central Rappahannock Regional Library (CRRL) is a public library system that serves the city of Fredericksburg and Spotsylvania, Stafford, and Westmoreland counties in Virginia. The library system is within Region 5 of Virginia Library Association (VLA).

== History ==
Central Rappahannock Regional Library (CRRL) system was established in 1969 as the public library system for the counties of Spotsylvania, Stafford, Westmoreland, Caroline, and the City of Fredericksburg.

In 1907, the city of Fredericksburg received $15,000 to establish a permanent library from Captain C. Wistar Wallace. The library was built in 1909 and opened to the public in 1910. Miss Sally Gravatt served as the first librarian.

In 1969, Central Rappahannock Regional Library system was formed. Lafayette school building was donated to the library system. In 1970, the Wallace Library books collection was merged with 29,000 books purchased by the state of Virginia. Stafford, Spotsylvania, and Westmoreland counties were given service through the two bookmobiles.

Regional Friends of the Library were established in Spotsylvania, Stafford, Westmoreland, Caroline, and the City of Fredericksburg in 1972. Also in the year of 1972, the Colonial Beach branch was created in the Sunday School Building St. Mary's Church in Westmoreland County. The Virginiana Room was created in the same year with the capability of preserving Virginia history. In 1979, Caroline County withdrew from the regional library system.

The National Endowment for the Humanities awards CRRL with a $30,000 grant for renovations to the headquarters branch in the City of Fredericksburg In 1980. In order to receive the grant, $90,000 was required to be raised by the community. In 1981, a federal grant in the amount of $69,000 was given to CRRL for a computerized microfilm cataloging system.

Donna Cote became the Library Director of CRRL in 1981. In 1985, library broadcast on television. Also, the Alliance for Literacy was created. In 1986, Music of the Steps program began at the Headquarters library. Martha Hutzel, became the director in 2016 after Donna Cote retired following her 34 year tenure as library director from 1981-2015. The library is fine free on overdue materials as of January 2023. In 2024, Martha Hutzel retired. On October 1, 2024 Rebecca Purdy stepped into the role of executive director.

=== Technology ===
In 1990, librarians started to develop the Video Home System (VHS) and CDs collections at CRRL. A year later, in 1991, CRRL replaced their microfiche catalog in favor of an online computerized catalog. In 1992, CRRL becomes a lending library for the Virginia Department for the Deaf and Hard of Hearing. Starting in 1996, CRRL begins providing public internet access to its patrons. Soon after, in 1997, CRRL creates a website for the library system titled Planet CRRL. In 1999, Ask a CRRL Librarian service begins. The DVD collection is started in 2000. The Bill and Melinda Gates Foundation provided a grant to fund a public computer lab in 2001. In 2002, eBooks become available to the public and the library starts offering 24/7 online reference chat services. Followed closely in 2005, audiobooks become available to the public. 3d printers were introduced in Mobile MakerLabs in 2011. Shortly after, the first in branch MakerLab was operated out of the Howell Branch in the fall of 2013. In 2019, express checkouts became available. During the COVID-19 pandemic, a standalone maker's space, dubbed IdeaSpace, opened on December 17, 2020.

== Service area ==
According to the Institute of Museum and Library Services' FY 2016 Public Libraries Survey, the Central Rappahannock Regional Library system has a service area population of 310,665.

== Branches ==
- Fredericksburg Branch (Fredericksburg) established 1969 (formerly Lafayette school building).
- Howell Branch (Stafford) established 2010. (formerly England Run Branch)
- Porter Branch (Stafford) established 1992.
- Salem Church Branch (Spotsylvania) established 1994.
- Snow Branch (Spotsylvania) established 1983 (formerly Spotsylvania Courthouse Branch).
- Towne Centre Branch (Spotsylvania) established 2018.
- Cooper Branch (Westmoreland) established 2000.
- Montross Branch (Westmoreland) established 2002.
- Newton Branch (Westmoreland) established 2001.

== Services ==
- Print, Audio, and Video Collections
- Digital Collection
- Computer and Wifi Access
- Genealogy Services
- Virginia Historical Resources
- Interlibrary Loan
- Meeting Rooms
- Access Services
- Library on the Go
- Exam Proctoring
- 3D Printers
- 3D Scanner
- Drawing Tablets
- Sewing Machines
- Serger Machine
- AV Booth
- Tech on the Go
- Notary Services
- Book Sales
- Training On Demand
