= Amanda Batten =

American politician (born 1979)

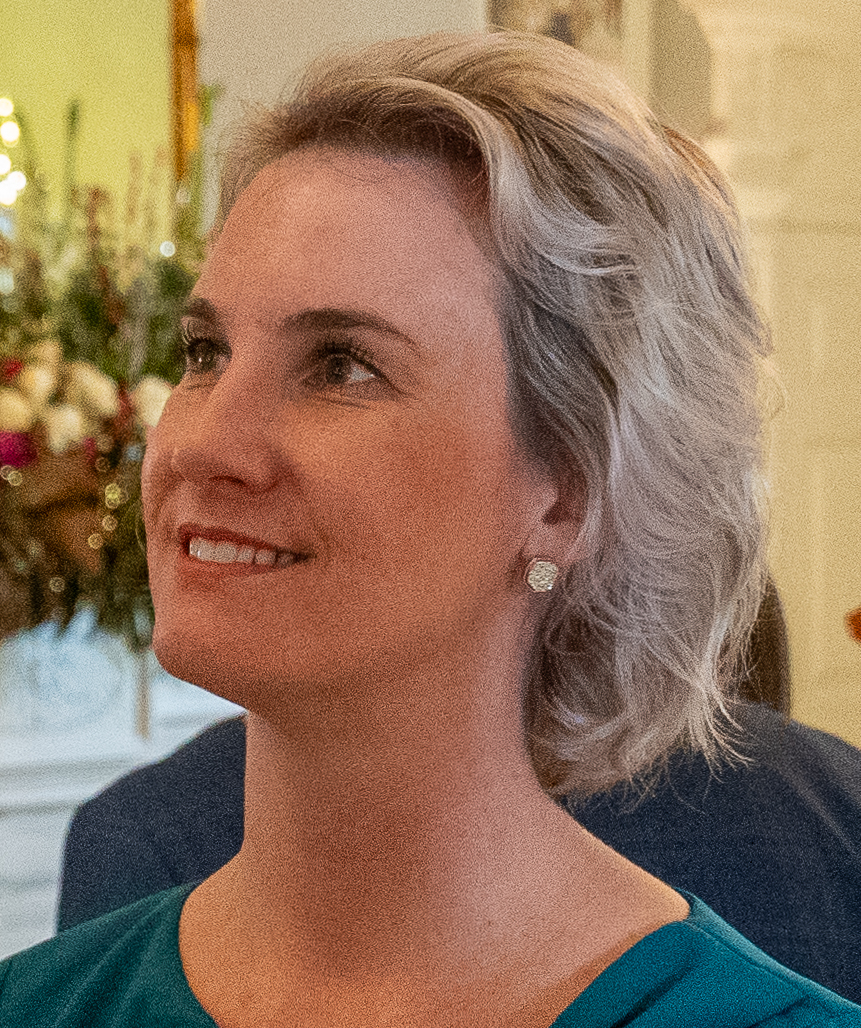
- Batten in 2024

Member of the Virginia House of Delegates
- In office January 8, 2020 – January 14, 2026
- Preceded by: Brenda Pogge
- Succeeded by: Jessica Anderson
- Constituency: 96th district (2020–2024); 71st district (2024–2026)

Personal details
- Born: 1979 (age 46–47) Washington, D.C.
- Party: Republican
- Spouse: Richard Batten
- Children: 1
- Education: Frederick Community College; Ashford University
- Profession: Legislative aide
- Committees: Education; Public Safety
- Website: amandabatten.com

Amanda E. Batten (born 1979) is an American politician. A member of the Republican Party, she was elected to the Virginia House of Delegates in 2019 and was re-elected twice. In 2025, Batten ran for a fourth term, but lost to Democrat Jessica Anderson.

== Political career ==
Batten spent about ten years working as a legislative aide in the Virginia General Assembly. She worked for Senator Tommy Norment and Delegate Brenda Pogge. She was also employed as a fundraising manager for the Medical Society of Virginia.

In March 2019, Pogge announced her retirement from the House of Delegates, and endorsed Batten as her replacement. Batten defeated former delegate Melanie Rapp Beale in the June primary by a 62-38 margin. Batten's top campaign issues were workforce development and ending a regional sales tax on Virginia's Historic Triangle. In the November general election, Batten defeated pediatrician Mark Downey by a 52-46 margin.

In their 2021 rematch, Batten again defeated Downey, this time with a 55.8-44 margin.

At the beginning of the 2022 Virginia General Assembly session, she was elected House Majority Caucus Chair.
