= Jo Ann Davis =

American politician (1950–2007)

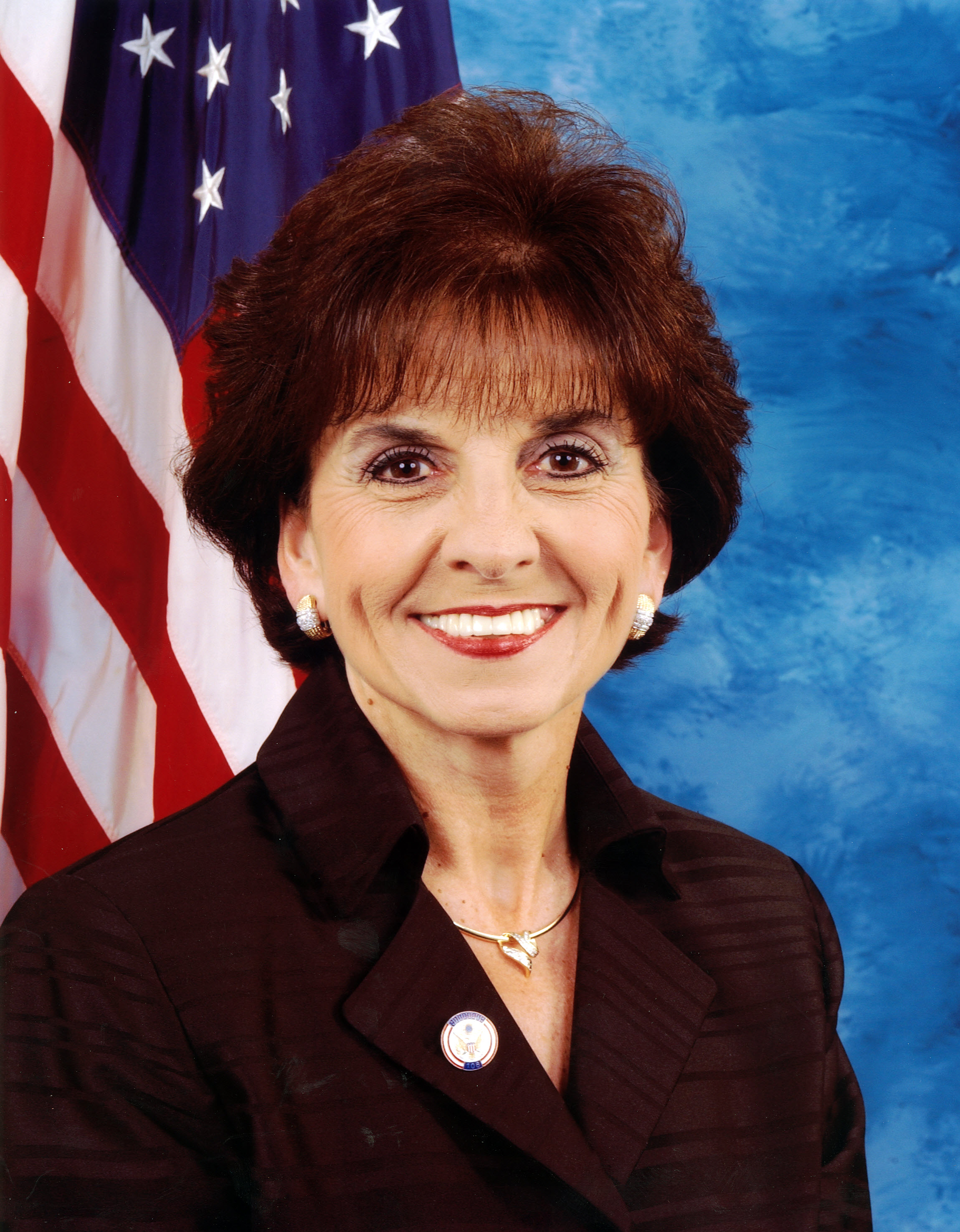

Member of the U.S. House of Representatives from Virginia's 1st district
- In office January 3, 2001 – October 6, 2007
- Preceded by: Herbert H. Bateman
- Succeeded by: Rob Wittman

Member of the Virginia House of Delegates from the 96th district
- In office January 14, 1998 – January 3, 2001
- Preceded by: Shirley Cooper
- Succeeded by: Melanie Rapp

Personal details
- Born: Jo Ann Sides; June 29, 1950 Rowan County, North Carolina, U.S.
- Died: October 6, 2007 (aged 57) Gloucester Courthouse, Virginia, U.S.
- Party: Republican
- Spouse: Chuck Davis
- Education: Hampton Roads Business College
- Occupation: Real estate executive

Jo Ann Davis (née Sides; June 29, 1950 – October 6, 2007) was an American politician, businesswoman, and realtor who served as the U.S. representative for Virginia's 1st congressional district from 2001 until her death in 2007. A member of the Republican Party, she previously served as a member of the Virginia House of Delegates from 1998 to 2001. Davis was the second woman and first Republican woman elected to Congress from Virginia.

== Early life and education ==
Jo Ann Sides was born in Rowan County, North Carolina, but lived in Virginia starting when she was nine years old. She graduated from Kecoughtan High School in Hampton, Virginia. Davis attended Hampton Roads Business College.

== Political career ==
Davis worked in real estate before she was elected to the Virginia House of Delegates in 1997. She was re-elected in 1999.

=== Congressional campaigns ===
In 2000, 1st District Representative Herbert H. Bateman, a 72-year-old incumbent, announced his retirement because of health concerns. He died on September 11, 2000. Davis ran for and won the Republican nomination to succeed him, despite Governor Jim Gilmore's having endorsed her primary opponent; she beat out four other opponents in the primary. In November 2000, she received 58% of the vote to win the seat, defeating Democrat Lawrence A. Davies, and Independents Sharon A. Wood and Josh Billings.

She was the second Virginia woman (after Democrat Leslie Byrne who served one term from the neighboring 11th district from 1993 to 1995), and the first Virginia Republican woman elected to the House in her own right. The First is one of the more Republican-leaning districts in Virginia. No Democrat has won the district since 1977, and only the southwestern 9th district and the Shenandoah Valley-based 6th district are significantly more Republican, although the Southside-based 5th district is about as Republican and has never voted for a Democratic presidential nominee since 1948. Davis was reelected unopposed in 2002. She defeated Independent challenger William A. Lee in 2004. She won a fourth term in 2006 against token Democratic opposition, defeating Democrat Shawn M. O'Donnell and Independent Marvin F. Pixton III. Unlike Bateman, who was relatively moderate by Southern Republican standards, Davis was strongly conservative, especially on social issues.

=== Tenure ===
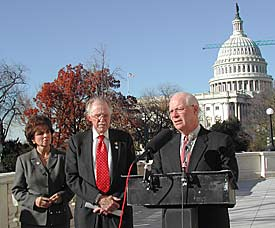
Rep. Davis (left) (R-VA) joined Reps. Ben Cardin (at lectern) (D-MD) and Roscoe Bartlett (center) (R-MD) in calling for a study of homeland security needs of the National Capital region, including Maryland, Virginia, and the District of Columbia.

During her tenure, Davis secured $169 million (after authorizing $229 million) for construction on the Navy's next-generation aircraft carrier, CVN-21, and $47 million for the removal of a portion of the James River Reserve Fleet, otherwise known as the Ghost Fleet. In 2002 she voted in favor of the Authorization for Use of Military Force Against Iraq Resolution of 2002.

In March 2001, the House passed Davis's first piece of legislation – HR 1015, the SGLI Adjustment Act, which increased the amount of Servicemembers' Group Life Insurance paid to beneficiaries of members of the Armed Forces who died in the performance of their duty between November 1, 2000, and April 1, 2001. She advocated tax cuts, and believed that the federal government must rein in growth and spending. She was the ranking Republican on the House Intelligence Subcommittee on Intelligence Policy.

=== Voting record ===
Davis was endorsed by several groups, including the Virginia Sheriff's Association; the Peninsula Housing and Builders Association; the Virginia Society for Human Life; the NRA Political Victory Fund, and the Madison Project. She received a 93% rating from the National Federation of Independent Businesses for the 109th Congress, a grade of 95% from the Family Foundation of Virginia, and an "A" rating from the NRA Virginia Political Preference Chart. Other ratings included a 0% from the National Education Association, a 23% from the League of Conservation Voters, a 0% from the Children's Defense Fund, and a 4% from the American Civil Liberties Union.

== Personal life ==
Davis was one of four Pentecostals in the 109th Congress. The others were Todd Tiahrt of Kansas, Tim Johnson of Illinois, and Marilyn Musgrave of Colorado.

In 1974 she married Chuck Davis; the couple had two sons and were married for 33 years.

Davis was diagnosed in September 2005 with breast cancer and underwent a partial mastectomy on July 5, 2006, at the George Washington University Medical Center in Washington, D.C. The pathology report indicated that there was no further evidence of cancer, and Davis stated that she would return to work as usual. She attended House sessions until shortly before her death.

=== Death ===
Davis died on October 6, 2007, at her home in Gloucester, Virginia. She was reportedly recovering from a second bout with breast cancer, but her condition deteriorated rapidly over the week preceding her death. Davis was survived by her husband, Chuck Davis, two sons, and 2 grandchildren.

== Electoral history ==
2000 Virginia's 1st congressional district election
Party	Candidate	Votes	%
Republican	Jo Ann Davis	151,344	57.5
Democratic	Lawrence A. Davies	97,399	37.0
Independent	Sharon A. Wood	9,652	3.7
Independent	Josh Billings	4,082	1.6
Write-in		537	0.2
Total votes		263,014	100.00
Republican hold			

2002 Virginia's 1st congressional district election
Party	Candidate	Votes	%
Republican	Jo Ann Davis (Incumbent)	113,168	95.9
Write-in		4,829	4.1
Total votes		117,997	100.00
Republican hold			

2004 Virginia's 1st congressional district election
Party	Candidate	Votes	%
Republican	Jo Ann Davis (Incumbent)	225,071	78.6
Independent	William A. Lee	57,434	20.0
Write-in		4,029	1.4
Total votes		286,534	100.00
Republican hold			

2006 Virginia's 1st congressional district election
Party	Candidate	Votes	%
Republican	Jo Ann Davis (Incumbent)	143,889	63.0
Democratic	Shawn M. O'Donnell	81,083	35.5
Independent	Marvin F. Pixton III	3,236	1.4
Write-in		326	0.1
Total votes		228,534	100.00
Republican hold			

== See also ==
- List of members of the United States Congress who died in office (2000–present)#2000s
- Women in the United States House of Representatives

Virginia House of Delegates
Preceded by Shirley Cooper	Virginia Delegate for the 96th District; 1998–2001	Succeeded by Melanie Rapp
U.S. House of Representatives
Preceded by Herbert H. Bateman	Member of the U.S. House of Representatives from Virginia's 1st congressional district 2001–2007	Succeeded by Rob Wittman
