= James Walkinshaw =

American politician (born 1982)

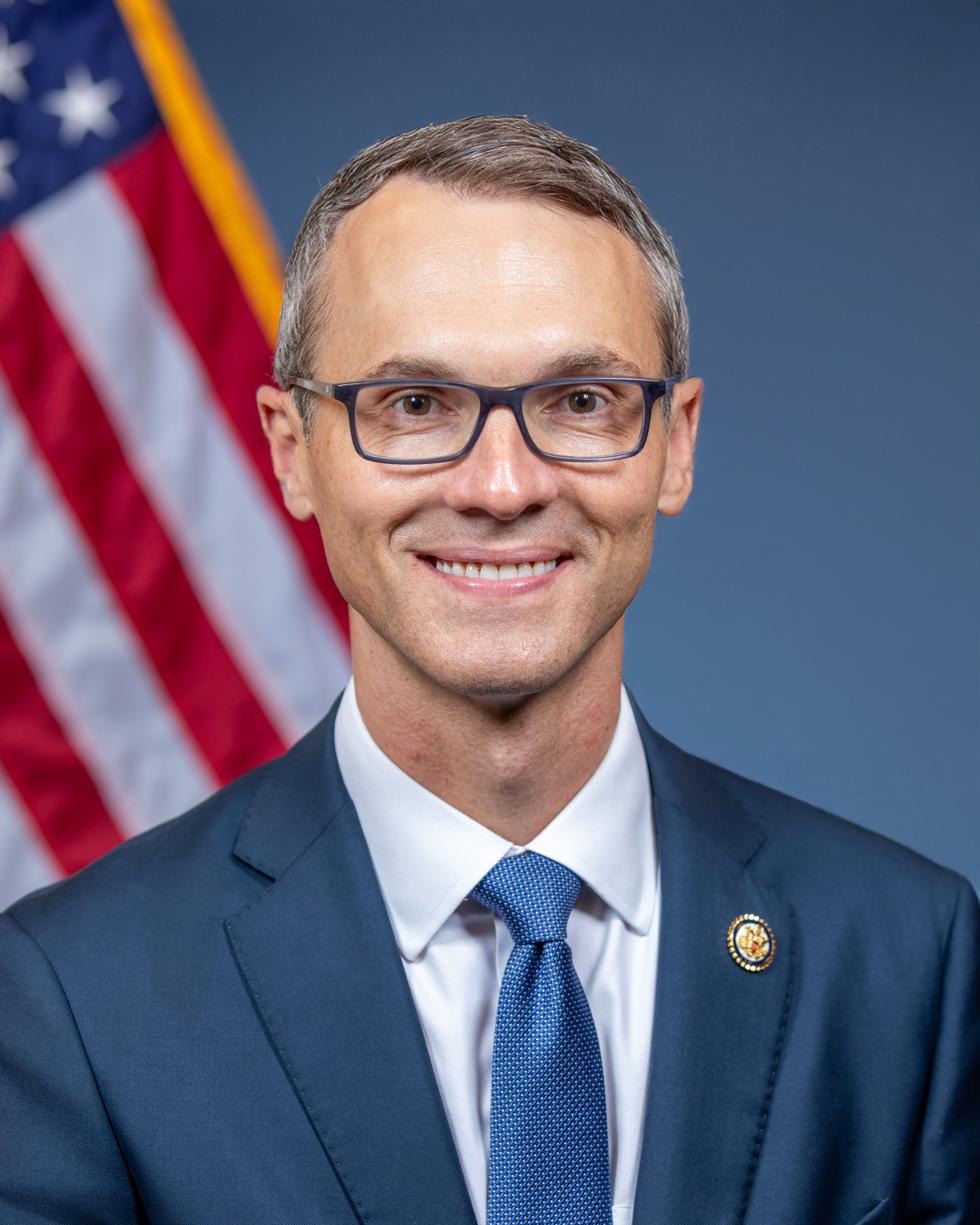
- Official portrait, 2025

Member of the U.S. House of Representatives from Virginia's 11th district
- Incumbent
- Assumed office September 9, 2025 (Note: Walkinshaw's official service begins on the date of the special election, while he was not sworn in until September 10, 2025.)
- Preceded by: Gerry Connolly

Member of the Fairfax County Board of Supervisors from the Braddock district
- In office January 1, 2020 – September 10, 2025
- Preceded by: John Cook
- Succeeded by: Rachna Sizemore Heizer

Personal details
- Born: James Robert Walkinshaw; October 22, 1982 (age 44) Arlington, Virginia, U.S.
- Party: Democratic
- Spouse: Yvette Peña
- Children: 1
- Education: New York University (BA)
- Website: House website Campaign website

James Robert Walkinshaw (born October 22, 1982) is an American politician and former congressional aide serving as the U.S. representative for Virginia's 11th congressional district since September 2025. A member of the Democratic Party, he previously served as a member of the Fairfax County Board of Supervisors from the Braddock District from 2020 until his resignation in 2025.

A native of Northern Virginia, Walkinshaw began a political career in the late 2000s. From 2009 to 2019, he served as the chief of staff to U.S. Representative Gerry Connolly. In 2019, he was elected to the Fairfax County Board of Supervisors, and re-elected in 2023.

When Connolly announced his retirement from Congress in 2025, he endorsed Walkinshaw to succeed him. Connolly died from cancer shortly afterwards, and Walkinshaw became the party's nominee for the special election to finish his term. Walkinshaw won the special election on September 9, 2025, defeating Republican Stewart Whitson. He won re-election on November 3, 2026, defeating Republican Arthur Purves.

== Early life and education ==
Walkinshaw was born in 1982 in Arlington County, Virginia and grew up in Prince William County. He graduated from New York University in 2005 with a Bachelor of Arts in politics.

== Early political career ==
Following his graduation from New York University, Walkinshaw became involved in Democratic politics in Northern Virginia, managing Gerry Connolly's 2007 campaign for Chairman of the Fairfax County Board of Supervisors and Connolly's successful 2008 campaign for the United States House of Representatives. Walkinshaw served as Connolly's chief of staff from 2009 until 2019.

=== Fairfax County Board of Supervisors ===
In 2019, Walkinshaw was elected to the Fairfax County Board of Supervisors, succeeding John C. Cook to represent the Braddock District. He chaired the Board's Legislative Committee and Environmental Committee, the VRE Operations Board, and the National Capital Region Transportation Planning Board. He was re-elected in 2023.

During his tenure on the board, Walkinshaw pushed for Fairfax County to transition its vehicle fleet to electric or hybrid vehicles, supported a prohibition on firearms in county buildings, and helped advance the county's first collective-bargaining ordinance. He also worked to advance a long-delayed project to install solar panels at a county landfill in Lorton, including securing the state legislative approval required for the project.

Walkinshaw represented Fairfax County on the National Capital Region Transportation Planning Board beginning in 2020. He served as the board's vice chair and as chair of its Access for All Advisory Committee in 2024, and was elected chair of the Transportation Planning Board for 2025.

== U.S. House of Representatives (2025–present) ==
=== Elections ===
==== 2025 special election ====
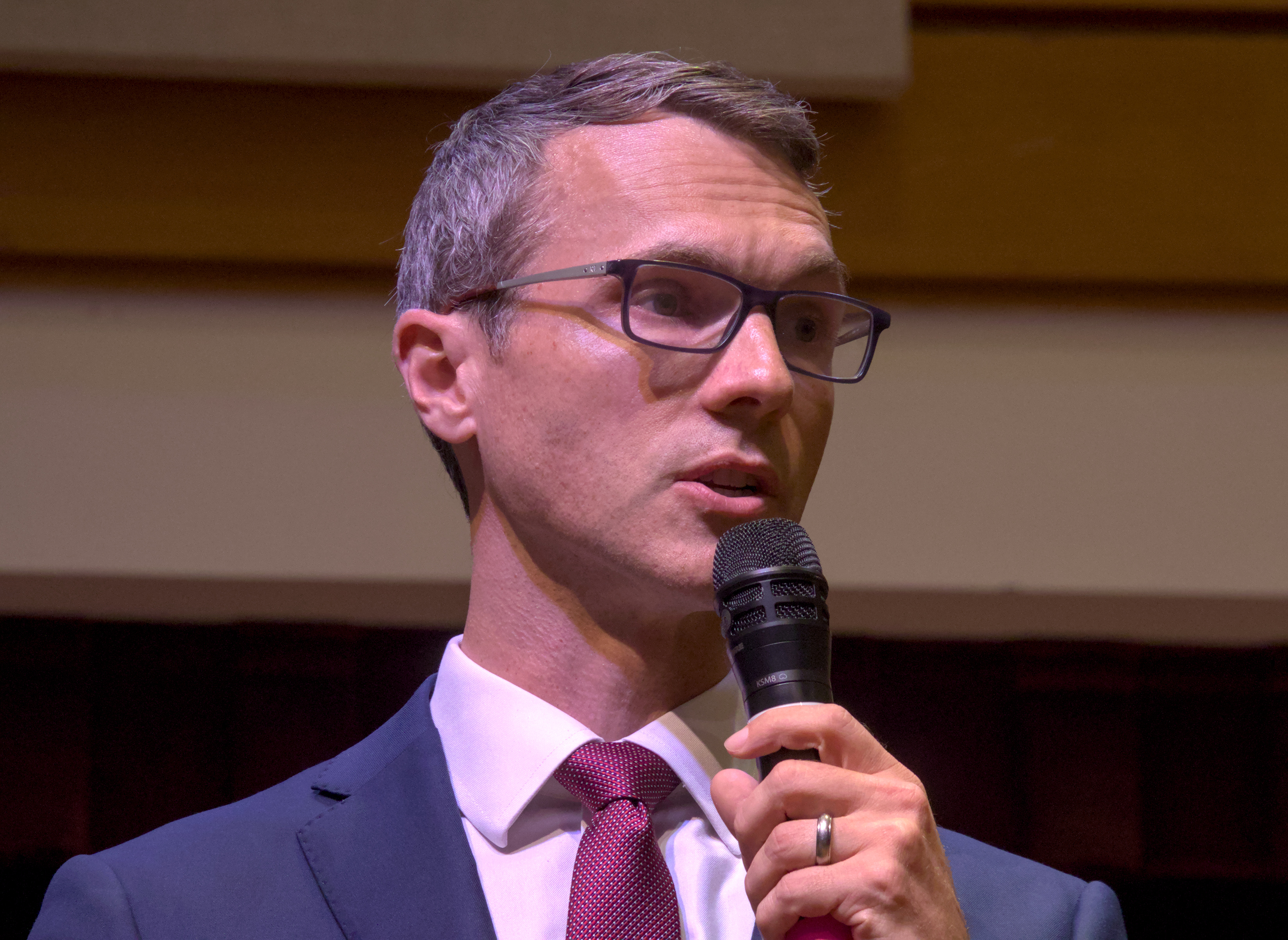
Walkinshaw speaking at a Democratic forum in the primary

In April 2025, Representative Gerry Connolly announced that he would not seek reelection in 2026 due to health concerns. Smitty Connolly, his wife, publicly shared that Connolly had asked to meet with Walkinshaw following his decision to not seek reelection, and asked him to consider running to succeed him. Smitty confirmed that Connolly had asked his long-time chief of staff to run for Congress after learning that his cancer had returned. Walkinshaw announced his candidacy later that week, and Connolly endorsed him.

On May 21, 2025, Connolly died from esophageal cancer, and Virginia governor Glenn Youngkin announced a special election to fill the seat, set for September 9, 2025.

Under Virginia law, special elections must take place on a Tuesday and at least 55 days before a regularly scheduled primary or general election. With statewide elections for governor, lieutenant governor, and attorney general set for November 4, Youngkin selected the latest Tuesday available within that legal window for the special election.

The Democratic Party selected its nominee in the race through a firehouse primary on June 28, 2025. Despite criticism over the timing, the Fairfax County Democratic Committee (FCDC) pushed back, emphasizing that the election calendar and format was largely shaped by constraints set in motion by Republican Governor Glenn Youngkin. The primary was the most participated-in special primary in Virginia's history, with 37,264 votes.

Walkinshaw defeated a 10-candidate Democratic primary field for the seat with 60% of the vote on June 28, 2025. He went on to defeat the Republican by approximately 50 percentage points in the general election on September 9 and was sworn in the following day.

==== 2026 ====
On November 3, 2026, Walkinshaw was reelected for a second term in Virginia's 11th Congressional District, defeating Republican Arthur Purves.

=== Tenure ===
Shortly after taking office in September 2025, Walkinshaw assumed lead sponsorship of four federal-workforce bills previously sponsored by his predecessor, Gerry Connolly. The measures included the Federal Adjustment of Income Rates (FAIR) Act, which proposed annual pay increases for federal employees; the Equal COLA Act, concerning cost-of-living adjustments for federal retirees; the Family Building FEHB Fairness Act, which would expand fertility-treatment coverage under the Federal Employees Health Benefits Program; and the Saving the Civil Service Act, which sought to restrict the creation of new federal job schedules that remove civil-service protections without congressional approval.

In February 2026, Walkinshaw, Representative Steny Hoyer, and Senator Chris Van Hollen launched the Federal Workforce Caucus, a bicameral caucus focused on federal workforce issues and the merit-based civil service.

Walkinshaw has also worked on federal information technology and cybersecurity oversight. In June 2026, he and Republican representative Don Bacon introduced legislation that would require the Department of Homeland Security to report to Congress on gaps preventing the department from fully meeting federal event-logging requirements. That month, Walkinshaw also outlined proposals to resume and modernize the FITARA scorecard, strengthen federal cybersecurity and technology oversight, and address the use of artificial intelligence in federal agencies.

=== Committee assignments ===
Walkinshaw's committee assignments for the 119th Congress include:

- Committee on Homeland Security
- Committee on Oversight and Government Reform

=== Caucus memberships ===
- Congressional Equality Caucus
- New Democrat Coalition
- Congressional Asian Pacific American Caucus
- House Baltic Caucus
- Rare Disease Caucus

== Political positions ==
=== Economic issues ===
Walkinshaw opposes the tariff and trade policies of the second Trump administration. He has also criticized the One Big Beautiful Bill Act, saying that over 320,000 Virginians would lose healthcare access as a result of the bill and that he would work to repeal the bill.

=== Education ===
Walkinshaw says that curriculum decisions "are made and should be made at the local and to some degree state level" and has dismissed claims that the United States Department of Education determines curriculum in local school districts. He opposes President Donald Trump's efforts to "dismantle" the Department of Education.

Walkinshaw has opposed efforts to dismantle the U.S. Department of Education. He supports full federal funding for Title I and IDEA, as well as expanding assistance for military-connected students through the Impact Aid program. His other education policy priorities include making higher education more affordable, expanding access to workforce and technical training programs, reducing student debt, expanding early childhood education, investing in high-quality teacher training, and addressing disparities in school funding to ensure that every child has the opportunity to succeed.

=== Federal workers ===
Walkinshaw represents the 11th congressional district in Northern Virginia, which is home to a large number of federal workers.

Walkinshaw denounced Trump's cuts at federal agencies, saying federal workers are "under attack" by the administration. He believes Congress should launch aggressive investigations against the second Trump administration through independent inspectors general and the Government Accountability Office to uncover the extent of the damage done to the federal government and federal workforce.

=== Foreign policy ===
James Walkinshaw answering a question about Gaza

Walkinshaw supports providing aid to Ukraine in its war against Russia. He has criticized Trump's "on-again-off-again support" for Ukraine and called it beneficial to Russia and harmful to America's European allies.

Walkinshaw has described Israel as a "key U.S. ally strategically" and supports maintaining U.S. military assistance to the country. However, he has also called for a ceasefire to its war in Gaza and criticized the country for blocking humanitarian aid to the territory. In 2026, he voted against an amendment by Thomas Massie to a State Department appropriations bill to eliminate all regularly appropriated US aid to Israel, but stated that he supported conditioning military aid for Israel.

Walkinshaw believes that diplomacy is essential in preventing Iran from producing nuclear weapons. He called the Trump administration's military strikes on Iranian nuclear sites "unconstitutional".

Walkinshaw says Trump is "on the right path" when it comes to challenging China's economic power, but is not "addressing it in a strategic way." He objects to Trump's trade and tariff policies but agrees with his argument that China "has been operating unfairly within the global trade and economic regime for a long time".

=== Immigration ===
Walkinshaw opposes the immigration policy of the second Trump administration, stating that "Trump's agenda to terrorize and deport law-abiding families is a distraction from focusing on the small number who commit violent crimes". He supports comprehensive immigration reform and a path to citizenship.

Walkinshaw has repeatedly opposed additional federal funding for Immigration and Customs Enforcement (ICE) and Customs and Border Protection (CBP) until reforms to immigration and enforcement practices are delivered. His proposed reforms include requiring judicial warrants for targeted enforcement actions, prohibiting agents from wearing masks, requiring visible agency identification, protecting sensitive locations such as schools and churches, prohibiting racial profiling, strengthening use-of-force standards, expanding state and local oversight, improving detention safeguards, mandating body cameras, and putting an end to militarized policing tactics by Department of Homeland Security officers.

Walkinshaw has also supported the American Dream and Promise Act, which provides permanent protections and a pathway to citizenship for Dreamers, Temporary Protected Status (TPS) recipients, and Deferred Enforced Departure (DED) holders. His stated priorities also include reducing visa backlogs, strengthening worker protections, and making the system more humane and efficient. He has opposed immigration enforcement measures that he argues undermine due process and the rights of immigrant communities.

=== Abortion ===
Walkinshaw is pro-choice.

== Personal life ==
Walkinshaw lives in Annandale, Virginia with his wife, Yvette Peña and their son.

== Electoral history ==
2025 Virginia 11th congressional district special Democratic primary
| Party | Candidate | Votes | % |
|---|---|---|---|
| Democratic | James Walkinshaw | 22,537 | 59.67% |
| Democratic | Irene Shin | 5,613 | 14.23% |
| Democratic | Stella Pekarsky | 5,271 | 13.36% |
| Democratic | Amy Roma | 2,807 | 7.12% |
| Democratic | Dan Lee | 734 | 1.86% |
| Democratic | Leopoldo Martínez Nucete | 533 | 1.35% |
| Democratic | Amy Papanu | 415 | 1.05% |
| Democratic | Priya Punnoose | 241 | 0.61% |
| Democratic | Candice Bennett | 199 | 0.50% |
| Democratic | Ross William Branstetter IV | 25 | 0.06% |
| Total votes | | 39,444 | 100.00% |

2025 Virginia 11th congressional district special general election
| Party | Candidate | Votes | % |
|---|---|---|---|
| Democratic | James Walkinshaw | 113,596 | 75.14 |
| Republican | Stewart Whitson | 37,297 | 24.67 |
| Write-in | | 287 | 0.19 |
| Total votes | | 151,180 | 100.00 |

U.S. House of Representatives
| Preceded by Gerry Connolly | Member of the U.S. House of Representatives from Virginia's 11th congressional district 2025–present | Incumbent |
U.S. order of precedence (ceremonial)
| Preceded by Jimmy Patronis | United States representatives by seniority 425th | Succeeded by Adelita Grijalva |
