= 2025 Virginia's 11th congressional district special election =

- September 9, 2025

Virginia's 11th congressional district
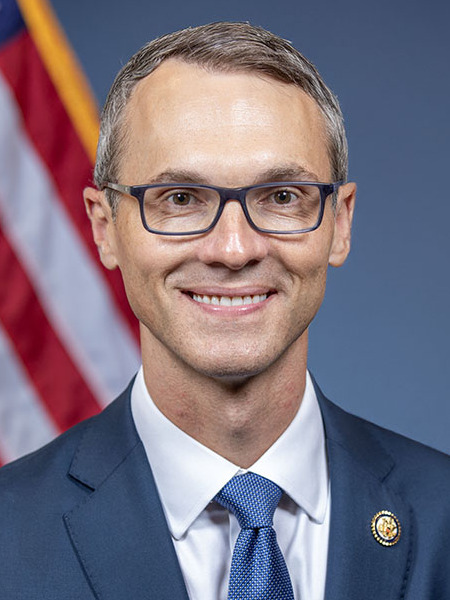

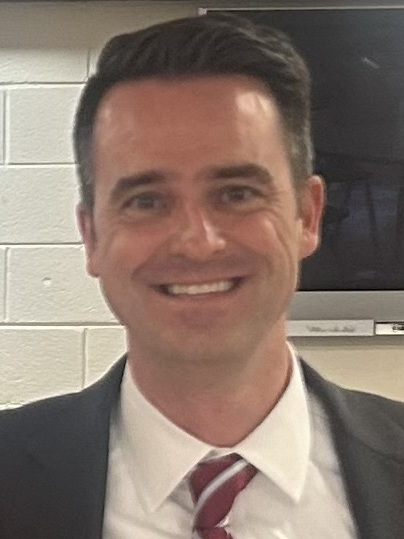
Nominee	James Walkinshaw	Stewart Whitson
Party	Democratic	Republican
Popular vote	113,596	37,297
Percentage	75.14%	24.67%
- Walkinshaw: 50–60% 60–70% 70–80% 80–90% 90%+
U.S. Representative before election
Gerry Connolly
Democratic
Elected U.S. Representative
James Walkinshaw
Democratic

The 2025 Virginia's 11th congressional district special election to determine the member of the United States House of Representatives for Virginia's 11th congressional district was held on September 9, 2025. The seat became vacant following the death of Democrat Gerry Connolly on May 21, 2025. The district was considered safely Democratic.

Fairfax County Supervisor James Walkinshaw won the Democratic primary with 59% of the vote, defeating Irene Shin and Stella Pekarsky. Stewart Whitson, a former FBI agent, won the GOP primary with 39% of the vote. In the general election, Walkinshaw outraised Whitson by $1 million to $224 thousand.

In the September 9 general election, Walkinshaw defeated Whitson by roughly 50 percentage points, a leftward shift from 2024.

== Background ==
Incumbent representative Gerry Connolly died of esophageal cancer on May 21, 2025. Connolly had previously announced that he would not seek re-election in 2026. He was first elected in 2008, and had announced his cancer diagnosis shortly after being re-elected in 2024. In the United States, vacancies in the House must be filled by special elections. Under Virginia law, the governor schedules the special election and political parties handle their nominating processes themselves. Republican Governor Glenn Youngkin called a special election to be held on September 9, 2025. The deadline for candidates to file a candidacy was July 11, 2025.

Based primarily in Fairfax County, this suburban district is widely regarded by political analysts to be a safely Democratic seat. The last time a Republican was elected to this district was in 2006, when Tom Davis was re‑elected. As of 2025, the seat has remained under Democratic control ever since, and Connolly won it by 67% to 33% in 2024.

== Democratic primary ==
=== Campaign ===
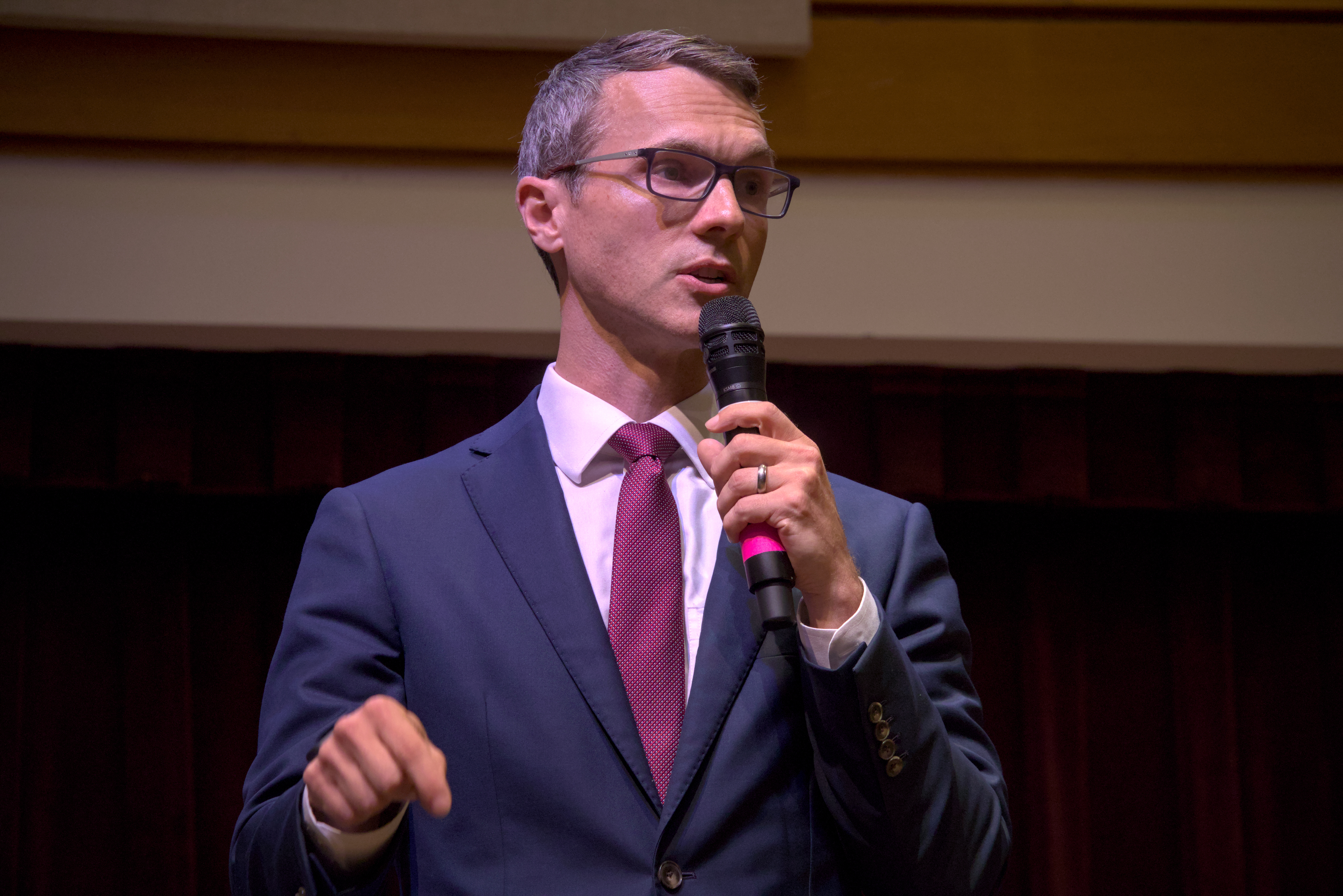
Eventual nominee James Walkinshaw speaking at a Democratic forum

Opponents of James Walkinshaw, including Stella Pekarsky and Irene Shin, have alleged that the primary election was biased in favor of Walkinshaw, pointing to the short timeline for the election and the party's choice not to use ranked-choice voting in the primary. Pekarsky, Shin, and other candidates have expressed frustration with delays in the party releasing voting locations and other information. Other candidates have shared concerns that party volunteers have publicly displayed a preference for Walkinshaw while working on behalf of the party.

Fairfax County Democratic Committee chair Aaron Yohai denied Shin and Pekarsky’s claims, blaming Virginia governor Glenn Youngkin for scheduling the election so soon, which he said caused the delays in information. Walkinshaw told Virginia Scope the complaints were candidates "trying to work the refs."

On June 24, Connolly's social media accounts posted messages of support for Walkinshaw, causing shock and controversy on social media.

=== Candidates ===
==== Nominee ====
- James Walkinshaw, Fairfax County supervisor (2019–2025) and former chief of staff to Gerry Connolly

==== Eliminated in primary ====
- Candice Bennett, member of the Fairfax County Planning Commission (2020–present)
- Ross William Branstetter IV, businessman
- Dan Lee, healthcare technology entrepreneur
- Leopoldo Martínez Nucete, former senior counselor of the Minority Business Development Agency (2024–2025) and former deputy to the National Assembly of Venezuela (2000–2005)
- Amy Papanu, former CIA operations officer and national security expert
- Stella Pekarsky, state senator from the 36th district (2024–present)
- Priya Punnoose, psychiatrist
- Amy Roma, energy policy lawyer
- Irene Shin, state delegate from the 8th district (2022–present)

==== Declined ====
- Jennifer Boysko, state senator from the 38th district (2019–present) and candidate for Virginia's 10th congressional district in 2024 (endorsed Walkinshaw and Shin)
- Steve Descano, Fairfax County Commonwealth's Attorney (2020–present) (endorsed Walkinshaw)
- Eileen Filler-Corn, former Speaker of the Virginia House of Delegates (2020–2022) from the 41st district (2010–2024) and candidate for Virginia's 10th congressional district in 2024 (endorsed Walkinshaw)
- Dan Helmer, state delegate from the 10th district (2020–present) and candidate for Virginia's 10th congressional district in 2018 and 2024
- Dave Marsden, state senator from the 35th district (2010–present) (endorsed Walkinshaw)
- Jeff McKay, chair of the Fairfax County Board of Supervisors (2020–present) (endorsed Walkinshaw)
- Saddam Azlan Salim, state senator from the 37th district (2024–present) (endorsed Pekarsky)

=== Endorsements ===
Candice Bennett

Local officials

- Alyia Gaskins, mayor of Alexandria (2025–present)
Stella Pekarsky

State legislators

- Louise Lucas, president pro tempore of the Virginia Senate (2020–present) from the 18th district (1992–present)
- Holly Seibold, state delegate from the 12th district (2023–present)
- Scott Surovell, majority leader of the Virginia Senate (2024–present) from the 34th district (2016–present)
Irene Shin

U.S. senators

- Andy Kim, U.S. senator from New Jersey (2024–present)

U.S. representatives

- Judy Chu, U.S. representative from California's 28th congressional district (2009–present)

State legislators

- Ghazala Hashmi, state senator from the 15th district (2020–2025) and Democratic nominee in the 2025 Virginia lieutenant gubernatorial election

Organizations

- AAPI Victory Fund

Individuals

- David Hogg, former vice chair of the Democratic National Committee (2025)
James Walkinshaw

U.S. representatives

- Don Beyer, U.S. representative from Virginia's 8th congressional district (2015–present)
- Gerry Connolly, former U.S. representative from Virginia's 11th congressional district (2009–2025) (deceased; prior to his death)
- Eugene Vindman, U.S. representative from Virginia's 7th congressional district (2025–present)
- Jennifer Wexton, former U.S. representative from Virginia's 10th congressional district (2019–2025)

Statewide officials

- Terry McAuliffe, former Governor of Virginia (2014–2018)

State legislators

- Jennifer Boysko, state senator from the 38th district (2019–present)
- David Bulova, state delegate from the 11th district (2006–2026)
- Eileen Filler-Corn, former Speaker of the Virginia House of Delegates (2020–2022) from the 41st district (2010–2024)
- Dave Marsden, state senator from the 35th district (2010–present)
- Briana Sewell, state delegate from the 25th district (2022–present)
- Rip Sullivan, state delegate from the 6th district (2024–present)
- Vivian Watts, state delegate from the 39th district (1996–present)

County officials

- Walter Alcorn, Fairfax County supervisor from the Hunter Mill district (2020–present)
- Jimmy Bierman, Fairfax County supervisor from the Dranesville district (2024–present)
- Steve Descano, Fairfax County Commonwealth's Attorney (2020–present)
- Andres Jimenez, Fairfax County supervisor from the Mason district (2024–present)
- Rodney Lusk, Fairfax County supervisor from the Franconia district (2020–present)
- Jeff McKay, chair of the Fairfax County Board of Supervisors (2020–present)
- Dalia Palchik, Fairfax County supervisor from the Providence district (2020–present) and former member of the Fairfax County Public School Board
- Kathy Smith, Fairfax County supervisor from the Sully district (2016–present)
- Dan Storck, Fairfax County supervisor from the Mount Vernon district (2016–present)

=== Polling ===
Poll source	Date(s) administered	Sample size (Note: Key: A – all adults RV – registered voters LV – likely voters V – unclear)	Margin of error	Joshua Aisen	Candice Bennett	Dan Lee	Leopoldo Martínez Nucete	Stella Pekarsky	Amy Roma	Irene Shin	James Walkinshaw	Undecided
Lake Research Partners (D) (Note: Poll sponsored by Walkinshaw's campaign)	June 5–9, 2025	500 (LV)	± 4.4%	2%	2%	2%	1%	8%	1%	6%	41%	36%

=== Debates and forums ===
2025 Virginia's 11th congressional district special election Democratic primary debates and forums
No.	Date	Host	Moderator	Link	Democratic	Democratic	Democratic	Democratic	Democratic	Democratic	Democratic	Democratic	Democratic	Democratic
Key: P Participant A Absent N Not invited I Invited W Withdrawn														
Key: P Participant A Absent N Not invited I Invited W Withdrawn					Bennett	Branstetter	Lee	Martinez	Papanu	Pekarsky	Punnoose	Roma	Shin	Walkinshaw
1	June 24, 2025	WinDem	Suhas Subramanyam		P	A	P	P	P	P	P	P	P	P

=== Results ===
Democratic firehouse primary results
Party	Candidate	Votes	%
Democratic	James Walkinshaw	23,537	59.67%
Democratic	Irene Shin	5,613	14.23%
Democratic	Stella Pekarsky	5,271	13.36%
Democratic	Amy Roma	2,807	7.12%
Democratic	Dan Lee	734	1.86%
Democratic	Leopoldo Martínez Nucete	533	1.35%
Democratic	Amy Papanu	415	1.05%
Democratic	Priya Punnoose	241	0.61%
Democratic	Candice Bennett	199	0.50%
Democratic	Ross William Branstetter IV	25	0.06%
	Unallocated	69	0.17%
Total votes		39,444	100.00%

== Republican primary ==
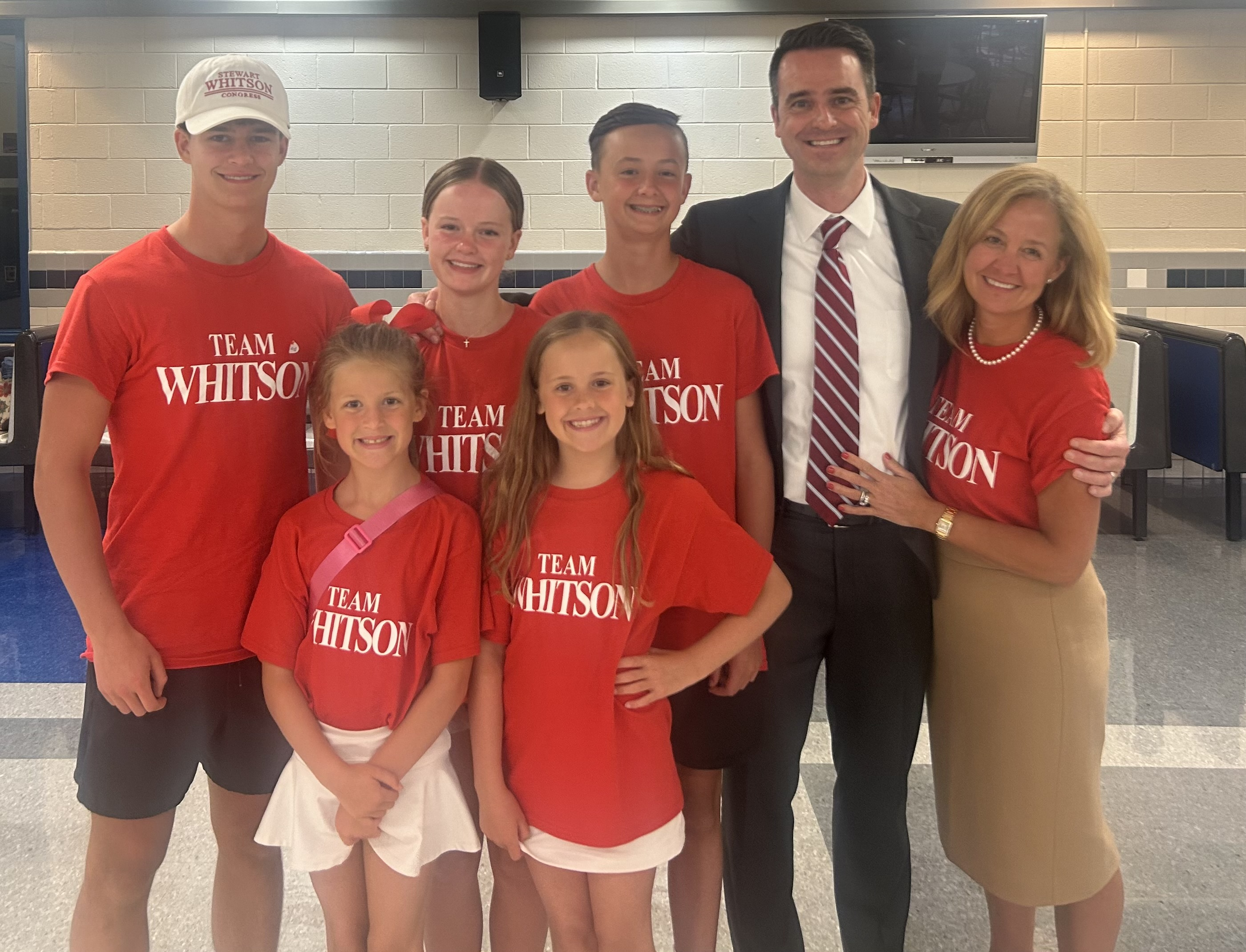
Whitson with his family on the day of nomination

The Republicans held a canvass to determine their nominee on June 28 at Fairfax High School, rather than run a full primary.

=== Candidates ===
==== Nominee ====
- Stewart Whitson, government relations professional

==== Eliminated in primary ====
- Nathan Headrick, banking executive
- Karina Lipsman, systems engineer and nominee for Virginia's 8th congressional district in 2022
- Arthur Purves, president of the Fairfax County Taxpayers Alliance
- Lucas Rand, hospital administrator
- Mike Van Meter, behavioral therapist and nominee for this district in 2024
- Sam Wong, U.S. Army veteran

=== Debates and forums ===
2025 Virginia's 11th congressional district special election Republican primary debates and forums
No.	Date	Host	Moderator	Link	Republican	Republican	Republican	Republican	Republican	Republican	Republican
Key: P Participant A Absent N Not invited I Invited W Withdrawn											
Key: P Participant A Absent N Not invited I Invited W Withdrawn					Headrick	Lipsman	Purves	Rand	Van Meter	Whitson	Wong
1	June 22, 2025	WMAL-FM	Vince Coglianese		A	P	A	P	P	P	P
2	June 23, 2025	WMAL-FM	Larry O'Connor		A	P	P	P	P	P	P

=== Results ===
Republican canvass results
Party	Candidate	Votes	%
Republican	Stewart Whitson	1,019	39.18%
Republican	Karina Lipsman	620	23.84%
Republican	Mike Van Meter	586	22.53%
Republican	Lucas Rand	198	7.61%
Republican	Sam Wong	99	3.81%
Republican	Nathan Headrick	40	1.54%
Republican	Arthur Purves	39	1.49%
Total votes		2,601	100.00%

== Independents ==
=== Failed to qualify ===
- Chandrashekar Tamirisa, sustainability leader

== General election ==
=== Debates and forums ===
2025 Virginia 11th congressional district special election debates and forums
No.	Date	Host	Moderator	Link	Participants	
P Participant A Absent N Non-invitee I Invitee W Withdrawn						
P Participant A Absent N Non-invitee I Invitee W Withdrawn					James Walkinshaw	Stewart Whitson
1	July 28, 2025	Reston Citizens Association	Lynne Mulston		P	P
2	August 18, 2025	League of Women Voters of the Fairfax Area	Catherine White		P	P

=== Post-primary endorsements ===
James Walkinshaw (D)

U.S. senators

- Mark Warner, U.S. senator from Virginia (2009–present)

U.S. representatives

- Abigail Spanberger, former U.S. representative from Virginia's 7th congressional district (2019–2025) and Democratic nominee in the 2025 Virginia gubernatorial election

State legislators

- Jay Jones, state delegate from the 89th district (2018–2021) and Democratic nominee in the 2025 Virginia Attorney General election
- Ghazala Hashmi, state senator from the 15th district (2020–2025) and Democratic nominee in the 2025 Virginia lieutenant gubernatorial election
Stewart Whitson (R)

Statewide officials

- Glenn Youngkin, incumbent governor (2022–2026)

County officials

- Pat Herrity, Fairfax County supervisor from the Springfield district (2008–present)

=== Predictions ===
Source	Ranking	As of
The Cook Political Report	Solid D	August 23, 2025
Inside Elections	Solid D	August 28, 2025
Sabato's Crystal Ball	Safe D	August 29, 2025

=== Results ===
2025 Virginia's 11th congressional district special election
Party	Candidate	Votes	%
Democratic	James Walkinshaw	113,596	75.14
Republican	Stewart Whitson	37,297	24.67
Write-in		287	0.19
Total votes		151,180	100.00
Democratic hold			

==== By county and independent city ====
Locality	James Walkinshaw Democratic		Stewart Whitson Republican		Write-in Various		Margin		Total votes cast
Locality	#	%	#	%	#	%	#	%	Total votes cast
Fairfax City	4,001	74.52%	1,362	25.37%	6	0.11%	2,639	49.15%	5,369
Fairfax County (part)	109,595	75.16%	35,935	24.64%	281	0.19%	73,660	50.52%	145,811
Totals	113,596	75.14%	37,297	24.67%	287	0.19%	76,299	50.47%	151,180

== Notes ==
Partisan clients
