= Irene Shin =

Virginia politician

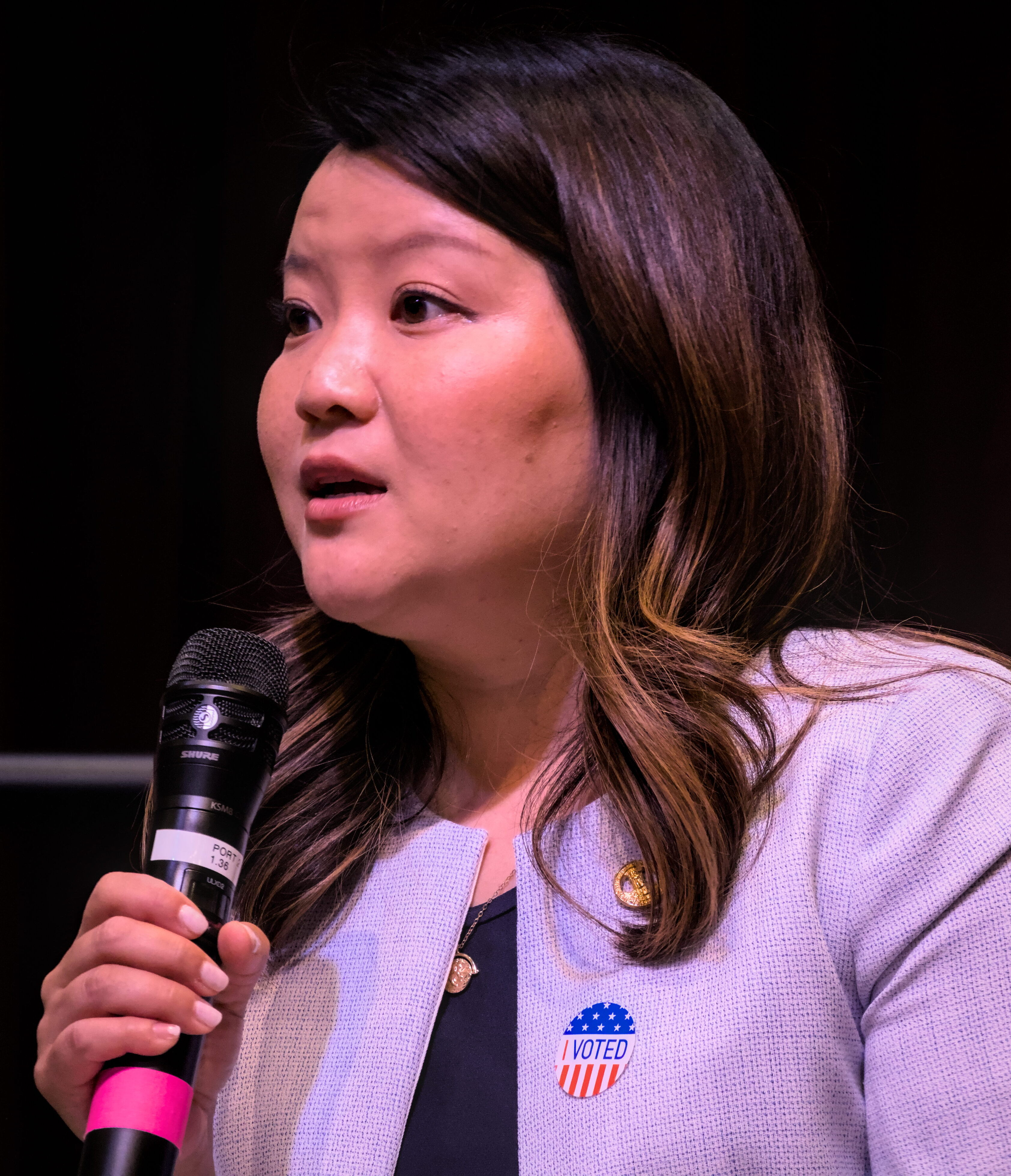
- Shin in 2025

Member of the Virginia House of Delegates
- Incumbent
- Assumed office January 12, 2022
- Preceded by: Ibraheem Samirah
- Constituency: 86th district (2022–2024); 8th district (2024–present)

Personal details
- Born: October 7, 1987 (age 38) Glendale, California, U.S.
- Party: Democratic
- Education: University of California, Riverside (BA)

Irene Shin is an American politician and former non-profit executive serving as a delegate of the Virginia House of Delegates since 2022. Shin represents the 8th district, encompassing parts of Chantilly, Herndon, Oak Hill, and Reston. A Democrat, she defeated incumbent Ibraheem Samirah in the Democratic primary in 2021. On June 3, 2025, Shin announced her candidacy for the special election in Virginia's 11th congressional district to replace deceased incumbent Gerry Connolly. However, she lost the primary, placing second behind fellow Democrat James Walkinshaw.

== Early life and education ==
The daughter of Korean immigrants, she was born in Glendale, California and raised in Greater Los Angeles. She received a Bachelor of Arts degree in political science from the University of California, Riverside in 2010.

== Career ==
Shin has worked on various Democratic political campaigns, including as finance director for then-Senator Kamala Harris. Until 2024, she was the executive director of non-profit Virginia Civic Engagement Table. Shin serves on the Tysons Transportation District Service Advisory Board for Fairfax County.

== Virginia House of Delegates ==
=== 2021 election ===
She announced a primary campaign against Delegate Ibraheem Samirah for District 86 in 2021. Despite challenging an incumbent Democrat, Shin received support from the Virginia Democratic Party establishment including multiple state legislators. She defeated Samirah in the June primary by 230 votes and out-raised him by over $100,000.

She defeated Republican Julie Perry in the general election by a margin of 65–34%.

=== Tenure ===
On June 3, 2025, Shin announced her candidacy for the special election in Virginia's 11th congressional district to replace deceased incumbent Gerry Connolly. U.S. senator Andy Kim from New Jersey endorsed her and was featured in her opening campaign video. She finished second in the firehouse primary on June 28 with 14.3% of the vote, losing to James Walkinshaw.

== Personal life ==
She moved to Virginia in 2014 and lives in Herndon. She identifies as Buddhist.

== Electoral history ==
=== 2021 ===
Virginia's 86th House of Delegates district Democratic primary, 2021
Party	Candidate	Votes	%
Democratic	Irene Shin	3,415	51.7
Democratic	Ibraheem Samirah (incumbent)	3,185	48.3
Total votes		6,600	100.0

Virginia's 86th House of Delegates district, 2021
Party	Candidate	Votes	%
Democratic	Irene Shin	19,296	65.4
Republican	Julie Perry	10,116	34.3
Write-in		90	0.3
Total votes		29,502	100.0
Democratic hold			

=== 2023 ===
Virginia's 8th House of Delegates District, 2023 general election
Party	Candidate	Votes	%
Democratic	Irene Shin (incumbent)	14,851	67.65%
Republican	Max Fisher	7,023	31.99%
Write-in		79	0.36%
Total votes		21,953	100%
Democratic hold			

=== 2025 ===
2025 Virginia 11th Congressional District Democratic primary results
Party	Candidate	Votes	%
Democratic	James Walkinshaw	22,403	59.64%
Democratic	Irene Shin	5,368	14.29%
Democratic	Stella Pekarsky	5,043	13.43%
Democratic	Amy Roma	2,697	7.18%
Democratic	Dan Lee	710	1.89%
Democratic	Leopoldo Martínez Nucete	498	1.33%
Democratic	Amy Papanu	396	1.05%
Democratic	Priya Punnoose	232	0.62%
Democratic	Candice Bennett	190	0.51%
Democratic	Ross William Branstetter IV	25	0.07%
Total votes		37,562	100.00%
