= Mount Vernon, Virginia =

- Census-designated place
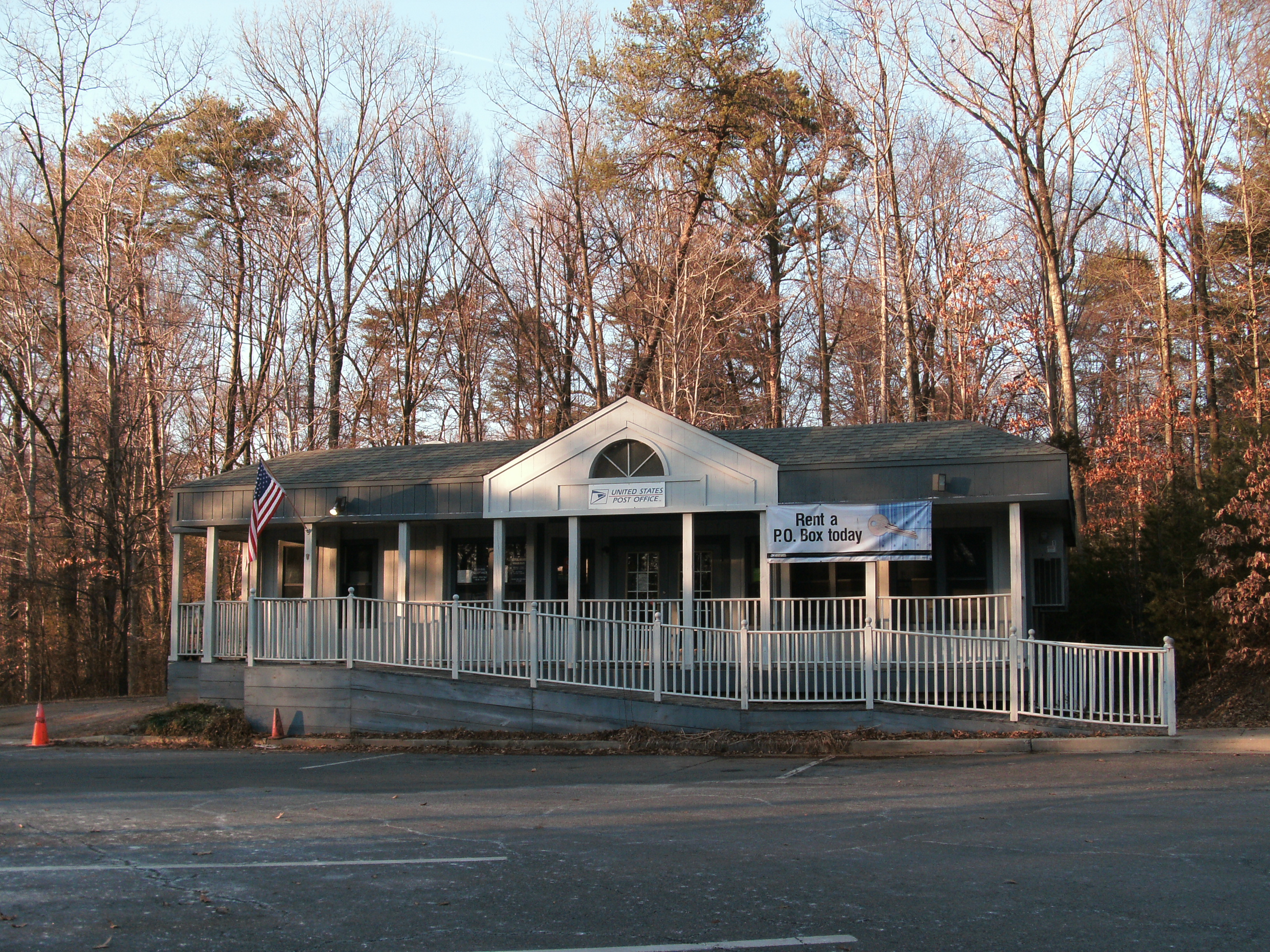
- Mount Vernon post office (2009)

- Location of Mount Vernon in Fairfax County, Virginia

- Location within Northern Virginia Location within Virginia Location within the United States
- Coordinates: 38°44′07″N 77°05′43″W
- Country: United States
- State: Virginia
- County: Fairfax
- Named for: Mount Vernon

Area
  - Total: 6.07 sq mi (15.7 km^{2})
  - Land: 5.24 sq mi (13.6 km^{2})
  - Water: 0.83 sq mi (2.1 km^{2})
- Elevation: 79 ft (24 m)

Population (2020)
  - Total: 12,914
  - Density: 2,460/sq mi (952/km^{2})
- Time zone: UTC−5 (Eastern (EST))
  - Summer (DST): UTC−4 (EDT)
- ZIP code: 22309, 22121
- Area codes: 703, 571
- FIPS code: 51-54144
- GNIS feature ID: 2391234

Mount Vernon is a census-designated place (CDP) and unincorporated community in Fairfax County, Virginia, United States. The population was 12,914 at the 2020 census. Primarily due to its historical significance and natural recreation and beauty, the Mount Vernon area receives over one million tourists each year.

While the name "Mount Vernon"—drawn from the Mount Vernon estate, the home of George Washington located south of Alexandria—is often used locally to refer to the entire unincorporated area between Old Town Alexandria and Fort Belvoir, Mount Vernon as defined by the Census Bureau encompasses only the portion bounded by the Potomac River to the south, Fort Belvoir to the west, U.S. Route 1 to the north, and Little Hunting Creek to the east.

== History ==
The Mount Vernon area is all land which was once a part of the farms of George and Martha Washington's expansive Mount Vernon estate. Much of the land was gradually donated through the dying wishes of George and Martha Washington to the public and others who are affiliated with the Washington family. The Neighboring/incorporated Woodlawn Plantation and area which was given to Martha Washington's granddaughter, Eleanor Parke Custis Lewis. The Gum Springs portion was established by slaves and blacks which were generally escaped or freed slaves from the Mount Vernon Estate and area.

Beginning with the 2010 United States census, the U.S. Census Bureau defined the portion of Mount Vernon north of U.S. Route 1 as a separate CDP, Woodlawn, reducing Mount Vernon's land area by approximately a third and its population by more than half.

== Geography ==
Mount Vernon is located at 38°44′07″N 77°05′43″W (38.7351590, −77.0953670) at an elevation of 79 feet (24 m). Located on U.S. Route 1 in Northern Virginia, Mount Vernon is 13 miles (21 km) south-southwest of downtown Washington, D.C. and 13 miles (21 km) southeast of Fairfax, the county seat.

Mount Vernon sits on the Atlantic Coastal Plain on the north side of the Potomac River. Two small tributaries of the river flow south through the CDP: Dogue Creek runs through the western part of the CDP, and Little Hunting Creek forms the CDP's eastern border.

According to the United States Census Bureau, the CDP has a total area of 6.07 square miles (15.7 km^{2}) of which 5.24 square miles (13.6 km^{2}) is land and 0.83 square miles (2.1 km^{2}) (14%) is water.

As a suburb of Washington, D.C., Mount Vernon is a part of both the Washington Metropolitan Area and the larger Baltimore-Washington Metropolitan Area. It borders other Washington suburbs on all sides, including: Woodlawn and Hybla Valley to the north, Fort Hunt to the east, Accokeek and Bryans Road, Maryland across the Potomac River to the southeast, and Fort Belvoir to the west.

== Demographics ==
Historical population
Census	Pop.	Note	%±
1980	24,058		—
1990	27,485		14.2%
2000	28,582		4.0%
2010	12,416		−56.6%
2020	12,914		4.0%
* U.S. Decennial Census

=== Racial and ethnic composition ===
Mount Vernon CDP, Virginia – Racial and ethnic composition Note: the US Census treats Hispanic/Latino as an ethnic category. This table excludes Latinos from the racial categories and assigns them to a separate category. Hispanics/Latinos may be of any race.
Race / Ethnicity (NH = Non-Hispanic)	Pop 2000	Pop 2010	Pop 2020	% 2000	% 2010	% 2020
White alone (NH)	13,861	8,016	7,605	48.50%	64.56%	58.89%
Black or African American alone (NH)	7,791	1,539	1,657	27.26%	12.40%	12.83%
Native American or Alaska Native alone (NH)	67	38	22	0.23%	0.31%	0.17%
Asian alone (NH)	1,789	818	871	6.26%	6.59%	6.74%
Native Hawaiian or Pacific Islander alone (NH)	16	7	13	0.06%	0.06%	0.10%
Other race alone (NH)	67	30	87	0.23%	0.24%	0.67%
Mixed race or Multiracial (NH)	846	298	570	2.96%	2.40%	4.41%
Hispanic or Latino (any race)	4,145	1,670	2,089	14.50%	13.45%	16.18%
Total	28,582	12,416	12,914	100.00%	100.00%	100.00%

=== 2020 census ===
As of the 2020 census, Mount Vernon had a population of 12,914. The median age was 43.5 years. 22.6% of residents were under the age of 18 and 18.3% of residents were 65 years of age or older. For every 100 females there were 94.0 males, and for every 100 females age 18 and over there were 93.2 males age 18 and over.

98.1% of residents lived in urban areas, while 1.9% lived in rural areas.

There were 4,611 households in Mount Vernon, of which 32.4% had children under the age of 18 living in them. Of all households, 63.1% were married-couple households, 12.6% were households with a male householder and no spouse or partner present, and 20.3% were households with a female householder and no spouse or partner present. About 19.5% of all households were made up of individuals and 8.8% had someone living alone who was 65 years of age or older.

There were 4,771 housing units, of which 3.4% were vacant. The homeowner vacancy rate was 0.7% and the rental vacancy rate was 4.5%.

=== 2000 census ===
As of the census of 2000, there were 28,582 people, 10,575 households, and 7,487 families residing in the CDP. The population density was 1,450.1 people/km^{2} (3,756 people/mi^{2}). There were 10,926 housing units at an average density of 1,435.7 per square mile (554.3/km^{2}). The racial makeup of the CDP was 54.42% White, 27.65% African American, 0.33% Native American, 6.33% Asian, 0.13% Pacific Islander, 6.87% from other races, and 4.26% from two or more races. Hispanic or Latino of any race were 14.50% of the population.

There were 10,575 households, out of which 34.4% had children under the age of 18 living with them, 51.0% were married couples living together, 15.0% had a female householder with no husband present, and 29.2% were non-families. 22.6% of all households were made up of individuals, and 4.4% had someone living alone who was 65 years of age or older. The average household size was 2.70 and the average family size was 3.16.

In the CDP, the population was spread out, with 26.3% under the age of 18, 7.9% from 18 to 24, 32.4% from 25 to 44, 24.4% from 45 to 64, and 9.0% who were 65 years of age or older. The median age was 36 years. For every 100 females, there were 94.3 males. For every 100 females age 18 and over, there were 90.8 males.

The median income for a household in the CDP was $61,119, and the median income for a family was $67,892. Males had a median income of $42,049 versus $33,543 for females. The per capita income for the CDP was $29,299. About 5.3% of families and 7.0% of the population were below the poverty line, including 9.7% of those under age 18 and 2.4% of those age 65 or over.

== Education ==
Mount Vernon is within Fairfax County Public Schools. Mount Vernon High School serves the community.

Previously The Islamic Saudi Academy of Washington had a campus in Mount Vernon.

== Notable locations ==
The Mount Vernon area is known for its historical and tourist sites and includes several notable locations including:

- George and Martha Washington's Mount Vernon Estate.
- The George Washington Gristmill and Distillery.
- The National Library for the Study of George Washington
- The Scenic George Washington Memorial Parkway and Trail
- Potomac docks, beaches, trails, and wildlife habitats
- The Gristmill park and Gunston Soccer Club field
- The George Washington Community Recreation Center
- Neighboring Fort Belvoir
- Neighboring Woodlawn Estate
- Neighboring Pope-Leighey House by Frank Lloyd Wright.

== Notable people ==
Mount Vernon is, most famously, the home of the first President of the United States, General of the Armies, and tobacco planter George Washington and his wife Martha Dandridge Custis Washington.

Other notable individuals who were born in and/or have lived in Mount Vernon include:

- George Allen, 67th governor of Virginia, U.S. senator from Virginia
- Kristen J. Amundson, Virginia state legislator
- Charles B. Brownson, U.S. representative from Indiana
- Herbert Harris, U.S. representative from Virginia
- Oney Judge, escaped slave
- Thomas Posey, second governor of Indiana Territory, U.S. senator from Louisiana
- Toddy Puller, Virginia state legislator
- Chuck Robb, 64th governor of Virginia, U.S. senator from Virginia
