= Stella Pekarsky =

American politician from Virginia

Member of the Virginia Senate from the 36th district
- Incumbent
- Assumed office January 10, 2024
- Preceded by: Scott Surovell (redistricted)

Personal details
- Born: April 23, 1979 (age 47)
- Party: Democratic
- Spouse: Pavel Pekarsky
- Education: George Mason University (BA, MEd)

Stella G. Pekarsky (born April 23, 1979) is an American politician. A Democrat, she has represented the 36th district in the Virginia Senate since 2024. She previously was a member of the Fairfax County School Board.

== Early life and education ==
Pekarsky was born on April 23, 1979. She graduated from George Mason University with a Bachelor of Arts in government and politics and a Masters of Education.

== Career ==
Pekarsky served as a member of the Fairfax County Public Schools board.

=== Virginia State Senate ===
==== 2023 election ====
Pekarsky announced her candidacy in 2023 against Democrat George Barker, who had previously represented the 39th district, which, because of redistricting, now covered the newly made 36th district. On June 21, Pekarsky pulled an upset victory defeating the sitting State Senator in a 52%-47% victory.

In the general election, she faced Julie Perry, a high school teacher at Centreville High School. On November 7, Pekarsky defeated Perry in a 60%-38% victory.

=== 2026 congressional campaign ===
On May 7, 2025, Pekarsky announced that she would run for the U.S. House of Representatives in Virginia's 11th congressional district, seeking to succeed the retiring incumbent, Gerry Connolly. Connolly later died on May 21, 2025. Pekarsky subsequently announced her candidacy for the special election to fill the seat, finishing third in the June 28 firehouse primary, receiving 13.4% of the vote.

== Electoral history ==
Election to the Fairfax County School Board - Sully District, 2019
Party	Candidate	Votes	%
Democratic	Stella Pekarsky	20,355	58.45
Republican	Thomas Wilson	14,383	41.30

Democratic Primary for the 36th Senate District, 2023
Party	Candidate	Votes	%
Democratic	Stella Pekarsky	8,083	52.47
Democratic	George Barker	7,322	47.53

Election to the Virginia State Senate 36th District, 2023
Party	Candidate	Votes	%
Democratic	Stella Pekarsky	36,802	60.85
Republican	Julie Perry	23,458	38.78

2025 Virginia 11th Congressional District Democratic primary results
Party	Candidate	Votes	%
Democratic	James Walkinshaw	22,403	59.64%
Democratic	Irene Shin	5,368	14.29%
Democratic	Stella Pekarsky	5,043	13.43%
Democratic	Amy Roma	2,697	7.18%
Democratic	Dan Lee	710	1.89%
Democratic	Leopoldo Martínez Nucete	498	1.33%
Democratic	Amy Papanu	396	1.05%
Democratic	Priya Punnoose	232	0.62%
Democratic	Candice Bennett	190	0.51%
Democratic	Ross William Branstetter IV	25	0.07%
Total votes		37,562	100.00%

== Personal life ==
Pekarsky is a practicing Greek Orthodox Christian and married to Pavel Pekarsky.
