= Tito the Builder =

Virginia politician

Tito Muñoz, also known by the moniker "Tito the Builder", is a conservative activist who has received substantial media attention for various political campaign activities. During the 2008 United States presidential election, Muñoz became notable for publicly defending Joe Wurzelbacher, and also for campaigning with Sarah Palin. Muñoz is a member of the Virginia state Board of Housing and Community Development, and has a conservative Latino radio show.

== Personal life ==
Muñoz, a Colombian immigrant, is presently a small construction company owner and a United States citizen. He is a resident of Woodbridge, Virginia. Muñoz claims to have 250 cousins.

Muñoz hosts "America Eres Tu", an hour-long Spanish language radio show that is broadcast on Saturday afternoons. On his radio show, Muñoz covers social issues and takes the time to explain conservative fiscal issues. Many Hispanics don't know "we owe money to other countries," Muñoz says, "they don't understand we have a deficit, they don't understand the magnitude of the debt, so I'm there trying to explain it in simple Spanish."

== Campaigns ==
Muñoz created a 527 organization called the Conservative Hispanic Coalition. Muñoz also supports Americans for Prosperity and FreedomWorks. In 2010, Muñoz considered challenging Corey Stewart, the Chairman of the Prince William Board of County Supervisors, in the Republican primary. Muñoz campaigned for Governor Bob McDonnell in the Virginia gubernatorial election, 2009.

=== 2008 presidential campaign ===
During the 2008 presidential campaign, Tito Muñoz received substantial media attention. He became known for wearing a yellow hard hat with a McCain-Palin bumper sticker, an orange reflective jacket, as well as sunglasses. He campaigned with Sarah Palin, and was known for a confrontation with reporters. Will Rabbe, of the Independent Film Channel, has posted a video about Muñoz and his interaction with reporters. Five days before the election, Muñoz appeared on Fox News' Hannity & Colmes, accusing the media of "hiding the truth about" Obama.

During this time, Muñoz coined the phrase: "Born in Colombia, Made in the U.S.A."

=== 2011 Virginia General Assembly campaign ===
In April 2011, Muñoz, who identifies as a Tea Party activist, formed his own Political Action Committee called TitoPAC. Muñoz ran for the Virginia General Assembly seat held by State Senator Toddy Puller. In May 2011, Muñoz protested a plan for Virginia state Republicans to nominate a candidate for the 36th district race. Under this plan, one GOP representative from each of the three counties will decide "whether to call a primary, convention, firehouse primary, or mass meeting to select a nominee for the Senate seat." The Washington Post reported that, after "making a passionate plea in front of Northern Virginia Republicans, potential state Senate candidate Tito Muñoz got what he wanted — a primary, not a convention, to select the Republican nominee for the 36th district Senate race. Three GOP representatives, one each from Stafford, Prince William and Fairfax counties, voted Saturday to hold an Aug. 23 primary to find a challenger for Democratic Sen. Linda "Toddy" Puller, who has held the seat since 1999."" Jeff Frederick, former chairman of the Republican Party of Virginia, filed paperwork to run for state Senate in the district. Muñoz stated that he wanted to focus on "the depleted Route 1 corridor and education." Muñoz was endorsed by former governor George Allen. On June 16, Muñoz officially launched his campaign for state senator, in Muñoz's first run for public office. "The district has a voting-age Hispanic population of 19.5 percent." If elected, Munoz would have been the first foreign-born Hispanic to serve in Virginia's state legislature.

In the August primary, Muñoz was defeated by Frederick, losing by a 76.8% to 23.19% margin. Puller won the general election.
