= Lewis Burwell Puller Jr. =

US Marine Corps and Attorney (1945-1994)

- Puller in the 1980s
- Born: August 18, 1945; Camp Lejeune, North Carolina, US
- Died: May 11, 1994 (aged 48); Mount Vernon, Virginia, US
- Burial place: Arlington National Cemetery
- Spouse: Toddy Puller
- Relatives: Chesty Puller (father) William H. Dabney (brother-in-law)
- Military career
- Other work: Author, Attorney; B.A. College of William and Mary J.D. Marshall-Wythe Law School College of William and Mary
- Military career
- Allegiance: United States
- Branch: United States Marine Corps
- Service years: 1967–1968
- Rank: First lieutenant
- Conflicts: Vietnam War
- Awards: Silver Star; Purple Heart (2); Navy and Marine Corps Commendation Medal w/ "V" Device; Vietnam Cross of Gallantry

Lewis Burwell Puller Jr. (August 18, 1945 – May 11, 1994) was an attorney and a United States Marine Corps officer who was severely wounded in the Vietnam War. He won the 1992 Pulitzer Prize for Biography or Autobiography for his autobiography Fortunate Son.

== Life and career ==
Lewis Burwell Puller Jr. was the son of Lt. General Lewis "Chesty" Puller, the most decorated Marine in the history of the U.S. Marine Corps. He followed in his father's footsteps and became a Marine officer.

Puller graduated from the Christchurch School, in Christchurch, Virginia, in 1963 and from the College of William and Mary in 1967. After his graduation from Officer Candidate School, he received orders to South Vietnam in July 1968, where he served as an Infantry Platoon Leader for three months in 1st Marine Division. On October 11, 1968, his rifle jammed during an engagement with North Vietnamese troops; Puller was wounded when he tripped a booby-trapped howitzer round, losing his right leg at the hip, his left leg to above the knee, his left hand and most of his fingers on his right hand in the explosion.

The shell riddled his body with shrapnel, and he lingered near death for days with his weight dropping to 55 pounds, but he survived. Puller later recalled the first time his father saw him in the hospital. He described how his father broke down weeping and that hurt him more than any of his physical injuries. Those who knew him say that it was primarily because of his iron will and his stubborn refusal to die that he survived. He was medically discharged from the Marine Corps. He was awarded the Silver Star Medal, the Navy and Marine Corps Commendation Medal, two Purple Heart Medals, and the Republic of Vietnam Gallantry Cross for his service in the Marine Corps.

For years after he returned to a reasonably sound physical condition, he remained emotionally shaken, though he earned a Juris Doctor degree, had two children with the woman he had married before going to Vietnam, and raised a family. He was admitted to the Virginia Bar in 1974 and began working as a lawyer for the Veteran's Administration and on President Gerald Ford's clemency board. He mounted a campaign for Congress in 1978 as a Democrat in Virginia but lost in a landslide with only 28% of the vote against incumbent Republican Congressman Paul Trible. Throughout the years, he battled periods of despondency and drank heavily until 1981, when he underwent treatment for alcoholism. Despite that treatment, Puller continued to suffer severe depression and occasional bouts of alcoholism.

External videos
- Booknotes interview with Puller on Fortunate Son, May 24, 1991, C-SPAN

Puller told the story of his ordeal and its aftermath in his 1991 autobiography, Fortunate Son: The Autobiography of Lewis B. Puller Jr., published by Grove Press. The account ended with Puller triumphing over his physical disabilities and becoming emotionally at peace with himself. The following year he won the 1992 Pulitzer Prize for Biography or Autobiography. The title of this autobiography was borrowed from the song "Fortunate Son" by Creedence Clearwater Revival, to which he gives credit in the opening pages.

According to friends and associates, Puller spent the last months of his life in turmoil. He left his job as a lawyer at the Pentagon to accept a teaching position at George Mason University. In the days leading up to his death, Puller fought a losing battle with the alcoholism that he had kept at bay for 13 years, and struggled with a more recent addiction, to painkillers initially prescribed to dull continuing pain from his wounds.

== Death and aftermath ==
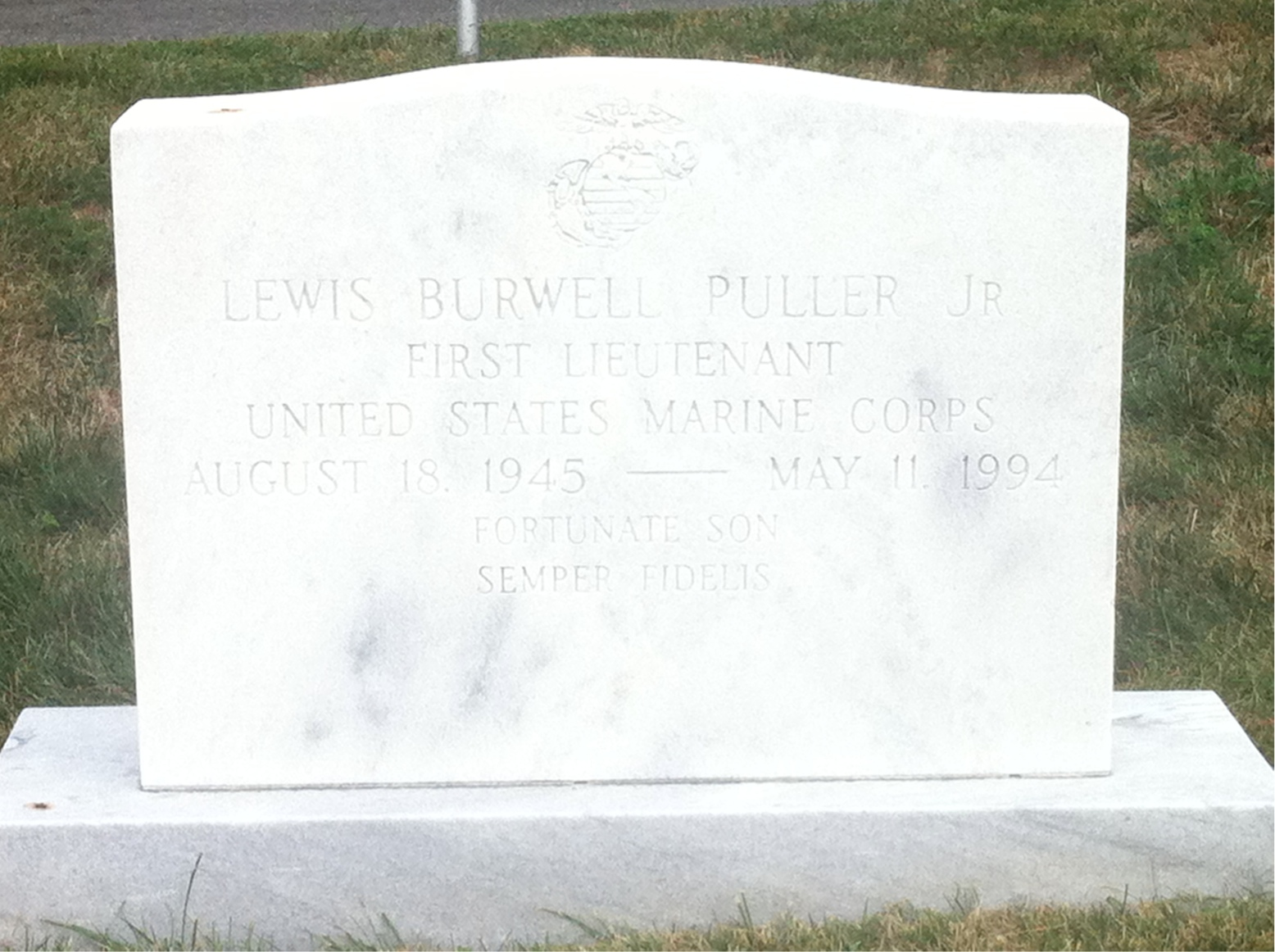
Grave at Arlington National Cemetery

Puller died from a self-inflicted gunshot on May 11, 1994. He was survived by his wife, Linda T. "Toddy" Puller, from whom he had separated in 1991; his two children, Lewis III and Maggie; his twin sister, Martha Downs; and sister, Virginia Dabney.

Puller's name is not listed on the Vietnam Veterans Memorial, which is reserved for those who died or who are listed as missing in action. However, his name is listed on the nearby In Memory Memorial Plaque, which represents those veterans, like Puller, who "died after their service in the Vietnam war, but as a direct result of that service, and whose names are not otherwise eligible for placement on the memorial wall."

Terry Anderson, a former Associated Press journalist, who was held hostage in Lebanon, recalled the same hope he had had for his friend, Puller. "This is a man who had so many burdens, so many things to bear. And he bore them well for 25 years," he said. "What did I miss?" Anderson asked. "I was his friend. I thought he was winning".

Kiều Chinh, an actress who was a refugee after the fall of Saigon and who worked with Puller on his last project, an effort to build a school in Quảng Trị, said: "Lewis Puller never stop fighting the war of healing... to heal not only his own wounds but the common wounds of the two nations."

In a statement, Puller's wife, Toddy said, "Our family has been moved and humbled by the outpouring of affection for Lewis. The many acts of kindness from our friends across the country have helped us in this very difficult time. It is clear that Lewis affected the lives of people in ways that we never knew." Of her deceased husband, she said, "To the list of names of victims of the Vietnam War, add the name of Lewis Puller ... He suffered terrible wounds that never really healed". In 1991, she was elected to the Virginia House of Delegates.

On Veterans Day 2010, the Lewis B. Puller Jr. Veterans Benefits Clinic at The College of William & Mary Law School was named in honor of Puller.

== Awards ==
During his military career, Puller earned the following:

1st Row	Silver Star		
2nd Row	Purple Heart with 1 5/16 gold inch star (2 awards)	Navy Commendation Medal with "V" device	Combat Action Ribbon
3rd Row	National Defense Service Medal	Vietnam Service Medal with 2 Campaign stars	Vietnam Gallantry Cross with bronze star
4th Row	Vietnam Gallantry Cross Unit Citation with palm and frame	Vietnam Civil Actions Medal Unit Citation with palm and frame	Vietnam Campaign Medal with "60-" clasp

=== Silver Star citation ===
Citation:

The President of the United States of America takes pleasure in presenting the Silver Star to Second Lieutenant Lewis Burwell Puller, Jr. (MCSN: 0-105622), United States Marine Corps, for conspicuous gallantry and intrepidity in action while serving as a Platoon Commander with Company G, Second Battalion, First Marines, FIRST Marine Division (Rein.), FMF, in connection with combat operations against insurgent communist (Viet Cong) forces in the Republic of Vietnam. On the morning of 11 October 1968, elements of Company G were helicopter lifted into an area near Viem Dong in Quang Nam Province in order to establish a blocking position for a search and destroy operation inside the village. Upon being inserted into the designated area, Second Lieutenant Puller expeditiously reorganized and deployed his men into advantageous positions. Then, completely disregarding the danger of being ambushed by enemy forces, he boldly led elements of his platoon across hazardous terrain in order to quickly establish contact with the company commander and coordinate his efforts with the remainder of the company. As he neared the command group, he inadvertently detonated a large enemy mine and fell seriously wounded. Ignoring the intense pain of his injuries as he received medical treatment, he calmly and effectively continued to direct the efforts of his unit. Directing another Marine to assume command, Second Lieutenant Puller gave him detailed instructions to ensure that he continued the assigned mission. Sincerely concerned for the welfare of his comrades, he remained alert and spoke words of encouragement to his litter bearers while being carried to the landing zone where he was medically evacuated. His resolute determination and composure under extremely hazardous conditions inspired all who observed him and contributed materially to his unit's ability to continue its mission. By his courage, aggressive leadership and unfaltering devotion to duty, Second Lieutenant Puller upheld the highest traditions of the Marine Corps and of the United States Naval Service.
