= José Nucete Sardi =

Venezuelan historian, journalist and diplomat (1897–1972)

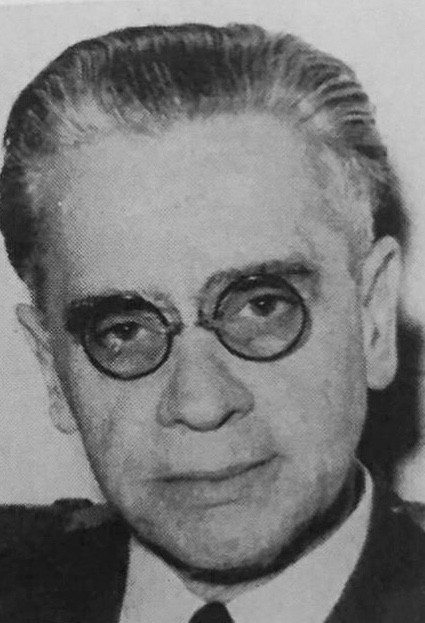
- Born: August 4, 1897; Mérida, Mérida, Venezuela
- Died: November 12, 1972 (aged 75); Caracas, Venezuela
- Education: University of the Andes; University of Geneva; Free University of Brussels; Columbia University
- Occupations: Historian; journalist; diplomat
- Spouse: Julia Salas Ruiz
- Children: 4

José Nucete Sardi (August 4, 1897, Mérida – November 12, 1972, Caracas) was a Venezuelan historian, journalist and diplomat.

== Education ==
He attended high school and college in the city of Mérida at the Universidad de Los Andes (ULA), graduating with a Philosophy and Arts specialty in 1914. Later he studied at the Universities of Geneva (Switzerland) and Brussels (Belgium) and attended free courses at Columbia University (USA) where he also taught Latin American literature.

== Journalism career ==
Nucete Sardi was editor of the newspaper El Universal between 1922 and 1936. He was also director of El Relator in 1927 and director of the National Culture Magazine from 1940 to 1944, and the political-literary weekly magazine - Diagonal.

== Political and diplomatic career ==
Nucete Sardi's career includes:

- Director of the National Press Office (1936–1937)
- Secretary of the Venezuelan Delegation to the League of Nations (1937–1938)
- Inspector General of Consulates (1937–1938)
- First secretary of the Venezuelan delegation in Germany, Czechoslovakia, Poland, and Romania (1938–1940)
- Director of Culture and Fine Arts of the Ministry of Education (1940–1944)
- Ambassador of Venezuela to the Soviet Union (1946)
- Ambassador to Argentina (1958–59)
- Two-time ambassador to Cuba (1947 to 1952) and 1959-1961)
- Companion Ambassador to the Quintero Cardinal, Archbishop of Caracas responsible for the inauguration of its Cardenalicia headquarters (1961)
- Governor of the State of Mérida (1964–1966)
- Ambassador to Belgium and Luxembourg (1966–1967)

== Publications ==
- Aspecto del Movimiento Federal Venezolano - (Aspects of the Venezuelan Federal Movement),
- Aventura y Tragedia de Don Francisco de Miranda - (Adventure and Tragedy of Don Francisco de Miranda),
- La casa natal del Libertador - Birthplace of the Liberator),
- Cecilio Acosta y José Martí - (Cecilio Acosta y José Marti),
- Binomio de Espíritus - (Binomial of Spirits),
- La Ciudad y sus Tiempos - (The City and its time),
- Cuadernos de Indagación e Impolíticas - (Journal of inquiry and impolitics),
- La Defensa de Caín - (the Defense of Cain),
- El Escritor y Civilizador Simón Bolívar - (The Writer and Civilizer Simón Bolívar),
- EL Hombre de Allá Lejos -(The Man from afar),
- Huellas en América - (Footprints in America),
- Navidades del Libertador - (Liberator's Christmas),
- Nieves, Gente y Brumas - (Snow, People and mists),
- Notas sobre la Pintura y la Escultura en Venezuela - (Notes on Painting and Sculpture in Venezuela).

He translated the 5th volume of the Ministry of Education's 1942 edition of Viaje a las regiones equinocciales del Nuevo Continente(Travel to the Equinoctial Regions of the New Continent), by Alexander von Humboldt into Castilian. He also translated El Bosquejo de Caracas (The Outline of Caracas) by Robert Semple (1964) and several original texts on the Miranda expedition of 1806.

He was also the author of biographies of heroes in the Venezuelan Jackson Encyclopedia (Buenos Aires, 1956) and in the Biographical Dictionary of Venezuela, edited by Garrido, Mosque and Co. (1953).

== See also ==
- Leopoldo Martínez Nucete (grandson)
