= 2020 Hawaii Democratic presidential primary =

- May 22, 2020

33 delegates (24 pledged, 9 unpledged) to the Democratic National Convention The number of pledged delegates won is determined by the popular vote

Candidate	Joe Biden	Bernie Sanders (withdrawn)
Home state	Delaware	Vermont
Delegate count	16	8
First round	19,593 (55.9%)	10,777 (30.8%)
Final round	21,215 (60.54%)	12,337 (35.20%)
- Election results by county Joe Biden

Pledged national convention delegates
Type	Del.
CD1	7
CD2	8
PLEO	3
At-large	6
Total pledged delegates	24

The 2020 Hawaii Democratic presidential primary had been scheduled to take place on April 4, 2020, a Saturday, in the Democratic Party primaries for the 2020 presidential election, but in-person voting was cancelled due to the COVID-19 pandemic and mail-in voting was extended to May 22, 2020. Instead, voters had until May 22 to submit mail-in ballots. The Hawaii primary was a closed party-run primary, awarding 33 delegates to the 2020 Democratic National Convention, of which 24 were pledged delegates allocated on the basis of the results of the primary. Voters cast ranked-choice voting ballots, with a voter's ballot counting for two ranked backup choices if their original choice was in last place and below the 15 percent threshold for winning delegates.

Former vice president and presumptive nominee Joe Biden won the primary, taking around 61% of the vote and 16 delegates after the distribution of preferences compared to senator Bernie Sanders' 35% and 8 delegates. On the count of first choices, Biden and Sanders had taken approximately 56% and 31% of the vote, while 13% were spread between eight other candidates who had withdrawn from the race, notably senator Elizabeth Warren with 5% and representative Tulsi Gabbard with 4%. On the final count a rather large amount of 4% of the votes were inactive, as they did not include a choice for one of the two candidates that had overcome the 15 percent hurdle.

== Procedure ==
Hawaii had been scheduled to hold its primary on April 4, 2020, along with the Alaska and Louisiana primaries and Wyoming caucuses on the same day, but because of the COVID-19 pandemic the state party decided on March 27, 2020, that all voting had to occur by mail instead and that ballots received by May 22 would be counted. The Hawaii Democratic Party's draft delegate selection plan published on March 25, 2019, had called for a shift away from caucuses as in previous years to a party-run primary, also known as a firehouse primary or officially a "presidential preference poll", with a limited ranked-choice voting system allowing voters to select their top three choices. Mail-in ballots would have been accepted from March 3 to March 28, 2020.

Voting with paper ballots originally was to take place throughout the state from 7:00 a.m. until 3:00 p.m on a Saturday. Candidates had to meet a threshold of 15 percent at the congressional district or statewide level in order to be considered viable. The 22 pledged delegates to the 2020 Democratic National Convention were allocated proportionally on the basis of the results of the primary. Of these, 7 and 8 were allocated to the two congressional districts, respectively, and another 3 were allocated to party leaders and elected officials (PLEO delegates), in addition to 6 at-large delegates. Originally planned with 22 delegates, the final number included a 10% bonus of 2 additional delegates on the 14 district and 5 at-large delegates by the Democratic National Committee due to the original April date, which belonged to Stage II on the primary timetable.

Before the primary, precinct meetings were held on March 4, 2020, to choose delegates for the state convention. As the state convention, planned for May 23 to May 24, was postponed until September, the state convention delegates voted on national convention district delegates online on June 8, while the state central committee voted on the at-large and pledged PLEO delegates online on June 13. The delegation also included 9 unpledged PLEO delegates: 4 members of the Democratic National Committee, 4 members of Congress (both senators and all two representatives), and the governor David Ige.

== Candidates ==
The following individuals appeared on the ballot in Hawaii:

Running

- Joe Biden

Withdrawn

- Michael Bloomberg
- Pete Buttigieg
- Tulsi Gabbard
- Amy Klobuchar
- Deval Patrick
- Bernie Sanders
- Tom Steyer
- Elizabeth Warren
- Andrew Yang

Michael Bennet, John Delaney and Kamala Harris also qualified but withdrew early enough to be taken off the ballot. There was also an uncommitted option.

== Results ==
The primary was conducted by ranked-choice voting. Voters were instructed to mark their top three choices on paper ballots. Any voter with a first choice other than Biden or Sanders had their ballot count in the final round if ranking one of those candidates as a second or third choice.

2020 Hawaii Democratic presidential primary
Candidate	Votes	%	Delegates
Joe Biden	21,215	60.54	16
Bernie Sanders (withdrawn)	12,337	35.20	8
Void Votes	68	0.19	
Inactive votes (Note: Votes which had all its 3 ranked vote-choices allocated towards eliminated candidates who did not reach the threshold of 15%.)	1,424	4.06	
Total	35,044	100%	24

=== Vote count by round ===
The ballots were counted separately in each of Hawaii's two Congressional districts.

Vote count by round
Candidate	District	Round 1		Round 2		Round 3		Round 4		Round 5		Round 6		Round 7		Round 8		Round 9		Round 10	
Candidate	District	Votes	%	Votes	%	Votes	%	Votes	%	Votes	%	Votes	%	Votes	%	Votes	%	Votes	%	Votes	%
Joe Biden	HI-1	8,585	58.90	8,586	58.90	8,588	58.90	8,601	59.00	8,612	59.40	8,686	60.00	8,729	60.40	8,885	61.80	8,991	63.50	9,315	66.40
Joe Biden	HI-2	11,008	54.00	11,010	54.00	11,015	54.00	11,028	54.10	11,058	54.30	11,137	54.80	11,150	55.30	11,247	55.90	11,459	58.20	11,900	61.00
Bernie Sanders (withdrawn)	HI-1	4,054	27.80	4,055	27.80	4,057	27.80	4,061	27.90	4,066	28.00	4,086	28.20	4,141	28.70	4,174	29.00	4,322	30.50	4,716	33.60
Bernie Sanders (withdrawn)	HI-2	6,723	33.00	6,724	33.00	6,729	33.00	6,730	33.00	6,773	33.20	6,798	33.40	6,808	33.70	6,837	34.00	7,138	36.20	7,621	39.00
Elizabeth Warren (withdrawn)	HI-1	738	5.06	738	5.06	740	5.08	746	5.12	747	5.15	769	5.31	813	5.63	832	5.79	853	6.02	Eliminated	
Elizabeth Warren (withdrawn)	HI-2	951	4.66	952	4.67	955	4.68	974	4.78	997	4.89	1,024	5.03	1,028	5.09	1,040	5.17	1,098	5.58	Eliminated	
Tulsi Gabbard (withdrawn)	HI-1	446	3.06	446	3.06	446	3.06	447	3.07	449	3.10	456	3.15	475	3.29	485	3.37	Eliminated			
Tulsi Gabbard (withdrawn)	HI-2	931	4.57	931	4.57	931	4.57	937	4.60	962	4.72	971	4.77	973	4.82	990	4.92	Eliminated			
Michael Bloomberg (withdrawn)	HI-1	262	1.80	262	1.80	266	1.82	267	1.83	270	1.86	278	1.92	286	1.98	Eliminated					
Michael Bloomberg (withdrawn)	HI-2	198	0.97	198	0.97	201	0.99	203	1.00	205	1.01	217	1.07	219	1.09	Eliminated					
Andrew Yang (withdrawn)	HI-1	186	1.28	187	1.28	191	1.31	192	1.32	193	1.33	206	1.42	Eliminated							
Andrew Yang (withdrawn)	HI-2	154	0.76	155	0.76	155	0.76	159	0.78	Eliminated											
Pete Buttigieg (withdrawn)	HI-1	153	1.05	153	1.05	153	1.05	159	1.09	159	1.10	Eliminated									
Pete Buttigieg (withdrawn)	HI-2	158	0.77	159	0.78	159	0.78	170	0.83	186	0.91	Eliminated									
Uncommitted	HI-1	106	0.73	106	0.73	106	0.73	106	0.73	Eliminated											
Uncommitted	HI-2	185	0.91	185	0.91	186	0.91	186	0.91	191	0.94	192	0.94	Eliminated							
Amy Klobuchar (withdrawn)	HI-1	34	0.23	34	0.23	34	0.23	Eliminated													
Amy Klobuchar (withdrawn)	HI-2	59	0.29	60	0.29	61	0.30	Eliminated													
Tom Steyer (withdrawn)	HI-1	15	0.10	15	0.10	Eliminated															
Tom Steyer (withdrawn)	HI-2	19	0.09	19	0.09	Eliminated															
Deval Patrick (withdrawn)	HI-1	4	0.03	Eliminated																	
Deval Patrick (withdrawn)	HI-2	7	0.03	Eliminated																	
Total		34,976 (Note: The number of void votes is not included in the vote count by round.)	100%	34,975	c. 100%	34,973	c. 100%	34,966	99.97%	34,868	99.7%	34,820	99.6%	34,622	99.0%	34,520	98.7%	33,861	96.8%	33,552	95.9%
