= Virginia's 36th Senate district =

American legislative district

Virginia's 36th State Senate district
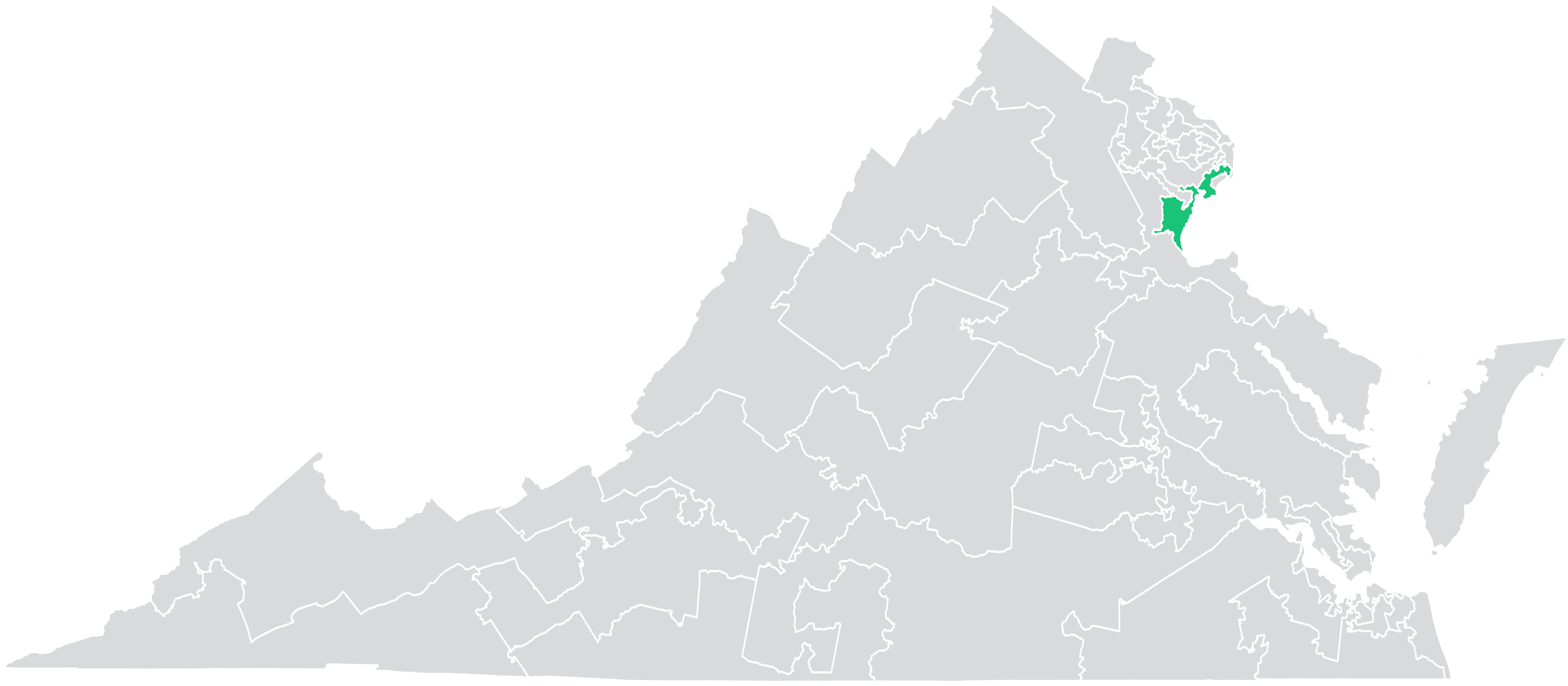
Senator
Stella Pekarsky; D–Centreville
- Demographics: 48% White; 7% Black; 12% Hispanic; 30% Asian; 4% Other
- Population (2019): 223,093
- Registered voters: 134,492

Virginia's 36th Senate district is one of 40 districts in the Senate of Virginia. It has been represented by Democrat Stella Pekarsky since 2023.

== History ==
- Stella Pekarsky since 2023, succeeding fellow Democrat Scott Surovell.

== Geography ==
District 36 covers parts of Fairfax County.

The district overlaps with Virginia's 10th and 11th congressional districts, and with the 8th, 9th, 10th, and 11th districts of the Virginia House of Delegates.

== Recent election results ==
=== 2023 ===
2023 Virginia Senate election, District 36
Party	Candidate	Votes	%
Democratic	Stella Pekarsky	36,802	60.8
Republican	Julie Perry	23,458	38.8
Write-in		223	0.4
Total votes		60,483	100
Democratic hold			

=== 2019 ===
2019 Virginia Senate election, District 36
Party	Candidate	Votes	%
Democratic	Scott Surovell (incumbent)	37,518	95.9
Write-in		3,398	4.1
Total votes		39,141	100
Democratic hold			

=== 2015 ===
County and independent city results Surovell: 50–60%; 60–70%; Foreman: 50–60%

2015 Virginia Senate election, District 36
Party	Candidate	Votes	%
Democratic	Scott Surovell	18,320	60.5
Republican	Gerald Foreman	11,890	39.3
Write-in		62	0.2
Total votes		30,272	100
Democratic hold			

=== 2011 ===
County and independent city results Puller: 60–70%; Frederick: 50–60%

2011 Virginia Senate election, District 36
Primary election
Party	Candidate	Votes	%
Republican	Jeff Frederick	3,670	68.6
Republican	Tito Muñoz	1,676	31.3
Total votes		5,347	100
General election
Democratic	Toddy Puller (incumbent)	16,649	55.2
Republican	Jeff Frederick	13,445	44.6
Total votes		30,161	100
Democratic hold			

=== Federal & Statewide results in District 36 ===
Year	Office	Results
2020	President	Biden 70.6 – 27.6%
2017	Governor	Northam 68.7 – 30.4%
2016	President	Clinton 65.9 – 29.3%
2014	Senate	Warner 59.4 – 38.8%
2013	Governor	McAuliffe 60.9 – 34.9%
2012	President	Obama 64.7 – 34.2%
2012	Senate	Kaine 65.2 – 34.8%

== Historical results ==
All election results below took place prior to 2011 redistricting, and thus were under different district lines.

=== 2007 ===
2007 Virginia Senate election, District 36
Party	Candidate	Votes	%
Democratic	Toddy Puller (incumbent)	21,441	96.3
Total votes		22,255	100
Democratic hold			

=== 2003 ===
2003 Virginia Senate election, District 36
Party	Candidate	Votes	%
Democratic	Toddy Puller (incumbent)	16,637	55.4
Republican	Chris Braunlich	13,373	44.5
Total votes		30,022	100
Democratic hold			

=== 1999 ===
1999 Virginia Senate election, District 36
Party	Candidate	Votes	%
Democratic	Toddy Puller	17,363	52.4
Republican	Daniel Rinzel	15,757	47.6
Total votes		33,136	100
Democratic hold			

=== 1995 ===
1995 Virginia Senate election, District 36
Party	Candidate	Votes	%
Democratic	Joseph V. Gartlan Jr.	18,378	52.7
Republican	Stanford Parris	16,461	47.2
Total votes		34,851	100
Democratic hold			

== District officeholders ==
Years	Senator, District 36	Counties/cities in district
1940–1944	No member elected	District was defunct as a result of redistricting
1944–1948	No member elected	District was defunct as a result of redistricting
1948–1952	No member elected	District was defunct as a result of redistricting
1952–1956	No member elected	District was defunct as a result of redistricting
1956–1960	Armistead L. Boothe (D)	City of Alexandria
1960–1963	Armistead L. Boothe (D)	City of Alexandria
1963–1964	Leroy S. Bendheim (D)	City of Alexandria
1964–1968	No member elected	District was defunct as a result of redistricting
1968–1972	No member elected	District was defunct as a result of redistricting
1972–1976	Joseph V. Gartlan, Jr. (D)	Fairfax County (part)
1976–1980	Joseph V. Gartlan, Jr. (D)	Fairfax County (part)
1980–1984	Joseph V. Gartlan, Jr. (D)	Fairfax County (part)
1984–1988	Joseph V. Gartlan, Jr. (D)	Fairfax County (part)
1988–1992	Joseph V. Gartlan, Jr. (D)	Fairfax County (part)
1992–1996	Joseph V. Gartlan, Jr. (D)	Fairfax County (part)
1996–2000	Joseph V. Gartlan, Jr. (D)	Fairfax County (part)
2000–2004	Toddy Puller (D)	Fairfax County (part)
2004–2008	Toddy Puller (D)	Fairfax County (part), Prince William County (part)
2008–2012	Toddy Puller (D)	Fairfax County (part), Prince William County (part)
2012–2016	Toddy Puller (D)	Fairfax County (part), Prince William County (part) and Stafford County (part)
2016–2023	Scott A. Surovell (D)	Fairfax County (part), Prince William County (part) and Stafford County (part)
2023-Present	Stella Pekarsky (D)	Fairfax County (part)
