= Woodlawn, Fairfax County, Virginia =

- Census-designated place
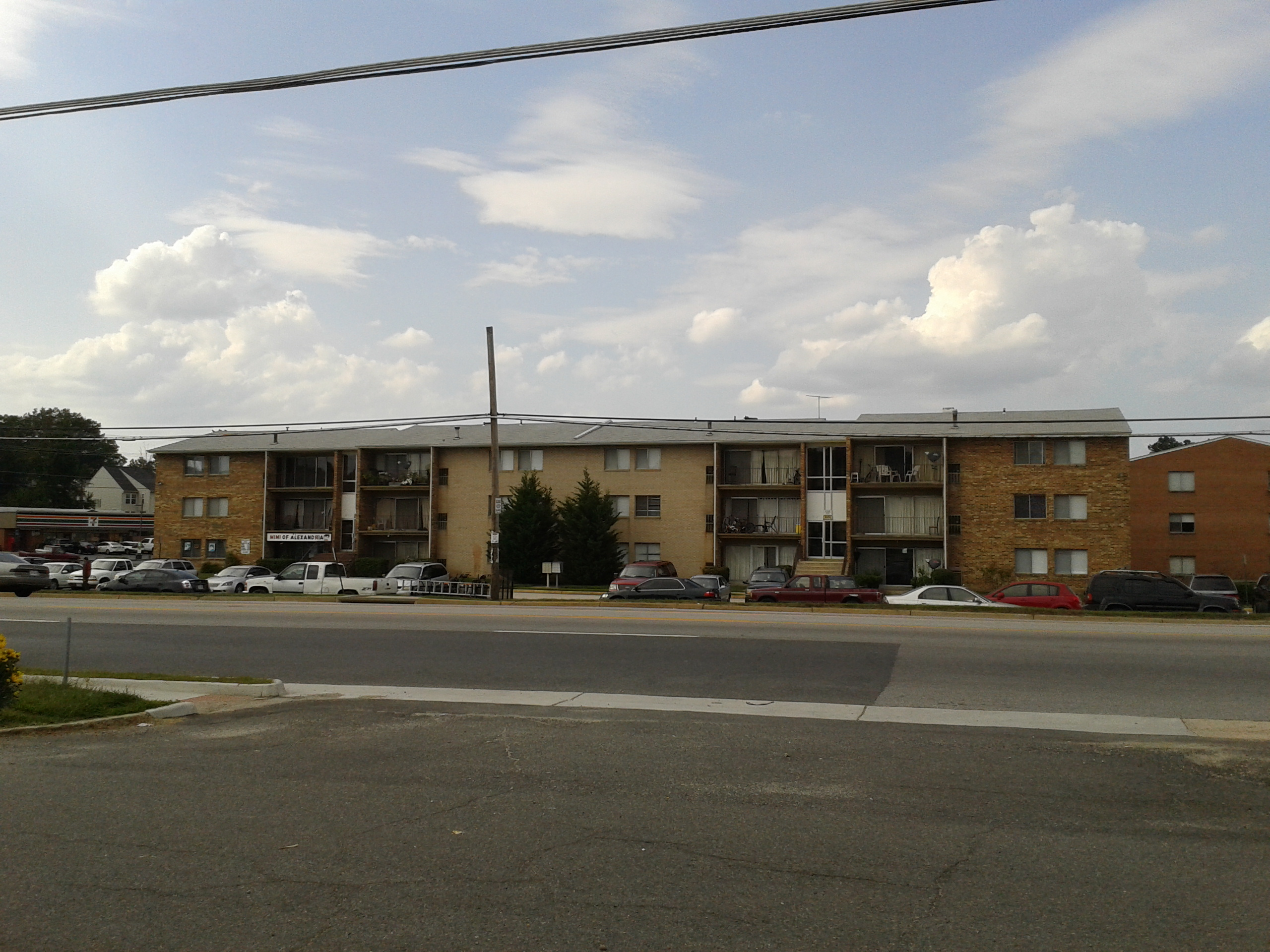
- Apartment complex in Woodlawn, typical of those found locally in the Route 1 corridor

- Location within Northern Virginia Location within Virginia Location within the United States
- Coordinates: 38°43′59″N 77°6′54″W
- Country: United States
- State: Virginia
- County: Fairfax

Area
  - Total: 2.31 sq mi (5.98 km^{2})
  - Land: 2.30 sq mi (5.95 km^{2})
  - Water: 0.012 sq mi (0.03 km^{2})
- Elevation: 30 ft (9.1 m)

Population (2020)
  - Total: 20,859
  - Density: 9,051/sq mi (3,494.8/km^{2})
- Time zone: UTC−5 (Eastern (EST))
  - Summer (DST): UTC−4 (EDT)
- ZIP code: 22309
- FIPS code: 51-87430
- GNIS feature ID: 2584939

Woodlawn is a census-designated place in Fairfax County, Virginia, United States. The population as of the 2010 census was 20,804. It was carved out of the Mount Vernon CDP beginning with the 2010 census, from the west it goes from Fort Belvoir to Little Hunting Creek stretching along U.S. Route 1 on the south and Huntley Meadows Park on the north. Historic Woodlawn Plantation occupies the southwestern corner. Fairfax County Park Authority operates neighborhood parks in the area.

== Demographics ==
Historical population
| Census | Pop. | Note | %± |
|---|---|---|---|
| 2010 | 20,804 | | — |
| 2020 | 20,859 | | 0.3% |
U.S. Decennial Census; 2010 2020

Woodlawn was first listed as a census designated place in the 2010 U.S. census formed from part of Mount Vernon CDP.

Woodlawn CDP, Virginia – Racial and ethnic composition Note: the US Census treats Hispanic/Latino as an ethnic category. This table excludes Latinos from the racial categories and assigns them to a separate category. Hispanics/Latinos may be of any race.
| Race / Ethnicity (NH = Non-Hispanic) | Pop 2010 | Pop 2020 | % 2010 | % 2020 |
|---|---|---|---|---|
| White alone (NH) | 4,101 | 3,211 | 19.71% | 15.39% |
| Black or African American alone (NH) | 6,799 | 6,338 | 32.68% | 30.38% |
| Native American or Alaska Native alone (NH) | 42 | 32 | 0.20% | 0.15% |
| Asian alone (NH) | 1,664 | 1,990 | 8.00% | 9.54% |
| Native Hawaiian or Pacific Islander alone (NH) | 19 | 22 | 0.09% | 0.11% |
| Other race alone (NH) | 62 | 108 | 0.30% | 0.52% |
| Mixed race or Multiracial (NH) | 527 | 667 | 2.53% | 3.20% |
| Hispanic or Latino (any race) | 7,590 | 8,491 | 36.48% | 40.71% |
| Total | 20,804 | 20,859 | 100.00% | 100.00% |

== Education ==
Fairfax County Public Schools operates Woodlawn and Mount Vernon Woods Elementary Schools within the area. It is in the region 3 of the FCPS region
