= Kristen J. Amundson =

American politician (born 1949)

Member of the Virginia House of Delegates from the 44th district
- In office January 12, 2000 – January 13, 2010
- Preceded by: Toddy Puller
- Succeeded by: Scott Surovell

Personal details
- Born: December 3, 1949 (age 76) Brainerd, Minnesota, U.S.
- Party: Democratic
- Children: Sara Conrath
- Education: Macalester College; American University
- Occupation: Writer
- Committees: Health, Welfare and Institutions; Rules; Science and Technology

Kristen J. "Kris" Amundson (born December 3, 1949) is an American politician and former delegate to the Virginia General Assembly. A Democrat, she was elected to the Virginia House of Delegates in November 1999. She represented the 44th district in Fairfax County. She announced that she would not seek reelection to the General Assembly in 2009, and was replaced by fellow Democrat Scott Surovell. Prior to her service in the General Assembly, Amundson was on the Fairfax County School Board. She served as the president and CEO of the National Association of State Boards of Education (NASBE) from 2013 to 2019. She is the author of two books, 81 Questions for Parents and Unfinished Learning: Parents, Schools, and COVID School Closures, both published by Rowman & Littlefield.

== Sources ==
- "Virginia House of Delegates 2009; Delegate Kristen J. Amundson". Virginia House of Delegates.
