= National Democratic Training Committee =

Organization focused on political training in the United States

- Abbreviation: NDTC
- Founded: 2017; 9 years ago
- Headquarters: Washington, D.C., U.S.
- Website: https://traindemocrats.org

The National Democratic Training Committee (NDTC) is a political action committee formed in 2016 to train American Democratic party candidates at all levels of government to run for public office.

== History ==
The NDTC was founded in 2016 by Democratic strategist Kelly Dietrich, who described the organization as a resource for candidates and local leaders involved in down-ballot races that may not receive attention from or be able to afford guidance from other political organizations. Dietrich described the NDTC's core mission as "lowering the barrier of entry for anyone who wants to get involved in Democratic politics" and building long-term Democratic power at all levels of government. In its first two years of operation, more than 10,000 Democrats signed up for NDTC training, and by 2018, Dietrich said that more than 18,000 Democrats had signed up.

In 2017, the NDTC announced plans to invest $4 million during the 2018 election cycle in an effort to get 50,000 Democrats to use its services to run for office. The investment included funding for an estimated $600,000 for in-person training sessions.

=== Program expansion and staff training launch (2018-2019) ===
In 2018, the organization launched the first online training platform for NGP VAN's "VoteBuilder," the voter database used by the Democratic Party, to help candidates and their campaigns identify and reach voters. That year, the NDTC trained 679 candidates during the election cycle, 511 of whom won their primaries; 275 of the nominees were women. NDTC held more than 50 in-person training sessions across all 50 states, including a training in Idaho that drew 200 attendees and a day-long event in rural Alabama that attracted hundreds.

According to its FEC report, the NDTC raised $7.35 million during the 2018 election cycle. During the week of Brett Kavanaugh's Senate confirmation hearing, the NDTC raised $240,000, its best seven-day fundraising period since launching in 2016, with a record $40,000 received the day before the Kavanaugh vote.

The NDTC launched its Staff Academy program in 2019 to provide training for Democratic campaign staff for the 2020 election cycle. The NDTC trained a group of 60 new Democratic campaign staff through an eight-week training, which featured both in-person and online components. More than half of the participants were women, more than half were people of color, and more than one-third were members of the LGBTQ community.

In 2019 alone, the NDTC coached more than 17,000 candidates for federal and state office. By mid-2019, more than 7,000 people had already signed up for in-person and online programs for the coming year, on pace to surpass 2018 enrollment. In December 2019, the organization raised $651,802 in a single month, with an average contribution of just over $12.

=== Biden and second Trump administrations (2020-present) ===
In 2020, the Democratic Legislative Campaign Committee (DLCC) announced a partnership with the NDTC to provide state legislative candidates access to more than 70 online courses on running a campaign. The Guardian noted that the NDTC was further focused on down-ballot races because of concerns of a potential "red wave" in the 2022 midterm elections. In 2023, the NDTC raised $6.3 million in revenue from donations. By the mid-2020s, the organization reported having trained more than 128,000 candidates, campaign staff, volunteers, and local Democratic leaders, with an annual program budget of more than $5 million.

In 2025, the NDTC released what was described by Wired as the first official AI playbook for Democratic campaigns, accompanied by new online training designed to help candidates leverage artificial intelligence. The free course was developed in collaboration with Higher Ground Institute and was targeted primarily at smaller campaigns. The New York Times noted that the course said campaigns should not create AI-generated content because it "undermines democratic discourse and voter trust." The course drew 250 enrollees within days of its launch. Senator Bernie Sanders also partnered in 2025 with the NDTC and Run for Something.

In May 2026, more than 100 Democratic candidates across Illinois gathered at Illinois State University for an NDTC campaign bootcamp. It held a July session in Atlanta that trained Georgia state legislative candidates.

== Format ==
NDTC offers both on-site trainings and self-paced virtual classes, with students ranging from candidates and their staff to campaign volunteers and activists. Vice noted in 2019 that it was the only major organization providing free in-person trainings to Democratic candidates nationwide. NDTC partners with state Democratic parties to offer trainings. The organization also partners with other Democratic-leaning groups like Run for Something, The Pipeline Fund, and EMILYs List. NDTC trainings cover topics like campaign finance, canvassing, and communications. It has additional trainings on website strategy and digital content creation, social media strategy for campaigns, AI, and other voter outreach topics.

Starting in 2019, NDTC began offering virtual and in-person staff training for Democratic campaign workers. The NDTC conducts hundreds of in-person and virtual trainings each year across all 50 states.

== Reception ==
NDTC claims its trainings helped elect more than 170 Democrats in the 2018 United States elections, including three congressional candidates. Notable alumni of the organization include Representative Lauren Underwood and Representative Maxwell Frost, who headlined a candidate cohort training in March 2026. Underwood also served as an honorary co-chair of NDTC, alongside Katie Porter and Nikema Williams. The NDTC has also partnered with Sen. Bernie Sanders on training progressive candidates to run for office. The group has been generally welcomed by state Democratic parties, with former head of the North Dakota Democratic Party Kylie Oversen stating the group has helped state parties encourage potential candidates to run for office. Gov. Tom Wolf and nine other Democratic governors released a statement that announced their support of NDTC's work. In news profiles, some state legislative candidates, including candidates in Indiana and Pennsylvania, said they used NDTC's training resources during their campaigns and credited it as helpful to their programs.

The Washington Post reported that some Democrats have criticized the group's former primary fundraising consultant, Mothership Strategies, for aggressive and sometimes misleading tactics, raising concerns that such fundraising could erode trust among small donors.
