= Leopoldo Martínez Nucete =

Venezuelan-American lawyer and politician (born 1964)

Leo Martínez
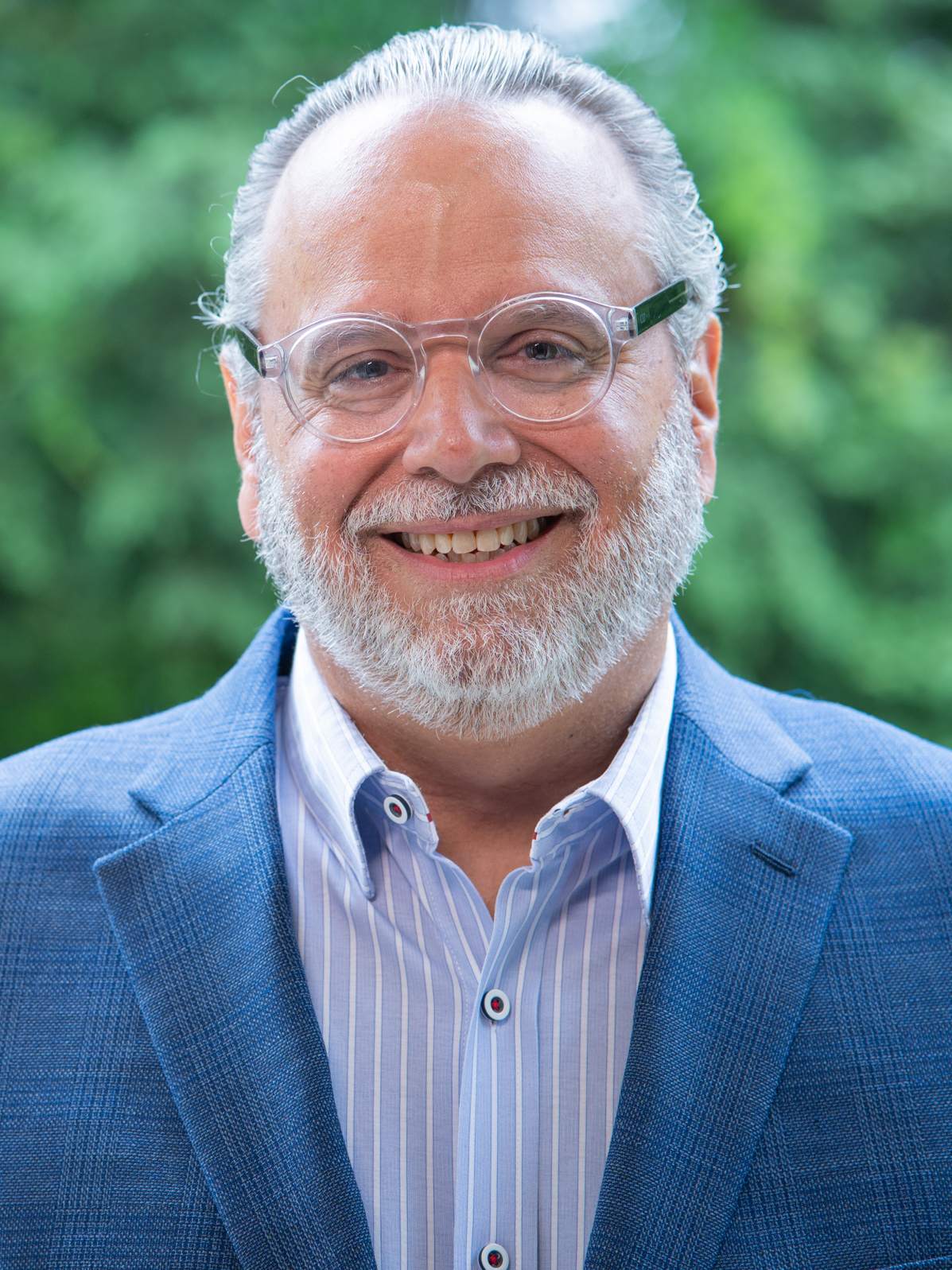
- Martínez in 2025

Member of the Democratic National Committee
- In office 2017–2021

Member of the Venezuelan Chamber of Deputies
- In office July 30, 2000 – January 5, 2005

Personal details
- Born: Leopoldo José Martínez Nucete; October 16, 1964 (age 62) Caracas, Venezuela
- Party: Democratic (U.S.); Justice First (Venezuela); Democratic Action (Venezuela)
- Education: Andrés Bello Catholic University (LLB); Harvard University (LLM); University of Miami (LLM)
- Website: Campaign website

Leopoldo José Martínez Nucete, also known as Leo Martínez (born October 16, 1964), is a Venezuelan-American lawyer, author, and former member of the National Assembly of Venezuela. After immigrating to the United States in 2004 citing political persecution under Venezuelan President Hugo Chávez, he became active in Democratic Party politics and served on the Democratic National Committee from 2017 to 2021. On May 29, 2025, Martínez announced his candidacy for the 2025 special election in the 11th District of Virginia, but lost by a landslide to James Walkinshaw.

== Education and early career ==
Martínez Nucete earned his law degree at the Andrés Bello Catholic University (UCAB), completed an LL.M. at Harvard University in 1989, spent 1995 as a visiting scholar at Harvard Law School, and undertook a Mid-Career Fellowship in International Studies and Economic Policy at Princeton University's School of Public and International Affairs in 1996. He later obtained a second LL.M. from the University of Miami in 2008. Martínez taught constitutional law at UCAB and published his first book, Democracia Económica (Princeton Academic Press, 1996), followed by 94 Paradoxes to Consider in the 21st Century (Editorial Dahbar, 2019), which was featured at the Hay Festival Cartagena in February 2020.

After serving as an opposition deputy in Venezuela's National Assembly from 2000 to 2005. He had left the country in 2004, stating that threats of arrest and asset seizure followed his criticism of President Hugo Chávez.

== Career ==
=== Venezuelan politics ===
Martínez Nucete began his political career with the Democratic Action (Acción Democrática) party, which has an international affiliation with Socialist International, together with the majority of social democratic parties in Europe and worldwide. Like most social democratic parties in other countries, in Venezuela Acción Democrática was key in establishing democracy, leading the struggle against the right wing authoritarian dictatorship of General Marcos Pérez Jiménez, as well as defeating (through the decisive actions of democratically elected governments) the incursion of communists "guerrillas" in Venezuela, during the 60s. Martínez Nucete's grandparents José Nucete Sardi and Leopoldo Martínez Olavarria were closely connected to the foundation and democratic struggles protagonized by Acción Democrática; and his father, businessman Bernardo Martínez Acosta, was a high-level official under the Presidencies of Carlos Andrés Pérez and Jaime Lusinchi, both from Acción Democrática.

In the parliamentary elections of 2000, Leopoldo Martínez was elected as an independent Assembly member supported by an alliance between the Governor of the State of Miranda Enrique Mendoza with various electoral movements and the Primero Justicia party. His relation with Primero Justicia ended as a result of being called to occupy the position of Minister of Finance in the "de facto" government that was intended to be formed after the coup d'état of April 2002. However, Martínez never accepted that position. As a result of these events, Leopoldo Martínez sat in parliament as an independent until 2005, resuming his ties to Acción Democrática. During his tenure as a member of the Assembly, Martinez Nucete denounced what he considered the authoritarian trends of the Chavez government, as well as its poor management of the economy and corruption.

Between the years of 2002 and 2005 members of Chavez's parliamentary fraction petition the Supreme Court to authorize the impeachment of Martinez Nucete as a conspirator and traitor of the national interest. Their request was dismissed by the Supreme Court on April 25, 2005 (Judgement 13, case 2002–00074), but without prejudice, leaving the window open for future political prosecution. Therefore, Martinez has forced to flee the country with his family, to avoid further personal persecution; which had already included the confiscation by the government of some of his family assets. After years of successful litigation efforts against this confiscation, the process was ended in 24 hours, adverse to the Martinez family, with an irregular ruling of the Constitutional Chamber of the Supreme Court which, in their Judgement 1863 on December 19, 2014 (case 14–1342), returned the asset to the control of the government.

=== American politics and advocacy ===
Martínez Nucete became a U.S. citizen and resides in McLean, Virginia. As its founder, he acted as the CEO of the Center for Democracy and Development of the Americas (CDDA/IQLatino) publishers of IQLatino, and served as a board member and chair of the National Committee (after being the first chairman of the board) of the Latino Victory Project. He is known for his advocacy on immigrant rights, social justice and economic equity, Latino empowerment, and prioritizing the U.S. relations in the Americas through principled foreign policy, diplomatic engagement and effective development policies and investments. For that reason, as the founder of CDDA/IQLatino, he was a founding board member of the influential political action committee Foreign Policy for America and lately, the co-chair of the Venezuela Solutions Group of the Atlantic Council.

In 2018, Tom Pérez appointed him to the national leadership of the Democratic National Committee and he also served as Finance Chair of the DNC's Hispanic Caucus and one of the DNC National Finance Committee Deputy Chairs. Leopoldo Martínez also was a member of the Steering Committee and Central Committee of the Democratic Party of Virginia. Given his leadership roles with Latino Victory, Martinez Nucete has been a supervisor or advisor for the presidential campaigns of Hillary Clinton (2016) and Joe Biden (2020). He has also been a supervisor or advisor in more than 50 political campaigns of candidates for the United States Congress or Senate, as well as candidates for governor or legislators in states such as Virginia, Maryland, Pennsylvania, New York, Florida, California, Texas, New Mexico, Nevada, and Arizona. Martinez Nucete has also been a supporter of capacity building efforts in the progressive ecosystem, through his involvement as board member of the National Democratic Training Committee.

In his activism and advocacy on Latino empowerment, with the Latino Victory Project and as a DNC member, Leopoldo Martinez spearheaded efforts that led to including the Temporary Protected Status (TPS) for Venezuelan refugees in the Democratic Party's platform of 2020. This has become effective during the Biden–Harris Administration since March 2021.

=== Politics in the United States ===
Leopoldo Martinez served as a member of Small Business Commission in the Commonwealth of Virginia (2017–2019), appointed by Governor Terry McAuliffe. He also was a member of the gubernatorial Transition Committee between Governors Terry McCauliffe and Ralph Northam in Virginia (2017). Then, he was appointed by Governor Northam, as member of the Board of Trustees of the University of Mary Washington (2018–2022). As a board member of the university, he served as the chair of the Administration, Finance, Advancement and Facilities Committee, as well as member of the Audit and Executive Committees. The Sorensen Institute at the University of Virginia appointed Leopoldo Martinez Nucete to their Board of Advisors in 2020. The Sorensen Institute, under the leadership of Leopoldo Martinez Nucete with support from CDDA/IQ Latino, created the José Nucete Sardi Fellowships, to increase Latino enrollment in the institute's programs.

On August 10, 2021, President Joe Biden nominated Martinez to be the United States executive director of the Inter-American Development Bank. Hearings were held before the Senate Foreign Relations Committee on December 14, 2021. The committee deadlocked on the nomination in a party-line vote on March 29, 2022. The opposition against Martinez was led by Senator Ted Cruz (R-TX), alleging Martinez Nucete was a member of the "hard left" when in Venezuela, claims which were debunked by Senators Bob Menendez (D-NJ) and Tim Kaine (D-VA), major national Latino organizations, and the national press. On January 23, 2023, President Biden renominated Martinez Nucete for this position before the 118th Congress. The Senate Foreign Relations Committee voted and reported favorably his confirmation vote to the full Senate on March 8, 2023, but his nomination expired on January 3, 2024, without a full senate floor vote and has not been resubmitted.

In May 2024, President Biden appointed Leopoldo Martinez Nucete as Senior Counselor of the Minority Business Development Agency (MBDA) at the U.S. Department of Commerce.

=== 2025 U.S. House campaign ===
Martínez launched his congressional bid on 29 May 2025, joining a Democratic field that initially included attorney Amy Roma and immigration lawyer Krystle Nuevas.

The special election was triggered when Representative Gerry Connolly died while in office, creating an open seat.

Virginia governor Glenn Youngkin set the election date for 9 September 2025; Democrats will use a "fire-house" primary on 22 June 2025 to choose their nominee.

At launch, Martínez listed defending democracy, lowering the cost of living, supporting federal workers and protecting immigrant rights as his top priorities. Martinez was defeated by James Walkinshaw, who won the party's nomination for the 2025 Virginia's 11th congressional district special election.

== Personal life ==
Martínez resettled with his wife and four children in Fairfax County, Virginia.
