= Scott Surovell =

American politician

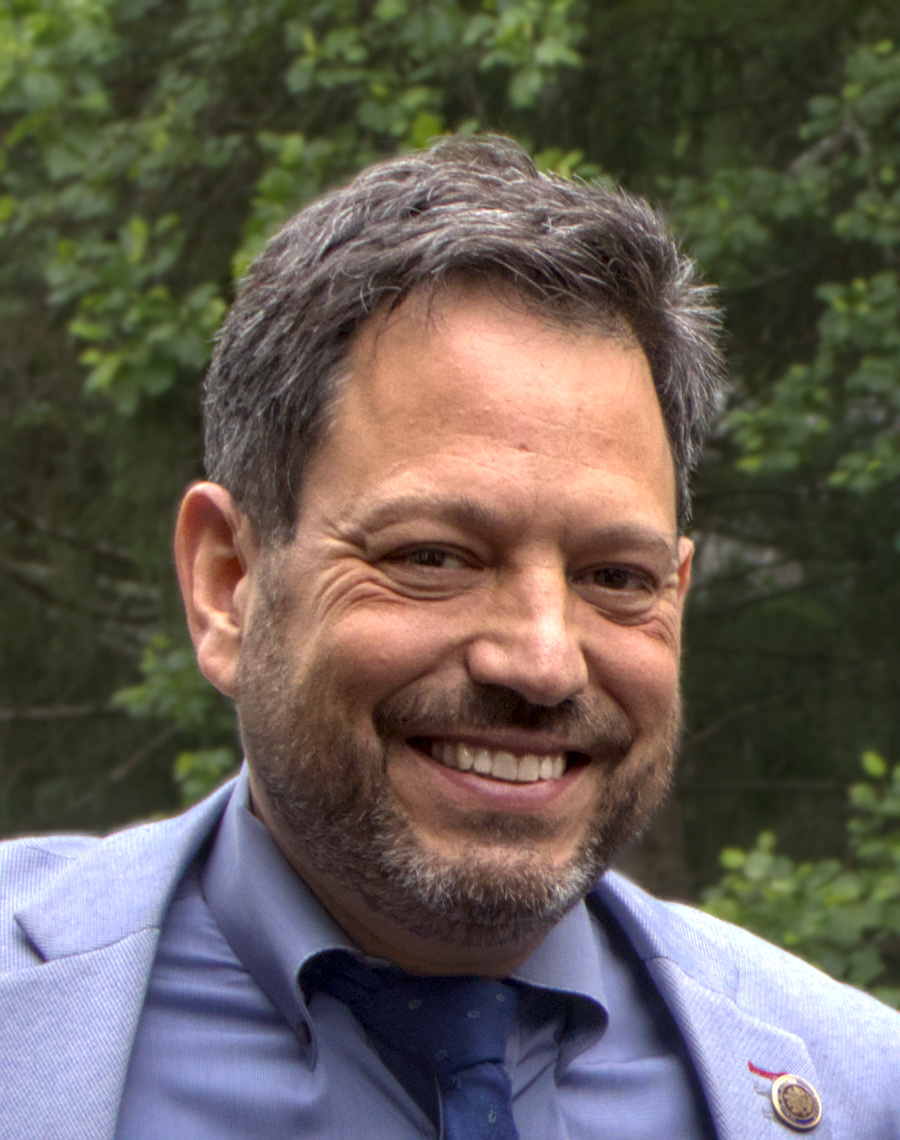
- Surovell in 2025

Majority Leader of the Virginia Senate
- Incumbent
- Assumed office January 10, 2024
- Preceded by: Dick Saslaw

Member of the Virginia Senate
- Incumbent
- Assumed office January 13, 2016
- Preceded by: Toddy Puller
- Constituency: 36th district (2016–2024); 34th district (since 2024)

Member of the Virginia House of Delegates from the 44th district
- In office January 13, 2010 – January 13, 2016
- Preceded by: Kristen Amundson
- Succeeded by: Paul Krizek

Personal details
- Born: Scott Anthony Surovell; August 21, 1971 (age 55) Washington, D.C., U.S.
- Party: Democratic
- Children: 4
- Education: James Madison University (BA); University of Virginia (JD)

Scott Anthony Surovell (born August 21, 1971) is an American lawyer and politician representing Virginia's 34th Senate district, which encompasses the city of Fairfax and portions of Fairfax County. A member of the Democratic Party, he has served as the majority leader of the Virginia Senate since 2024, succeeding Dick Saslaw, who had been the Democratic leader in the Virginia Senate since 1998.

First elected to the Virginia Senate in 2015 to replace retiring Democrat Toddy Puller, Surovell represented the 36th district (which in addition to Fairfax, included portions of Prince William and Stafford counties) until redistricting occurred in 2023. Before entering the Virginia Senate, he represented the 44th district in the Virginia House of Delegates for three terms from 2010 until 2016.

== Early life ==
Surovell grew up in the Tauxemont, Virginia area where he attended preschool, elementary school and intermediate school. In 1989, he graduated from West Potomac High School and went to college at James Madison University, where he was student body vice-president. He graduated in 1993, with a major in Political Science.

=== Professional career ===
In 1993, he served as a Governor's Fellow in the administration of Governor L. Douglas Wilder. Surovell worked for DMV Deputy Commissioner Bill Leighty, who later served as chief of staff under governors Mark Warner and Tim Kaine. He also interned in Washington, D.C., for Representative Jim Moran of Virginia and then-congressman Ron Wyden of Oregon.

Surovell earned a J.D. degree from the University of Virginia School of Law in 1996, where he served as executive editor of the Virginia Journal of Environmental Law.

Surovell is a trial lawyer specializing in criminal and traffic defense, domestic relations, personal injury, consumer class action and commercial litigation. In 2002, Surovell founded Surovell Markle Isaacs and Levy PLC, a firm which specialized in representing individuals and small businesses throughout Northern Virginia with four other attorneys. Former state delegate and senator Chap Petersen was a member of the firm from 2005 through 2017.

In 2007, Surovell successfully blocked an insurance company from paying a man convicted of killing his wife $100,000 of life insurance proceeds from his wife's policy. In 2010, Surovell also won a $4.80-million jury verdict in favor of a Vienna family who was permanently injured in a fireworks accident in the Town of Vienna.

=== Political career ===
In 2003, Surovell was elected Chairman of the Mount Vernon District Democratic Committee of the Fairfax County Democratic Committee. In 2008, he was elected Chairman of the Fairfax County Democratic Committee where he organized and led local campaign activities for the Obama-Biden, Warner, Moran, Connolly and Feder campaigns.

In 2009, Surovell resigned as Chairman of the Fairfax County Democratic Committee in order to run for the House of Delegates.

Surovell has served on the Counties, Cities and Towns Committee (2010-2015), the Science & Technology Committee (2010-2015), and the Militia, Police & Public Safety Committee (2012-2015). In 2014, the Speaker appointed Delegate Surovell to the Virginia Broadband Commission. In 2014, Surovell was elected Caucus Chairman by the Virginia House Democratic Caucus.

For several years Surovell has written a blog, entitled The Dixie Pig, named after a now-defunct restaurant on U.S. Route 1 in his district that was his grandmother’s favorite.

In January 2015 Surovell announced a run for the Virginia Senate, District 36, hoping to fill the seat of retiring Senator Toddy Puller. He won election to the State Senate by a margin of 60.52% to 39.28%.

Surovell was appointed to the General Laws and Technology Committee, Rehabilitation and Social Services Committee and Local Government Committee. In 2016, Surovell was also appointed to the Virginia High Speed Rail Commission. In 2018, Surovell was elected Senate Democratic Caucus Whip. In 2019, Surovell was elected Vice Chairman of the Senate Democratic Caucus.

In 2016, Surovell passed legislation requiring government officials to redact public documents instead of withholding entire records and passed similar legislation applying to homeowner, condo and cooperative associations the following year. He also passed legislation creating civil penalties for destroying public records to avoid Freedom of Information Act requests.

Starting in 2016, Surovell has pushed and passed various legislative initiatives to clean up coal ash ponds in Virginia, one of which is in Dumfries, Virginia. In 2019, he was the Chief Sponsor of legislation that prohibited coal ash in the Chesapeake Bay watershed from being stored in existing partially-lined ponds, required at least 25% to be recycled into products, and the remainder stored in modern lined landfills in excess of Environmental Protection Agency minimum requirements. The ultimate cost will exceed $3.2 billion or approximately $1.5 billion more than Dominion Power's original proposal.

In 2018, Surovell carried legislation that authorized $3.4 million of payments from the Commonwealth of Virginia to pay for the wrongful incarceration of the Norfolk Four if the funds were matched by the City of Norfolk. That same year he also carried legislation he had introduced nine times which raised Virginia's threshold between misdemeanors and felonies to $500.

In 2020, Surovell carried legislation that allowed undocumented immigrants to obtain driver privilege cards. He also was Chief Sponsor of successful legislation to make Virginia the first Southern state to ban conversion therapy, passed legislation banning driving with a handheld mobile phone, and fracking for natural gas anywhere east of Interstate 95 in the Commonwealth of Virginia.

In 2021, Surovell was chief sponsor of legislation to repeal Virginia's death penalty after four centuries of it being legal. He also led the efforts to reform Virginia's restrictive law prohibiting expungement or sealing of misdemeanor and felony convictions, and led the study and legislation that expanded the Court of Appeals of Virginia from 11 to 17 judges and provided of right of appeal in every civil and criminal case like every other state.

In 2022, Surovell supported legislation to allow for methane capture.

In November 2023, Surovell was elected Majority Leader of the Virginia Senate.

== Electoral history ==
Surovell first ran for the Virginia House of Delegates during the 2009 elections to replace retiring Democratic incumbent Kristen J. Amundson. He defeated his Republican challenger 53% to 44%, and was sworn into office the following January in Richmond, Virginia.

Virginia's House of Delegates 44th district election, 2009
Party	Candidate	Votes	%
Democratic	Scott Surovell	9,960	54.3
Republican	Jay McConville	8,384	45.7

Virginia's House of Delegates 44th district election, 2011
Party	Candidate	Votes	%
Democratic	Scott Surovell	8,738	59.38
Republican	John Barsa	5,742	39.02
Independent	Joe Glean	223	1.52

Virginia's House of Delegates 44th district election, 2013
Party	Candidate	Votes	%
Democratic	Scott Surovell	13,177	71.66
Independent	Joe Glean	5,210	28.34

Virginia Senate 36th district election, 2015
Party	Candidate	Votes	%
Democratic	Scott Surovell	18,320	60.52
Republican	Gerard M. Foreman II	11,890	39.28

Virginia Senate 36th district election, 2019
Party	Candidate	Votes	%
Democratic	Scott Surovell	37,518	91.72
None	Write-In	3,382	8.28

Virginia Senate 34th district election, 2023
Party	Candidate	Votes	%
Democratic	Scott Surovell	38,140	69.75
Republican	Mark A. Springman	16,389	29.97

Virginia House of Delegates
Preceded by Kristen Amundson	Member of the Virginia House of Delegates from the 44th district 2010–2016	Succeeded by Paul Krizek
Senate of Virginia
Preceded by Toddy Puller	Member of the Virginia Senate from the 36th district 2016–2024	Succeeded by Stella Pekarsky
Preceded by Chap Petersen	Member of the Virginia Senate from the 34th district 2024–present	Incumbent
Preceded by Dick Saslaw	Majority Leader of the Virginia Senate; 2024–present	Incumbent
