= Braddock, Virginia =

Coordinates: 38°49′15″N 77°04′05″W

Braddock
- Census-designated place
- Location within the state of Virginia Braddock (the United States)
- Country: United States of America
- State: Virginia
- County: Fairfax

Area
  - Total: 6.38 sq mi (16.52 km^{2})

Population (2020)
  - Total: 6,549
  - Density: 1,027/sq mi (396.4/km^{2})
- Time zone: UTC-5 (Eastern (EST))
  - Summer (DST): UTC-4 (EDT)
- FIPS code: 5109072

Braddock is a census-designated place in Fairfax County, Virginia, United States. It was first listed as a CDP in the 2020 census with a population of 6,549.

== Demographics ==
Braddock first appeared as a census designated place in the 2020 U.S. census.

=== 2020 Census ===
Braddock CDP, Virginia – Racial and ethnic composition Note: the US Census treats Hispanic/Latino as an ethnic category. This table excludes Latinos from the racial categories and assigns them to a separate category. Hispanics/Latinos may be of any race.
Race / Ethnicity (NH = Non-Hispanic)	Pop 2020	2020
White alone (NH)	3,851	58.80%
Black or African American alone (NH)	248	3.79%
Native American or Alaska Native alone (NH)	5	0.08%
Asian alone (NH)	1,560	23.82%
Native Hawaiian or Pacific Islander alone (NH)	2	0.03%
Other race alone (NH)	43	0.66%
Mixed race or Multiracial (NH)	422	6.44%
Hispanic or Latino (any race)	418	6.38%
Total	6,549	100.00%

At the 2020 census (some information from the 2022 American Community Survey) there were 6,549 people, 2,231 housing units and 2,240 households residing in the CDP. The population density was 1,026.5 inhabitants per square mile (396.3 inhabitants/km^{2}). The average housing unit density was 349.7 per square mile (135.0/km^{2}). The racial makeup of the CDP was 59.83% White, 3.91% African American, 0.17% Native American, 23.93% Asian, 0.03% Pacific Islander, 2.35% from other races, and 9.79% from two or more races. Hispanic or Latino of any race was 6.38% of the population.

Of the family households, 73.1% were married couples, 7.4% were a male family householder with no spouse, and 15.9% were a female family householder with no spouse. The average family household had 3.26 people.

The median age was 48.3, 22.6% of people were under the age of 18, and 22.6% were 65 years of age or older. The largest ancestry is the 15.2% who had English ancestry, 21.0% spoke a language other than English at home, and 21.7% were born outside the United States, 84.3% of whom were naturalized citizens.

The median income for a household in the CDP was $229,100. 11.8% of the population were military veterans, and 71.1% had a batchelor's degree or higher. In the CDP 0.1% of the population was below the poverty line, none of those under age 18 and 0.2% of those age 65 or over, with 3.1% of the population without health insurance.
