= Toddy Puller =

American politician (born 1945)

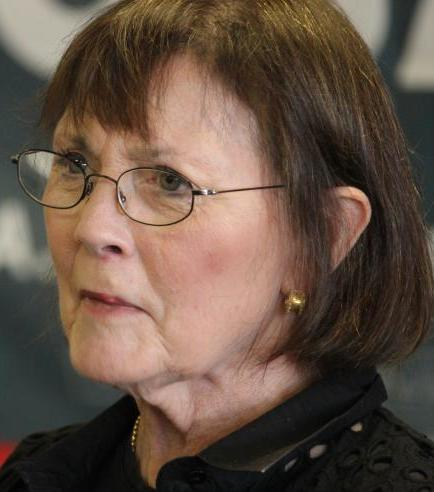
- Puller in 2012

Member of the Virginia Senate from the 36th district
- In office January 12, 2000 – January 13, 2016
- Preceded by: Joseph V. Gartlan, Jr.
- Succeeded by: Scott Surovell

Member of the Virginia House of Delegates from the 44th district
- In office January 8, 1992 – January 12, 2000
- Preceded by: Gerald Fill
- Succeeded by: Kristen J. Amundson

Personal details
- Born: January 19, 1945 (age 81) Cedar Rapids, Iowa, U.S.
- Party: Democratic
- Spouse: Lewis Burwell Puller, Jr. (died 1994)
- Children: Lewis, Maggie
- Education: Mary Washington College
- Occupation: Consultant
- Committees: Rehabilitation and Social Services (chair); Commerce and Labor; Courts of Justice; Local Government; Rules
- Website: www.toddy.org

Linda Todd "Toddy" Puller (born January 19, 1945) is an American politician. A Democrat, she served in the Virginia House of Delegates 1992–1999 and was elected to the Senate of Virginia in November 1999. For sixteen years she represented the 36th district, made up of parts of Fairfax, Prince William and Stafford counties.

== Personal life ==
Puller's father was a United States Army officer. She received a B.A. degree in Art History from Mary Washington College in 1967, after which she taught elementary school in Woodbridge, Virginia.

Puller married Lewis Burwell Puller, Jr., son of United States Marine Corps Lieutenant General Chesty Puller. Her husband lost both legs in the Vietnam War and spent years fighting depression. He committed suicide in 1994, two years after winning a Pulitzer Prize for his autobiography, Fortunate Son. A biography of Lewis Puller includes this comment,

It was primarily through the patience and unflagging love of his wife (to whom the book is dedicated) that Puller was able to survive his recuperation. Not that that love was untested: at their initial reunion, Puller, confined to a wheelchair, instructed his five-months-pregnant wife to divorce him rather than be burdened by a cripple. Toddy persevered, helping Puller through law school and assisting him in his unsuccessful bid for a seat in Congress. It was the failure of this Congressional run that drove Puller to heavy alcoholism and, ultimately, to attempt suicide--only to be saved, once again, by his wife. "Toddy," observed New York Times reviewer Herbert Mitgang, "is something of a heroine in the story; her loyalty makes the author seem like a very fortunate husband."

They had one son, Lewis, who became a professional athlete, and a daughter, Maggie.

Puller suffered a stroke in 1997, which limited her movement, though she continued to serve in the House and later was elected to the Virginia Senate, serving until her retirement in 2015.

== Legislative career ==
Puller was a member of the Senate committees on Commerce and Labor, Courts of Justice, Local Government, Rehabilitation and Social Services (Chair), and Rules. In 2010 55% of the bills she sponsored or supported passed the Virginia Senate. Of all of the co-patrons of her bills, 56% were Democrats, 44% were Republicans.

In July 2011, the Governor of Virginia, Bob McDonnell, signed 'Ashley's Law' which requires emergency responders to use their flashing lights and sirens when entering an intersection against a red light or else yield to traffic. The bill had been written and sponsored by Puller after a young woman was killed in 2008 when her automobile was struck crossing US Route 1 in Fairfax County, Virginia by a speeding police vehicle whose driver had not activated the siren.

According to the Charleston Gazette-Mail, she has been "the Senate's most forceful and authoritative voice for veterans' issues" for her work on property tax exemptions for disabled veterans, and her support of Virginia's Wounded Warriors Program.

Puller was re-elected to the Virginia Senate in November 2011 with 55% of the votes.
