= Firehouse primary =

Primary organized by a party (not government)

A firehouse primary, also called a firehouse caucus or "unassembled caucus", is a term sometimes used in the United States to describe a primary election run by a political party, not a government, to select the party's candidates for a later general election. Firehouse primaries were originally held in public buildings such as firehouses.

== United States ==
Because firehouse primaries are held with more limited locations and time frames than state-run primaries, and party officials have more control over who the candidates are, firehouse primaries have been criticized as relatively undemocratic by some commentators.

=== Virginia ===
The term has been used principally for special elections in the U.S. state of Virginia. A 2021 law authored by Virginia state delegate Dan Helmer which requires firehouse primaries to not discriminate against disabled or remote voters who are otherwise unable to vote in the primary, was the subject of a federal lawsuit by the 6th District Committee of the Republican Party of Virginia on grounds of freedom of association.

=== Other states ===
South Carolina Democrats used a firehouse caucus in 2000 for presidential nomination. During disputes between the Democratic National Committee and the state Democratic parties of Florida and Michigan over the 2008 Democratic Party presidential primaries, a potential "do-over" of both states' primaries in a firehouse setting was floated but never used.

For the 2020 Democratic party presidential primaries, Alaska, Hawaii, Kansas, and North Dakota conducted firehouse primaries largely by mail. North Dakota used the term firehouse caucus for its event.

A closed, ranked-choice firehouse primary was conducted for the 2024 Democratic presidential primary in Missouri due to the abolition of state-run presidential primaries by the Missouri General Assembly, as was a Republican presidential firehouse caucus. A firehouse caucus was held in Idaho by the Democratic Party under similar circumstances in 2024.

== Elsewhere ==
Systems similar to 'Firehouse primaries' are the norm for the selection of candidates for public office in political parties outside of the United States and some parts of South America. The selection of candidates to compete for political officer on behalf of a political party in European nations is usually done by paying party members or party officials, or a mix of both, often without the use of any public infrastructure or direct funding. It is unusual for there to be any particularly strict or explicit legislation governing how parties can select their candidates. In some countries, such as the United Kingdom and other countries using the Westminster system, party leaders are automatically candidates for prime minister and no separate selection process is held. Terms like 'party selection', 'party election' or another local term are more likely to be used than 'firehouse primary'. Most countries also do not have a system for voters to publicly register as identifying with a particular political party as in the United States which makes it more difficult to hold primaries separated by party affiliation.
