= Virginia's 10th House of Delegates district =

Virginia legislative district

Virginia's 10th State House of Delegates district
- District map from the 2023 election
Delegate
Dan Helmer; D–Fairfax County
- Demographics: 47% White; 6% Black; 14% Hispanic; 26% Asian; 0% Native American; 0% Hawaiian/Pacific Islander; 0% Other; 6% Multiracial
- Population (2024) • Voting age: 83,555; 18
- Registered voters: 63,573

Virginia's 10th House of Delegates district elects one of the 100 members of the Virginia House of Delegates, the lower house of the state's bicameral legislature. The district includes portions of Fairfax County. The district's representative is Democrat Dan Helmer.

== Elections ==
=== 2017 ===
In the 2017 general election, Democrat Wendy Gooditis challenged incumbent Republican Randy Minchew; she won by almost 4%.

=== 2019 ===
In 2019, the same candidates faced off again, with each raising more than a million dollars for the race. Gooditis won by roughly 5%.

== District officeholders ==
Years	Delegate	Party	Electoral history
January 9, 2002 – January 11, 2012	Ward Armstrong	Democratic	Minority Leader of the Virginia House of Delegates (2007-12); Defeated in bid for reelection
January 2012 – January 10, 2018	Randy Minchew	Republican	Defeated in bid for reelection
January 10, 2018 – January 10, 2024	Wendy Gooditis	Democratic	First elected in 2017 (redistricted to the 31st District declined to seek reelection)
January 10, 2024 – present	Dan Helmer	Democratic	Redistricted from the 40th District

== Electoral history ==
Date	Election	Candidate	Party	Votes	%
Virginia House of Delegates, 10th district
Nov 6, 2001	General	W. L. Armstrong	Democratic	10,050	53.1
Nov 6, 2001	General	B. L. Geisler	Republican	8,873	46.9
Nov 4, 2003	General	W. L. Armstrong	Democratic	13,693	99.7
Nov 4, 2003	General	Write Ins		36	0.3
Nov 8, 2005	General	W. L. Armstrong	Democratic	11,377	63.4
Nov 8, 2005	General	D. G. Young	Republican	6,553	36.5
Nov 8, 2005	General	Write Ins		7	0
Nov 6, 2007	General	Ward L. Armstrong	Democratic	15,212	98.6
Nov 6, 2007	General	Write Ins		218	1.4
Nov 3, 2009	General	Ward L. Armstrong	Democratic	9,084	56.5
Nov 3, 2009	General	C. Edward Creed, II	Republican	6,990	43.4
Nov 3, 2009	General	Write Ins		16	0.1
Nov 8, 2011	General	John Randall Minchew	Republican	8,140	58.4
Nov 8, 2011	General	David Scott Butler	Democratic	5,789	41.5
Nov 8, 2011	General	Write Ins		19	0.1
Nov 5, 2013	General	John Randall Minchew	Republican	12,950	57.0
Nov 5, 2013	General	Monte Antoine Johnson	Democratic	9,723	42.8
Nov 5, 2013	General	Write Ins		44	0.2
Nov 3, 2015	General	John Randall Minchew	Republican	10,415	62.0
Nov 3, 2015	General	Peter Carlin Rush	Democratic	6,355	37.8
Nov 3, 2015	General	Write Ins		36	0.2
Nov 7, 2017	General	Gwendolyn Wallace Gooditis	Democratic	15,161	51.9
Nov 7, 2017	General	John Randall Minchew	Republican	14,025	48.0
Nov 7, 2017	General	Write Ins		26	0.1
Nov 5, 2019	General	Gwendolyn Wallace Gooditis	Democratic	15,928	52.3
Nov 5, 2019	General	John Randall Minchew	Republican	14,500	47.6
Nov 5, 2019	General	Write Ins		21	0.1
Nov 2, 2021	General	Wendy W. Gooditis	Democratic	21,229	50.9
Nov 2, 2021	General	Nicholas Schar Clemente	Republican	20,406	48.9
Nov 2, 2021	General	Write Ins		58	0.1
Nov 7, 2023	General	Dan I. Helmer	Democratic	15,569	59.4
Nov 7, 2023	General	James A. Thomas, Jr.	Republican	10,547	40.3
Nov 7, 2023	General	Write Ins		76	0.3
