= Wendy Gooditis =

American politician

Member of the Virginia House of Delegates from the 10th district
- In office January 10, 2018 – January 10, 2024
- Preceded by: Randy Minchew
- Succeeded by: Dan Helmer (redistricted)

Personal details
- Born: 1960 (age 65–66) New Brunswick, New Jersey, U.S.
- Party: Democratic
- Spouse: Christopher Gooditis
- Children: 2
- Education: Rutgers University, New Brunswick (BS); Shenandoah University (MS)

Gwendolyn Wallace Gooditis is an American real estate agent, educator, and politician, known as Wendy Gooditis. A Democrat, Gooditis was elected in November 2017 to represent Virginia's 10th House of Delegates district in the Virginia House of Delegates. The 10th district consisted of portions of Loudoun, Clarke and Frederick counties.

Gooditis lost her brother to mental illness in 2017, shortly after announcing her House of Delegates campaign. Gooditis has said that this experience strengthened her determination to pass legislation focused on expanding Medicaid, suicide prevention, and combatting child abuse.

Gooditis was vice chair of the Agriculture, Chesapeake and Natural Resources Committee. She also served on the Labor & Commerce and Counties, Cities, and Towns committees.

== Early life and education ==
Gooditis grew up in Cranbury, New Jersey; she lived in Virginia for 25 years before running for office. Formerly a contractor for Bell Laboratories, Gooditis became a teacher in the 2000s, teaching in the Clarke County, Virginia public schools and at a private school. Gooditis then became a real estate agent.

Prior to moving to Virginia, Gooditis was shortlisted for the U.S. Olympic equestrian team as a 3-day eventer.

== Political career ==
Gooditis's successful 2017 run for the 10th district seat in the Virginia House of Delegates was her first run for elected office. She defeated incumbent Republican Randy Minchew, who had held the seat since 2011.

=== Bills introduced ===
In 2018, Gooditis introduced House Bill 569, which requires the state to issue an annual report to lawmakers about its progress and activities on suicide prevention. The bill passed with broad bipartisan support and was signed into law in March 2018.

In 2019, Gooditis introduced four bills to combat child abuse. Those bills would change Virginia's definition of child sexual abuse, maintain records of child abuse investigations for three years, make clergy of all religious denominations mandated reporters of child abuse, and penalize those who expose children to domestic violence.

In 2019, Gooditis served as Chief Co-patron of a red flag bill that would allow courts to temporarily remove guns from people who pose an immediate risk to themselves or others.

=== Medicaid ===
Gooditis voted to pass Medicaid expansion in the Virginia General Assembly in March 2018, expanding health care access to 400,000 Virginians.

=== Electoral history ===
Date	Election	Candidate	Party	Votes	%
Virginia House of Delegates, 2nd district
November 7, 2017	General	Wendy Gooditis	Democratic	15,161	51.90%
November 7, 2017	General	Randy Minchew	Republican	14,025	48.01%
November 5, 2019	General	Wendy Gooditis	Democratic	15,928	52.31%
November 5, 2019	General	Randy Minchew	Republican	14,500	47.62%
November 2, 2021	General	Wendy Gooditis	Democratic	21,229	50.02%
November 2, 2021	General	Nick Clemente	Republican	20,408	49.00%

== Awards and recognition ==
In August 2019, Gooditis was given the 2019 HosPAC Healthcare Hero award for her efforts in passing Medicaid expansion in Virginia, helping more than 400,000 Virginians qualify for coverage.

== Personal life ==
Gooditis lives in Boyce, Virginia. She has two children with her husband, Christopher.

== See also ==
- Virginia House of Delegates elections, 2017
- Virginia House of Delegates elections, 2019
