= Nathan Larson (criminal) =

American white supremacist (1980–2022)

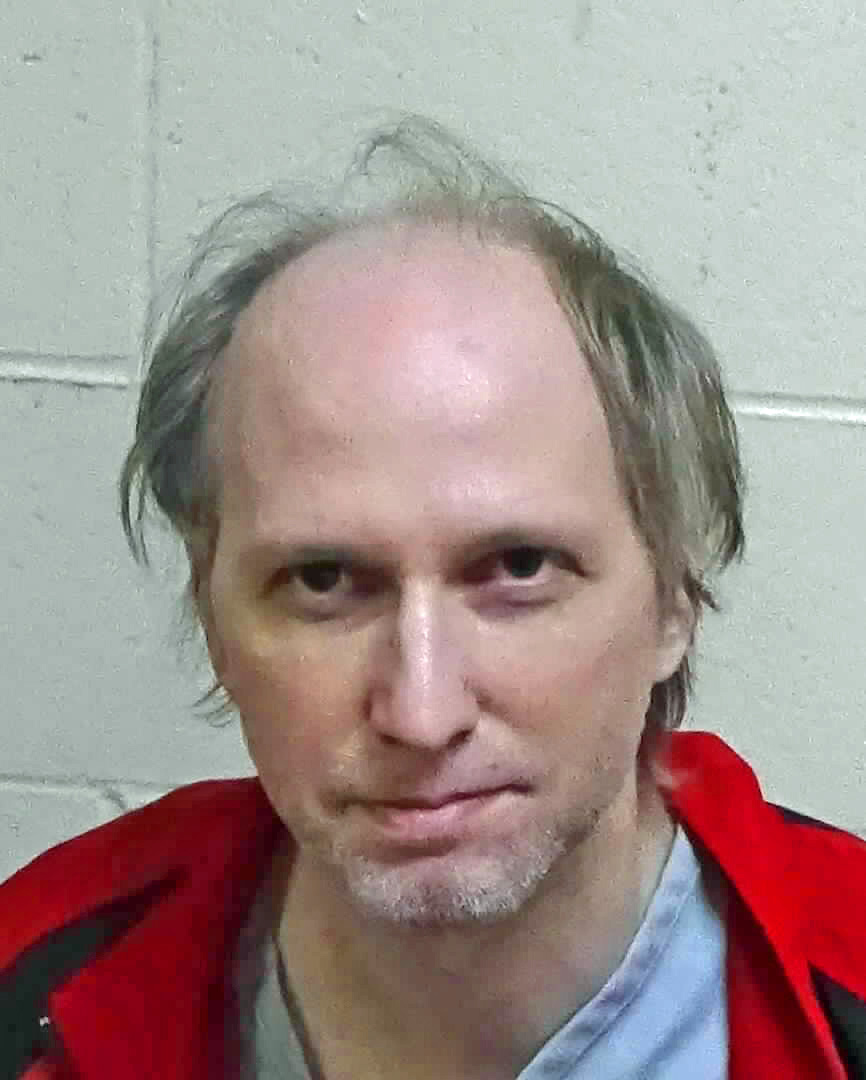
- Larson on February 11, 2021
- Born: Nathan Daniel Larson; September 19, 1980; Charlottesville, Virginia, U.S.
- Died: September 18, 2022 (aged 41); Maricopa County, Arizona, U.S.
- Cause of death: Suicide by starvation
- Education: George Mason University (BS)
- Political party: Independent (2017–2022); Libertarian (2004–2017)
- Movement: White supremacy
- Children: 1
- Conviction: Threatening the President of the United States (18 U.S.C. § 871) (2008)
- Penalty: 16 months imprisonment (2009); Kidnapping-related charges posthumously dismissed

Nathan Daniel Larson (September 19, 1980 – September 18, 2022) was an American white supremacist. A self-described "quasi-neoreactionary libertarian" who unsuccessfully ran for public office several times, he was expelled from the Libertarian Party of Virginia in 2017. Larson advocated for curtailing women's rights and decriminalizing child sexual abuse and incest.

Larson served fourteen months in prison for the felony of threatening the president of the United States in 2008. In 2020, he was arrested at Denver International Airport for kidnapping a 12-year-old girl, facing up to life in prison if he was convicted. According to court records, he intended to take her to his home, sexually assault her, and impregnate her. During a search of his home, detectives found evidence suggesting that he operated a website encouraging pedophilia and child rape. Larson died in custody before trial by starving himself.

== Early life and education ==
Larson was from Charlottesville, Virginia, and lived with his parents in Catlett, Fauquier County. An accountant, Larson earned a degree from George Mason University, where he was a cannabis reform activist.

== Career ==
After graduating from college, Larson became a member of the Libertarian Party. He ran for Congress in Virginia's 1st congressional district as a Libertarian during the 2008 election, running on an anarcho-capitalist platform. He became the Libertarian nominee since he was not contested in the primary, he received less than 2% of the vote in the general election.

As a convicted felon, Larson was barred from seeking state office in Virginia from 2009 until Governor Terry McAuliffe restored voting and candidacy rights to thousands of felons in 2016. The following year he stood as an independent candidate for the Virginia House of Delegates in the 31st district, again receiving less than 2% of the vote. His candidacy was discussed in the 2017 gubernatorial campaign, with the Republican nominee, Ed Gillespie, using it to criticize McAuliffe's action. Larson was expelled from the Libertarian Party of Virginia early that year.

In 2018, Larson again ran as an independent for election to Congress from Virginia's 10th congressional district, before withdrawing in August. He described his views as "quasi-neoreactionary libertarian."

=== Electoral history ===
Date	Election	Candidate	Party	Votes	%
Virginia's 1st congressional district
Nov 4, 2008	General	Robert J. Wittman	Republican	203,839	56.6
Nov 4, 2008	General	Bill S. Day, Jr	Democratic	150,435	41.8
Nov 4, 2008	General	Nathan D. Larson	Libertarian	5,265	1.5
Nov 4, 2008	General	Write-ins		756	nil
Virginia House of Delegates, 31st district
Nov 7, 2017	General	L. Scott Lingamfelter	Republican	12,658	44.2
Nov 7, 2017	General	Elizabeth Guzmán	Democratic	15,466	54.0
Nov 7, 2017	General	Nathan D. Larson	Independent	481	1.7
Nov 7, 2017	General	Write-ins		39	nil
Virginia's 10th congressional district
Nov 6, 2018	General	Barbara Comstock	Republican	160,841	43.7
Nov 6, 2018	General	Jennifer Wexton	Democratic	206,356	56.1
Nov 6, 2018	General	Nathan D. Larson	Independent	Withdrew	
Nov 6, 2018	General	Write-ins		598	0.2

== Political positions and online advocacy ==
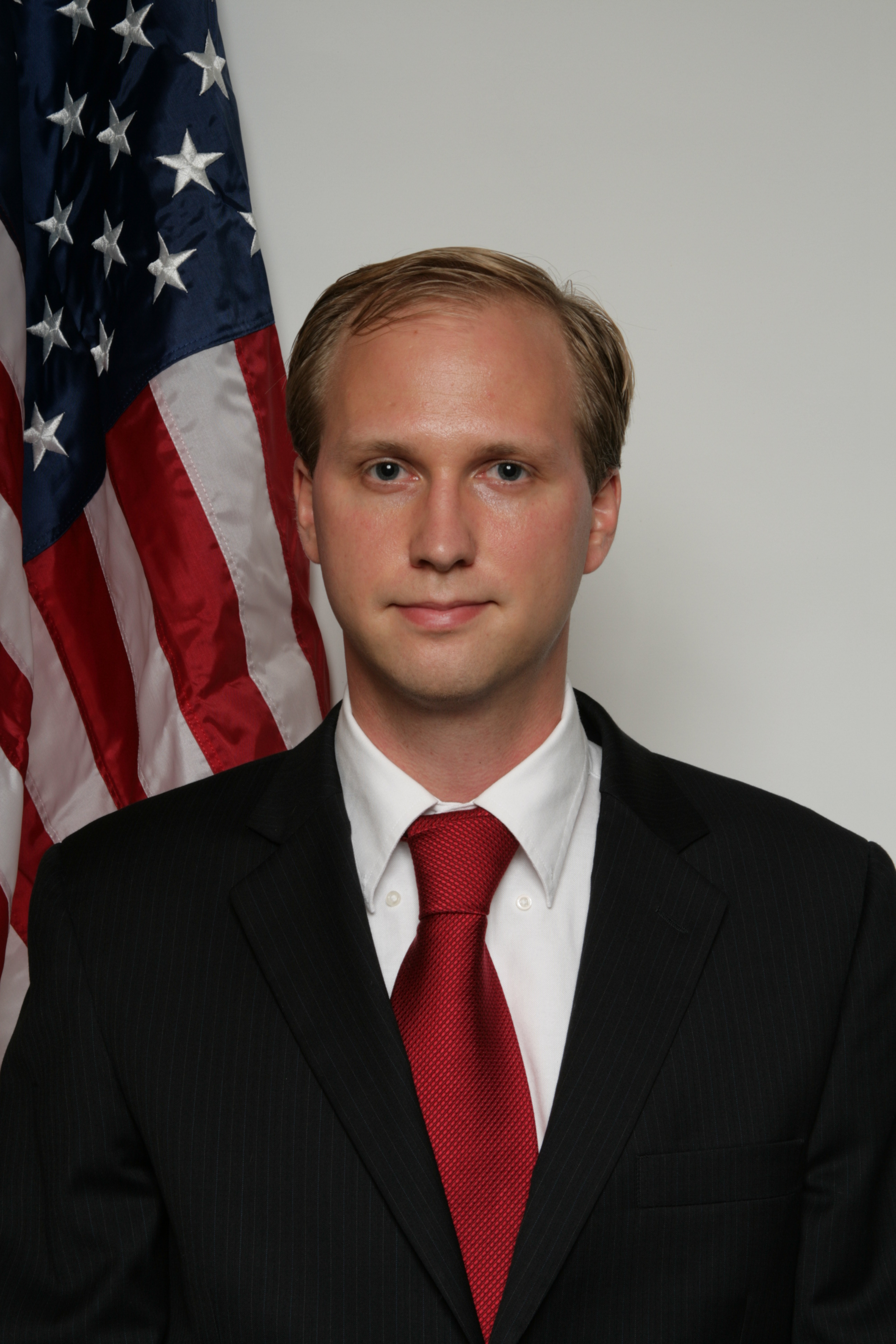
Larson's campaign photo, 2008

In his 2008 candidacy for Congress, Larson advocated doing away with government at all levels, saying, "All government functions could be better performed by the private sector". Endorsed by the Libertarian Party of Virginia, he stated in its newsletter that the primary aim of his candidacy was introducing libertarian ideas; he focused on transportation, proposing that the U.S. highway and rail systems be auctioned off to private owners who would compete to offer toll-based services, and also that private property rights be extended to Chesapeake Bay. In 2017, as a self-described "red pill Libertarian", his platform included legalizing child pornography and polygyny, eliminating state funding for girls' and women's education, and repealing the Nineteenth Amendment to the United States Constitution, which gave women the right to vote.

Larson's online manifesto in 2018, which has since been taken down, advocated for "benevolent white supremacy" and named Adolf Hitler as a "white supremacist hero". It called for free trade, "putting an end to U.S. involvement in foreign wars arising from our country's alliance with Israel", drug legalization, suicide rights, protection of gun ownership rights, legalization of child pornography, legalization of incestous marriage, and repeal of the 1994 Violence Against Women Act. Regarding women, he stated: "We need to switch to a system that classifies women as property, initially of their fathers and later of their husbands"; he blamed school shootings on feminism, saying: "Guns don't kill people – feminists do." After withdrawing his candidacy in August 2018, he offered his endorsement to Democrat Jennifer Wexton, giving as one of his reasons that the Republican incumbent, Barbara Comstock, "continually takes the side of career women". Wexton declined his endorsement. On white supremacy, he said that whites are supposedly superior to other races because of "our cultural creativeness, our willingness to invest in the long term rather than living for today, and our conscientious desire to do the right thing even if it requires heroic self-sacrifice for the good of society", and must resist Jews' attempts to "attain complete supremacy" in the U.S., which would lead to their "destroy[ing] what made this country worth living in".

Larson began editing Wikipedia in 2004, initially under his real name. One of his focuses on Wikipedia was reportedly his desire to make taboo or illegal topics, including child sexual abuse, culturally acceptable. Larson ran a large number of sock puppet accounts, which he used to promote positions such as decriminalizing child sexual abuse and argue against Wikipedia's child protection policy. He was blocked in 2008 and later banned from the site entirely; he first moved to Wikiversity, a Wikimedia Foundation project for learning tutorials and academic articles, then to the skeptic wiki RationalWiki. According to Haaretz, he may have been the first person to be banned from RationalWiki.

Larson also created Internet chat rooms for self-identified "incels" (involuntarily celibate men) and for pedophiles, incelocalypse.today and suiped.org (short for suicidal pedophile), and wrote posts on the sites endorsing child rape and describing himself as a "hebephilic rapist". Both sites were removed by hosting company DreamHost in late May 2018 after a complaint by the website Babe.net. He was also creator and administrator of the website rapey.to (later .so, .co, and .su) which had more than 7000 users and was outed and shut down by the efforts of hacker Ryan Montgomery. Larson told The Huffington Post in response to a question about whether he was actually a pedophile or merely wrote about it online, "It's a mix of both ... When people go over the top there's a grain of truth to what they say." He described the term as "vague" and described men being attracted to underage girls as "normal". He also advocated for father-daughter incest.

== Legal issues ==
In 2009, Larson pleaded guilty to sending a letter in December 2008 to the U.S. Secret Service threatening to kill the President of the United States. At that time, the message was sent just after Barack Obama was elected president while George W. Bush was still in office, although Larson did not specify which president the threat was for. He was sentenced to sixteen months' imprisonment and three years' supervised release; he served fourteen months. In March 2017, he described the letter as "an act of civil disobedience".

In August 2010, Larson wrote to the federal prosecutor describing the mental health treatment he had received after his conviction as "a complete waste of taxpayer money" since he did not have a mental illness and announced that he would violate the terms of his release from prison: "If you happen to hear the distinctive sound of gunfire of a Solothurn S-18/100 20 mm Anti-Tank Cannon emanating from my backyard, as cardboard cutouts of statist federal politicians, federal judges, federal prosecutors, and federal agents become riddled with large, ragged bullet holes, please know, that there is nothing amiss; it is just me engaging in target practice".

Larson admitted to raping his ex-spouse, who was transgender, and who died by suicide after the birth of their daughter. In November 2015 a jury in Colorado denied him custody of the girl, and he announced the following month that he would seek legal termination of his parental rights. He eventually remarried.

On December 14, 2020, Larson was arrested at Denver International Airport on felony charges of attempted kidnapping, child abduction, soliciting child pornography from a minor, and meeting a child for the intention of sex, along with a misdemeanor charge of harboring a minor. The charges were in relation to an alleged plot to kidnap a 12-year-old girl from California. Larson had met the victim in October 2020 and convinced her to send him inappropriate images of herself, and eventually to leave her home to fly back with him to Virginia. Authorities intercepted Larson and the girl while they were in Denver for a layover. During a search of Larson's Virginia home, detectives found evidence suggesting that he operated a website encouraging, and facilitating sharing media of, pedophilia and child rape. A criminal complaint was filed against Larson on December 23, 2020, and he was indicted on multiple federal charges. (Note: The indictment against Larson listed five federal charges - kidnapping and attempt under 18 USC §1201(a)(1), (d), and (g), transportation of a minor with intent to engage in illegal sexual activity under 18 USC §2423(a), coercion and enticement of a minor under 18 USC §2422(b), sexual exploitation of a minor and attempt under 18 USC §2251(a) and (e), and receipt and distribution of material involving the sexual exploitation of minors under 18 USC 2252(a)(2). It also listed a forfeiture allegation under 18 USC §§ 981(a)(1)(C), 2253(a), 2428, and 28 USC 2461(c).) Because the victim was a minor and Larson was not a family member, he faced a minimum of twenty years in prison on the kidnapping charge and up to life in prison on the charge of transportation of a minor with intent to engage in illegal sexual activity.

At his arraignment on February 25, 2021, Larson pleaded not guilty to the charges and requested to represent himself under Faretta v. California. He was initially represented by attorney Peter M. Jones; in March 2022, Judge Jennifer L. Thurston granted him pro se status and allowed him to represent himself. His pro se status was revoked on March 31 and Jones was re-appointed to represent him for all further proceedings.

== Death ==
Larson died in custody in an Arizona facility on September 18, 2022. On October 11, the indictment against him was dismissed. His cause of death was reported in 2023 as self-starvation.
