= James N. Stubbs =

American politician (1839–1919)

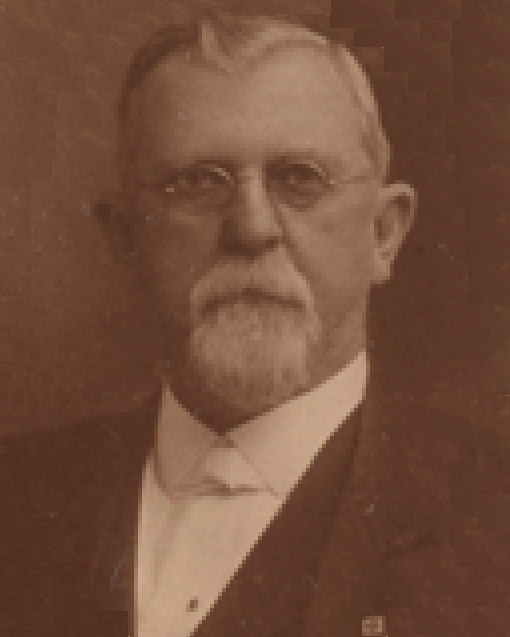

Member of the Virginia House of Delegates from Gloucester County
- In office January 9, 1918 – April 10, 1919
- Preceded by: Myon E. Bristow
- Succeeded by: John W. C. Catlett
- In office January 14, 1914 – January 12, 1916
- Preceded by: John N. Tabb
- Succeeded by: Myon E. Bristow
- In office January 8, 1908 – January 10, 1912
- Preceded by: James L. Taliaferro
- Succeeded by: John N. Tabb
- In office January 13, 1904 – January 10, 1906
- Preceded by: George Y. Hunley
- Succeeded by: James L. Taliaferro
- In office December 7, 1881 – December 5, 1883
- Preceded by: S. B. Chapman
- Succeeded by: Joshua F. Ross
- In office October 5, 1869 – December 6, 1871
- Preceded by: J. T. Seawell
- Succeeded by: Warner T. Jones

Member of the Virginia House of Delegates for Gloucester and Mathews
- In office December 1, 1897 – December 6, 1899
- Preceded by: John N. Tabb
- Succeeded by: George Y. Hunley

Member of the Virginia Senate from the 39th district
- In office December 2, 1885 – December 1, 1897
- Preceded by: Thomas J. Christian
- Succeeded by: Thomas E. Blakey

Personal details
- Born: James New Stubbs; October 17, 1839 Gloucester, Virginia, U.S.
- Died: April 10, 1919 (aged 79) Gloucester, Virginia, U.S.
- Party: Democratic
- Spouse: Eliza Medlicott
- Education: College of William & Mary; University of Virginia

Military service
- Allegiance: Confederate States
- Branch/service: Confederate States Army
- Years of service: 1861–1865
- Rank: Major
- Battles/wars: American Civil War

James New Stubbs (October 17, 1839 – April 10, 1919) was an American politician who served in the Virginia House of Delegates.
