= 2018 Virginia's 10th congressional district election =

- November 6, 2018

Virginia's 10th congressional district
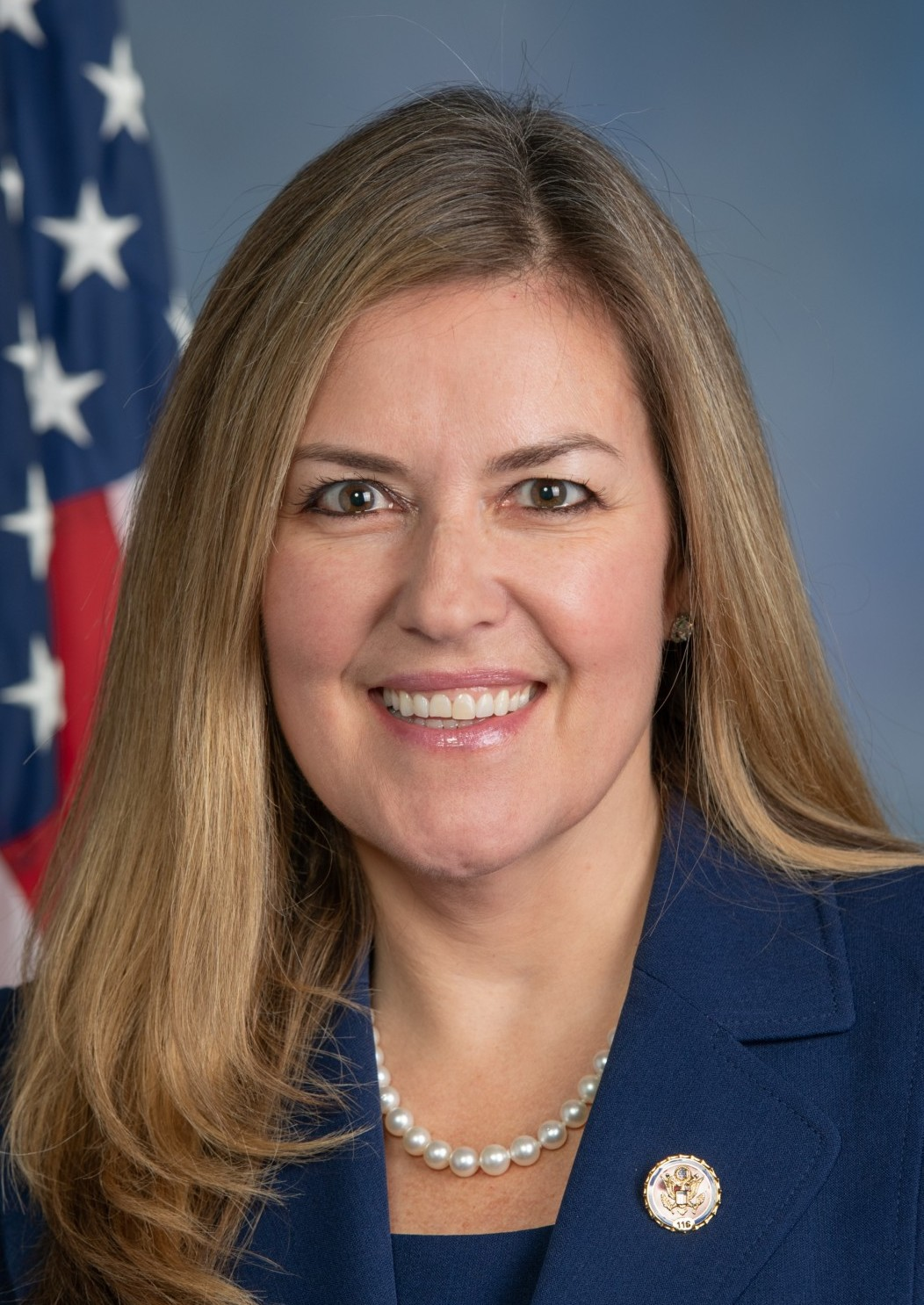

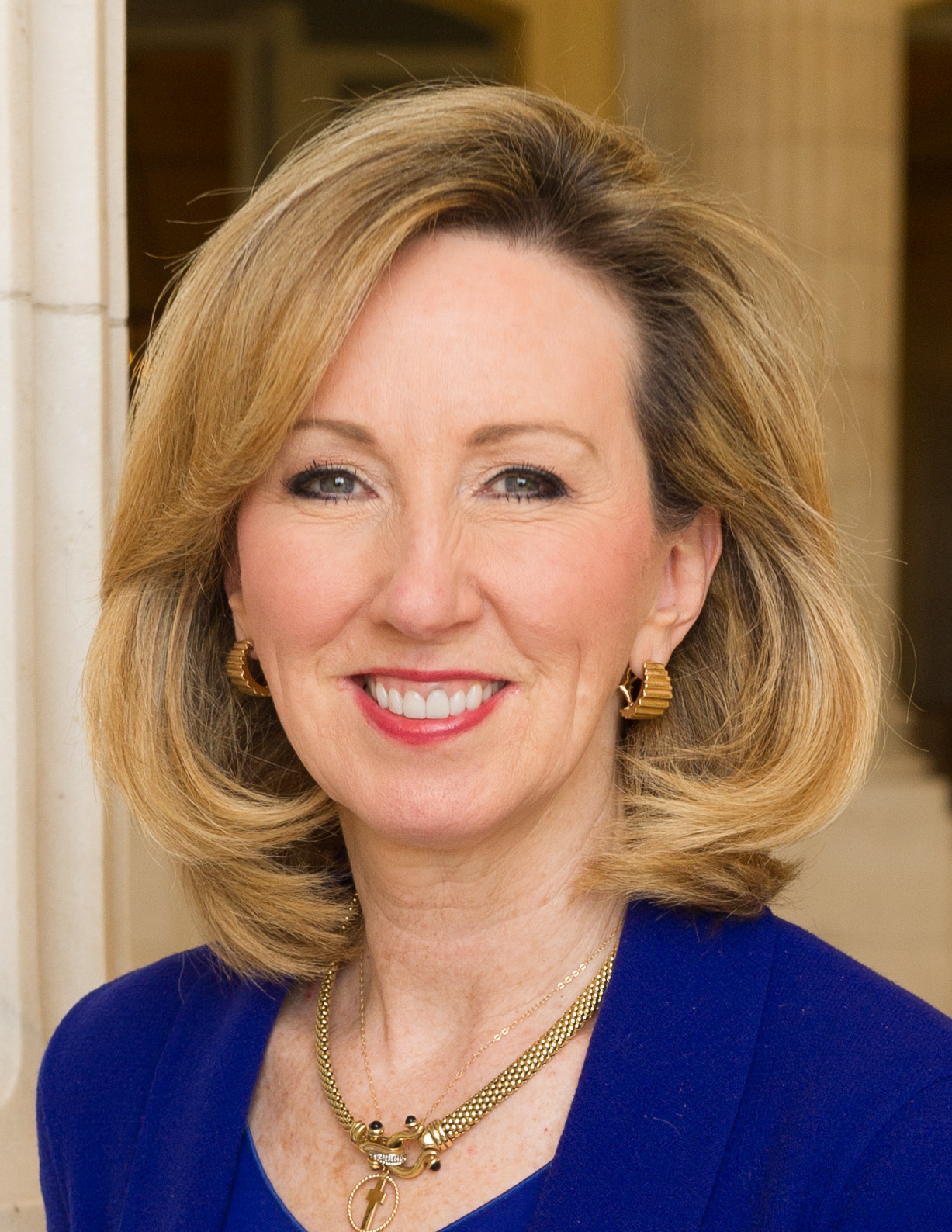
Candidate	Jennifer Wexton	Barbara Comstock
Party	Democratic	Republican
Popular vote	206,356	160,841
Percentage	56.1%	43.7%
- Wexton: 40–50% 50–60% 60–70% 70–80% Comstock: 50–60% 60–70% 70–80%
U.S. Representative before election
Barbara Comstock
Republican
Elected U.S. Representative
Jennifer Wexton
Democratic

Virginia's 10th congressional district election was one of the highest-profile United States House of Representatives elections of 2018, and the most competitive in Virginia. Republican incumbent Barbara Comstock lost re-election to a third term to Democrat Jennifer Wexton, a lawyer and state senator representing Loudoun County.

In the general election, held on November 6, 2018, the race was called relatively early in the night, with Wexton finishing with 56 percent of the vote to Comstock's 44 percent. Wexton's victory was described as illustrative of a "blue wave" in which Democrats won back the House majority that year and made gains in other offices across the country and as a repudiation of then-President Trump.

Comstock's loss was blamed on her association with then-President Trump, even as she emphasized her independence from him. Former state legislator David Ramadan, who is close to Comstock, blamed Trump for her loss, saying, "There's no other way to put it but that this is the fault of the moron in the White House." In preliminary results from a Washington Post-Schar School survey of voters in the 10th District, about 6 in 10 voters said Trump was one of the two most important factors in their vote.

Virginia's 10th District was one of the most expensive House races in the United States, with both campaigns spending a total of $11 million.

Comstock's loss meant that until the next voting cycle no Republicans would be representing the immediate Washington region. In the June 12, 2018 Republican primary election, Comstock defeated her rival, Air Force veteran Shak Hill. In the Democratic primary, Wexton defeated scientist Julia Biggins, former State Department official Alison Friedman, Army veteran Dan Helmer, former Department of Veterans Affairs official Lindsey Davis Stover, and former federal prosecutor Paul Pelletier.

== Background ==
Virginia's 10th congressional district has a higher median income than any other congressional district outside of Silicon Valley. The district is home to the Central Intelligence Agency and many of the country's biggest defense companies, IT firms, and government contractors. The 10th covers McLean and Manassas, and then stretches west from Loudoun to the West Virginia line. The 10th district is the most college-educated GOP-held district in the country, and 37 percent of its residents are non-white. Only five congressional districts have more federal workers than the 10th, and all are within Virginia, Maryland or the District.

Ever since 17-term Republican Rep. Frank Wolf's retirement, Democrats had seen the 10th district as ripe for a challenge, but Comstock had won by solid margins since her first run in 2014, when she rode a solid advantage in fundraising to the victory over Fairfax County supervisor John Foust. In 2016, Comstock's challenger, Democrat LuAnn Bennett, became the first 10th District Democrat to win in Loudoun since 1978, but Comstock still won with 210,791 (52.7 percent) to Bennett's 187,712 votes (46.9 percent) of the ballots cast. The 10th district is one of 23 districts across the country that split their ticket in 2016 by voting for Democrat Hillary Clinton for president and a Republican for representative.

Virginia was one of at least 13 congressional races in 2018 in which the Democratic challenger raised over $1 million in the second quarter. VCU politics professor Ravi Perry points out that Comstock's fundraising edge was in contrast to the situation in Virginia's 2nd, 5th, and 7th districts, where Democrats out-fundraised their opponents in the second quarter: "They're aware of the swing district nature of it, and are clearly investing in it accordingly."

After 2018 Ohio's 12th congressional district special election, Fox commentator Chad Pergram noted that like Virginia's 10th district, Ohio's 12th congressional district had suburban areas (Franklin County, Ohio) where Democrats dominated and rural areas (Delaware County, Ohio) where they did not: "Democrats need to extend their reach to the distant suburbs in order to get somewhere this fall." In the rural parts of the 10th district, there was some concern that the 2018 China–United States trade war and the Trump tariffs on steel and aluminum, along with anti-immigrant rhetoric and policies that make it harder to find migrant workers, could reduce the profitability of agricultural businesses. According to Mark Rozell, dean of George Mason University's Schar School of Policy and Government, "They may think Comstock has done a good job, she has represented the district well, she does great constituent services, she shows up everywhere to every local event, and for some of these voters none of that matters. The bigger issue is sending that message about the current direction of the Trump administration."

=== National significance ===
Democrats had to pick up at least an additional 24 seats in the 2018 House elections to win back the majority they lost in the 2010 election. This effort was focused on defending Democratic seats while picking up Republican seats, especially in races that were tossups or where the districts leaned Democratic. In a "blue wave" election, which saw Democrats win back the House majority and make significant gains in other offices across the country, many Republican incumbents were voted out, Republican politicians retired in record numbers, but Comstock had opted to fight for her seat. Democratic Rep. Don Beyer said that in Virginia, Comstock would be "the No. 1 target – we're going to put everyone behind it."

Comstock had been described, by the numbers, as arguably the most vulnerable Republican House member. This was partly because northern Virginia has become increasingly Democratic. In the 2017 Virginia House of Delegates election, seven of the eight Republican incumbents in the state legislature with districts touching Comstock's were defeated by Democrats. Among other reasons for Democrats' optimism about winning the election were that Democrat Hillary Clinton defeated Republican Donald Trump by 10 points in the 10th district in the 2016 United States presidential election, and Democrat Ralph Northam won in the 10th district by a 13 percent margin in the 2017 Virginia gubernatorial election. Democrats believed Comstock would be defeated by Democratic voters bent on defeating anyone who shared a party affiliation with Trump.

Comstock, however, won by 6 points in 2016, despite the Republican presidential ticket's loss in her district. She had said that the 2017 election results did not change her plans for the 2018 election, because in her view, listening to the voters of the district and focusing on the district's priorities were what were important. In addition to the fact that Comstock was at first a proven winner in districts bluer than the national average, another challenge Democrats faced in unseating her was that the D.C. media market was one of the most expensive in the country, and reached many people who did not live in the district. This made it necessary to raise large amounts of money, including from outside groups.

Wasserman noted that "several Republicans privately express doubts about spending millions on expensive DC television trying to save this seat when there are far cheaper routes to holding the majority." According to Washington Post reporter Jenna Portnoy, in April 2018, "Experts say Comstock will be tough to beat given her strong name recognition, relentless campaign style and embrace of some moderate positions that polls show resonate with voters in the closest thing Virginia has to a swing district." Comstock is also renowned for her political smarts.

According to Comstock's political director Ken Nunnenkamp, "Democrats have spent over $20 million trying to defeat her and they have a 0-5 record to show for it," and he cautioned against underestimating her. He said, "Those failed campaigns have also had one thing in common – the bitter partisan advice of Kathleen Murphy," who lost a 2013 House of Delegates race to Comstock and then won a 2015 special election after Comstock resigned.

For the second election cycle in a row, Comstock was on the National Republican Congressional Committee Patriot Program list of vulnerable House members who would receive additional financial and strategic support for their races. The NRCC made its largest reservation for television advertising time, $6.4 million, for Comstock in the expensive Washington media market. The race was expected to be one of the most competitive, and costly, congressional races nationwide.

The Wall Street Journal noted that then-President Trump, by threatening a government shutdown, could be purposefully putting Republican House members like Comstock at risk of defeat, so that in the 2020 United States presidential election, he could use Democratic House Speaker Nancy Pelosi as a foil.

According to Jake Kastan, although the party that controls the White House typically loses, on average, 32 seats in the first midterm election, Republican incumbents like Comstock had many advantages, including more money and resilient local brands. He drew several distinctions between the 2018 election and the 2010 Republican wave election, noting that 57 percent of Americans said things are going well in the U.S. today, the largest proportion to share these sentiments since January 2007. He also noted that House Republicans had unveiled a "Better Off Now" message that makes the connection between GOP policies and record low unemployment, a surging economy, higher take-home pay, and a strengthened military. And he pointed out that even if Republican incumbents like Comstock did lose, it may not win Democrats the House, since Republicans were said to be favored in many districts with open seats, and there were only nine Republicans in the House representing districts that tilt Democratic.

== Primaries ==
As of April, Comstock had posted one of the largest fundraising hauls of the first quarter of 2018, and four separate Democrats in the district had posted fundraising hauls of more than $200,000. The fact that the field of six Democrats raised more than $4.4 million combined for the Democratic primary was seen as a sign of Democratic enthusiasm. The 10th district race also drew in the most money in the state in the second quarter.

As of May 2018, ahead of primary voting, Roll Call listed Comstock as one of only three incumbents running in districts rated as tossups. After the primary election, the Cook Political Report moved the district (along with four other districts) from "Toss Up" to "Lean Democratic," noting Comstock's underwhelming performance against Hill, including in the Shenandoah Valley, and the possibility that Republican senatorial candidate Corey Stewart's nomination could "alienate independents, depress Republican interest in the Senate race and allow Kaine to run up the score in the 10th CD, compounding Comstock's challenge." In particular, Stewart's stances on Confederate monuments and immigration may have lowered turnout among educated suburban Republicans.

The University of Virginia Center for Politics made a similar assessment. According to Mark J. Rozell, it seems likely that Comstock's appeals to mainstream and independent voters would be overshadowed by Trump's and Stewart's louder rhetoric directed to the hard-core right wing. A study by the Christopher Newport University Wason Center for Civic Leadership's Rachel Bitecofer predicted Comstock would lose and that the deciding factor for Democrats was getting their own partisans to the polls rather than swaying independent voters. Comstock herself had said, "We're up in our internal polls, and I have never underperformed my internal polls."

=== Democratic ===
==== Candidates ====
===== Julia Biggins =====
Julia Biggins is a graduate of Baylor College of Medicine and the University of Illinois at Urbana–Champaign and an assistant director of antiviral research at Integrated BioTherapeutics Inc. Issues she has focused on include renewable energy, climate change, Deferred Action for Childhood Arrivals expansion, LGBTQ rights, and HIV research funding. She has described Comstock as an "anti-science Congresswoman" and she said, "One of the first things we saw the Trump administration do was to prevent the Environmental Protection Agency and Department of Agriculture from sharing data with the public, which any scientist will tell you is a big red flag." Biggins also commented that in all her years of dealing with infectious and dangerous diseases, she has "never seen a disease like what is running through our Congress right now." Specifically, she views the "professional political class" and the influence of money in politics as the biggest single issue facing Washington.

===== Alison Friedman =====
Alison Friedman interned at Feminist Majority during college, then became a legislative and program coordinator for People for the American Way, and subsequently worked for Congresswoman Jane Harman and co-founded a nonprofit, the Alliance to Stop Slavery and End Trafficking (ASSET), to fight human trafficking. She helped to write the California Consumer Transparency Act and served as a senior State Department official in the Obama Administration, continuing her work against human trafficking. Specifically, she was deputy director for the Office to Monitor and Combat Trafficking in Persons and later helped establish a public-private partnership known as the Global Fund to End Slavery. Friedman argues, "We need to re-staff the State Department, support and lift up our dedicated federal workers" especially in the intelligence and diplomatic agencies. Friedman had the first television ad of the campaign season, "Lockdown," which portrays parents receiving emails from their children's schools alerting them of lockdowns and outlines Friedman's support for expanding background checks, banning assault weapons and closing the gun show loophole. The U.S. Chamber of Commerce aired an ad touting Comstock's support for transportation projects and the military, while pointing out that she's "not with the partisan bomb-throwers".

===== Dan Helmer =====
Dan Helmer is a graduate of the United States Military Academy, a U.S. Army veteran of the wars in Iraq and Afghanistan and a Rhodes Scholar. Helmer was employed as a business strategist at the Boston Consulting Group and continued his military service in the Army Reserves, where he was selected in 2017 for promotion to lieutenant colonel.

Of the candidates, Helmer had spent the most time in the national spotlight for his sometimes-provocative TV spots, which led to his sparring with hosts on the conservative talk show Fox & Friends. An online-only campaign video entitled "Helmer Zone" unexpectedly went viral in September 2017, climbing to number four on the YouTube trending list within 24 hours. Reactions to the video, in which Helmer spoofed the film Top Gun, complete with offkey singing, were mixed. As the Daily Beast noted, "The internet quickly dubbed it one of the worst campaign ads of all time. But Helmer's eyeball-gouging chorus never leaves your head.... which seems to be the point."

===== Paul Pelletier =====
Paul Pelletier served as a police officer, attended law school, had two judicial clerkships, and became a federal prosecutor, serving in the United States Department of Justice Tax Division and then becoming an Assistant U.S. Attorney in the Miami office of the United States Attorney for the Southern District of Florida. In 1997, he transitioned to tackling white-collar crime and healthcare fraud when he became chief of Miami's economic crimes section. When the Enron scandal broke, the Justice Department brought him to Washington, D.C., to help its criminal division fight accounting fraud. He served on the federal task force that led the corruption case against lobbyist Jack Abramoff as well as officials in Congress and the White House, including U.S. Reps. Robert Ney and William J. Jefferson. Pelletier moved to the 10th district in 2017 specifically to run against Comstock.

===== Lindsey Stover =====
Lindsey Stover is a graduate of Harvard University Kennedy School of Government and owner of Edwards, Davis Stover and Associates, a small communications firm that works with veteran-owned small businesses and companies. She is a communications strategist, former Obama administration official, and first-time candidate who announced her candidacy in April 2017. Stover argued that she was the only primary candidate with extensive, senior-level federal legislative experience, having brokered compromises in Congress to pass bills and briefed President Obama in the Situation Room. She spoke about being raised by a single mother and working her way through college.

===== Jennifer Wexton =====
Jennifer Wexton was educated at the University of Maryland and the William & Mary Law School. She was currently a state senator. She was encouraged to run for the U.S. House seat by national Democratic leaders. Richard L. Saslaw said that "Wexton, from an ideological standpoint, is a perfect fit for that district" because "She's a liberal but not to the point where it's going to scare off the slightly moderate to conservative voters." Her state senate district included much of the northeastern portion of the congressional district.

==== Campaign ====
The 10th Congressional District Democratic Committee unanimously opted to hold a state-run open primary. The six Democratic candidates who turned in enough signatures to be placed on the primary ballot are scientist Julia Biggins, former State Department official Alison Friedman, state senator Jennifer Wexton, Army veteran Dan Helmer, former Department of Veterans Affairs official Lindsey Davis Stover, and former federal prosecutor Paul Pelletier. As of April 2018, Friedman led the group in campaign fundraising. Wexton came in second in fundraising and was endorsed by Governor Ralph Northam and Representatives Gerald E. Connolly and A. Donald McEachin. Wexton, the only elected official in the field, had the highest name recognition. Political scientist Stephen Farnsworth remarked, "If you're not Senator Wexton, your big challenge is to be heard at all," which he says made it worthwhile for her rivals to attack her so they can stand out from the field.

The Democratic primary in the 10th district was seen as exemplifying the internecine fights in 2018's crowded Democratic primaries. Some observers noted that because Comstock's vulnerability attracted a number of Democrats to run against her, there was a possibility that Democratic infighting could leave the eventual nominee too bruised and battered to win against Comstock. The Democratic veterans group VoteVets backed Helmer, while state legislators supported state Wexton, and Stover and Friedman, both former Barack Obama administration officials, tapped those networks for help.

Wexton had been viewed as the frontrunner to win the Democratic primary because she represented about half of the largest county, Loudoun, in the 10th district, and because she had gained the endorsements of many of Virginia's Democratic politicians. On the other hand, in fundraising, she fell short of Friedman's totals and barely edged out Helmer and Stover. Also, the results of recent elections, such as the 2017 Democratic gubernatorial primary, suggested that Virginia voters, especially those from Loudoun, might prefer candidates from outside the Establishment. Biggins and Helmer in particular positioned themselves as political outsiders with drastically different experience and backgrounds from Comstock. The proximity of Virginia's 10th District to D.C. limited the reach of outsider candidacies, although the concentration of government workers and contractors is not as high as it is in, say, Fairfax.

In late May, Wexton narrated an ad in which she rode in a truck, featuring a "Change is coming" banner, from the 10th district to the White House. VoteVets aired the ad, "Life or Death," on Helmer's behalf from May 30 through June 5. Helmer also ran an ad comparing Trump to Osama bin Laden, which White House deputy press secretary Raj Shah called "nothing short of reprehensible" and Comstock called an "outrageous and offensive thing to say, and beyond the pale". Garren Shipley, a Virginia spokesman for the Republican National Committee, said, "His ad is a clear reminder to voters in Virginia that the Democrat base is consumed by anger and hatred."

Wexton was targeted by fellow Democrats over her willingness to compromise on gun control and for her refusal to forgo corporate donations. Helmer and Friedman said her past acceptance of Dominion Energy and other corporate PAC money, and her unwillingness to pledge not to take corporate PAC money in the future, prevent her from creating enough of a contrast with Comstock. Friedman and Stover fought for the same pool of undecided voters, and Cook Political Report remarked that if Wexton is "able to run up the score in her own Loudoun County-based state senate district, it'll probably be enough to win a low turnout race."

Stover was the only primary candidate to open an office in Winchester, and she performed well in Winchester and Frederick and Clarke counties, taking 49.91 percent (798 ballots) of the vote in the city, 41.91 percent (1,441) of the vote in Frederick County, and 48.93 percent (525) of the vote in Clarke County. Frank Bruni described Wexton's primary victory as "precisely what Republican strategists didn't want, and at the beginning of the year, they chattered hopefully about Wexton's being thwarted by more strident Democratic rivals to her left. But she beat the second-place finisher by almost 20 points."

Results by county/independent city Wexton: 30–40%; 40–50%; Davis Stover: 20–30%; 30–40%; 40–50%

2018 US House election: Virginia District 10 Democratic primary
Party	Candidate	Votes	%
Democratic	Jennifer T. Wexton	22,394	41.88
Democratic	Alison K. Friedman	12,289	22.98
Democratic	Lindsey Davis Stover	8,561	16.01
Democratic	Dan I. Helmer	6,709	12.55
Democratic	Paul E. Pelletier	2,010	3.76
Democratic	Julia E. Biggins	1,512	2.83
Turnout		53,475	100

=== Republican ===
==== Candidates ====
===== Barbara Comstock =====
Comstock is a Georgetown University-educated lawyer who interned for her home state Senator Edward Kennedy during the presidency of Ronald Reagan, when she became a Republican. She worked on Frank Wolf's staff before making her reputation as an opposition researcher on Clinton administration scandals such as the Whitewater controversy, Filegate, Travelgate, and the Clinton–Lewinsky scandal and then working for the U.S. Department of Justice.

===== Shak Hill =====
Shak Hill is a decorated Air Force combat veteran who graduated from the U.S. Air Force Academy, obtained an M.B.A. from Western New England University, and served in the U.S. Air Force in the Presidential Wing, based at Andrews Air Force Base in Maryland. A former elected official, he sought to unseat Senator Mark Warner in 2014 but did not win the Republican nomination. Hill believes that religion is essential to the country's well-being, arguing that the founders were Christians who "believed generally in a moral society, and that moral society has allowed us to flourish, unquestionably". He has criticized welfare programs that he says tell men that their fatherhood role is irrelevant, and attributed the rise in school shootings to the decline of two-parent households. He also blamed the school shootings on a "culture of death" brought about by abortion-on-demand.

Hill said that what triggered his decision to run for the seat was Comstock's vote against an amendment that would have barred the Pentagon from paying for gender transition surgeries or hormone therapy for transgender service members. He described Comstock as a rabid Never Trumper" and member of "the swamp" looking to buy today's votes with our grandchildren's money." Comstock described Hill as a "perennial failed candidate".

==== Campaign ====
Comstock faced a long-shot challenge in the primary from former combat pilot Shak Hill, who ran unsuccessfully for the Republican nomination in the 2014 United States Senate election in Virginia. Hill hired Stewart's campaign manager, and some experts said that Hill embodied the possibility that Comstock's efforts to appeal to centrists in the most populated areas of her district could cost her conservative votes. In April 2018, Comstock's campaign created a site, "ShadyShak.com," attacking Hill's personal and professional life. Comstock sent out mailers boasting of being "pro-border wall to stop illegal immigration", "pro-life" and "pro-2nd Amendment." Hill complained that he was unfairly attacked by a conservative media outlet friendly to Comstock after a website he runs uploaded articles about penis enlargement without his knowledge. Sebastian Gorka appeared at a May 31 rally for Hill. Comstock was criticized for declining to participate in, or send a surrogate in her place to, candidate forums attended by all the other candidates. While Comstock was heavily favored in the primary, she did hit back against Hill in ads to minimize the risk of an upset.

Larry Sabato described Comstock's margin of victory against Hill, whom he called "a right-wing fringe candidate" as "a very poor showing". Jennifer Rubin noted, "The total Democratic primary vote (about 53,800) comfortably exceeded the GOP total vote (about 46,000); Comstock in her two-person contest got not even 6,000 votes more than Wexton in her six-person race."

A Vox article noted that Comstock, like Martha Roby and Mark Sanford, was punished in the Republican primary for her criticism of Trump.

Results by county/independent city Comstock: 50–60%; 60–70%; Hill: 50–60%

2018 US House election: Virginia District 10 Republican primary
Party	Candidate	Votes	%
Republican	Barbara J. Comstock	28,274	60.71
Republican	Shak E. Hill	18,301	39.29
Turnout		46,575	100

== Other candidates ==
=== Nathan Larson (Independent) ===
Independent Nathan Larson filed paperwork on May 2 to enter the race, and ran on a "patriarchist libertarian" platform. Early drafts of a campaign manifesto by Larson suggested that his major campaign issues would include stopping the federal war on drugs, protecting gun ownership rights, and curtailing foreign interventions by the United States. Larson withdrew from the race on August 13, 2018, and endorsed Wexton, calling her "the accelerationist choice"; Wexton, through a spokesman, declined the endorsement. Comstock tweeted, "It is good news for all voters in the 10th District that Nathan Larson, a convicted felon who served time in prison for threatening to kill the president and is an admitted pedophile, an admitted rapist, white supremacist, and misogynist, is now off the ballot in the 10th Congressional District."

=== Others ===
Fairfax teachers union president Kimberly Adams, Loudoun School for the Gifted founder Deep Sran, financial consultant Michael Pomerleano, wounded veterans advocate Julien Modica, general practitioner Shadi Ayyas, and retired Naval intelligence officer David Hanson filed paperwork to compete in the Democratic primary. However, all of them did not submit enough signatures to get on the ballot.

== General election ==
Wexton was endorsed by former U.S. President Barack Obama, Gerry Connolly, Donald McEachin and others. On the eve of the general election, Obama made a surprise visit to Fairfax to join a rally for Wexton and Tim Kaine.

Sean Schofield, a 44-year-old computer programmer from Silver Spring, and Abbey Ruby, a 34-year-old lawyer from McLean, founded Dump Comstock, a group that was devoted to embarrassing and attacking Comstock through electronic ambushes caught on video, mobile electronic billboards, social media, and their website. Dump Comstock worked with other groups seeking to unseat Comstock, including Planned Parenthood, the Service Employees International Union, and Indivisible.

Tom Steyer had plans to spend at least $2 million to try to unseat Barbara Comstock and Scott Taylor through his organization, NextGen America. Wexton also received phone and text bank and postcard and door-knocking support from the Arlington County Democratic Committee.

At a meeting of the Winchester-Frederick County Democratic Committee, Wexton said she was paying attention to Winchester, Frederick and Clarke counties, even though they are less affluent and less populous than Loudoun, explaining, "For too long Democrats have let the western part of the district go". She said her campaign approach is deliberately moderate to fit the district.

Comstock had received high ratings from the NRA and ranked 10th among House members who had received the most in donations from the group.

Comstock's support for the Federal Employees Paid Parental Leave Act and break with the Donald Trump administration over the federal hiring freeze had helped her reputation as an ally of federal workers, many of whom lived in her district. She had also focused on pay raises for public servants and expanding job opportunities for veterans. She had also praised the military budget increases in the Consolidated Appropriations Act, 2018 as a win for defense contractors and Pentagon employees in her district, and authored legislation to combat the opioid epidemic and MS-13 gang problem that had sprouted in some Northern Virginia neighborhoods. She had spoken out against illegal drugs crossing the border and in May participated in an event with the two DEA agents who caught drug lord Pablo Escobar and were featured in Narcos. She portrayed some of her well-funded Democratic opponents as carpetbaggers who were out of touch with the district and too leftist to represent it.

Wexton accused Comstock of fearmongering and race-baiting for pushing legislation that would allow the federal government to deport immigrants on the suspicion of gang activity and fund anti-gang task forces. She said, "For Barbara Comstock, the Latino community is nothing more than MS-13." A Comstock campaign spokeswoman said, "Wexton’s outrageous statements show how out-of-touch she is with the violent MS-13 gang threat and the victims they brutally target."

Comstock's voting record, including on the 2017 tax reform bill, has usually been aligned with Trump, but she distanced herself from him by calling his behavior in the Donald Trump Access Hollywood tape so "disgusting" and "vile" as to warrant dropping out of the presidential election, and opposing a hypothetical shutdown over immigration laws. Comstock also said that she could not defend Trump's reported comments calling Haiti, El Salvador and African nations "shithole countries." Comstock also praised the appointment of former FBI director Robert Mueller as Special Counsel in the investigation into Russian interference in the 2016 United States elections.

In addition, Comstock was one of the few Republicans given a pass from the Republican leadership to vote against the American Health Care Act of 2017, also known as TrumpCare. Comstock stated her opposition was due to her concern over some of its provisions, in particular one that would allow states to let insurers again charge more to customers with preexisting medical problems, while conservative blogger Jim Hoeft suggested that her decision was an attempt to walk a fine line in a district where elections are becoming more favorable to Democrats. Wexton was not yet in favor of moving forward with impeachment, saying she wanted to collect facts and evidence first, although she said, "The biggest problem facing those in VA-10 is President Trump, and Barbara Comstock's refusal to stand up to him."

In a May telephone interview, Comstock noted Trump's achievements, including the 2018 North Korea–United States summit, the release of three Korean American detainees held by the North, his stepback from the Iranian nuclear deal, the new U.S. embassy in Jerusalem, and his economic initiatives that have put the economy on a forward pace.

Comstock had been criticized by Democrats for declining to hold town halls where constituents could dialog with her in an unscripted public forum. Stover said that it shows a lack of courage. Republican former Rep. Tom Davis has suggested Comstock change the practice, arguing, "You’ve got to let people scream at you a little bit, let them get it off their chest." In response to the complaints about her lack of town halls, Comstock's office said that she had met with hundreds of constituents in her offices and connected with 9000 during telephone town halls, and that "she is ever present in and around her district". David Ramadan, a former state lawmaker, predicted that Comstock would be "one of the very few Republicans that will make it out of November despite the anti-G.O.P. national wave" and would survive "because of the relationships she built with minority constituencies in the district, Indians, Muslims, Koreans".

Wexton thought that the country should be evolving toward a single-payer health care system. She cited the Dulles Greenway's high tolls as an example of what happens with privatized infrastructure. Comstock spent most of 2017 working on legislation to reform the Metro train and bus system that serves the Washington region, but Democrats criticized her 2013 vote against Metro funding when she represented Virginia's 34th House of Delegates district. Comstock promised to push for more transportation funding to flow to the area.

Although Comstock mentioned the benefits of the tax cuts 36 times in January in social media, she did so only 13 times in March and then 22 times in April, and said in an interview that she was reacting to constituents, whose interests have moved on to other issues. Her support for the tax bill was a possible vulnerability in an affluent district where many voters claim state and local tax deductions.

Wexton stated her support for decriminalizing cannabis, while Comstock had voted against cannabis law reform legislation.

With regard to the Trump administration family separation policy, Comstock said she wanted to find a bipartisan solution to separating families while still making sure the border is secure. Wexton criticized Comstock's statement in a tweet, saying, "POTUS can end this awful policy today, but by lacking the courage to demand that, she supports these innocent children being used as political pawns." Democrats plan to make family separation a big issue in the election.

Wexton referred to the joint press conference between Trump and Russian President Vladimir Putin at the 2018 Russia–United States Summit as the "surrender summit".

In August, Trump scrapped pay raises for federal civilian employees, a decision opposed by Comstock, a move that some commentators at the time suggested could imperil her reelection hopes, given the heavy concentration of federal employees in her district.

In September, Gabrielle Giffords launched a $1 million cable television advertising campaign targeting Comstock. Comstock responded by emphasizing her support for improving background checks as well as the STOP School Violence Act.

=== Fundraising ===
In April, Democrat Friedman reported cash on hand of $817,631; Wexton reported $630,707; Helmer reported $516,146; Stover reported $471,956; and Pelletier reported $191,294. Republican primary challenger Shak Hill reported $63,401. In May, Friedman gave her campaign $1 million of her own money to help pay for television ads, saying this would help her compete with candidates like Wexton "who benefited from corporate money from big tobacco and oil companies without being beholden to their special interests".

Friedman's donors included actress Jennifer Garner; singer Barbra Streisand; Alexander Soros, son of the liberal billionaire donor George Soros; Peter Getty; Donna Brazile, former head of the Democratic National Committee; singer Graham Nash; singer Bonnie Raitt; and Eleanor Smeal, president of the Feminist Majority Foundation. A controversial donation of more than $160,000 to Friedman came from Defeat Slavery, whose donors were not disclosed prior to the primary election.

In this race with national focus, money poured in for each candidate. Comstock and Wexton raised nearly $5.4 million, with Wexton slightly ahead. Outside spending also flooded the district — $5.9 million on behalf of Wexton and about $5.5 million on behalf of Comstock, according to the Center for Responsive Politics. By mid-October, Democrats were so confident that Comstock would lose that in mid-October the party's campaign committee canceled nearly $1 million worth of advertising it had reserved for Wexton, redirecting it to other Democratic races.

Comstock's donors included Michael Chertoff, head of the U.S. Department of Homeland Security under President George W. Bush; Todd Stottlemyer, chief executive of the Inova Center for Personalized Health, and his wife; former Mississippi governor Haley Barbour; Ed Gillespie's campaign committee; and Carly Fiorina. Wexton is one of 19 candidates to whom Hillary Clinton made the maximum donation of $5,000. Wexton says that she had not taken any political action committee money in the election and would not take any Dominion Energy money. She responded to criticism of her taking money from Dominion during her state senate races by saying that the donations did not influence her voting.

Comstock's donors included Home Depot co-founder Ken Langone and his wife, Elaine; the Susan B. Anthony List; the National Shooting Sports Foundation; Dominion Energy; and American and United Airlines. Wexton's donors included the United Food and Commercial Workers and the United Transportation Union, the Common Ground PAC, J Street PAC, the League of Conservation Voters, the New Democrat Coalition, and Progressive Choices PAC.

=== Polling ===
Poll source	Date(s) administered	Sample size	Margin of error	Barbara Comstock (R)	Jennifer Wexton (D)	Other	Undecided
NYT Upshot/Siena College	October 11–15, 2018	484	± 4.8%	41%	48%	–	11%
McLaughlin & Associates (R-Comstock)	October 6–8, 2018	400	± 4.9%	48%	47%	–	5%
Washington Post/Schar School	September 19 – October 5, 2018	866	± 4.0%	43%	55%	–	2%
Christopher Newport University	September 23 – October 2, 2018	794	± 4.1%	44%	51%	–	5%
Monmouth University	September 26–30, 2018	374	± 5.1%	44%	50%	<1%	5%
Monmouth University	June 21–24, 2018	338 LV	± 5.3%	41%	50%	3%	6%
Monmouth University	June 21–24, 2018	400 RV	± 4.9%	39%	49%	2%	10%
DCCC (D)	March 20–21, 2018	400	–	43%	46%	–	–

Hypothetical polling

Poll source	Date(s) administered	Sample size	Margin of error	Barbara Comstock (R)	"Democratic opponent"	Other	Undecided
Public Policy Polling (D)	October 4–7, 2017	669	± 3.8%	39%	48%	—	13%

=== Endorsements ===
On May 30, Wexton received the Washington Post's much-coveted endorsement, which argued the case that Wexton was "best qualified and also the one most likely to chip away at partisan gridlock in Washington" and that she was a candidate who "can win a tough election and then rack up genuine accomplishments while remaining true to progressive values". According to Cook, "Northern Virginia Democratic primaries are one of the few remaining venues where the Post's editorial opinion still counts for something." On election day, former FBI director James Comey offered to knock on doors to canvass for Wexton.

In the final days of the campaign, Vice President Mike Pence recorded a phone message urging voters to cast ballots for Comstock.

=== Issues ===
Comstock's Democratic challengers focused on the issue of gun control, prompted by the district's increasing population of college-educated white-collar workers and suburbanites' changing attitudes in the wake of the Stoneman Douglas High School shooting. At an April 10 candidate forum, Democratic candidates described gun control methods they would support, agreeing to ban assault weapons and high-capacity magazines and implement universal background checks. Helmer and Stover criticized Wexton's support of a legislative compromise supporting concealed carry reciprocity with other states in exchange for stiffening penalties for domestic abusers caught with guns and mandating that state police perform background checks for private transactions at gun shows. Wexton defended the compromise as having improved public safety by resulting in felony charges for 60 people under the domestic violence gun ban. Biggins proposed an Australian-style gun buyback program.

In May, Helmer went to a gun show in Chantilly and demonstrated how it was possible to buy what he described as "the same gun, same magazine I had in Afghanistan" in under 10 minutes, without any background check. Pelletier pivoted off of his Justice Department credentials by demanding a criminal investigation into links between the National Rifle Association, US-sanctioned Russians and Donald Trump's 2016 presidential campaign. According to Roll Call's Patricia Murphy, Comstock's challengers were digging into the gun control issue because they know it had become a voting issue for gun control advocates, especially women.

Stover pointed out that Comstock stated her opposition to TrumpCare when it looked as if it would fail: "Her decision was made when the fate of the bill was already sealed. I don't believe that's courage — that's politics, and that's exactly what people are sick of." More generally, Comstock's Democratic opponents claim that she often speaks like them but almost always votes like a Republican.

All five Democrats who participated in a May 14 debate (that is, all the Democratic candidates except Wexton, who was attending a state senate special session) said they think Trump is unfit for office, with Helmer saying, "After 9/11, the worst threat to our democracy lived in a cave. Now he lives in the White House. I'm ready to vote to impeach him to defend democracy." Stover likewise was in favor of moving forward with impeachment proceedings, although she says she wants to make sure the case is "airtight" before charges are brought in Congress. Friedman also said she was not yet ready to move forward with impeachment, although she wants Trump out of office. Biggins too wanted the investigation to run its course before she supported impeachment. Pelletier says he is in favor of moving forward with impeachment proceedings and that he wants Trump to be accountable for his actions.

Friedman had previously called Trump "the embodiment of abuses of power" and said, regarding sexual harassment, "I'm glad Barbara Comstock has been talking about this issue. But I think her commitment would be more meaningful if she was working as hard to hold the president accountable for his sexual assault."

The Democrats differed on how to improve Obamacare, with Helmer advocating replacing it with Medicare for all, and Biggins favoring single-payer healthcare. Stover favored a single-payer system as well, and said that she'd also like to look at a Medicare-for-all system as well as other proposals for a system that could not be undermined by a future administration. Friedman favored improving the Affordable Care Act. Hill attacked Comstock's vote against an Obamacare repeal bill, saying it was a "fantastically disappointing violation of her campaign promise to us".

On transportation, Biggins cited a permanent funding mechanism for Metro, Virginia Railway Express to places like Winchester and Berryville, and light rail and buses as ways to help deal with infrastructure problems. Pelletier blamed the Republican tax reform law for leaving no money to fix 10th district transportation problems and Helmer blamed special interests for impeding transportation solutions.

Friedman criticized the Tax Reform Act for benefiting corporations and the wealthy above working families, singles, and those in most need, and Helmer called for a complete rewrite of the legislation. Biggins proposed countering the Tax Reform Act by tightening up some military spending, saying, "We have many redundancies there that could be streamlined a bit." As a result of Comstock's support of the tax bill, the National Association of Manufacturers put on an event with Comstock in April in a rural part of her district featuring George Allen praising Comstock's efforts in Congress.

Hill claimed that Trump's tax plan supports working families, and that companies are repatriating to the United States and reinvesting in their businesses, creating more employment opportunities. He also points to deregulation under Trump as creating wealth, boosting the stock market. Pelletier criticized Trump's elimination of revenue that could have gone to working on eroding infrastructure. Both Biggins and Stover want to raise the minimum wage to $15/hour.

Stover called Republicans' immigration bans and reforms and the proposed Border Wall "heartless and bad economic decisions" and described the wall as "a symbol of hate". Helmer said Comstock's comments likening the tracking of immigrants entering the country to tracking FedEx packages were reasons to run against her, and said, "All my time in Iraq and Afghanistan, I never thought we were fighting to deport children." Friedman also criticized Comstock's FedEx package comparison, saying it did not respect human dignity. Hill argued that Comstock had not been vocal enough in her support of Trump's immigration policies. Hill supports building a border wall and ending the concept of anchor babies.

Hill supported leaving intrastate cannabis policy to individual states to decide, while all six Democratic candidates favor decriminalizing cannabis, and Helmer advocated legalizing it entirely. Hill said that keeping families together would reduce crime rates, while Friedman said, "I have to say, as a single mom, I think there are more important things we can do related to criminal justice reform." She called for implicit bias training for law enforcement and community policing, and echoed other candidates’ calls for bail and sentencing overhauls.

==== Predictions ====
Source	Ranking	As of
The Cook Political Report	Lean D (flip)	November 5, 2018
Inside Elections	Tilt D (flip)	November 5, 2018
Sabato's Crystal Ball	Lean D (flip)	November 5, 2018
RCP	Lean D (flip)	November 5, 2018

==== Results ====
Virginia's 10th congressional district, 2018
Party	Candidate	Votes	%
Democratic	Jennifer Wexton	206,356	56.1
Republican	Barbara Comstock (incumbent)	160,841	43.7
Write-in		598	0.2
Total votes		367,795	100.0
Democratic gain from Republican			

==== By county and independent city ====
Locality	Jennifer Wexton Democratic		Barbara Comstock Republican		Write-in Various		Margin		Total votes cast
Locality	#	%	#	%	#	%	#	%	Total votes cast
Clarke	3,037	42.2%	4,152	57.7%	11	0.2%	-1,115	-15.5%	7,200
Fairfax (part)	59,253	59.0%	41,017	40.8%	174	0.2%	18,236	18.2%	100,444
Frederick	12,109	35.4%	22,064	64.4%	64	0.2%	-9,955	-29.0%	34,237
Loudoun	100,515	59.7%	67,545	40.1%	255	0.2%	32,970	19.6%	168,315
Manassas	7,794	60.3%	5,118	39.6%	18	0.1%	2,676	20.7%	12,930
Manassas Park	2,959	67.5%	1,419	32.4%	3	0.1%	1,540	25.1%	4,381
Prince William (part)	15,765	50.6%	15,317	49.2%	63	0.2%	448	1.4%	31,145
Winchester	4,924	53.9%	4,209	46.0%	10	0.1%	715	7.9%	9,143
Totals	206,356	56.1%	160,841	43.7%	598	0.2%	45,515	12.4%	367,795
