= Tim Hugo =

American politician (born 1963)

Member of the Virginia House of Delegates from the 40th district
- In office January 4, 2003 – January 8, 2020
- Preceded by: Jay O'Brien
- Succeeded by: Dan Helmer

Personal details
- Born: Timothy Douglas Hugo; January 7, 1963 (age 63) Norfolk, Virginia, U.S.
- Party: Republican
- Spouse: Paula
- Children: Christopher, Jacqueline, Katherine, and Matthew
- Education: College of William & Mary (BA)
- Occupation: Businessman, politician, soldier

Military service
- Allegiance: United States
- Branch/service: United States Army
- Years of service: 1990–1998
- Rank: Sergeant
- Unit: Army Reserve

Timothy Douglas Hugo (born January 7, 1963) is an American businessman, military veteran, and Republican politician in the Commonwealth of Virginia. He served as a member of the Virginia House of Delegates from 2003 to 2020, representing the 40th district. Hugo was defeated for re-election in 2019 by Democrat Dan Helmer.

== Overview ==
From 2003 to 2020, Hugo served in the Virginia House of Delegates, representing the 40th district in Fairfax and Prince William counties. The district encompassed both the incorporated and unincorporated areas of Clifton in Fairfax County. It also included unincorporated parts of Centreville, Fairfax, and Fairfax Station in Fairfax County as well as unincorporated sections of Catharpin, Gainesville, Haymarket, and Manassas in Prince William County. Approximately 80% of the district's population and 65% of its landmass is located in Fairfax County.

A member of the Republican Party, Hugo was the House of Delegates' majority caucus chairman. Hugo served on the Commerce and Labor (2007–2020), Education (2003), Finance (2004–2020), Privileges and Elections (2003–2006 and 2010–2020), Science and Technology (2007–2020), and Transportation (2003–2020) committees.

While the 40th district is historically Republican-leaning, Democratic nominee Hillary Clinton bested Republican nominee Donald Trump by an eight-point margin (51–43%) in the 2016 presidential election. In the 2017 elections, Democrat Donte Tanner challenged Hugo, but narrowly lost. Despite having about 14% of the state's population residing within its boundaries, following the 2017 elections, Hugo remained the only Republican in the Virginia General Assembly to represent a district based in Fairfax County. Hugo lost reelection in 2019 to Democrat Dan Helmer. At the time of his defeat, he was the last Republican to represent a significant portion of Fairfax County above the county level.

== Education and professional career ==
In 1986, Hugo earned a Bachelor of Arts (BA) from the College of William & Mary. In 1987, he received a Kodak Fellowship (FS) from the John F. Kennedy School of Government at Harvard University. Between 1990 and 1998, he served in the United States Army Reserve.

Hugo held several staff positions within the United States House of Representatives. He was the legislative director for representative Jennifer Dunn of Washington, and was the chief of staff to representative Bud Shuster of Pennsylvania, chairman of the United States House Committee on Transportation and Infrastructure.

Hugo is the executive director of Free File Alliance, an association of tax preparation companies.

In 2023, Hugo was appointed by Virginia Governor Glenn Youngkin to become the Chairman of the Board for the Virginia Alcoholic Beverage Control Authority.

== Electoral history ==
Hugo was first elected in a December 2002 special election. He replaced Republican incumbent Jay O'Brien, who vacated the seat after he won a November 2002 special election to represent the 39th district in the Senate of Virginia. Hugo was re-elected in 2003, 2005, 2007, 2009, 2011, 2013, and 2015, never receiving less than 57% of the vote. Following Democratic presidential nominee Hillary Clinton's winning of the 40th district by an eight-point margin (51–43%) in 2016, Democrats targeted Hugo in 2017. On November 7, 2017, Hugo had apparently lost by 68 votes to Democratic nominee Donte Tanner, but the following morning, election officials found an error in the reported results, and the results flipped to a 32-vote lead for Hugo. After further canvassing, Hugo's lead increased to 115 votes. As of November 8, the race was too close to call. On November 27, the state board of elections certified the results, giving Hugo a 106-vote victory, but on November 29, the Tanner campaign filed for a recount. A recount was conducted, and on December 14, the recount confirmed that Hugo won the election by 99 votes. Hugo lost in the 2019 election to Dan Helmer.

Date	Election	Candidate	Party	Votes	%
Virginia House of Delegates, 40th district
Dec 17, 2002	Special	Timothy D. "Tim" Hugo	Republican	2,927	67.40
Dec 17, 2002	Special	Carol A. Hawn	Democratic	1,318	30.34
Dec 17, 2002	Special	Joseph P. Oddo	Independent	59	1.36
Dec 17, 2002	Special	Mark A. Calhoun	Independent	39	0.90
Dec 17, 2002	Special	Jay O'Brien was elected to the Senate; seat stayed Republican			
Nov 4, 2003	General	Timothy D. "Tim" Hugo	Republican	9,400	98.24
Nov 4, 2003	General	Write Ins		168	1.76
Nov 8, 2005	General	Timothy D. "Tim" Hugo	Republican	13,076	89.85
Nov 8, 2005	General	Write Ins		1,477	10.15
Nov 6, 2007	General	Timothy D. "Tim" Hugo	Republican	8,707	57.14
Nov 6, 2007	General	Rex A. Simmons	Democratic	6,520	42.78
Nov 6, 2007	General	Write Ins		11	0.07
Nov 3, 2009	General	Timothy D. "Tim" Hugo	Republican	12,056	63.40
Nov 3, 2009	General	Susan S. Conrad	Democratic	6,936	36.47
Nov 3, 2009	General	Write Ins		23	0.12
Nov 8, 2011	General	Timothy D. "Tim" Hugo	Republican	11,565	73.84
Nov 8, 2011	General	Dianne L. Blais	Independent Greens	4,021	25.67
Nov 8, 2011	General	Write Ins		75	0.47
Nov 5, 2013	General	Timothy D. "Tim" Hugo	Republican	14,887	59.96
Nov 5, 2013	General	Jerry L. Foltz	Democratic	9,903	39.88
Nov 5, 2013	General	Write Ins		40	0.16
Nov 3, 2015	General	Timothy D. "Tim" Hugo	Republican	10,875	65.17
Nov 3, 2015	General	Jerry L. Foltz	Democratic	5,781	34.65
Nov 3, 2015	General	Write Ins		28	0.17
Nov 7, 2017	General	Timothy D. "Tim" Hugo	Republican	15,110	50.10
Nov 7, 2017	General	Donte T. Tanner	Democratic	15,004	49.74
Nov 7, 2017	General	Write Ins		48	0.16
Nov 5, 2019	General	Timothy D. "Tim" Hugo	Republican	14,457	47.55
Nov 5, 2019	General	Dan Helmer	Democratic	15,913	52.34
Nov 5, 2019	General	Write Ins		34	0.11
