= Ward Armstrong =

American politician (born 1956)

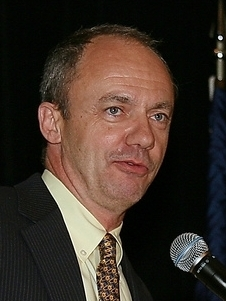
- Armstrong in 2010

Minority Leader of the Virginia House of Delegates
- In office February 24, 2007 – November 19, 2011
- Preceded by: Frank Hall
- Succeeded by: David Toscano

Member of the Virginia House of Delegates from the 10th district
- In office January 9, 2002 – January 11, 2012
- Preceded by: Barnie Day
- Succeeded by: Randy Minchew

Member of the Virginia House of Delegates from the 11th district
- In office January 8, 1992 – January 9, 2002
- Preceded by: A. L. Philpott
- Succeeded by: Chip Woodrum

Personal details
- Born: Ward Lynn Armstrong; June 2, 1956 (age 70) Bassett, Virginia, U.S.
- Party: Democratic
- Spouse: Pamela Akers
- Children: Courtney, Whitney
- Education: Duke University (B.A.); University of Richmond (J.D.)
- Profession: Lawyer
- Website: www.wardarmstrong.com

Ward Lynn Armstrong (born June 2, 1956, in Bassett, Virginia) is an American trial lawyer and Democratic politician. He served in the Virginia House of Delegates from 1992 to 2011, and served as the minority leader from 2007 to 2011.

== Electoral history ==
Date	Election	Candidate	Party	Votes	%
Virginia House of Delegates, 11th district
November 5, 1991	General	Ward Armstrong	Democrat	12,745	76.84
November 5, 1991	General	Naomi L. Hodge-Muse	Republican	3,828	23.08
November 5, 1991	General	Write Ins		14	0.08
November 2, 1993	General				
November 2, 1993	General	Ward Armstrong	Democrat	13,076	99.97
November 2, 1993	General	Write Ins		4	0.03
November 7, 1995	General	Ward Armstrong	Democrat	11.678	63.67
November 7, 1995	General	N. Larry Roach	Republican	6,664	36.33
November 7, 1995	General	Write Ins		0	0.00
November 4, 1997	General	Ward Armstrong	Democrat	12,908	84.07
November 4, 1997	General	Clarence F. Shelton	Reform	1,581	10.30
November 4, 1997	General	Carl B. Craig	Independent	860	5.60
November 4, 1997	General	Write Ins		5	0.03
November 2, 1999	General				
November 2, 1999	General	Ward Armstrong	Democrat	10,210	99.55
November 2, 1999	General	Write Ins		46	0.45
Virginia House of Delegates, 10th district
November 6, 2001	General	Ward Armstrong	Democrat	10,050	53.11
November 6, 2001	General	B. L. Gleiser	Republican	8,873	46.89
November 6, 2001	General	Write Ins		0	0.00

== Early life ==
Armstrong was raised in Bassett, Virginia, graduating from John D. Bassett High School in 1974. He then attended Duke University, where he earned a business degree in 1977. In 1980, Armstrong received a JD degree from the University of Richmond School of Law. During law school, he studied for a summer at the University of Cambridge in England. After law school, he worked as a law clerk to Justice W. Carrington Thompson of the Supreme Court of Virginia for one year. He has practiced law in Martinsville, Virginia since 1981.

== House of Delegates ==
He represented the 10th House District, and served on the Courts of Justice, Rules, and Finance committees. On February 24, 2007, Armstrong was elected Minority Leader of the Democrats in the Virginia House of Delegates. As Minority Leader, he has organized the "51 Club" to assist candidates in an effort to establish a Democratic majority in the House of Delegates.

As of early 2008, Armstrong said he would oppose closing an exemption for one-on-one gun sales between individuals from instant background checks (the gun show loophole), even though he usually plays a key role in rallying Democratic support for Governor Tim Kaine's agenda, saying "My constituents pretty much expect me to oppose it," he said. "Carroll County is my district, and it¹s home to one of the largest gun shows on the East Coast." Armstrong, with two young daughters of his own, said he is filled with sympathy for the Virginia Tech Massacre victims but that it won't sway his opposition to closing the loophole. "As legislators, we have to be dispassionate when it comes to the law."

The Virginia Fifth Congressional District Democratic Committee awarded Armstrong the A. L. Philpott Award for Leadership. He is past president of the Martinsville-Henry County Bar Association; a member of the Virginia Museum of Transportation's Board of Directors; and a member of the Norfolk and Western Historical Society.

Armstrong was defeated on November 8, 2011, while running for election in the 9th House District. Armstrong was placed in the 16th District during the required redistricting after the 2010 census. The 16th district seat was held by Republican incumbent Donald Merricks. Armstrong chose to relocate and challenge Republican incumbent Charles Poindexter in the 9th House district. He left his home and moved into his mother-in-law's house in the town of Bassett. Poindexter defeated Armstrong with 53% to 47% of the vote. During his 2011 campaign Armstrong raised and spent more than $1,000,000.

Armstrong considered running for governor, Lieutenant Governor or attorney general in the 2013 elections but decided not to seek a higher office.

== Personal life ==
Armstrong and his wife, Pamela Akers, have two daughters: Courtney Lynn and Whitney Akers.
