= George Barker (Virginia politician) =

American politician

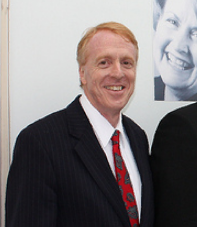

Member of the Virginia Senate from the 39th district
- In office January 9, 2008 – January 10, 2024
- Preceded by: Jay O'Brien
- Succeeded by: Stella Pekarsky (Redistricting)

Personal details
- Born: George Lincoln Barker; August 24, 1951 (age 75) Eldorado, Illinois, U.S.
- Party: Democratic
- Spouse: Jane Barker
- Children: 2
- Education: Harvard University (A.B., M.S.)
- Profession: Health planner
- Committees: General Laws and Technology (Chair); Commerce and Labor; Education and Health; Finance and Appropriations; Rules
- Website: www.senbarker.com

George Lincoln Barker (born August 24, 1951) is an American politician from Virginia who served in the Senate of Virginia from 2008 to 2024. A member of the Democratic Party, he represented the 39th district before being redistricted to the 36th district in 2023. Barker ran for re-election in the new district but narrowly lost in the Democratic primary to Fairfax County School Board member Stella Pekarsky in June 2023.

== Career ==
Barker attended Harvard University, where he received an A.B. degree in Economics and Public Health and an M.S. degree in Health Policy and Management. He began a career in health systems planning with the Health Care Agency of Northern Virginia in the mid-1970s.

In 1990 Barker became the chair of the newly formed Northern Virginia Perinatal Council. The following year, he became president of his homeowner's association. In 2001, he was appointed chair of the Fairfax County Transportation Advisory Commission.

As vice-chair of the Tysons Task Force, Senator Barker worked to improve transportation conditions and helped to re-design Tysons Corner. He has also chaired several other state, county, and regional organizations related to health care, human resources, and transportation.

Over the years, Barker has hosted two shows on Fairfax Public Access Television, Focus on Franconia and Spotlight on Springfield.

Outside of his legislative duties, Barker serves as the current executive director of the Greater Prince William County Health Center.

== Virginia State Senate ==
=== 2007 election ===
Barker announced his candidacy in 2007 against incumbent Republican Jay O'Brien, who represented the 39th District, located in Fairfax County, Virginia. On June 12, Barker defeated Greg J. Galligan in the Democratic primary, 2,585 to 1,641.

O'Brien said that illegal immigration was one of the biggest issues of concern to district voters, proposing aggressive crackdowns. Barker said that voters in the district were more interested in issues such as transportation funding. Barker defeated O'Brien in the general election on November 6, receiving 19,282 votes to O'Brien's 19,131.

=== 2008-2011 legislative sessions ===
In June 2011, the Fairfax Connection said that in the Senate, "Barker has been one of the most successful members in terms of getting legislation through the General Assembly. In the most recent session, for example, he was one of two members who were able to get 20 bills or more to the governor’s desk."

=== 2011 election ===
In early 2010, O'Brien announced that he intended to run for the seat he had lost in 2007. Scott Martin, an assistant dean at George Mason University who ran unsuccessfully for a Fairfax County School Board seat in 2003, also announced he planned to seek the Republican nomination. As of June 2011, O'Brien was no longer running, and Martin had been joined by two other Republican candidates, former Justice Department official Miller Baker and special-education assistant Andre Muange. Muange also dropped out, and Baker defeated Martin 73%-27% in the August 23, 2011 primary.

The Barker-Baker contest was expected to be very close. The total spending for the two campaigns was $1.7 million, the seventh-highest among the 40 Senate contests. Barker won with over 53% of the vote.

=== 2012-2015 legislative sessions ===
In July 2014, Barker, arguing for Medicaid expansion in Virginia, said that uncompensated care has "gone down by 30 percent just in the first few months" of Medicaid expansions in the states that adopted it. PolitiFact Virginia evaluated the claim, rating it "True"; it was the top-read Virginia Truth-O-Meter story of 2014.

Barker was the sponsor of SB1122, passed in 2015, that requires Virginia colleges to immediately notify parents and proactively handle suicide risks on campus with a coordinated support network involving the student, friends, health or counseling centers on campus, and parents. Barker worked on similar bills for several previous years.

=== 2015 election ===
Joe Murray, a Republican, challenged Barker in the November 2015 election. Spending on the election exceeded over half a million dollars. Barker won the election 53.75% to 46.02% for Murray.

=== 2019 election ===
Republican Dutch Hillenburg ran against Barker in the 2019 election. Barker held his seat against Hillenburg, getting 65.9% of the vote.

=== 2023 election ===
Prior to the 2023 Virginia Senate elections, new state legislative maps were implemented following the 2020 Census. Barker was redistricted into the 36th State Senate district. Many of the voters in the new district had never been represented by Barker before, leading to speculation that Barker may be vulnerable to a primary challenger. Fairfax County school board member Stella Pekarsky challenged Barker in the Democratic primary. Pekarsky defeated Barker with 52.5% of the vote, while Barker received 47.5%.

== Personal ==
Barker is a Presbyterian. He and his wife, Jane, have two children, Erik and Emily. He was PTA president at both Robinson Secondary School (1992–94) and Mount Vernon High School (2000–01). He and his wife currently live in Clifton, in Fairfax County.

Senate of Virginia
| Preceded by Jay O'Brien | Member of the Virginia Senate from the 39th district 2008–2024 | Succeeded by Adam Ebbin |
