= Madison Marye =

American politician

Member of the Virginia Senate
- In office December 4, 1973 – August 1, 2002
- Preceded by: John N. Dalton
- Succeeded by: Jay O'Brien
- Constituency: 37th district (1973‍–‍1992); 39th district (1992‍–‍2002)

Personal details
- Born: Madison Ellis Marye; December 3, 1925 Richmond, Virginia, U.S.
- Died: February 23, 2016 (aged 90) Shawsville, Virginia, U.S.
- Party: Democratic
- Spouse: Charlotte Urbas
- Relatives: David Gardiner Tyler (great-uncle); John Alexander Tyler (great-uncle); Lyon Gardiner Tyler (great-uncle); John Tyler (great-grandfather); Julia Gardiner Tyler (great-grandmother); John Tyler Sr. (great-great-grandfather)

Military service
- Branch/service: United States Army
- Years of service: 1944–1965
- Rank: Major
- Battles/wars: World War II; Korean War; Vietnam War
- Awards: Bronze Star Medal; Commendation Medal

Madison Ellis Marye (December 3, 1925 – February 23, 2016) was an American farmer and politician.

Born in Richmond, Virginia, Marye served in the United States Army during World War II, the Korean War, and the Vietnam War. He was a farmer and raised beef cattle in Shawsville, Virginia. Marye served in the Senate of Virginia, from 1973 to 2002, representing parts of southwest Virginia. He was a Democrat. Through his maternal grandmother Margaret Pearl Tyler, he was a great-grandson of John Tyler, the 10th President of the United States.
