= Jay O'Brien (Virginia politician) =

American politician (born 1951)

Member of the Virginia Senate from the 39th district
- In office December 5, 2002 – January 9, 2008
- Preceded by: Madison Marye
- Succeeded by: George Barker

Member of the Virginia House of Delegates from the 40th district
- In office January 8, 1992 – December 5, 2002
- Preceded by: Robert E. Harris
- Succeeded by: Tim Hugo

Personal details
- Born: James Kenneth O'Brien, Jr. December 10, 1951 (age 74) Nuremberg, West Germany
- Party: Republican
- Spouse: Sevea Staves
- Education: U.S. Military Academy (BS); University of Oklahoma (MA)
- Profession: businessman

Military service
- Allegiance: United States
- Branch/service: United States Army
- Years of service: 1973–1978 (Active); 1978–2006 (Reserve)
- Rank: Colonel
- Unit: U.S. Army Reserve

James Kenneth "Jay" O'Brien Jr. (born December 10, 1951) was a Republican member of the Virginia Senate, representing the 39th district from 2003 through 2007. Previously represented the 40th district in the Virginia House of Delegates from 1993 through 2002. O'Brien was defeated in his bid for re-election in 2007, losing in a close race to Democrat George Barker.

== Biography ==
O'Brien was born in Nuremberg, West Germany, on December 10, 1951, to Jim and Mary O'Brien. Along with his father and two brothers, Dennis and Michael, he attended the United States Military Academy and graduated in 1973. He then went on to graduate school at University of Oklahoma where he mastered in Public Administration.
