= Virginia's 40th House of Delegates district =

Virginia legislative district

District map from the 2023 election

Virginia's 40th House of Delegates district elects one of 100 seats in the Virginia House of Delegates, the lower house of the state's bicameral legislature. While District 40 was previously in Fairfax County and Prince William County, Virginia, as of 2023 it is part of the Roanoke metropolitan area. District 40 has been represented by Democrat Dan Helmer since 2020.

== District officeholders ==
Years	Delegate	Party	Electoral history
January 8, 1992 – December 5, 2002	Jay O'Brien	Republican	Resigned; Elected to the Senate of Virginia
January 4, 2003 – January 8, 2020	Tim Hugo	Republican	First elected in 2002
January 8, 2020 – present	Dan Helmer	Democratic	First elected 2019

== Elections ==
In 2017, Republican incumbent Hugo was challenged by first-time candidate, Democrat Donte Tanner. The race became one of four recounts in the 2017 Virginia House of Delegates election, with control of the House decided by one seat; in the 40th district recount, Hugo won reelection by 99 votes, of roughly 30,000 cast.

In 2019, Hugo was challenged and defeated by Democrat Dan Helmer. Helmer, an army veteran who attended the United States Military Academy (West Point), campaigned on gun control, teacher pay increases and continuing Virginia's Medicaid expansion.
