= Dan Helmer =

American politician (born 1981)

Member of the Virginia House of Delegates
- Incumbent
- Assumed office January 8, 2020
- Preceded by: Tim Hugo
- Constituency: 40th district (2020–2024); 10th district (2024–present)

Personal details
- Born: Daniel Isaac Helmer; September 27, 1981 (age 45) New Brunswick, New Jersey, U.S.
- Party: Democratic
- Education: United States Military Academy (BS); Wolfson College, Oxford (MPhil)

Military service
- Allegiance: United States
- Branch/service: United States Army Reserve
- Years of service: 2003–2014, 2017–2024
- Rank: Lieutenant Colonel

Daniel Isaac Helmer (born September 27, 1981) is an American politician who currently serves in the Virginia House of Delegates. Helmer currently serves as Campaigns Chair of the Virginia House Democratic Caucus and chairs the Committee on Counties, Cities and Towns.

A member of the Democratic Party, Helmer currently represents the 10th district, which is located entirely in Fairfax County. In 2019, he successfully ran for the Virginia House of Delegates in district 40, defeating Republican incumbent Tim Hugo. The majority of the pre-redistricted 40th district's population and landmass was located in Fairfax County with a small part in Prince William County.

== Military career ==
Helmer is a graduate of the United States Military Academy (West Point). While at West Point, he earned a Bachelor of Science degree. He earned a master's degree at Wolfson College, Oxford on a Rhodes scholarship. Helmer served tours in Iraq, Afghanistan, and South Korea, and ended his service in the United States Army Reserve as a lieutenant colonel in 2024.

== Virginia House of Delegates ==
=== Elections ===
==== 2019 ====
In 2019, Helmer was the Democratic nominee for Virginia's 40th House of Delegates district. He ran against Republican incumbent Tim Hugo, who had been in office since 2003. The race broke Virginia's fundraising record for a House of Delegates election, with Hugo and Helmer raising a combined $3.6 million. Helmer won with 52% of the vote.

==== 2021 ====
In 2021, Helmer's Republican opponent, Harold Pyon, distributed a campaign mailer to homes in the 40th district, which featured Helmer at a table piled with gold coins. Helmer, who is Jewish, said that in the mailer, his nose was also accentuated and his West Point military insignia was removed from his jacket. He claimed the flier exhibited "antisemitic tropes" which distracted from talking about issues. Pyon's spokesman claimed the mailer was not antisemitic and could be used against any politician who raises taxes. The Jewish Community Relations Council (JCRC) of Greater Washington issued a statement condemning the mailer, calling it "a classic antisemitic trope." An opinion article by The Washington Post editorial board claimed the mailer was paid for by the Virginia Republican Party. It also claimed "The antisemitism conveyed by Mr. Pyon's campaign mailer is classic and blatant. To claim that it was unintentional is to assert blind ignorance of history." While the article said "We have no reason to assume Mr. Pyon, a retired federal worker and former Army medic, is himself an antisemite," it claimed the mailer "fits a recent pattern among Virginia Republican candidates in this fall's legislative elections." The opinion piece prompted responses from both candidates. Pyon issued a statement through his campaign, saying in part, "How dare The Washington Post Editorial Board make these assertions when I have spent my entire life working to bring communities of all faiths, ethnicities, and backgrounds together, and to stand against discrimination of any kind; especially against members of the Jewish community." Helmer responded through his campaign, saying in part, "To have someone bring hate to our community, use images like this, seek to divide us, is not what we deserve as leadership of the House of Delegates."

==== 2023 ====
In 2023, after redistricting caused Helmer's district to lose its Republican-leaning Prince William County part for areas in the more Democratic-leaning Fairfax County, the district was renumbered from the 40th to the 10th in the process, he sought to maintain his incumbency advantage by falsely claiming to be the incumbent of the newly added redistricted areas in targeted campaign mailers. According to The Washington Post, the campaign mailers looked liked they were on "official-looking letter[heads]", and stated that Helmer could assist voters with constituent issues "as your Delegate" when in fact their present delegates were tasked with those duties. Helmer's mailers caused confusion for voters with The Washington Post learning about them after being contacted by concerned citizens. Helmer acknowledged the mailers in a statement to the Post, but he did not offer an apology for the confusion, stating that his office is ready to assist people outside his district. Helmer's opponent, Marine Corps veteran James Thomas, denounced the false campaign mailers by stating that Helmer sought to claim incumbency over the new voters before the democratic process had even run its course.

== U.S. House of Representatives ==
=== Elections ===
==== 2018 ====
In 2018, Helmer was a Democratic candidate for the 2018 Virginia's 10th congressional district election in the United States House of Representatives. According to The Cook Political Report, state senator Jennifer Wexton was "the substantial frontrunner", and she ultimately won the primary with 42% of the vote while Helmer garnered 12.5%.

In 2017, one of Helmer's campaign videos titled "Helmer Zone" went viral, reaching number four on the YouTube trending list within 24 hours. The video, in which Helmer spoofed the film "Top Gun" and sang "You've Lost That Centrist Feeling", garnered mixed reactions.

Helmer had been an early and vocal proponent of impeaching president Donald Trump. Another of Helmer's campaign ads sparked controversy by saying, "After 9/11, the greatest threat to our democracy lived in a cave (Osama bin Laden). Today, he lives in the White House (Donald Trump)." The ad faced bipartisan criticism from the Trump administration as "nothing short of reprehensible" as well as from Democratic leader Nancy Pelosi.

==== 2024 ====
In November 2023, shortly after winning reelection to his House of Delegates seat, Helmer announced his intention to seek the Democratic Party nomination for a second time in Virginia's 10th congressional district after the incumbent representative, Democrat Jennifer Wexton, declined to run for reelection due to illness.

The Loudoun Times-Mirror reported that, through June 2024, three political action committees (PACs) had spent over $5.4 million supporting Helmer's campaign, including over $4 million from a PAC supporting the cryptocurrency industry. Helmer also raised $1.5 million directly to his campaign, bringing his total financial support to about $7 million. Helmer's campaign far outraised all of his opponents with State Senator Suhas Subramanyam, his closest fundraising competitor, raising $0.9 million in direct campaign funds and $0.6 million in outside PAC spending for a total of about $1.5 million. The VPM Media Corporation noted that Helmer's support of "blockchain technologies and cryptocurrencies" infused him with substantial monetary resources.

According to The New York Times, a Democratic Party official, through an anonymous statement from her attorney in June 2024, accused Helmer of "groping her and later making sexually crude remarks." Current and former Loudoun County Democratic Party officials said that the committee "developed its sexual harassment policies in response to "the egregious harassment" of a Loudoun County party member by Mr. Helmer."

Numerous Democratic Party politicians and officials, including three former Loudoun County party chairmen, and the National Organization for Women (NOW) called on Helmer to withdraw from the race. NOW also alleged that Helmer bullied a female colleague into voting down a bill, during a subcommittee hearing, that would have mandated employer-provided training for anti-sexual harassment and anti-discrimination behavior. Helmer refused to drop out, calling the allegations against him "baseless", and claiming that they were trumped-up by his opponent's allies in the final week of the campaign. The former Loudoun County Democratic Party chairman, who led the effort to try and get Helmer to drop out, said that "if his party nominated Mr. Helmer, it would be taking a risk" in the general election. A spokesman for the National Republican Congressional Committee, called Helmer "a Democrat with serious ethical baggage that would make for devastating political attack ads and alienate a large bloc of independents and Democrat[ic] base voters."

The primary election was highlighted by Roll Call as a race to watch because of the substantial fundraising and the allegations levelled against Helmer. In June 2024, Helmer lost the Democratic Party nomination to Subramanyam; Helmer collected 26.6% of the vote to Subramanyam's 30.4% in a 12 candidate field.

In February 2025, Helmer sued for $15 million in Fairfax County Circuit Court, arguing that the sexual assault allegations against him were unfounded and maliciously intended to defame him. The defendants include the woman who accused Helmer of groping her; Charles King, the woman's attorney; Avram Fechter, former chairman of the Loudoun County Democratic Committee; and two others (listed as John and Jane Doe). Helmer claims their purpose was to derail his bid for the Democratic nomination in Virginia's 10th District, for which he was leading in the polls prior to the allegations. The lawsuit alleges that Fechter funded a PAC that blasted text messages to voters accusing Helmer of sexual assault days before the election. It also claims that the woman who made the allegations had supported Helmer's candidacy before receiving $10,000 for work performed for a rival campaign. Additionally, the suit contends that the woman's lawyer has a history of working with groups known to use false claims to discredit political opponents.

In October 2025, defendants Avram Fechter and Charles King entered into a settlement with Helmer, the terms of which are confidential. In January 2026, Helmer announced that the woman who made the accusation had also reached a settlement.

==== 2026 ====
Helmer briefly ran for the Virginia's 7th congressional district in 2026. The district was newly redrawn as a result of the passage of the 2026 Virginia redistricting referendum. Helmer withdrew from the race after the Virginia Supreme Court struck down the amendment.

== Political positions ==
=== Donald Trump ===
Helmer opposes Donald Trump. In May 2018, he compared Trump to Osama bin Laden, the perpetrator of the September 11 attacks and also called him the biggest threat to democracy. In 2023, Helmer introduced a bill to bar January 6th insurrectionists from public office in Virginia. In 2026, Helmer introduced a bill that would require schools that choose to discuss the January 6 United States Capitol Attack in classrooms to tell the truth about what happened without citing misinformation about the 2020 Election. Governor Abigail Spanberger signed an amended version of the bill into law.

=== Electoral law ===
Helmer sponsored legislation, commonly called Helmer's Law, that requires primaries to accept absentee ballots from military members serving overseas, higher education students, those living outside of the country temporarily, those living with disabilities, and those exposed to communicable diseases. This effectively forces primary elections to use state-run, rather than party-run, methods of election, effectively prohibiting methods like firehouse primaries, mass meetings, and conventions. These methods would be difficult to do in a way that accommodated absentee voters, according to Attorney General Jason Miyares, who also said that requiring a voter's presence or excluding them for their non-presence ran counter to the law. Members of the Republican Committee of the 6th Congressional District filed a lawsuit against this law in 2024, alleging that this may allow voters from outside the party to vote in their primary elections.

=== Gun control ===
Helmer supports universal background checks, banning high-capacity magazines and silencers, regulating private gun sales, and red-flag laws that law enforcement may use to temporarily remove firearms from persons deemed dangerous to themselves or others.

In May 2018, Helmer purchased a semi-automatic rifle, without a background check in under 10 minutes, at a gun show in Chantilly, Virginia. The video, produced by his campaign, was picked up by major news organizations such as The Hill, The Washington Post, and Vox. In January 2020, Helmer introduced HB 567, a bill that would outlaw indoor firing ranges in buildings with more than 50 employees. Also in January, when gun rights activists descended on Richmond, Chris Hurst and Helmer allowed students representing March for Our Lives to sleep in their Richmond offices in order to be able to participate in gun control advocacy.

=== Healthcare ===
Helmer supports adding a public option to Medicare. In 2022, he passed legislation to promote price transparency in healthcare, requiring hospitals to make information standard charges for items and services provided by the hospital available on the hospital's website. He carried legislation to update the law in 2026.

Helmer has also passed legislation requiring the Health Insurance Reform Commission (HIRC) to consider coverage for diagnosis and treatment of infertility and procedures like IVF in its 2025 review of essential health benefits covered by health insurance with HB1609. Following this review, legislation to add fertility treatment services to Virginia's Essential Health Benefits benchmark plan beginning in 2028 was passed.

=== Housing ===
In 2026, Helmer introduced a bill to allow by-right zoning for multifamily and mixed-use residential development in commercial and business zoned districts, which failed to pass the Senate. He also passed legislation to create a revolving loan fund for the production of mixed-income housing development, which was part of Governor Abigail Spanberger's "Affordable Virginia Agenda."

=== Labor rights ===
In 2021, Helmer supported Lee J. Carter's bill to repeal Virginia's right-to-work law.

=== Women's rights ===
Helmer supports abortion, the Equal Rights Amendment, and eliminating taxes on menstrual hygiene products.

== Electoral history ==
Virginia's 10th congressional district Democratic primary results, 2018
Party	Candidate	Votes	%
Democratic	Jennifer Wexton	22,405	41.89
Democratic	Alison Friedman	12,283	22.96
Democratic	Lindsey Davis Stover	8,567	16.02
Democratic	Dan Helmer	6,712	12.55
Democratic	Paul Pelletier	2,010	3.76
Democratic	Julia Biggins	1,513	2.83
Total votes		53,490	100.0

Virginia House of Delegates district 40 general election results, 2019
Party	Candidate	Votes	%
Democratic	Dan Helmer	15,913	52.34
Republican	Tim Hugo (incumbent)	14,457	47.55
Write-in		34	0.11
Total votes		30,404	100.0
Democratic gain from Republican			

Virginia House of Delegates district 40 general election results, 2021
Party	Candidate	Votes	%
Democratic	Dan Helmer	20,201	52.65
Republican	Harold Pyon	18,133	47.26
Write-in		37	0.10
Total votes		38,371	100.0
Democratic hold			

Virginia's 10th House of Delegates District, 2023 General Election
Party	Candidate	Votes	%
Democratic	Dan Helmer (incumbent)	15,569	59.44%
Republican	James Thomas	10,547	40.27%
Write-in		76	0.29%
Total votes		26,192	100%
Democratic hold			

United States House of Representatives Democratic primary election: 10th District, 2024
Party	Candidate	Votes	%
Democratic	Suhas Subramanyam	13,504	30.4%
Democratic	Dan Helmer	11,784	26.6%
Democratic	Atif Qarni	4,768	10.7%
Democratic	Eileen Filler-Corn	4,131	9.3%
Democratic	Jennifer Boysko	4,016	9.0%
Democratic	David Reid	1,419	3.2%
Democratic	Michelle Maldonado	1,412	3.2%
Democratic	Adrian Pokharel	1,028	2.3%
Democratic	Krystle Kaul	982	2.2%
Democratic	Travis Nembhard	722	1.6%
Democratic	Marion Devoe	386	0.9%
Democratic	Mark Leighton	225	0.5%
Total votes		44,377	100.0%

Virginia's 10th House of Delegates District, 2025 General Election
Party	Candidate	Votes	%
Democratic	Dan Helmer (incumbent)	23,946	67.38%
Republican	David Guill	11,517	32.40%
Write-in		78	0.22%
Total votes		35,541	100%
Democratic hold			
