= Randy Minchew =

American politician (born 1957)

Member of the Virginia House of Delegates from the 10th district
- In office January 11, 2012 – January 10, 2018
- Preceded by: Ward Armstrong
- Succeeded by: Wendy Gooditis

Personal details
- Born: July 31, 1957 (age 69) Arlington, Virginia
- Party: Republican
- Spouse: Teresa Hatterick Minchew
- Education: Duke University; Magdalen College, Oxford; Washington and Lee University School of Law; Virginia Theological Seminary
- Occupation: Lawyer
- Committees: Courts of Justice; Transportation
- Website: minchewfordelegate.com

John Randall "Randy" Minchew (born July 31, 1957, in Arlington, Virginia) is an American politician and lawyer. A Republican, he was first elected to the Virginia House of Delegates in 2011, and re-elected for two subsequent terms. He represented the 10th district, made up of parts of Clarke, Frederick and Loudoun counties in the northern part of the state.

== Early life, education, business career ==
Minchew attended Langley High School in Fairfax County, Virginia; as a senior, he was a campaign volunteer for future Congressman Frank Wolf. He received an A.B. degree from Duke University in 1980, studying public policy and economics.

After graduation, he worked in the district attorney's office in Durham County, North Carolina. He received a certificate from Magdalen College, Oxford, in 1982, and a J.D. from Washington and Lee University School of Law in 1984, after which he clerked for Supreme Court of Virginia Justice Christian Compton. He then moved to Leesburg, Virginia to practice law.

Minchew married Teresa "Terri" Hatterick c. 1992. They have a son, Jack.

In 2010, Minchew received a diploma in Theological Studies from the Virginia Theological Seminary.

== Political career ==
Minchew became involved with the Loudoun County Republican Committee after his move to Leesburg, and was twice elected county Republican chair. In late 2005, Senator Bill Mims resigned his 33rd district Senate of Virginia seat to become Chief Deputy Attorney General. Minchew ran for the Republican nomination, finishing second in a four-way race, behind Loudoun County Supervisor Mick Staton. Staton lost the ensuing special election to Democrat Mark Herring.

The 10th House district was moved from the Martinsville area, on Virginia's southern border, to the northern tip of the state in the 2011 redistricting. Minchew won a three-way Republican primary in the new district, defeating his closest competitor, attorney John Whitbeck, by 87 votes. He defeated Democratic candidate David S. "Dave" Butler in the general election, 8140–5789.

In 2013, Minchew faced no challenger for the Republican nomination. His general election campaign included a TV ad touting his accomplishments Minchew was endorsed by the National Federation of Independent Business, the Virginia Farm Bureau, the Virginia Association of Realtors, the Loudoun County Chamber of Commerce, and the Virginia Education Association, as well as the Loudoun, Frederick, and Clarke County Education associations, the Washington Post, and the Loudoun Times-Mirror. Minchew won re-election in the general election, decisively defeating Democratic challenger Monte A. Johnson, 12,950 - 9,723 (57% - 43%).

In 2015, Minchew again faced no challenger for the Republican nomination. In the general election he faced Democrat Peter Rush, a Leesburg resident and formerly a member of the Loudoun County Soil and Water Board. Minchew won re-election 10,415-6,355 (62%-38%). This was his largest margin of victory since taking office.

In 2016, Minchew introduced HB 1181, which would have forced Virginia's representatives to the Electoral College to vote according to how individual congressional districts voted rather than how the state voted overall. The bill was criticized for being highly partisan, as the system of voting would give an advantage to Republican presidential candidates. Virginia's current winner-takes-all system is shared by 47 other states and the District of Columbia.

In 2017, Minchew was defeated in his bid for a fourth term in the Virginia House of Delegates, losing to Democratic candidate Wendy Gooditis 15,151-14,014.

== Political positions ==
Randy Minchew opposes cannabis legalization.
