= Federal Employee Paid Leave Act =

On December 20, 2019, as part of the National Defense Authorization Act (NDAA) for Fiscal Year 2020, the Federal Employee Paid Leave Act (FEPLA) granted federal government employees up to 12 weeks of paid time off for the birth, adoption or foster of a new child. The law applies to births or placements occurring on or after October 1, 2020.
