= Jennifer Wexton =

American politician (born 1968)

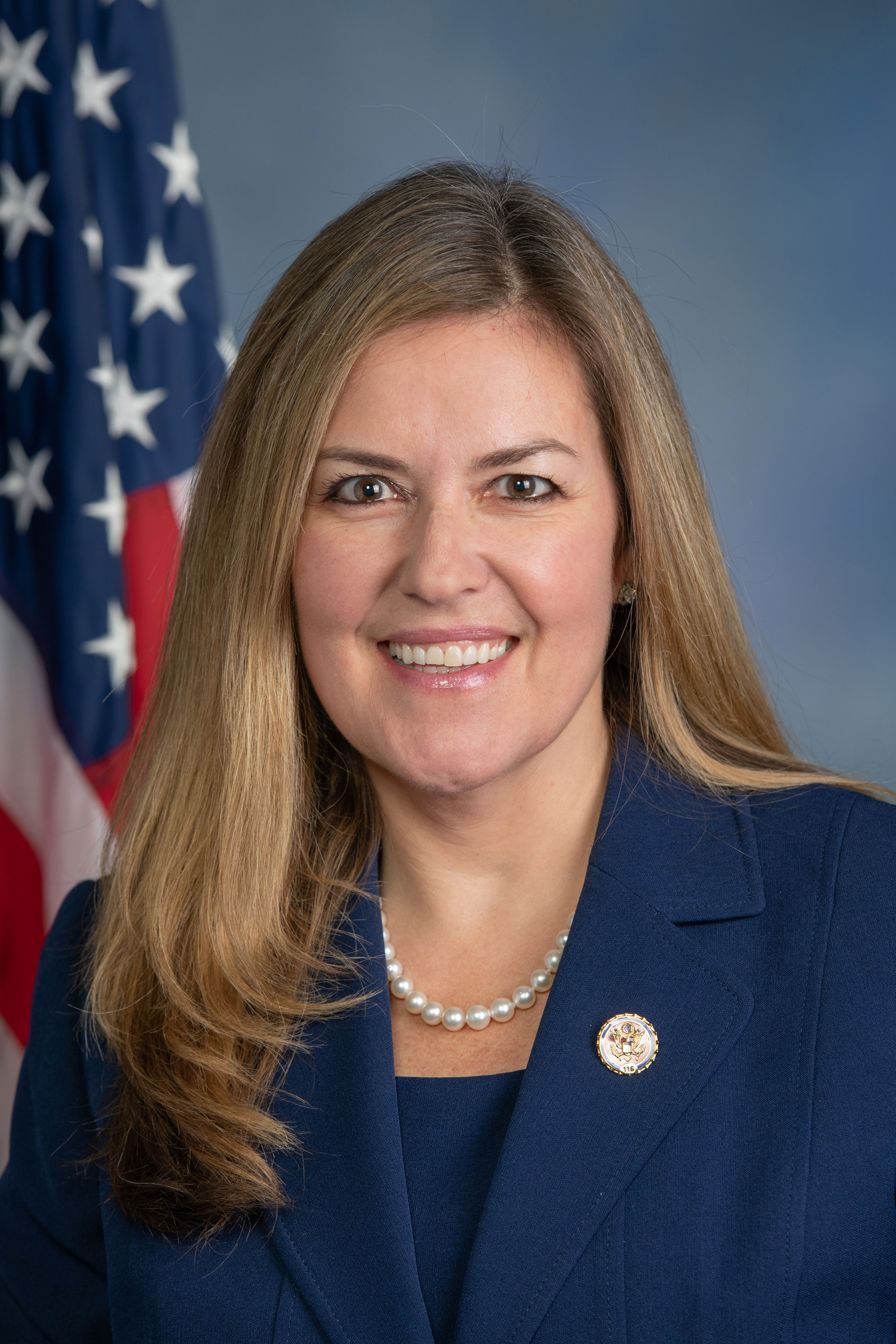
- Official portrait, 2019

Member of the U.S. House of Representatives from Virginia's 10th district
- In office January 3, 2019 – January 3, 2025
- Preceded by: Barbara Comstock
- Succeeded by: Suhas Subramanyam

Member of the Virginia Senate from the 33rd district
- In office January 24, 2014 – January 3, 2019
- Preceded by: Mark Herring
- Succeeded by: Jennifer Boysko

Personal details
- Born: Jennifer Lynn Tosini; May 27, 1968 (age 58) Washington, D.C., U.S.
- Party: Democratic
- Spouse: Andrew Wexton (m. 2001)
- Children: 2
- Education: University of Maryland, College Park (BA); College of William and Mary (JD)

Jennifer Lynn Wexton (née Tosini, May 27, 1968) is an American politician and lawyer who served as the U.S. representative for Virginia's 10th congressional district from 2019 to 2025. A member of the Democratic Party, she previously served in the Virginia Senate from 2014 to 2019.

Prior to her election to Congress, she represented the 33rd district, which includes parts of Fairfax and Loudoun Counties from 2014 to 2019.

In 2018, Wexton defeated Republican incumbent Barbara Comstock with 56% of the vote. She was re-elected in 2020 and 2022. Some commentators have described Wexton as a moderate Democrat. In September 2023, after being diagnosed with progressive supranuclear palsy, Wexton announced that she would not seek re-election in 2024. She was succeeded by Democratic state senator Suhas Subramanyam.

== Early life and education ==
Wexton is from Leesburg, Virginia. Her father and mother were senior economists at the United States Department of the Treasury and the Commodity Futures Trading Commission, respectively.

In 1992, Wexton graduated with a Bachelor of Arts degree from the University of Maryland, College Park. She then enrolled at the College of William & Mary's Law School and received a Juris Doctor in 1995. At William & Mary, she was a member of Phi Delta Phi, a legal honor society.

== Early career ==
Wexton was a partner in the Laurel Brigade Law Group. She served as a substitute judge in Loudoun County, Virginia, and from 2001 to 2005 as an Assistant Commonwealth's Attorney.

Wexton successfully prosecuted Clara Jane Schwartz for the murder of her father, Robert Schwartz. She ran for Loudoun County Commonwealth's Attorney in 2011, narrowly losing to Republican incumbent Jim Plowman. She was elected to the Virginia Senate in 2014.

=== Virginia Senate ===
After Mark Herring, who represented the 33rd district in the Virginia Senate, won the 2013 election for attorney general of Virginia, Wexton declared her candidacy in the special election to fill the seat. The district includes northeastern Loudoun County and northwestern Fairfax County. In the Democratic primary, Wexton defeated Herndon Town Councilor Sheila Olem. In a campaign ad Wexton spoke of her experience defending victims of rape and assault and said she would "fight just as hard against tea party Republicans who would take away a woman's health care and her right to choose, even in cases of rape and incest." The Republican Party of Virginia criticized the ad, saying it compared Tea Party activists to rapists; Wexton's campaign denied the comparison. She faced Republican John Whitbeck and Republican-turned-Independent Joe T. May in the January 2014 special election, and won 53%–38%–10%. She took office on January 24, 2014, and was reelected in the November 2015 general election. After being elected to the United States House of Representatives, Wexton resigned her Virginia Senate seat on January 3, 2019.

== U.S. House of Representatives ==
=== Elections ===
==== 2018 ====
In April 2017, Wexton announced that she would run in the Democratic primary for the 10th district. Her state senate district included much of the eastern portion of the congressional district, wrapping around Leesburg and Sterling. In June 2018 she won a six-way primary to become the Democratic nominee. She defeated Alison Friedman, Lindsey Davis Stover, Deep Sran, Dan Helmer, Paul Pelletier, and Julia Biggins in the Democratic primary. In the November general election she defeated Republican incumbent Barbara Comstock with 56% of the vote to Comstock's 44%.

Wexton's victory meant that a Democrat would represent the 10th district for the first time since 1981. The district had been represented by a Republican in Congress for 60 of the previous 66 years. Wexton's victory also meant that until the next voting cycle, no Republicans would represent a congressional district in the immediate Washington, D.C. region.

==== 2020 ====
Wexton was reelected to a second term in 2020, defeating the Republican nominee, former U.S. marine Aliscia Andrews.

==== 2022 ====
Wexton was reelected to a third term in 2022, defeating Republican nominee and U.S. Navy veteran Hung Cao, 53.2% to 46.7%.

=== Tenure ===
Shortly after defeating Comstock, Wexton declared her support for D.C. statehood.

Wexton opposed Nancy Pelosi for speaker when running for Congress in 2018, but voted for Pelosi for speaker in 2019.

In May 2019, Wexton called for HUD Secretary Ben Carson's resignation after his House testimony that month.

In July 2019, Wexton visited two mosques in Northern Virginia to hear from Muslim residents after President Donald Trump vilified Somali-born congresswoman Ilhan Omar at a campaign rally. Later that month, she announced her support for voting to impeach Trump over his request that Ukraine announce an investigation into his political rival Joe Biden. On August 23, 2019, Wexton formed a new congressional caucus to examine and promote agritourism, which she believes could bring economic and social benefits to areas like the Loudoun Valley.

In September 2020, Wexton authored the Uyghur Forced Labor Disclosure Act of 2020, a bill to require all publicly traded US companies to disclose whether any of their goods or part of their supply chain can be traced to the use of forced labor by ethnic minorities in Chinese internment camps or factories. The act was a companion bill to the Uyghur Forced Labor Prevention Act, which seeks to keep goods made with forced labor of detained ethnic minorities in China out of the US.

During Donald Trump's presidency, Wexton voted in line with the president's stated position 6.5% of the time. During the 117th Congress, she voted with President Joe Biden's stated position 100% of the time according to a FiveThirtyEight analysis.

After being diagnosed with progressive supra-nuclear palsy in September 2023, Wexton announced that she would not seek reelection in 2024.

On July 25, 2024, Wexton became the first member of the House of Representatives to have a model of her voice generated by artificial intelligence speak for her on the House floor. This also made her the first member of the House of Representatives to use any augmentative and alternative communication device on the House floor. The model said in part, "My battle with progressive Supranuclear palsy, or PSP, has robbed me of my ability to use my full voice and move around in the ways that I used to."

=== Committee assignments ===
- Committee on Appropriations
  - Subcommittee on Transportation, Housing and Urban Development, and Related Agencies
  - Subcommittee on the Legislative Branch
- Committee on the Budget

=== Caucus memberships ===
- Congressional LGBT Equality Caucus
- New Democrat Coalition
- Congressional Asian Pacific American Caucus
- Rare Disease Caucus

== Political positions ==
Some commentators have called Wexton a moderate Democrat. She has emphasized her willingness to compromise and work with both Republicans and Democrats.

=== Crime ===
On February 9, 2023, Wexton voted to allow the District of Columbia's Revised Criminal Code Act of 2022 to take effect. This act was a rewrite and modernization of the criminal code and included reductions in the maximum penalties for burglary, carjacking, and robbery.

=== Economy ===
In a 2019 town hall event, Wexton described herself as a capitalist. In 2020, she supported increasing federal spending on infrastructure improvements and subsidies for the US airline industry, which was hit by decreased travel demand during the coronavirus pandemic. She also supports expanding broadband access, particularly in rural areas.

=== Guns ===
Wexton supports a bill to study the utility of credit card transactions as a warning tool for mass shootings. She suggested that "the Second Amendment and gun-violence prevention laws can coexist."

=== Health care ===
Wexton supports a public option for health care, suggesting that it would provide increased competition in areas with fewer private insurance options. She does not support "Medicare for All", a proposal to create a single-payer healthcare system and eliminate private insurance. She supports granting the federal government the ability to negotiate prescription drug prices.

Wexton supports strengthening the Affordable Care Act and opposes the Trump administration's efforts to convince the US Supreme Court to invalidate the law. In a 2020 debate, she argued that striking down the ACA would once again allow insurance companies to impose lifetime health care spending limits.

=== Immigration ===
Wexton supports expanding the federal seasonal agricultural worker visa program and the H-1B visa program.

=== Labor rights ===
Wexton supports making it easier for workers to unionize. She criticized the Trump administration for not enforcing federally mandated workplace protections during the coronavirus pandemic.

=== LGBT rights ===
In January 2019, Wexton hung a transgender pride flag outside her office to show her support for the transgender community. In February 2021, Wexton tweeted in support of Marie Newman, who has a transgender daughter, after Newman received criticism from Republican representative Marjorie Taylor Greene for hanging a transgender flag outside her office as the House passed the Equality Act.

== Electoral history ==
Date	Election	Candidate	Party	Votes	%
Loudoun County Commonwealth's Attorney
November 8, 2011	General	James E. "Jim" Plowman	Republican	26,050	51.83
November 8, 2011	General	Jennifer T. Wexton	Democratic	24,104	47.96
November 8, 2011	General	Write-ins		101	0.20
November 8, 2011	General	Republican incumbent reelected			
Virginia Senate, 33rd District
January 21, 2014	General Special	Jennifer T. Wexton	Democratic	11,431	52.72
January 21, 2014	General Special	John C. L. Whitbeck, Jr.	Republican	8,133	37.51
January 21, 2014	General Special	Joe T. May	Independent	2,117	9.76
January 21, 2014	General Special	Write-ins		3	0.01
January 21, 2014	General Special	Mark Herring resigned; seat remained Democratic			
November 3, 2015	General	Jennifer T. Wexton	Democratic	18,577	56.60
November 3, 2015	General	Stephen B. Hollingshead	Republican	14,190	43.23
November 3, 2015	General	Write-ins		54	0.16

Virginia's 10th congressional district Democratic primary results, 2018
Party	Candidate	Votes	%
Democratic	Jennifer Wexton	22,405	41.89
Democratic	Alison Friedman	12,283	22.96
Democratic	Lindsey Davis Stover	8,567	16.02
Democratic	Dan Helmer	6,712	12.55
Democratic	Paul Pelletier	2,010	3.76
Democratic	Julia Biggins	1,513	2.83
Total votes		53,490	100.0

Virginia's 10th congressional district general election results, 2018
Party	Candidate	Votes	%
Democratic	Jennifer Wexton	206,356	56.1
Republican	Barbara Comstock (incumbent)	160,841	43.7
Write-in		598	0.2
Total votes		367,795	100.0
Democratic gain from Republican			

Virginia's 10th congressional district general election results, 2020
Party	Candidate	Votes	%	±%
Democratic	Jennifer Wexton	268,734	56.5	+0.4
Republican	Aliscia Andrews	206,253	43.4	−0.3
Write-in		559	0.1	-0.1
Total votes		475,546	100.0	
Democratic hold				

2022 Virginia's 10th Congressional District election
Party	Candidate	Votes	%	±%
Democratic	Jennifer Wexton (incumbent)	157,405	53.15%	−3.35%
Republican	Hung Cao	138,163	46.65%	+3.25%
Write-in		577	0.19%	+.09%
Total votes		296,145		
Democratic hold				

== Personal life ==
Wexton married Andrew Wexton in 2001. They have two sons.

In April 2023, Wexton announced that she had been diagnosed with Parkinson's disease. In September of that year, she announced that her diagnosis had been changed to progressive supranuclear palsy, which is often misdiagnosed as Parkinson's disease at early stages. The condition has affected Wexton's mobility, her hearing, and her ability to speak. In May 2024, Wexton started using a text to speech app for delivering her speeches on the floor of the House.

== See also ==
- Women in the United States House of Representatives

U.S. House of Representatives
Preceded by Barbara Comstock	Member of the U.S. House of Representatives from Virginia's 10th congressional district 2019–2025	Succeeded by Suhas Subramanyam
U.S. order of precedence (ceremonial)
Preceded by Scott Rigell as Former U.S. Representative	Order of precedence of the United States as Former U.S. Representative	Succeeded by Susan Molinari as Former U.S. Representative
