= Virginia's 39th Senate district =

American legislative district

- District map following the 2021 redistricting
- Senator: Elizabeth Bennett-Parker
- Demographics: 52% White; 18% Black/African American; 12% Asian; 14% Hispanic
- Population: 215,742
- Registered voters: 149,554

Virginia's 39th Senate district elects one of the 40 members of the Virginia Senate, which is the upper house of the state's bicameral legislature, the Virginia General Assembly.. It has been represented by Democrat Elizabeth Bennett-Parker since 2026.

Following the 2021 Virginia redistricting, the district was formed from parts of the 5th, 6th, and 7th Virginia Senate districts.

== Geography ==
District 39 all of Alexandria and parts of Arlington County and Fairfax County.

The district is based entirely within Virginia's 8th congressional district.

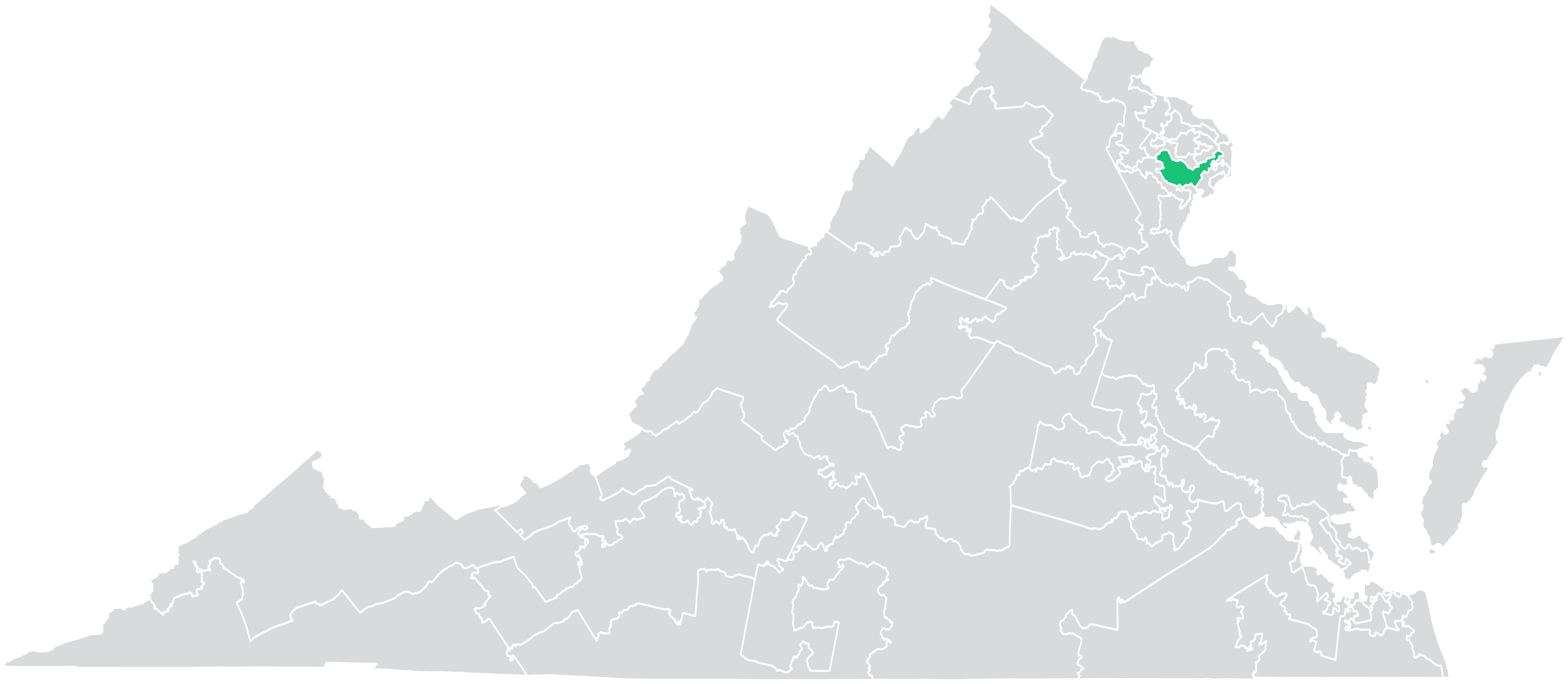
District map from before the 2021 redistricting

== Recent election results ==
=== 2019 ===
2019 Virginia Senate election, District 39
Party	Candidate	Votes	%
Democratic	George Barker (incumbent)	40,259	65.9
Republican	Dutch Hillenburg	20,757	34.0
Total votes		61,088	100
Democratic hold			

=== 2015 ===
2015 Virginia Senate election, District 39
Party	Candidate	Votes	%
Democratic	George Barker (incumbent)	20,083	53.9
Republican	Joe Murray	17,101	45.9
Total votes		37,269	100
Democratic hold			

=== 2011 ===
2011 Virginia Senate election, District 39
Primary election
Party	Candidate	Votes	%
Republican	M. Miller Baker	4,201	73.3
Republican	Scott Martin	1,528	26.7
Total votes		5,729	100
General election
Democratic	George Barker (incumbent)	21,201	53.1
Republican	M. Miller Baker	18,687	46.8
Total votes		39,941	100
Democratic hold			

=== Federal and statewide results ===
Year	Office	Results
2020	President	Biden 67.6–30.6%
2017	Governor	Northam 66.3–32.9%
2016	President	Clinton 64.1–30.7%
2014	Senate	Warner 56.1–42.0%
2013	Governor	McAuliffe 57.6–37.8%
2012	President	Obama 59.9–39.0%
2012	Senate	Kaine 61.0–39.0%

== Historical results ==
All election results below took place prior to 2011 redistricting, and thus were under different district lines.

=== 2007 ===
2007 Virginia Senate election, District 39
Primary election
Party	Candidate	Votes	%
Democratic	George Barker	2,585	61.2
Democratic	Greg Galligan	1,641	38.8
Total votes		4,226	100
General election
Democratic	George Barker	19,892	50.9
Republican	Jay O'Brien (incumbent)	19,131	49.0
Total votes		39,064	100
Democratic gain from Republican			

=== 2003 ===
2003 Virginia Senate election, District 39
Party	Candidate	Votes	%
Republican	Jay O'Brien (incumbent)	18,780	57.8
Democratic	Greg Galligan	13,717	42.2
Total votes		32,516	100
Republican hold			

=== 2002 special ===
As a result of redistricting prior to the 2003 elections, District 39 moved from Southwest Virginia to Northern Virginia, causing then-incumbent Madison Marye to resign and forcing a special election.

2002 Virginia Senate special election, District 39
Party	Candidate	Votes	%
Republican	Jay O'Brien	27,935	56.6
Democratic	R. M. Lynch	21,364	43.3
Total votes		49,324	100
Republican gain from Democratic			

=== 1999 ===
1999 Virginia Senate election, District 39
Party	Candidate	Votes	%
Democratic	Madison Marye (incumbent)	21,951	59.3
Republican	Jim Jones	15,032	40.6
Total votes		36,989	100
Democratic hold			

=== 1995 ===
1995 Virginia Senate election, District 39
Party	Candidate	Votes	%
Democratic	Madison Marye (incumbent)	23,206	53.0
Republican	Patrick Cupp	20,616	47.0
Total votes		43,822	100
Democratic hold			
