= 2026 United States House of Representatives elections in Virginia =

- November 3, 2026

All 11 Virginia seats to the United States House of Representatives
| | Majority party | Minority party |
|---|---|---|
| Party | Democratic | Republican |
| Last election | 6 | 5 |
| Seats won | 8 | 3 |
| Seat change | ▲2 | ▼2 |
| Popular vote | 2,141,172 | 1,433,701 |
| Percentage | 58.90% | 39.44% |
| Swing | ▲7.50% | ▼8.20% |

Democratic hold Democratic gain
Republican hold
Democratic
40–50%
50–60%
60–70%
70–80%
80–90%
Republican
40–50%
50–60%
60–70%
70–80%
80–90%

The 2026 United States House of Representatives elections in Virginia were held on November 3, 2026, to elect the 11 U.S. representatives from the state of Virginia, one from each of the state's congressional districts. The elections coincided with other elections to the House of Representatives, elections to the United States Senate, and various state and local elections. Primary elections took place on August 4, 2026.

== Redistricting ==
=== Background ===
In April 2026, voters narrowly approved a constitutional amendment to allow for mid-decade redistricting and to instate a map that would have likely given Democrats 10 of Virginia's 11 seats in the House of Representatives. However, on May 8, the Supreme Court of Virginia ruled the referendum vote null and void in a 4–3 decision, stating the General Assembly "violated the intervening-election requirement in Article XII, Section 1 of the Constitution of Virginia" by first passing the amendment while early voting was underway for the 2025 elections. As a result, the 2021 Special Masters map remained in effect for the 2026 midterms. Following the ruling, House Speaker Don Scott and Attorney General Jay Jones filed an emergency appeal to the Supreme Court of the United States and filed a motion requesting the state Supreme Court to pause its ruling from taking effect while the appeal plays out. On May 15, the U.S. Supreme Court declined to hear the appeal.

== Statewide polling ==
| Poll source | Date(s) administered | Sample size (Note: Key: A – all adults RV – registered voters LV – likely voters V – unclear) | Margin of error | Democratic party | Republican party | Other | Undecided |
|---|---|---|---|---|---|---|---|
| State Navigate | October 17–20, 2026 | 863 (LV) | ± 3.3% | 59% | 39% | – | 3% |

== Statewide results ==
| Party | Candidates | Votes | | Seats | | |
| Party | Candidates | No. | % | No. | +/– | % |
|---|---|---|---|---|---|---|
| Democratic Party | 11 | | | | | |
| Republican Party | 11 | | | | | |
| Libertarian Party | 2 | | | | | |
| Green Party | 1 | | | | | |
| Independent | 11 | | | | | |
| Write-in | | | | | | |
| Total | 36 | | | 11 | Steady | 100% |

== District 1 ==
2026 Virginia's 1st congressional district election

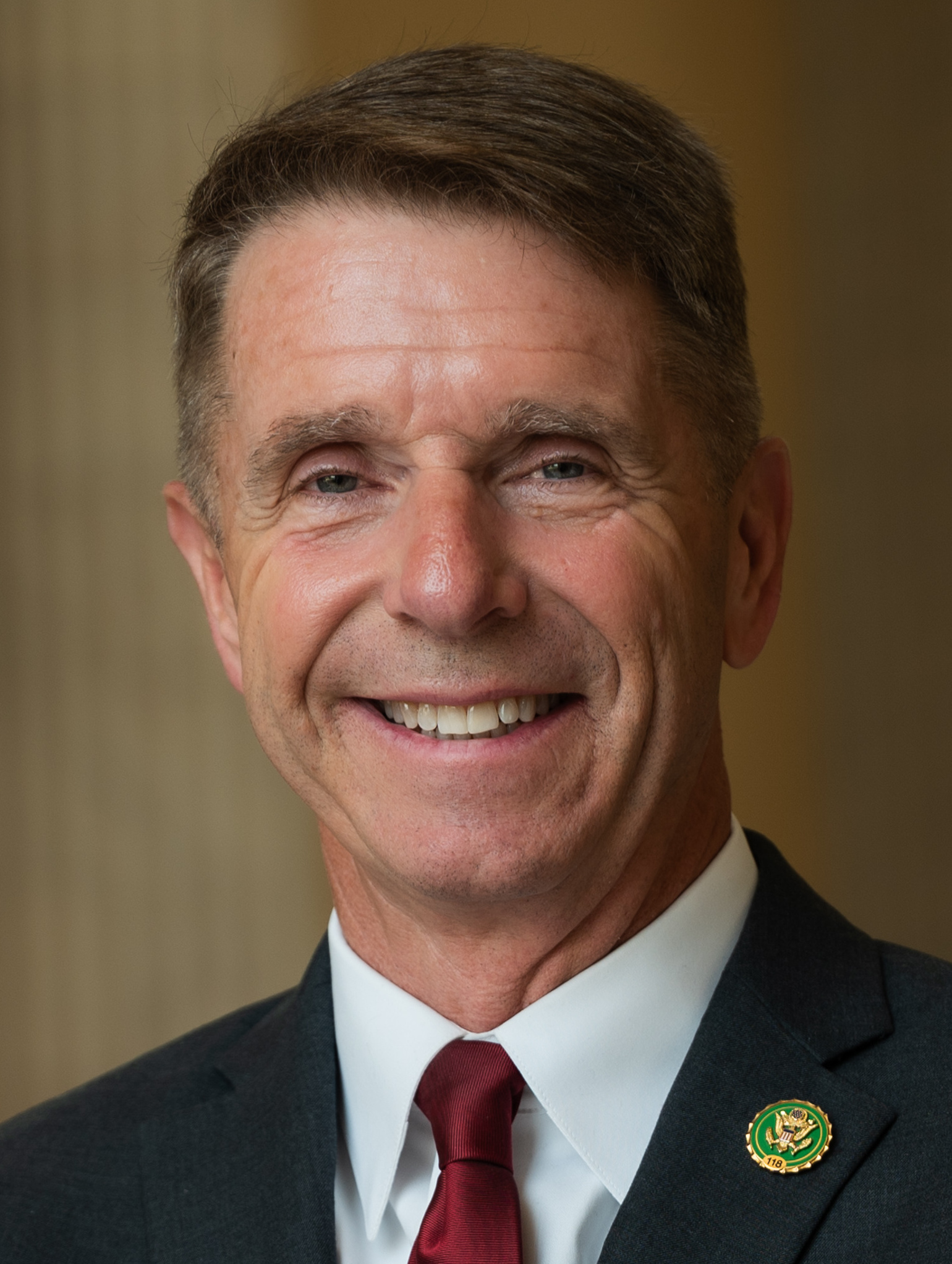
| Nominee | Shannon Taylor | Rob Wittman |
| Party | Democratic | Republican |
| Popular vote | 211,717 | 199,871 |
| Percentage | 51.31% | 48.44% |
- Taylor: 50–60% 60–70% 70–80% Wittman: 50–60% 60–70%
U.S. Representative before election
Rob Wittman
Republican
Elected U.S. Representative
Shannon Taylor
Democratic

The 1st district is based in the western Chesapeake Bay and includes portions of suburban Richmond. Within the district are western Henrico and Chesterfield counties. Other localities in the district include Colonial Beach, Mechanicsville, and Williamsburg. The incumbent is Republican Rob Wittman, who was re-elected with 56.3% of the vote in 2024.

=== Election background ===
Congressman Wittman, first elected in the 2007 special election for this seat, had not faced serious opposition from Democrats in previous election cycles. However, after President Donald Trump narrowly carried the district while losing statewide by mid-single digits in the 2024 presidential election and Democrat Abigail Spanberger won the district in the 2025 gubernatorial election, Democrats viewed Wittman as potentially vulnerable to a serious challenger.

As a result, seven Democrats filed to seek the nomination against Wittman, with Henrico County Commonwealth's Attorney Shannon Taylor ultimately winning the nomination. Some forecasters considered Wittman to be the slight favorite, but the election was considered highly competitive.

Shannon Taylor won the general election. Shannon Taylor thus became the first democrat to win Virginia's 1st congressional district since 1974.

=== Republican primary ===
==== Nominee ====
- Rob Wittman, incumbent U.S. representative

==== Endorsements ====
Rob Wittman

Executive branch officials

- Donald Trump, president of the United States (2017–2021, 2025–present)

Organizations

- AIPAC
- International Franchise Association

==== Fundraising ====
Campaign finance reports as of July 15, 2026
| Candidate | Raised | Spent | Cash on hand |
|---|---|---|---|
| Rob Wittman (R) | $4,053,141 | $1,136,232 | $4,292,789 |
Source: Federal Election Commission

=== Democratic primary ===
==== Nominee ====
- Shannon Taylor, Henrico County commonwealth's attorney (2012–present) and candidate for attorney general in 2025

==== Eliminated in primary ====
- Elizabeth Dempsey Beggs, U.S. Army veteran
- Salaam Bhatti, attorney
- Tim Cywinski, communications director
- Jason Knapp, former U.S. Navy fighter pilot and national security official
- Ericka Kopp, attorney
- Mel Tull, business lawyer

==== Withdrawn ====
- Lisa Vedernikova Khanna, corporate chief of staff
- Lewis Littlepage, retired prosecutor
- Andrew Lucchetti, attorney
- Amanda Pohl, Chesterfield County clerk of court and nominee for SD-11 in 2019
- James Shea, high school economics teacher
- Sean Sublette, meteorologist
- Eugene Vindman, U.S. representative for VA-7 (2025–present) (running in the 7th district after the 2026 Virginia redistricting amendment was struck down)

==== Endorsements ====
Salaam Bhatti

Organizations

- Progressive Victory
- Track AIPAC
Shannon Taylor

Executive branch officials

- Pete Buttigieg, former secretary of transportation (2021–2025)

U.S. senators

- Tim Kaine, Virginia (2013–present)
- Mark Warner, Virginia (2009–present)

U.S. representatives

- Don Beyer, VA-08 (2015–present)
- Suzan DelBene, WA-01 (2012–present)
- Jennifer McClellan, VA-04 (2023–present)
- Greg Stanton, AZ-04 (2019–present)
- Suhas Subramanyam, VA-10 (2025–present)
- Eugene Vindman, VA-07 (2025–present)
- James Walkinshaw, VA-11 (2025–present)

Statewide officials

- Mark Herring, former attorney general of Virginia (2014–2022)
- Terry McAuliffe, former governor of Virginia (2014–2018)
- Ralph Northam, former governor of Virginia (2018–2022)
- Abigail Spanberger, governor of Virginia (2026–present)
- Mary Sue Terry, former attorney general of Virginia (1986–1993)

State legislators

- Betsy Carr, HD-78 (2010–present)
- Creigh Deeds, SD-11 (2001–present)
- Eileen Filler-Corn, former minority leader of the Virginia House of Delegates (2019–2020, 2022) from HD-41 (2010–2024)
- Louise Lucas, president pro tempore of the Virginia Senate (2020–present) from SD-18 (1992–present)
- Delores McQuinn, HD-81 (2009–present)
- Scott Surovell, majority leader of the Virginia Senate (2024–present) from SD-34 (2016–present)
- Schuyler VanValkenburg, SD-16 (2024–present)
- Rodney Willett, HD-58 (2024–present)

Labor unions

- American Federation of Government Employees

Organizations

- Democratic Congressional Campaign Committee
- Elect Democratic Women
- EMILY's List
- End Citizens United
- Giffords
- NewDem Action Fund

==== Fundraising ====
Italics indicate a withdrawn candidate.

Campaign finance reports as of July 15, 2026
| Candidate | Raised | Spent | Cash on hand |
|---|---|---|---|
| Elizabeth Beggs (D) | $166,681 | $156,861 | $9,819 |
| Salaam Bhatti (D) | $299,388 | $253,809 | $45,579 |
| Tim Cywinski (D) | $30,966 | $12,618 | $0 |
| Lisa Vedernikova Khanna (D) | $277,648 | $277,648 | $0 |
| Jason Knapp (D) | $594,640 | $492,069 | $102,571 |
| Ericka Kopp (D) | $15,949 | $10,303 | $5,646 |
| Andrew Lucchetti (D) | $57,728 | $57,728 | $0 |
| Amanda Pohl (D) | $51,417 | $51,417 | $0 |
| James Shea (D) | $2,660 | $2,660 | $0 |
| Sean Sublette (D) | $66,110 | $66,110 | $0 |
| Shannon Taylor (D) | $2,140,930 | $1,136,750 | $1,004,179 |
| Mel Tull (D) | $289,519 | $212,054 | $77,465 |
Source: Federal Election Commission

==== Debates and forums ====
2026 Virginia's 1st congressional district Democratic primary debate
| No. | Date | Host | Moderator | Link | Democratic | Democratic | Democratic | Democratic | Democratic | Democratic | Democratic |
| Key: P Participant A Absent N Not invited I Invited W Withdrawn | | | | | | | | | | | |
| Key: P Participant A Absent N Not invited I Invited W Withdrawn | | | | | Salaam Bhatti | Elizabeth Dempsey Beggs | Tim Cywinski | Jason Knapp | Ericka Kopp | Shannon Taylor | Mel Tull |
|---|---|---|---|---|---|---|---|---|---|---|---|
| 1 | June 28, 2026 | Henrico County Democrats | Jennifer Pribble | YouTube | P | P | P | P | P | P | P |

==== Results ====
Results by county and independent city: Taylor—40–50% Taylor—50–60% Taylor—60-70%

Democratic primary results
| Party | Candidate | Votes | % |
|---|---|---|---|
| Democratic | Shannon Taylor | 25,535 | 52.8 |
| Democratic | Salaam Bhatti | 9,606 | 19.9 |
| Democratic | Jason Knapp | 4,806 | 9.9 |
| Democratic | Elizabeth Dempsey Beggs | 3,477 | 7.2 |
| Democratic | Mel Tull | 2,085 | 4.3 |
| Democratic | Tim Cywinski | 1,466 | 3.0 |
| Democratic | Ericka Kopp | 1,366 | 2.8 |
| Total votes | | 48,341 | 100.0 |

=== General election ===
==== Predictions ====
| Source | Ranking | As of |
|---|---|---|
| Decision Desk HQ | Lean R | October 1, 2026 |
| The Cook Political Report | Tossup | October 23, 2026 |
| Inside Elections | Tilt R | October 29, 2026 |
| Sabato's Crystal Ball | Lean D (flip) | November 2, 2026 |

==== Post-primary endorsements ====
Shannon Taylor (D)

Labor unions

- Association of Flight Attendants

Organizations

- Planned Parenthood Action Fund
- Virginia National Organization for Women
Rob Wittman (R)

Organizations

- National Federation of Independent Business

==== Polling ====
| Poll source | Date(s) administered | Sample size | Margin of error | Rob Wittman (R) | Shannon Taylor (D) | Other | Undecided |
|---|---|---|---|---|---|---|---|
| DCCC Targeting Team (D) | October 24–25, 2026 | 478 (LV) | ± 4.5% | 47% | 48% | — | 5% |
| Public Policy Polling (D) (Note: Poll sponsored by House Majority PAC, which is focused on electing Democrats to the U.S. House of Representatives) | October 21–22, 2026 | 570 (LV) | – | 46% | 47% | — | 7% |
| The Washington Post/SSPG | September 23–28, 2026 | 609 (LV) | ± 4.5% | 46% | 50% | 1% (Note: "Would not vote" with 1%) | 3% |
| DCCC Targeting Team (D) | September 15–17, 2026 | 519 (LV) | ± 4.3% | 47% | 46% | — | 7% |
| Public Policy Polling (D) | August 8–9, 2025 | 541 (RV) | ± 4.2% | 41% | 40% | — | 19% |

Hypothetical polling

Generic ballot

| Poll source | Date(s) administered | Sample size | Margin of error | Generic Republican | Generic Democrat | Undecided |
|---|---|---|---|---|---|---|
| DCCC Targeting Team (D) | October 24–25, 2026 | 478 (LV) | ± 4.5% | 46% | 49% | 5% |

==== Fundraising ====
Campaign finance reports as of October 14, 2026
| Candidate | Raised | Spent | Cash on hand |
|---|---|---|---|
| Rob Wittman (R) | $5,432,689 | $6,011,223 | $797,346 |
| Shannon Taylor (D) | $4,604,761 | $4,006,027 | $598,734 |
Source: Federal Election Commission

==== Results ====
2026 Virginia's 1st congressional district election
| Party | Candidate | Votes | % | ±% |
|---|---|---|---|---|
| Republican | Rob Wittman (incumbent) | | | |
| Democratic | Shannon Taylor | | | |
| Write-in | | | | |
| Total votes | | | | |

== District 2 ==
2026 Virginia's 2nd congressional district election
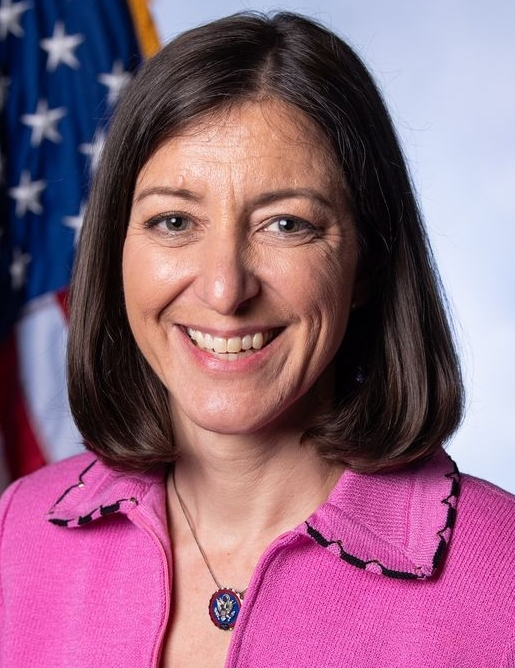

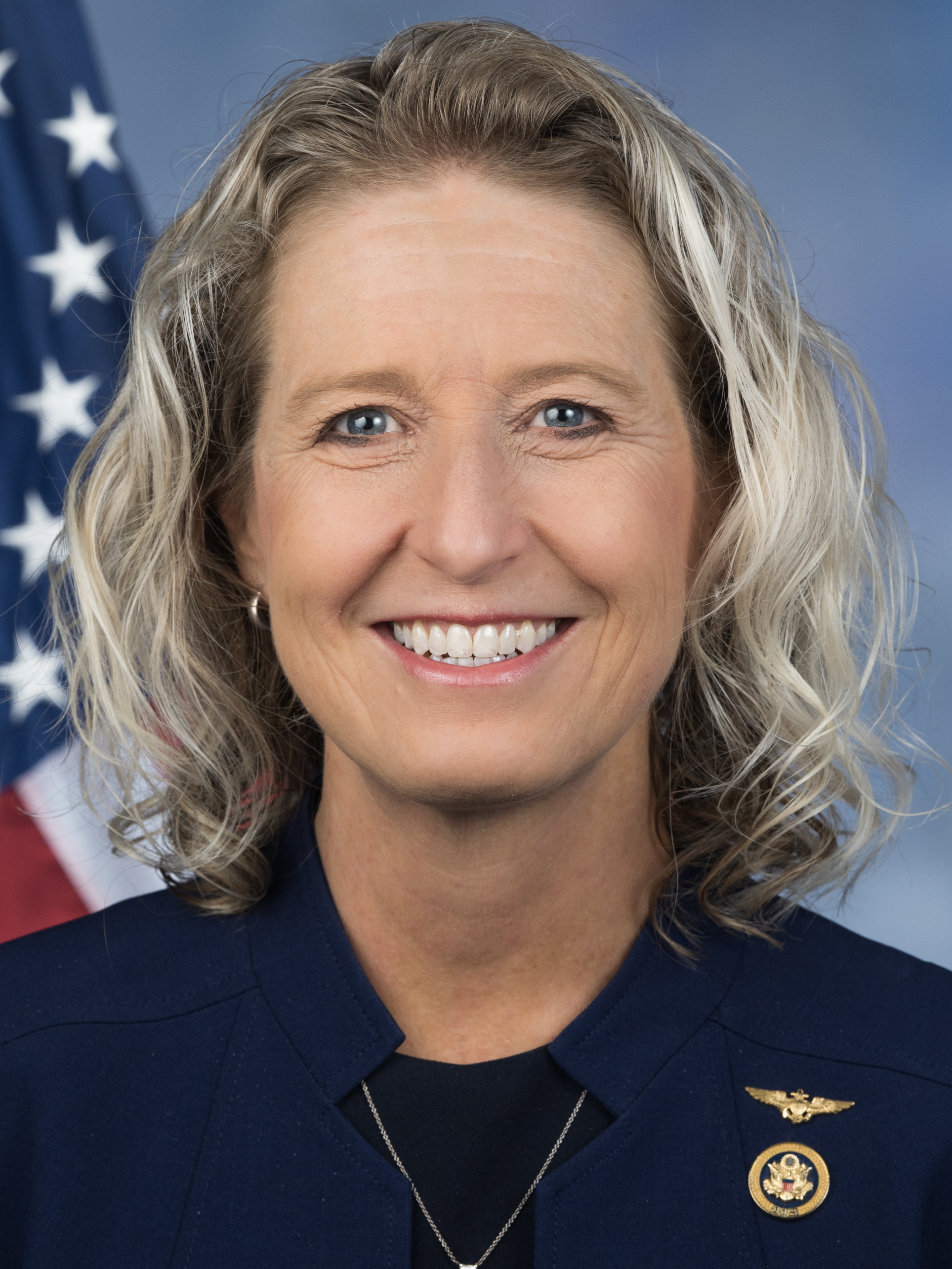
| Nominee | Elaine Luria | Jen Kiggans |
| Party | Democratic | Republican |
| Popular vote | 182,525 | 151,966 |
| Percentage | 53.22% | 44.31% |
- Luria: 50–60% 60–70% Kiggans: 40–50% 50–60% 60–70%
U.S. Representative before election
Jen Kiggans
Republican
Elected U.S. Representative
Elaine Luria
Democratic

The 2nd district is based in Hampton Roads, containing the cities of Chesapeake, Franklin, Suffolk, and Virginia Beach. Virginia's Eastern Shore is also located within the district. The incumbent is Republican Jen Kiggans, who was re-elected with 50.7% of the vote in 2024.

=== Election background ===
Virginia's 2nd congressional district is one of the most competitive districts in the country. The district has a long history of ticket splitting, with voters supporting both Democrats and Republicans on the same ballot for different offices. For instance, in 2024, Donald Trump narrowly carried the district, while Democratic Senator Tim Kaine also carried it. In 2025, Democrats Abigail Spanberger and Ghazala Hashmi won the district in their respective races, while Republican Jason Miyares carried it in his. As a result, the district has a Cook Partisan Voting Index rating of EVEN. Congresswoman Kiggans successfully defended her seat in the 2024 election. Democrats subsequently nominated former Congresswoman Elaine Luria, setting up a rematch of the 2022 election, in which then State Senator Kiggans defeated Luria for the seat. This was expected to be one of the most closely watched races in the 2026 midterms.

In May 2026, Kiggans appeared on a radio show where the radio host, Rich Herrera, criticized House minority leader Hakeem Jeffries's efforts to redraw the state's congressional districts saying, "get your cotton‑picking hands off of Virginia." Kiggans replied, "That's right. Ditto. Yes. Yes to that", receiving criticism from Democrats. Kiggans apologized and clarified her positions, in which she disagreed with the statement's connection to slavery from the host.

In September 2026, Luria sued the Virginia Department of Elections in an attempt to remove independent candidate Bishop Staten from the ballot. In the suit, Luria alleges that, despite over 600 signatures having been declared invalid, an additional 18 should also be rejected, which would bring Staten under the required threshold to appear on the ballot. Staten is running on the Democratic Socialists of America platform, though the local DSA chapter denies any affiliation with him. Staten has a long history of supporting President Trump.

=== Republican primary ===
==== Nominee ====
- Jen Kiggans, incumbent U.S. representative

==== Endorsements ====
Jen Kiggans

Executive branch officials

- Donald Trump, president of the United States (2017–2021, 2025–present)

U.S. representatives

- Mike Johnson, speaker of the House (2023–present) from LA-04 (2017–present)

Statewide officials

- Glenn Youngkin, former governor of Virginia (2022–2026)

Organizations

- AIPAC
- ClearPath Foundation
- International Franchise Association
- Log Cabin Republicans
- Maggie's List

==== Fundraising ====
Campaign finance reports as of July 15, 2026
| Candidate | Raised | Spent | Cash on hand |
|---|---|---|---|
| Jen Kiggans (R) | $5,934,338 | $2,608,075 | $3,391,740 |
Source: Federal Election Commission

=== Democratic primary ===
==== Nominee ====
- Elaine Luria, former U.S. representative (2019–2023)

==== Eliminated in primary ====
- Nila Devanath, hospital physician and former attorney
- Bill Fleming, conservation director for Virginia Dare Soil and Water Conservation District representing Virginia Beach
- Patrick Mosolf, former USAID official

==== Withdrawn ====
- James Osyf, national security executive at Lockheed Martin
- Nicolaus Sleister, security professional
- Matt Strickler, former Virginia secretary of natural resources (2018–2021)
- Burk Stringfellow, teacher
- Mike Williamson, national security strategist (running for state senate; endorsed Luria)

==== Declined ====
- Aaron Rouse, state senator from the 22nd district (2023–present) and candidate for lieutenant governor in 2025

==== Endorsements ====
Nila Devanath

Organizations

- Tidewater Democratic Socialists of America
- US Campaign for Palestinian Rights Action
Elaine Luria

Executive branch officials

- Pete Buttigieg, former secretary of transportation (2021–2025)

U.S. senators

- Tim Kaine, Virginia (2013–present)
- Mark Kelly, Arizona (2020–present)
- Mark Warner, Virginia (2009–present)

U.S. representatives

- Don Beyer, VA-08 (2015–present)
- Suzan DelBene, WA-01 (2012–present)
- Gabby Giffords, former AZ-08 (2007–2012)
- Jennifer McClellan, VA-04 (2023–present)
- Bobby Scott, VA-03 (2019–present)
- Greg Stanton, AZ-04 (2019–present)
- Suhas Subramanyam, VA-10 (2025–present)
- Eugene Vindman, VA-07, (2025–present)
- James Walkinshaw, VA-11 (2025–present)

Statewide officials

- Terry McAuliffe, former governor of Virginia (2014–2018)
- Abigail Spanberger, governor of Virginia (2026–present)

State legislators

- Louise Lucas, Senate president pro tempore (2020–present) from SD-18 (1992–present)
- Aaron Rouse, state senator from SD-22 (2023–present)
- 5 state delegates (Note: Alex Askew, HD-95 (2020–2022, 2024–present); Nadarius Clark, HD-84 (2022–2023, 2024–present); Michael Feggans, HD-97 (2024–present); Kelly Convirs-Fowler, HD-96 (2018–present); Cliff Hayes, HD-91 (2017–present))

Individuals

- Mike Williamson, national security strategist and former candidate for the seat

Labor unions

- American Federation of Government Employees
- International Federation of Professional and Technical Engineers
- Service Employees International Union Virginia State Council

Organizations

- 314 Action
- Brady PAC
- DCCC Red to Blue
- Democratic Majority for Israel
- Elect Democratic Women
- EMILYs List
- Giffords PAC
- Human Rights Campaign
- League of Conservation Voters
- National Organization for Women
- Natural Resources Defense Council Action Fund
- NewDem Action Fund
- Planned Parenthood Action Fund
- Population Connection
- VoteVets
James Osyf (withdrawn)

U.S. representatives

- Mark Takano, CA-39 (2013–present)
- Ritchie Torres, NY-15 (2021–present)

Organizations

- Equality PAC
- LGBTQ+ Victory Fund
Mike Williamson (withdrawn)

Organizations

- Center for Freethought Equality

==== Fundraising ====
Italics indicate a withdrawn candidate.

Campaign finance reports as of July 15, 2026
| Candidate | Raised | Spent | Cash on hand |
|---|---|---|---|
| Nila Devanath (D) | $275,395 | $253,256 | $22,139 |
| Elaine Luria (D) | $4,659,795 | $1,077,072 | $3,582,723 |
| Patrick Mosolf (D) | $169,271 | $68,765 | $100,507 |
Source: Federal Election Commission

==== Debates and forums ====
2026 Virginia's 2nd congressional district Democratic primary debate
| No. | Date | Host | Moderator | Link | Democratic | Democratic | Democratic | Democratic |
| Key: P Participant A Absent N Not invited I Invited W Withdrawn | | | | | | | | |
| Key: P Participant A Absent N Not invited I Invited W Withdrawn | | | | | Nila Devanath | Bill Flemming | Elaine Luria | Patrick Mosolf |
|---|---|---|---|---|---|---|---|---|
| 1 | June 24, 2026 | Cova Coalition; Indivisible | Kate Powell | YouTube | P | P | A | P |

==== Results ====
Democratic primary results
| Party | Candidate | Votes | % |
|---|---|---|---|
| Democratic | Elaine Luria | 33,658 | 80.3 |
| Democratic | Nila Devanath | 6,857 | 16.4 |
| Democratic | Bill Fleming | 855 | 2.0 |
| Democratic | Patrick Mosolf | 566 | 1.3 |
| Total votes | | 41,936 | 100.0 |

=== Independents ===
==== Declared ====
- Matt Baker, U.S. Marine veteran
- Bishop Staten, civil servant

=== General election ===
==== Predictions ====
| Source | Ranking | As of |
|---|---|---|
| Decision Desk HQ | Likely D (flip) | September 8, 2026 |
| The Cook Political Report | Lean D (flip) | October 23, 2026 |
| Inside Elections | Tilt D (flip) | October 29, 2026 |
| Sabato's Crystal Ball | Lean D (flip) | September 29, 2026 |

==== Post-primary endorsements ====
Jen Kiggans (R)

Executive branch officials

- Doug Collins, secretary of Veterans Affairs (2025–present)
- Robert F. Kennedy Jr., secretary of Health and Human Services (2025–present)
- Mehmet Oz, administrator of the Centers for Medicare and Medicaid Services (2025–present)

Organizations

- America PAC
- American Association of Nurse Anesthetists PAC
- National Federation of Independent Business
- U.S. Chamber of Commerce
Elaine Luria (D)

Statewide officials

- Wes Moore, governor of Maryland (2023–present)
- Mikie Sherrill, governor of New Jersey (2026–present)

Organizations

- Virginia National Organization for Women PAC

==== Fundraising ====
Campaign finance reports as of October 14, 2026
| Candidate | Raised | Spent | Cash on hand |
|---|---|---|---|
| Jen Kiggans (R) | $7,589,812 | $6,342,881 | $1,292,408 |
| Elaine Luria (D) | $8,044,064 | $7,565,202 | $478,862 |
Source: Federal Election Commission

==== Polling ====
| Poll source | Date(s) administered | Sample size | Margin of error | Jen Kiggans (R) | Elaine Luria (D) | Other | Undecided |
|---|---|---|---|---|---|---|---|
| Christopher Newport University | October 1–10, 2026 | 702 (LV) | ± 4.0% | 43% | 46% | 2% (Note: "Someone else" with 2%) | 10% |
| Tulchin Research (D) | July 9–13, 2026 | 700 (LV) | — | 47% | 47% | — | 6% |

==== Results ====
2026 Virginia's 2nd congressional district election
| Party | Candidate | Votes | % | ±% |
|---|---|---|---|---|
| Republican | Jen Kiggans (incumbent) | | | |
| Democratic | Elaine Luria | | | |
| Independent | Matt Baker | | | |
| Independent | Bishop Staten | | | |
| Write-in | | | | |
| Total votes | | | | |

== District 3 ==
2026 Virginia's 3rd congressional district election
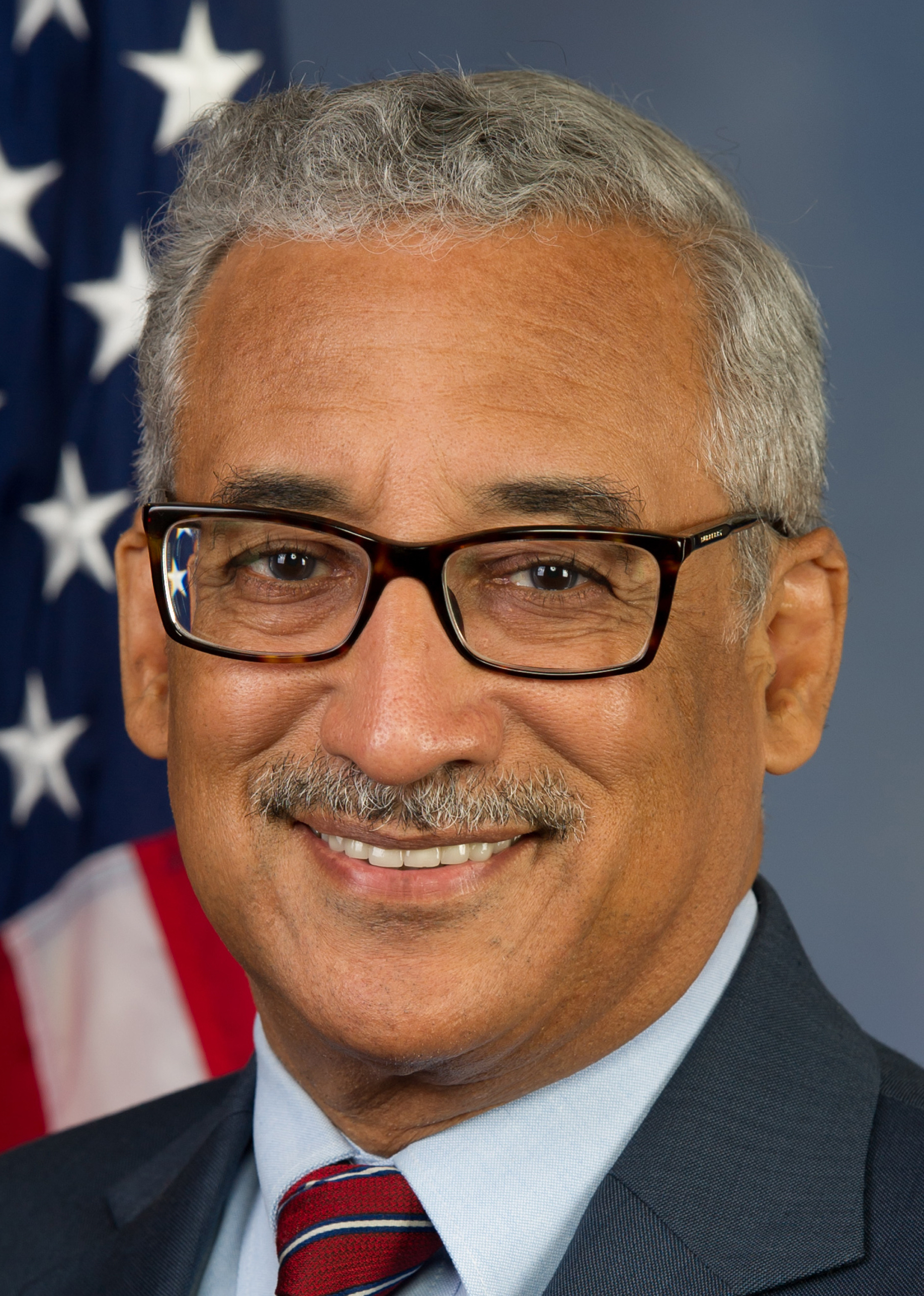

| Nominee | Bobby Scott | Edwin Rivera |
| Party | Democratic | Republican |
| Popular vote | 181,127 | 59,811 |
| Percentage | 72.62% | 23.98% |
- Scott: 60–70% 70–80%
U.S. Representative before election
Bobby Scott
Democratic
Elected U.S. Representative
TBD

The 3rd district encompasses the inner Hampton Roads, including parts of Hampton and Norfolk, as well as Newport News. The incumbent is Democrat Bobby Scott, who was re-elected with 70% of the vote in 2024.

=== Election background ===
Congressman Scott represents a safe Democratic seat and is not expected to face a serious challenge from Republicans or independents.

=== Democratic primary ===
==== Nominee ====
- Bobby Scott, incumbent U.S. representative

==== Withdrawn ====
- Justin Maffett, lawyer

==== Endorsements ====
Bobby Scott

Labor unions

- American Federation of Government Employees

Organizations

- J Street
- Planned Parenthood Action Fund

==== Fundraising ====
Campaign finance reports as of July 15, 2026
| Candidate | Raised | Spent | Cash on hand |
|---|---|---|---|
| Bobby Scott (D) | $688,200 | $659,220 | $191,843 |
Source: Federal Election Commission

=== Republican primary ===
==== Nominee ====
- Edwin Rivera, U.S. Army veteran

==== Fundraising ====
Campaign finance reports as of July 15, 2026
| Candidate | Raised | Spent | Cash on hand |
|---|---|---|---|
| Edwin Rivera (R) | $6,555 | $4,793 | $1,762 |
Source: Federal Election Commission

=== Independent candidates ===
==== Declared ====
- Makiba Gaines, attorney
- Steve Woll, U.S. Navy veteran

==== Withdrawn ====
- Dawn Vasquez

==== Fundraising ====
Italics indicate a withdrawn candidate.

Campaign finance reports as of August 28, 2025
| Candidate | Raised | Spent | Cash on hand |
|---|---|---|---|
| Dawn Vasquez (I) | $23,924 | $23,924 | $0 |
Source: Federal Election Commission

=== General election ===
==== Predictions ====
| Source | Ranking | As of |
|---|---|---|
| Decision Desk HQ | Safe D | July 14, 2026 |
| The Cook Political Report | Solid D | April 21, 2026 |
| Inside Elections | Solid D | April 21, 2026 |
| Sabato's Crystal Ball | Safe D | April 21, 2026 |

==== Post-primary endorsements ====
Bobby Scott (D)

Labor unions

- National Education Association

Organizations

- Humane World Action Fund
- Virginia National Organization for Women PAC

==== Fundraising ====
Campaign finance reports as of September 30, 2026
| Candidate | Raised | Spent | Cash on hand |
|---|---|---|---|
| Bobby Scott (D) | $846,726 | $874,412 | $138,996 |
| Edwin Rivera (R) | $14,834 | $8,669 | $6,165 |
Source: Federal Election Commission

==== Results ====
2026 Virginia's 3rd congressional district election
| Party | Candidate | Votes | % | ±% |
|---|---|---|---|---|
| Democratic | Bobby Scott (incumbent) | | | |
| Republican | Edwin Rivera | | | |
| Independent | Makiba Gaines | | | |
| Independent | Steve Woll | | | |
| Write-in | | | | |
| Total votes | | | | |

== District 4 ==
2026 Virginia's 4th congressional district election
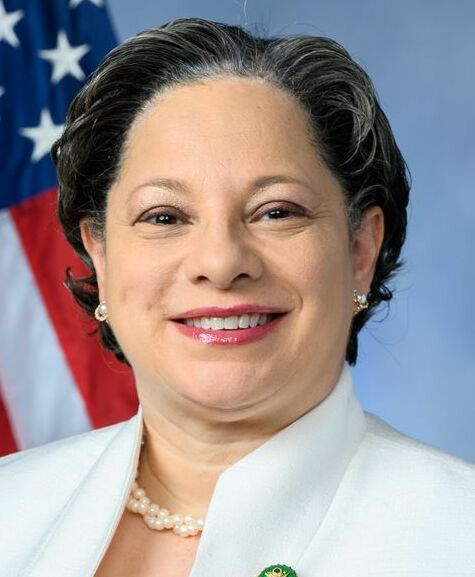

| Nominee | Jennifer McClellan | Robert Murray |
| Party | Democratic | Republican |
| Popular vote | 228,362 | 81,573 |
| Percentage | 72.51% | 25.90% |
- McClellan: 50–60% 60–70% 70–80% 80–90% Murray: 50–60%
U.S. Representative before election
Jennifer McClellan
Democratic
Elected U.S. Representative
Jennifer McClellan
Democratic

The 4th district takes in the city of Richmond and portions of Southside Virginia following Interstate 95. Within the district are the cities of Colonial Heights, Emporia, Hopewell, and Petersburg. The incumbent is Democrat Jennifer McClellan, who was re-elected with 67.3% of the vote in 2024.

=== Election background ===
Congresswoman McClellan represents a safe Democratic seat and is not expected to face a serious challenge from Republicans or independents.

=== Democratic primary ===
==== Nominee ====
- Jennifer McClellan, incumbent U.S. representative

==== Endorsements ====
Jennifer McClellan

Labor unions

- American Federation of Government Employees

Organizations

- J Street
- Jewish Democratic Council of America
- League of Conservation Voters Action Fund
- Planned Parenthood Action Fund
- Population Connection
- Vote Mama

==== Fundraising ====
Campaign finance reports as of July 15, 2026
| Candidate | Raised | Spent | Cash on hand |
|---|---|---|---|
| Jennifer McClellan (D) | $1,135,225 | $991,901 | $197,426 |
Source: Federal Election Commission

=== Republican primary ===
==== Nominee ====
- Robert Murray, former CIO advisory leader for IBM

=== Independents ===
==== Declared ====
- Joan Andrews Bell, anti-abortion activist and convicted felon

=== General election ===
==== Predictions ====
| Source | Ranking | As of |
|---|---|---|
| Decision Desk HQ | Safe D | July 14, 2026 |
| The Cook Political Report | Solid D | April 21, 2026 |
| Inside Elections | Solid D | April 21, 2026 |
| Sabato's Crystal Ball | Safe D | April 21, 2026 |

==== Post-primary endorsements ====
Jennifer McClellan (D)

Labor unions

- National Education Association

Organizations

- Humane World Action Fund
- Virginia National Organization for Women PAC

==== Fundraising ====
Campaign finance reports as of September 30, 2026
| Candidate | Raised | Spent | Cash on hand |
|---|---|---|---|
| Jennifer McClellan (D) | $1,497,688 | $1,345,438 | $206,332 |
| Robert Murray (R) | $1,228 | $27 | $1,201 |
Source: Federal Election Commission

==== Results ====
2026 Virginia's 4th congressional district election
| Party | Candidate | Votes | % | ±% |
|---|---|---|---|---|
| Democratic | Jennifer McClellan (incumbent) | | | |
| Republican | Robert Murray | | | |
| Independent | Joan Andrews Bell | | | |
| Write-in | | | | |
| Total votes | | | | |

== District 5 ==
2026 Virginia's 5th congressional district election
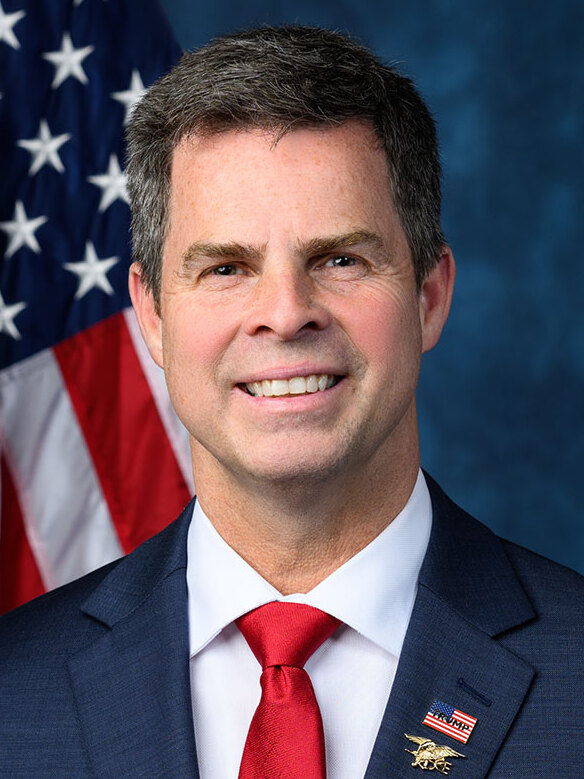

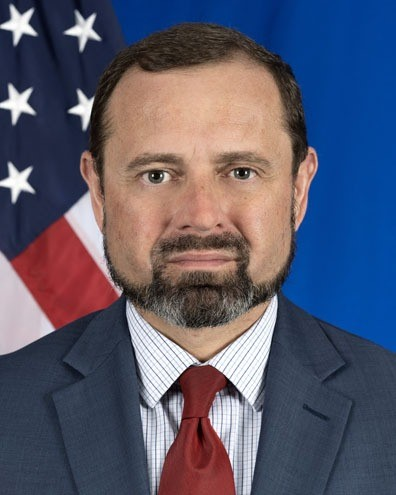
| Nominee | John McGuire | Tom Perriello |
| Party | Republican | Democratic |
| Popular vote | 184,141 | 178,393 |
| Percentage | 49.87% | 48.31% |
- McGuire: 50–60% 60–70% 70–80% Perriello: 40–50% 50–60% 60–70% 70–80% 80–90%
U.S. Representative before election
John McGuire
Republican
Elected U.S. Representative
John McGuire
Republican

The 5th district encompasses the majority of rural Southside Virginia, including the cities of Charlottesville, Danville, and Lynchburg. The incumbent is Republican John McGuire, who was elected with 57.3% of the vote in 2024.

=== Election background ===
Despite the 5th district being a strong Republican bastion that has continued to back Republicans even amid double-digit statewide losses, such as in the 2025 elections, the DCCC placed the district on its list of targeted seats to flip. Congressman McGuire, a freshman member of the House, won this seat with 57.3% of the vote in the last election after narrowly ousting former Congressman Bob Good in a primary. Democrats nominated former Congressman Tom Perriello, who held this seat for one term from 2009 to 2011. Prior to the election, the race was expected to favor McGuire, but predictors were hesitant to rate the seat as safe due to Perriello outraising McGuire. If Perriello had won, he would have been the fifth different representative for this seat in the last six election cycles. McGuire refused to debate Perriello, stating that he would not debate unless "he [Perriello] needs to go on national TV and apologize for accusing me of insider trading."

=== Republican primary ===
==== Nominee ====
- John McGuire, incumbent U.S. representative

==== Eliminated in primary ====
- Melanie Lucero, real estate agent

==== Endorsements ====
John McGuire

Executive branch officials

- Donald Trump, president of the United States (2017–2021, 2025–present)

Statewide officials

- Glenn Youngkin, former governor of Virginia (2022–2026)

State legislators

- Wendell Walker, HD–52 (2020–present)

Organizations

- AIPAC
- International Franchise Association

==== Fundraising ====
Campaign finance reports as of July 15, 2026
| Candidate | Raised | Spent | Cash on hand |
|---|---|---|---|
| Bob Good (R) | $44,968 | $42,876 | $6,463 |
| Melanie Lucero (R) | $88,298 | $80,477 | $7,821 |
| John McGuire (R) | $1,781,840 | $1,291,655 | $524,404 |
Source: Federal Election Commission

==== Results ====
Republican primary results
| Party | Candidate | Votes | % |
|---|---|---|---|
| Republican | John McGuire (incumbent) | 42,286 | 84.2 |
| Republican | Melanie Lucero | 7,914 | 15.8 |
| Total votes | | 50,200 | 100.0 |

=== Democratic primary ===
==== Nominee ====
- Tom Perriello, former special envoy for Sudan (2024–2025), former U.S. representative (2009–2011)

==== Eliminated in primary ====
- Suzanne Krzyzanowski, physician
- Robert Tracinski, political commentator

==== Withdrawn ====
- Gabriella Bedsworth, screenwriter
- Salaam Bhatti, attorney (ran in 1st district after redistricting struck down)
- Mike Pruitt, Albemarle County supervisor (endorsed Perriello)
- Paul Riley, defense contractor and candidate for this district in 2024
- Adele Stichel, attorney
- Shannon Taylor, Henrico County commonwealth's attorney (2012–present) and candidate for attorney general in 2025 (running in 1st district after redistricting struck down)
- Kate Zabriskie, corporate training firm owner

==== Endorsements ====
Tom Perriello

Executive branch officials

- Pete Buttigieg, former secretary of transportation (2021–2025)

U.S. senators

- Tim Kaine, Virginia (2013–present)
- Mark Warner, Virginia (2009–present)
- Elizabeth Warren, Massachusetts (2013–present)

U.S. representatives

- Greg Casar, TX-35 (2023–present) and chair of the Congressional Progressive Caucus
- Maxwell Frost, FL-10 (2023–present)
- Pramila Jayapal, WA-07 (2017–present)

Statewide officials

- Ghazala Hashmi, lieutenant governor of Virginia (2026–present)
- Ralph Northam, former governor of Virginia (2018–2022)
- Abigail Spanberger, governor of Virginia (2026–present)

Individuals

- Mike Pruitt, Albemarle County supervisor and former candidate for this district

Organizations

- Congressional Progressive Caucus PAC
- End Citizens United
- J Street PAC

==== Fundraising ====
Italics indicate a withdrawn candidate.

Campaign finance reports as of July 22, 2026
| Candidate | Raised | Spent | Cash on hand |
|---|---|---|---|
| Suzanne Krzyzanowski (D) | $16,897 | $10,519 | $6,378 |
| Tom Perriello (D) | $2,140,401 | $629,110 | $1,511,291 |
| Mike Pruitt (D) | $432,665 | $340,427 | $92,238 |
| Paul Riley (D) | $3,245 | $19,812 | $0 |
| Adele Stichel (D) | $105,237 | $105,237 | $0 |
| Robert Tracinski (D) | $54,103 | $52,229 | $17,529 |
| Kate Zabriskie (D) | $47,155 | $47,155 | $0 |
Source: Federal Election Commission

==== Results ====
Democratic primary results
| Party | Candidate | Votes | % |
|---|---|---|---|
| Democratic | Tom Perriello | 30,112 | 79.8 |
| Democratic | Suzanne Kryzanowski | 5,483 | 14.5 |
| Democratic | Robert Tracinski | 2,160 | 5.7 |
| Total votes | | 37,755 | 100.0 |

=== Independents ===
==== Declared ====
- Cooke Harvey, vocational therapist

=== General election ===
==== Predictions ====
| Source | Ranking | As of |
|---|---|---|
| Decision Desk HQ | Lean R | October 20, 2026 |
| The Cook Political Report | Lean R | November 2, 2026 |
| Inside Elections | Lean R | October 29, 2026 |
| Sabato's Crystal Ball | Lean D (flip) | November 2, 2026 |

==== Post-primary endorsements ====
John McGuire (R)

Organizations

- National Federation of Independent Business
Tom Perriello (D)

U.S. representatives

- Suzan DelBene, WA-01 (2012–present)
- Jennifer McClellan, VA-04 (2023–present)
- Alexandria Ocasio-Cortez, NY-14 (2019–present)
- Denver Riggleman, former VA-05 (2019–2021) (Independent, elected as a Republican)

Statewide officials

- Wes Moore, governor of Maryland (2023–present)

Labor unions

- American Federation of Government Employees
- National Education Association
- Virginia AFL-CIO

Organizations

- DCCC Red to Blue
- League of Conservation Voters Action Fund
- National Organization for Women PAC
- Planned Parenthood Action Fund
- Reproductive Freedom for All

==== Fundraising ====
Campaign finance reports as of October 14, 2026
| Candidate | Raised | Spent | Cash on hand |
|---|---|---|---|
| John McGuire (R) | $2,419,702 | $2,071,868 | $382,053 |
| Tom Perriello (D) | $3,762,301 | $3,078,135 | $684,166 |
Source: Federal Election Commission

==== Polling ====
| Poll source | Date(s) administered | Sample size | Margin of error | John McGuire (R) | Tom Perriello (D) | Other | Undecided |
|---|---|---|---|---|---|---|---|
| Expedition Strategies (D) (Note: Poll conducted on behalf of Perriello's campaign) | September 21–24, 2026 | 400 (LV) | ± 4.9% | 46% (Note: With voters who lean towards a given candidate) | 45% | 6% (Note: Cooke Harvey (I) with 6%) | 3% |
| The Washington Post/SSPG | September 23–28, 2026 | 600 (LV) | ± 4.6% | 51% | 45% | 2% (Note: "Would not vote" with 1%; "Someone else" with 1%) | 2% |
| Expedition Strategies (D) | July 29 – August 1, 2026 | 602 (LV) | ± 3.99% | 47% | 44% | – | 9% |

Hypothetical polling

Generic ballot

| Poll source | Date(s) administered | Sample size | Margin of error | Generic Republican | Generic Democrat | Undecided |
|---|---|---|---|---|---|---|
| Expedition Strategies (D) | September 21–24, 2026 | 400 (LV) | ± 4.9% | 46% | 48% | 6% |

==== Results ====
2026 Virginia's 5th congressional district election
| Party | Candidate | Votes | % | ±% |
|---|---|---|---|---|
| Republican | John McGuire (incumbent) | 184,141 | 49.9 | −7.4 |
| Democratic | Tom Perriello | 178,393 | 48.3 | +6.0 |
| Independent | Cooke Harvey | 5,992 | 1.6 | +1.6 |
| Write-in | | 749 | 0.2 | |
| Total votes | | 369,275 | 99 | |

== District 6 ==
2026 Virginia's 6th congressional district election
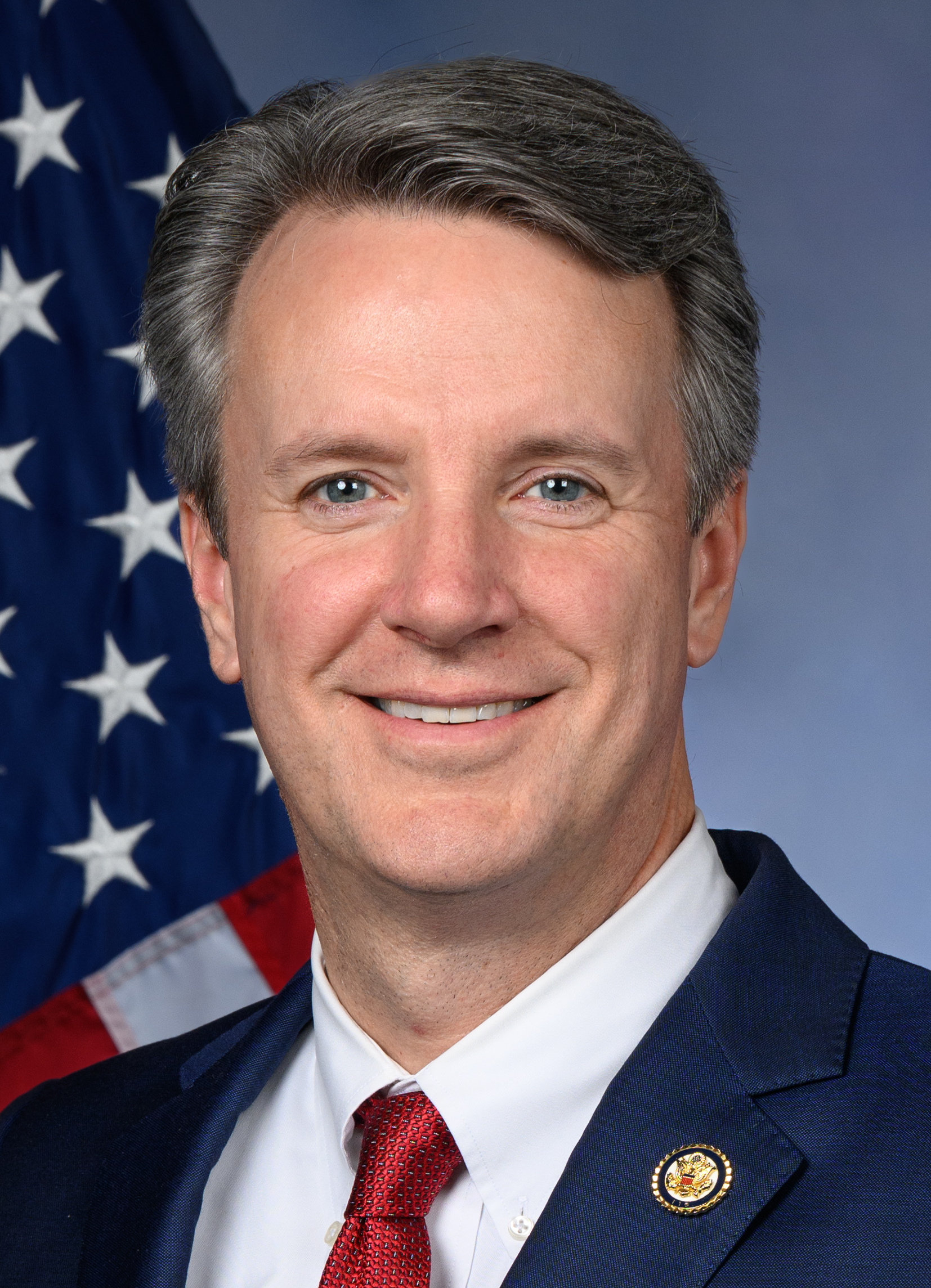

| Nominee | Ben Cline | Beth Macy |
| Party | Republican | Democratic |
| Popular vote | 177,102 | 144,103 |
| Percentage | 55.03% | 44.78% |
- Cline: 50–60% 60–70% 70–80% Macy: 50–60% 60–70% 70–80%
U.S. Representative before election
Ben Cline
Republican
Elected U.S. Representative
Ben Cline
Republican

The 6th district is located in western Virginia taking in the Shenandoah Valley along Interstate 81. The district is anchored at the southern end by the cities of Roanoke and Salem. The incumbent is Republican Ben Cline, who was re-elected with 63.1% of the vote in 2024.

=== Election background ===
Although Democrat Beth Macy has outraised Congressman Cline, the 6th district is even more Republican than its counterpart in the 5th. As a result, the DCCC initially had not place the seat on its targeted list of seats to flip, and Congressman Cline had not been expected to face a serious challenge. However, on October 2, the DCCC added this district to its target list.

=== Republican primary ===
==== Nominee ====
- Ben Cline, incumbent U.S. representative

==== Endorsements ====
Ben Cline

Executive branch officials

- Donald Trump, president of the United States (2017–2021, 2025–present)

Organizations

- AIPAC
- Freedom Caucus Fund
- International Franchise Association

==== Fundraising ====
Campaign finance reports as of July 15, 2026
| Candidate | Raised | Spent | Cash on hand |
|---|---|---|---|
| Ben Cline (R) | $1,441,436 | $1,058,317 | $711,442 |
Source: Federal Election Commission

=== Democratic primary ===
==== Nominee ====
- Beth Macy, author and journalist

==== Withdrawn ====
- Pete Barlow, former emergency manager for FEMA
- Wendy Gooditis, former state delegate from the 10th district (2018–2024)
- Ken Mitchell, farmer and nominee for this district in 2024
- Hugh Murray, attorney

==== Declined ====
- Sam Rasoul, state delegate from the 38th district (2014–present), nominee for this district in 2008, and candidate for Lieutenant Governor in 2021

==== Endorsements ====
Beth Macy

U.S. senators

- Tim Kaine, Virginia (2013–present)

U.S. representatives

- Ro Khanna, CA-17 (2017–present)

Statewide officials

- Abigail Spanberger, governor of Virginia (2026–present)

Individuals

- Michael Keaton, actor
Wendy Gooditis (withdrawn)

U.S. representatives

- Jennifer Wexton, former VA-10 (2019–2025)

State legislators

- Eileen Filler-Corn, former speaker of the Virginia House of Delegates (2020–2022) from HD-41 (2010–2024)
- 2 state senators (Note: Adam Ebbin, SD-39 (2012–present); Dave Marsden, SD-35 (2010–present))
- 3 state delegates (Note: Paul Krizek, HD-16 (2016–present); Ken Plum, former HD-36 (1982–2024); Debra Rodman, former HD-73 (2018–2020))

Local officials

- Juli Briskman, Loudoun County supervisor (2020–present)

==== Fundraising ====
Campaign finance reports as of July 15, 2026
| Candidate | Raised | Spent | Cash on hand |
|---|---|---|---|
| Pete Barlow (D) | $130,990 | $123,762 | $7,227 |
| Beth Macy (D) | $1,686,322 | $838,852 | $847,470 |
| Ken Mitchell (D) | $179,514 | $210,238 | $23,049 |
Source: Federal Election Commission

=== General election ===
==== Predictions ====
| Source | Ranking | As of |
|---|---|---|
| Decision Desk HQ | Safe R | July 14, 2026 |
| The Cook Political Report | Solid R | May 8, 2026 |
| Inside Elections | Solid R | May 8, 2026 |
| Sabato's Crystal Ball | Safe R | May 8, 2026 |

==== Post-primary endorsements ====
Ben Cline (R)

Organizations

- National Federation of Independent Business
Beth Macy (D)

Executive branch officials

- Barack Obama, president of the United States (2009–2017)

U.S. representatives

- Pramila Jayapal, WA-7 (2017–present)

Organizations

- Planned Parenthood Action Fund

==== Fundraising ====
Campaign finance reports as of September 30, 2026
| Candidate | Raised | Spent | Cash on hand |
|---|---|---|---|
| Ben Cline (R) | $1,861,291 | $1,485,777 | $703,836 |
| Beth Macy (D) | $2,634,642 | $2,109,504 | $525,139 |
Source: Federal Election Commission

==== Polling ====
| Poll source | Date(s) administered | Sample size | Margin of error | Ben Cline (R) | Beth Macy (D) | Other | Undecided |
|---|---|---|---|---|---|---|---|
| co/efficient (R) | September 28–30, 2026 | 791 (LV) | ± 3.47% | 59% | 29% | — | 12% |

==== Results ====
2026 Virginia's 6th congressional district election
| Party | Candidate | Votes | % | ±% |
|---|---|---|---|---|
| Republican | Ben Cline (incumbent) | | | |
| Democratic | Beth Macy | | | |
| Write-in | | | | |
| Total votes | | | | |

== District 7 ==
2026 Virginia's 7th congressional district election
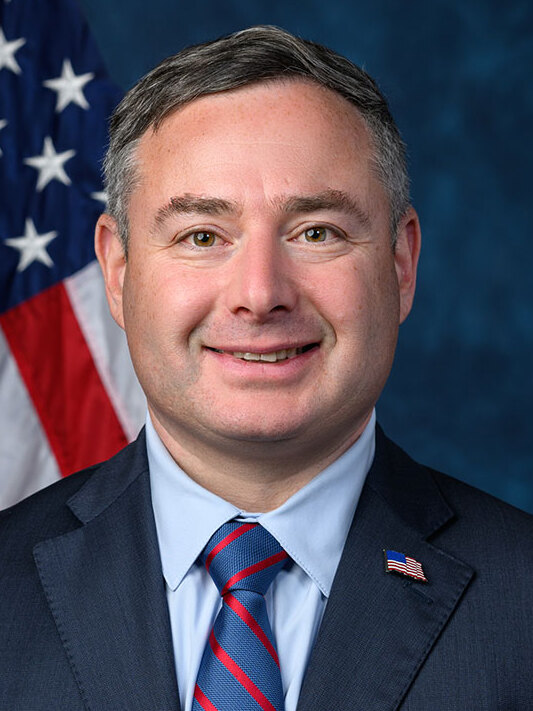

| Nominee | Eugene Vindman | Doug Ollivant |
| Party | Democratic | Republican |
| Popular vote | 196,096 | 122,199 |
| Percentage | 60.00% | 37.39% |
- Vindman: 50–60% 70–80% Ollivant: 50–60% 60–70%
U.S. Representative before election
Eugene Vindman
Democratic
Elected U.S. Representative
Eugene Vindman
Democratic

The 7th district is based in suburban, exurban, and rural areas of Northern and Central Virginia. The district contains Bowling Green, Culpeper, the city of Fredericksburg, Spotsylvania, Stafford, Stanardsville, Woodbridge, and a small sliver of Albemarle County. The incumbent is Democrat Eugene Vindman, who was elected with 51.2% of the vote in 2024.

=== Election background ===
The NRCC has placed the 7th district on its list of seats to target and flip. Its strategy is to attempt to tie incumbent freshman Congressman Vindman to Governor Abigail Spanberger in hopes of stirring resentment among rural portions of the district over Democrats' failed redistricting attempt. Vindman is also a polarizing figure within his own party, as he has broken party ranks to vote with Republicans on legislation such as the Laken Riley Act, the Protect Economic and Academic Freedom Act, and H.R. 2616 (also known as the Stopping Indoctrination and Protecting Kids Act). These votes have drawn criticism from the progressive wing of the party, particularly among immigrant, pro-Palestinian, and transgender activists. He faces Republican nominee Doug Ollivant, who formerly served on the United States National Security Council under President George W. Bush. The race is expected to favor Vindman, as the district narrowly voted yes on the redistricting amendment; however, six candidates appear on the ballot for the general election. Including 2024 Constitution Party presidential nominee Randall Terry.

A forum was scheduled to be held at the University of Mary Washington. Vindman declined to participate, while three other candidates, including Ollivant, agreed to attend. The forum was initially scheduled for September 15 but was rescheduled for the following week, on September 22. Prior to the date of the forum, Ollivant withdrew, citing personal health issues. The event was then canceled outright. On October 5, Ollivant announced that he had been diagnosed with a treatable form of acute myeloid leukemia. Despite the cancer diagnosis, Ollivant remained committed to staying in the race.

=== Democratic primary ===
==== Nominee ====
- Eugene Vindman, incumbent U.S. representative (2025–present)

==== Withdrawn ====
- J.P. Cooney, former federal prosecutor
- Elizabeth Guzmán, state delegate from the 22nd district (2026–present) and 31st district (2018–2022), candidate for this district in 2024, and candidate for state senate in 2023
- Dan Helmer, state delegate for the 10th district (2020–present) and candidate for the 10th congressional district in 2018 and 2024
- Dorothy McAuliffe, former first lady of Virginia (2014–2018)
- Adele McClure, state delegate from the 2nd district (2024–present)
- Matthew Rainforth
- Saddam Salim, state senator from the 37th district (2024–present)
- Joe Schiarizzi, affordable housing activist
- Jonathan Schmeelk
- Alex Thymmons, veteran
- Olivia Troye, former Homeland Security and Counterterrorism advisor to Vice President Mike Pence

==== Endorsements ====
Dan Helmer (withdrawn)

U.S. representatives

- Max Rose, former NY-11 (2019–2021)
- Eugene Vindman, VA-7 (2025–present) (Note: Vindman had planned for re-election in the 1st district had the 2026 Virginia redistricting amendment not been struck down.)

Statewide officials

- Ralph Northam, former governor of Virginia (2018–2022)

State legislators

- 40 state legislators
Eugene Vindman

Labor unions

- American Federation of Government Employees

Organizations

- Brady Campaign
- Council for a Livable World
- End Citizens United
- Giffords
- Jewish Democratic Council of America
- Joint Action Committee for Political Affairs
- League of Conservation Voters Action Fund
- Planned Parenthood Action Fund
- Reproductive Freedom for All
Dorothy McAuliffe (withdrawn)

U.S. representatives

- Nancy Pelosi, former speaker of the House (2007–2011, 2019–2023) from CA-11 (1987–present)

Statewide officials

- Anne Holton, former education secretary of Virginia (2014–2016)
- Mary Sue Terry, former attorney general of Virginia (1986–1993)

State legislators

- Eileen Filler-Corn, former speaker of the Virginia House of Delegates (2020–2022) from HD-41 (2010–2024)
- Louise Lucas, president pro tempore of the Virginia Senate (2020–present) from SD-18 (1992–present)

Individuals

- Lynda Bird Johnson Robb, former first lady of Virginia (1982–1986)
- Pamela Northam, former first lady of Virginia (2018–2022)

==== Fundraising ====
Italics indicate a withdrawn candidate.

Campaign finance reports as of July 15, 2026
| Candidate | Raised | Spent | Cash on hand |
|---|---|---|---|
| J.P. Cooney (D) | $641,665 | $459,208 | $182,456 |
| Dan Helmer (D) | $849,251 | $513,644 | $335,607 |
| Dorothy McAuliffe (D) | $1,256,357 | $558,170 | $698,187 |
| Eugene Vindman (D) | $12,355,664 | $5,917,504 | $6,573,093 |
Source: Federal Election Commission

==== Polling ====
Hypothetical polling

| Poll source | Date(s) administered | Sample size | Margin of error | J.P. Cooney | Elizabeth Guzmán | Dan Helmer | Adele McClure | Alfonso Lopez | Saddam Salim | Other | Undecided |
|---|---|---|---|---|---|---|---|---|---|---|---|
| Change Research (D) (Note: Poll sponsored by Free and Fair Democracy PAC) | February 24–26, 2026 | 360 (LV) | ± 5.5% | 5% | 14% | 4% | 4% | 4% | 5% | 3% (Note: "Would not vote" with 3%) | 63% |

=== Republican primary ===
==== Nominee ====
- Doug Ollivant, former director for Iraq at the U.S. National Security Council

==== Eliminated in primary ====
- Philip Harding, United Pentecostal Church International Minister, entrepreneur
- Ricky Smithers, pastor

==== Withdrawn ====
- Tara Durant, state senator from the 27th district (2024–present)
- John Gray, accountant and nominee for HD-25 in 2023
- Darius Mayfield, talent manager and nominee for New Jersey's 12th congressional district in 2022 and 2024
- Alex Thymmons, Afghan war veteran (ran as a Democrat)

==== Failed to qualify for ballot ====
- Jacob Roginsky, perennial candidate
- Waverly Washington, U.S. Army reservist

==== Endorsements ====
Doug Ollivant

U.S. representatives

- Frank Wolf, former VA-10 (1981–2015)
Tara Durant (withdrawn)

U.S. representatives

- Jen Kiggans, VA-02 (2023–present)
- John McGuire, VA-05 (2025–present)

Organizations

- Maggie's List

==== Fundraising ====
Italics indicate a withdrawn candidate.

Campaign finance reports as of July 15, 2026
| Candidate | Raised | Spent | Cash on hand |
|---|---|---|---|
| Tara Durant (R) | $392,454 | $290,116 | $102,338 |
| John Gray (R) | $237,671 | $171,937 | $65,734 |
| Darius Mayfield (R) | $34,760 | $34,096 | $663 |
| Douglas Ollivant (R) | $251,134 | $185,334 | $65,801 |
Source: Federal Election Commission

==== Debates and forums ====
2026 Virginia's 7th congressional district Republican primary debate
| No. | Date | Host | Moderator | Link | Republican | Republican | Republican |
| Key: P Participant A Absent N Not invited I Invited W Withdrawn | | | | | | | |
| Key: P Participant A Absent N Not invited I Invited W Withdrawn | | | | | Phillip Harding | Doug Ollivant | Ricky Smithers |
|---|---|---|---|---|---|---|---|
| 1 | June 23, 2026 | Culpeper County Republican Committee | Madison Downs | YouTube | P | P | P |

==== Results ====
Republican primary results
| Party | Candidate | Votes | % |
|---|---|---|---|
| Republican | Doug Ollivant | 13,594 | 56.6 |
| Republican | Phillip Harding | 7,356 | 30.6 |
| Republican | Ricky Smithers | 3,076 | 12.8 |
| Total votes | | 24,026 | 100.0 |

=== Third party and independents ===
==== Declared ====
- Alaha Ahrar (Independent), non-profit CEO
- Joshua Ertle (Independent), video and audio producer
- Taner Lopez (Libertarian), author
- Randall Terry (Independent), anti-abortion activist, Constitution Party nominee for president in 2024, and perennial candidate

=== General election ===
==== Predictions ====
| Source | Ranking | As of |
|---|---|---|
| Decision Desk HQ | Likely D | July 14, 2026 |
| The Cook Political Report | Likely D | May 8, 2026 |
| Inside Elections | Solid D | October 29, 2026 |
| Sabato's Crystal Ball | Safe D | October 27, 2026 |

==== Post-primary endorsements ====
Eugene Vindman (D)

U.S. representatives

- Bobby Scott VA-03 (1993–present)

Statewide officials

- Abigail Spanberger, governor of Virginia (2026–present)

State delegates

- Andrea Bailey, New York's AD-133 (2025–present)
- Briana Sewell, HD-25 (2024–present)

Labor unions

- Amalgamated Transit Union
- United Mine Workers of America

Organizations

- CASA in Action
- Congressional Hispanic Caucus BOLD PAC
- Humane World Action Fund
- National Education Association
- VoteVets

==== Fundraising ====
Campaign finance reports as of September 30, 2026
| Candidate | Raised | Spent | Cash on hand |
|---|---|---|---|
| Eugene Vindman (D) | $15,541,178 | $9,848,367 | $5,827,745 |
| Doug Ollivant (R) | $377,922 | $261,362 | $116,560 |
Source: Federal Election Commission

==== Results ====
2026 Virginia's 7th congressional district election
| Party | Candidate | Votes | % | ±% |
|---|---|---|---|---|
| Democratic | Eugene Vindman (incumbent) | | | |
| Republican | Doug Ollivant | | | |
| Independent | Alaha Ahrar | | | |
| Independent | Joshua Ertle | | | |
| Libertarian | Taner Lopez | | | |
| Independent | Randall Terry | | | |
| Write-in | | | | |
| Total votes | | | | |

== District 8 ==
2026 Virginia's 8th congressional district election
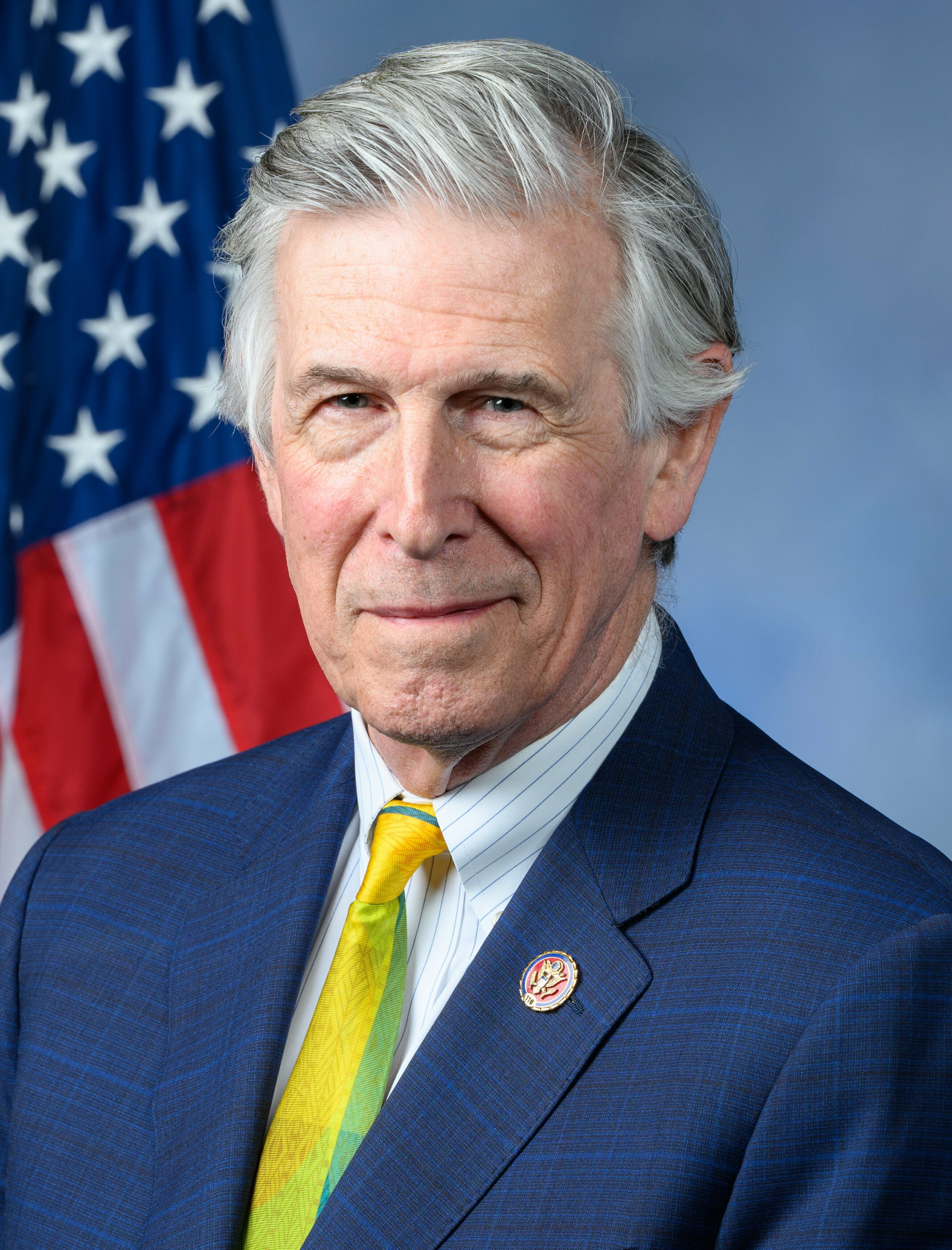

| Nominee | Don Beyer | Tony Sabio |
| Party | Democratic | Republican |
| Popular vote | 256,153 | 57,420 |
| Percentage | 79.47% | 17.81% |
- Beyer: 70–80% 80–90%
U.S. Representative before election
Don Beyer
Democratic
Elected U.S. Representative
Don Beyer
Democratic

The 8th district is located in Northern Virginia and includes populous cities and suburbs, such as the cities of Alexandria and Falls Church, the entirety of Arlington, and parts of eastern Fairfax County. The incumbent is Democrat Don Beyer, who was re-elected with 71.5% of the vote in 2024.

=== Election background ===
Congressman Beyer represents a safe Democratic seat and is not expected to face a serious challenge from Republicans, third parties, or independents.

=== Democratic primary ===
==== Nominee ====
- Don Beyer, incumbent U.S. representative

==== Eliminated in primary ====
- Lorena Thorne Bruner, entrepreneur
- Michael Duffin, former State Department official
- Adam Dunigan, former operations officer for the Central Intelligence Agency
- Mo Seifeldein, former at-large Alexandria city councillor (2019–2021)

==== Withdrawn ====
- Frank Ferreira, former FEMA whistleblower
- Daniel Gray, program manager
- Jason Knapp, former U.S. Navy fighter pilot and national security official (ran in the 1st district)

==== Endorsements ====
Don Beyer

U.S. senators

- Tim Kaine, Virginia (2013–present)
- Mark Warner, Virginia (2009–present)

Statewide officials

- Abigail Spanberger, governor of Virginia (2026–present)

Labor unions

- American Federation of Government Employees

Organizations

- Center for Freethought Equality
- Council for a Livable World
- J Street PAC
- League of Conservation Voters
- Planned Parenthood Action Fund
- Population Connection
Mo Seifeldein

Organizations

- New American Leaders Action Fund
- Track AIPAC

==== Fundraising ====
Campaign finance reports as of July 15, 2026
| Candidate | Raised | Spent | Cash on hand |
|---|---|---|---|
| Don Beyer (D) | $2,125,761 | $1,843,890 | $838,934 |
| Michael Duffin (D) | $35,839 | $34,670 | $1,169 |
| Adam Dunigan (D) | $253,037 | $229,461 | $23,576 |
| Mo Seifeldein (D) | $159,815 | $142,248 | $17,568 |
Source: Federal Election Commission

==== Debates and forums ====
2026 Virginia's 8th congressional district Democratic primary debate
| No. | Date | Host | Moderator | Link | Democratic | Democratic | Democratic | Democratic | Democratic |
| Key: P Participant A Absent N Not invited I Invited W Withdrawn | | | | | | | | | |
| Key: P Participant A Absent N Not invited I Invited W Withdrawn | | | | | Don Beyer | Lorena Thorne Bruner | Michael Duffin | Adam Dunigan | Mo Seifeldein |
|---|---|---|---|---|---|---|---|---|---|
| 1 | June 28, 2026 | Fairfax County Democratic Committee | Evelyn Spain | YouTube | P | A | P | P | P |

==== Results ====
Democratic primary results
| Party | Candidate | Votes | % |
|---|---|---|---|
| Democratic | Don Beyer (incumbent) | 41,220 | 67.1 |
| Democratic | Mo Seifeldein | 11,062 | 18.0 |
| Democratic | Adam Dunigan | 5,564 | 9.1 |
| Democratic | Michael Duffin | 2,000 | 3.3 |
| Democratic | Lorena Thorne Bruner | 1,619 | 2.6 |
| Total votes | | 61,465 | 100.0 |

=== Republican primary ===
==== Nominee ====
- Tony Sabio, former CIA and Secret Service officer

==== Withdrawn ====
- Heerak Christian Kim, educator and perennial candidate
- Luke Nathan Phillips, tour guide

==== Fundraising ====
Campaign finance reports as of July 15, 2026
| Candidate | Raised | Spent | Cash on hand |
|---|---|---|---|
| Heerak Christian Kim (R) | $3,300 | $2,262 | $1,317 |
| Tony Sabio (R) | $21,917 | $4,014 | $17,903 |
Source: Federal Election Commission

=== Third parties and independents ===
==== Declared ====
- Shelly Arnoldi (Libertarian), activist and independent candidate for HD-16 in 2025
- Tim Sharman (Independent), consultant

=== General election ===
==== Predictions ====
| Source | Ranking | As of |
|---|---|---|
| Decision Desk HQ | Safe D | July 14, 2026 |
| The Cook Political Report | Solid D | April 21, 2026 |
| Inside Elections | Solid D | April 21, 2026 |
| Sabato's Crystal Ball | Safe D | April 21, 2026 |

Don Beyer (D)

Labor unions

- Association of Flight Attendants

Organizations

- A New Policy PAC
- Emgage Action
- Humane World Action Fund
- Virginia National Organization for Women PAC

==== Fundraising ====
Campaign finance reports as of September 30, 2026
| Candidate | Raised | Spent | Cash on hand |
|---|---|---|---|
| Don Beyer (D) | $2,474,100 | $2,192,249 | $838,913 |
| Tony Sabio (R) | $42,099 | $25,098 | $16,577 |
Source: Federal Election Commission

==== Results ====
2026 Virginia's 8th congressional district election
| Party | Candidate | Votes | % | ±% |
|---|---|---|---|---|
| Democratic | Don Beyer (incumbent) | | | |
| Republican | Tony Sabio | | | |
| Libertarian | Shelly Arnoldi | | | |
| Independent | Tim Sharman | | | |
| Write-in | | | | |
| Total votes | | | | |

== District 9 ==
2026 Virginia's 9th congressional district election
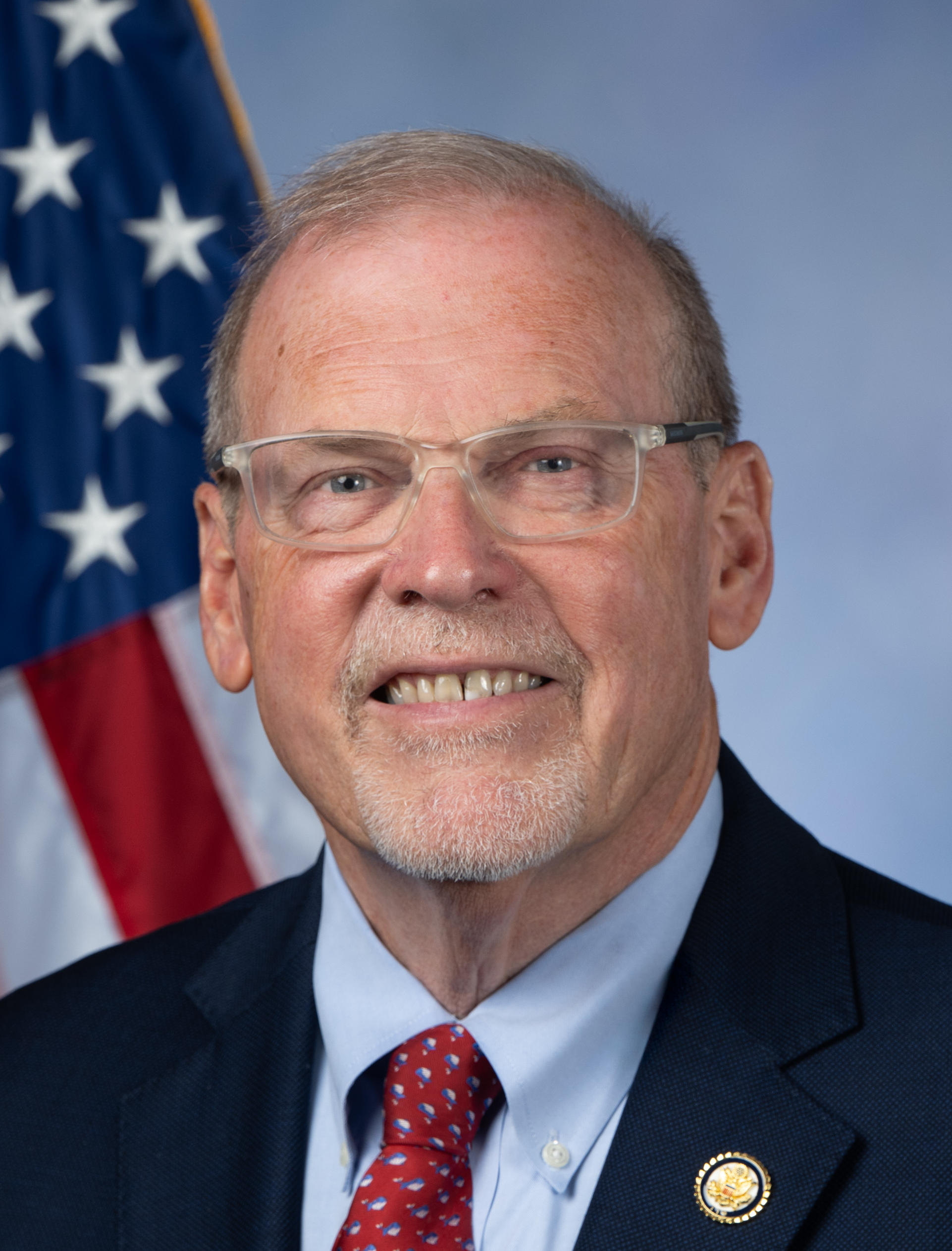

| Nominee | Morgan Griffith | Joy Powers |
| Party | Republican | Democratic |
| Popular vote | 195,306 | 103,089 |
| Percentage | 65.32% | 34.48% |
- County and independent city results Griffith: 50–60% 60–70% 70–80% 80–90% Powers: 50–60% 60–70%
U.S. Representative before election
Morgan Griffith
Republican
Elected U.S. Representative
Morgan Griffith
Republican

The 9th district takes in rural southwest Virginia, including Abingdon, Blacksburg, Bristol and Norton. The incumbent is Republican Morgan Griffith, who was re-elected with 72.5% of the vote in 2024.

=== Election background ===
Congressman Griffith represents a safe Republican seat and is not expected to face a serious challenge from Democrats. Griffith has refused to debate his Democratic challenger Joy Powers.

=== Republican primary ===
==== Nominee ====
- Morgan Griffith, incumbent U.S. representative

==== Withdrawn ====
- Brandon Cook, security guard

==== Endorsements ====
Morgan Griffith

Executive branch officials

- Donald Trump, president of the United States (2017–2021, 2025–present)

Organizations

- AIPAC
- Freedom Caucus Fund

==== Fundraising ====
Campaign finance reports as of July 15, 2026
| Candidate | Raised | Spent | Cash on hand |
|---|---|---|---|
| Morgan Griffith (R) | $1,828,839 | $1,318,861 | $973,867 |
Source: Federal Election Commission

=== Democratic primary ===
==== Nominee ====
- Joy Powers, farmer and nominee for Virginia's 51st House of Delegates district in 2025

==== Eliminated in primary ====
- Doug Crockett, retired United Methodist pastor and attorney
- Adam Murphy, software developer

==== Withdrawn ====
- Brandi Hall

==== Endorsements ====
Adam Murphy

Organizations

- Progressive Victory

==== Fundraising ====
Campaign finance reports as of July 15, 2026
| Candidate | Raised | Spent | Cash on hand |
|---|---|---|---|
| Doug Crockett (D) | $10,736 | $10,932 | $243 |
| Adam Murphy (D) | $58,700 | $55,775 | $2,925 |
| Joy Powers (D) | $85,335 | $71,395 | $13,941 |
Source: Federal Election Commission

==== Debates and forums ====
2026 Virginia's 9th congressional district Democratic primary debate
| No. | Date | Host | Moderator | Link | Democratic | Democratic | Democratic |
| Key: P Participant A Absent N Not invited I Invited W Withdrawn | | | | | | | |
| Key: P Participant A Absent N Not invited I Invited W Withdrawn | | | | | Doug Crockett | Adam Murphy | Joy Powers |
|---|---|---|---|---|---|---|---|
| 1 | June 25, 2026 | Washington County Virginia Democrats | Heather Evans | YouTube | P | P | P |

==== Results ====
Democratic primary results
| Party | Candidate | Votes | % |
|---|---|---|---|
| Democratic | Joy Powers | 9,521 | 51.7 |
| Democratic | Adam Murphy | 6,698 | 36.4 |
| Democratic | Doug Crockett | 2,195 | 11.9 |
| Total votes | | 18,414 | 100.0 |

=== General election ===
==== Predictions ====
| Source | Ranking | As of |
|---|---|---|
| Decision Desk HQ | Safe R | July 14, 2026 |
| The Cook Political Report | Solid R | April 21, 2026 |
| Inside Elections | Solid R | April 21, 2026 |
| Sabato's Crystal Ball | Safe R | April 21, 2026 |

==== Post-primary endorsements ====
Morgan Griffith (R)

Organizations

- National Federation of Independent Business
Joy Powers (D)

Labor unions

- United Auto Workers

Organizations

- National Women's Political Caucus
- Virginia National Organization for Women PAC

==== Fundraising ====
Campaign finance reports as of September 30, 2026
| Candidate | Raised | Spent | Cash on hand |
|---|---|---|---|
| Morgan Griffith (R) | $2,141,842 | $1,514,206 | $1,091,525 |
| Joy Powers (D) | $241,962 | $153,470 | $88,535 |
Source: Federal Election Commission

==== Results ====
2026 Virginia's 9th congressional district election
| Party | Candidate | Votes | % | ±% |
|---|---|---|---|---|
| Republican | Morgan Griffith (incumbent) | | | |
| Democratic | Joy Powers | | | |
| Write-in | | | | |
| Total votes | | | | |

== District 10 ==
2026 Virginia's 10th congressional district election
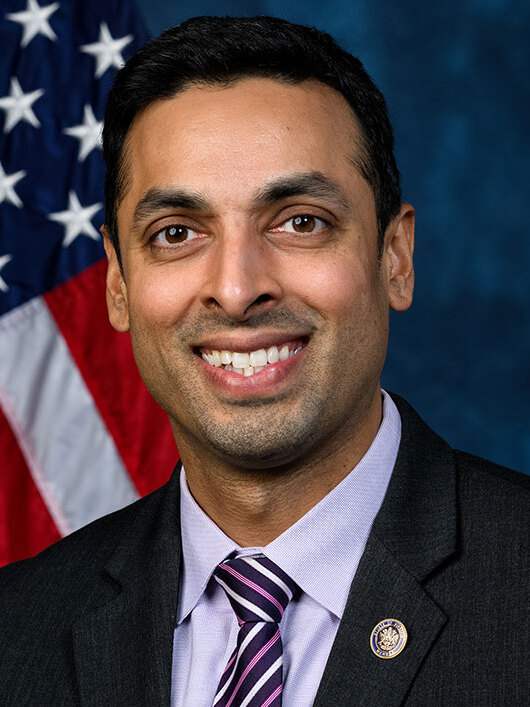

| Nominee | Suhas Subramanyam | Dave Beckwith |
| Party | Democratic | Republican |
| Popular vote | 207,164 | 122,064 |
| Percentage | 61.65% | 36.33% |
- Subramanyam: 50–60% 60–70% 70–80% Beckwith: 50–60%
U.S. Representative before election
Suhas Subramanyam
Democratic
Elected U.S. Representative
Suhas Subramanyam
Democratic

The 10th district is based in the Northern Virginia suburbs and exurbs, encompassing Fauquier, Loudoun, and Rappahannock counties, the independent cities of Manassas and Manassas Park, and portions of Fairfax and Prince William counties. The incumbent is Democrat Suhas Subramanyam, who was elected with 52.1% of the vote in 2024.

=== Election background ===
Congressman Subramanyam has a significant fundraising advantage and is not expected to face a serious challenge from Republicans. Subramanyam met his Republican challenger Dave Beckwith at a debate held at The National Conference Center hosted by the Loudoun Chamber of Commerce on September 22. The organizers had initially invited all three candidates. However, a day earlier, the invitation to independent candidate Ahsen Malik was rescinded. Malik alleges that his invitation was withdrawn because one of the major party nominees threatened to withdraw if he attended.

=== Democratic primary ===
==== Nominee ====
- Suhas Subramanyam, incumbent U.S. representative

==== Endorsements ====
Suhas Subramanyam

U.S. senators

- Tim Kaine, Virginia (2013–present)
- Mark Warner, Virginia (2009–present)

U.S. representatives

- Jennifer Wexton, VA-10 (2019–2025)

Statewide officials

- Abigail Spanberger, governor of Virginia (2026–present)

State legislators

- Wendy Gooditis, former HD-10 (2018–2024)

Labor unions

- American Federation of Government Employees

Organizations

- Jewish Democratic Council of America
- Joint Action Committee for Political Affairs
- Leading the Future
- League of Conservation Voters Action Fund
- National Education Association
- Planned Parenthood Action Fund
- Virginia National Organization for Women PAC

==== Fundraising ====
Campaign finance reports as of July 15, 2026
| Candidate | Raised | Spent | Cash on hand |
|---|---|---|---|
| Suhas Subramanyam (D) | $1,170,446 | $678,467 | $582,812 |
Source: Federal Election Commission

=== Republican primary ===
==== Nominee ====
- Dave Beckwith, U.S. Air Force veteran and candidate for this seat in 2022

==== Eliminated in primary ====
- Julie Perry, teacher and nominee for SD-36 in 2023
- Anthony Suttles

==== Withdrawn ====
- Sam Wong, retired U.S. Army lieutenant colonel (remained on ballot)

==== Fundraising ====
Italics indicate a withdrawn candidate.

Campaign finance reports as of July 15, 2026
| Candidate | Raised | Spent | Cash on hand |
|---|---|---|---|
| David Beckwith (R) | $107,334 | $53,073 | $54,260 |
| Julie Perry (R) | $15,971 | $15,493 | $479 |
| Sam Wong (R) | $223,056 | $220,224 | $2,832 |
Source: Federal Election Commission

==== Debates and forums ====
2026 Virginia's 10th congressional district Republican primary debate
| No. | Date | Host | Moderator | Link | Republican | Republican | Republican |
| Key: P Participant A Absent N Not invited I Invited W Withdrawn | | | | | | | |
| Key: P Participant A Absent N Not invited I Invited W Withdrawn | | | | | Dave Beckwith | Julie Perry | Anthony Suttles |
|---|---|---|---|---|---|---|---|
| 1 | June 24, 2026 | Loudoun County Republican Committee | John Fredericks | YouTube | P | P | A |

==== Results ====
Republican primary results
| Party | Candidate | Votes | % |
|---|---|---|---|
| Republican | Dave Beckwith | 13,388 | 72.6 |
| Republican | Julie Perry | 3,758 | 20.4 |
| Republican | Anthony Suttles | 1,010 | 5.5 |
| Republican | Sam Wong (withdrawn) | 297 | 1.6 |
| Total votes | | 18,453 | 100.0 |

=== Independents ===
==== Declared ====
- Ahsen Malik, educator

=== General election ===
==== Predictions ====
| Source | Ranking | As of |
|---|---|---|
| Decision Desk HQ | Safe D | July 14, 2026 |
| The Cook Political Report | Solid D | April 21, 2026 |
| Inside Elections | Solid D | April 21, 2026 |
| Sabato's Crystal Ball | Safe D | April 21, 2026 |

==== Post-primary endorsements ====
Suhas Subramanyam (D)

Organizations

- Humane World Action Fund

==== Fundraising ====
Campaign finance reports as of September 30, 2026
| Candidate | Raised | Spent | Cash on hand |
|---|---|---|---|
| Suhas Subramanyam (D) | $1,570,431 | $1,014,298 | $646,966 |
| Dave Beckwith (R) | $230,995 | $182,657 | $56,374 |
Source: Federal Election Commission

==== Debates ====
2026 Virginia's 10th congressional district debate
| No. | Date | Host | Moderator | Link | Democratic | Republican | Independent |
| Key: P Participant A Absent N Not invited I Invited W Withdrawn | | | | | | | |
| Key: P Participant A Absent N Not invited I Invited W Withdrawn | | | | | Subramanyam | Beckwith | Malik |
|---|---|---|---|---|---|---|---|
| 1 | September 22, 2026 | Loudoun Chamber of Commerce; The National Conference Center | Tony Howard | Facebook | P | P | N |

==== Results ====
2026 Virginia's 10th congressional district election
| Party | Candidate | Votes | % | ±% |
|---|---|---|---|---|
| Democratic | Suhas Subramanyam (incumbent) | | | |
| Republican | Dave Beckwith | | | |
| Independent | Ahsen Malik | | | |
| Write-in | | | | |
| Total votes | | | | |

== District 11 ==
2026 Virginia's 11th congressional district election
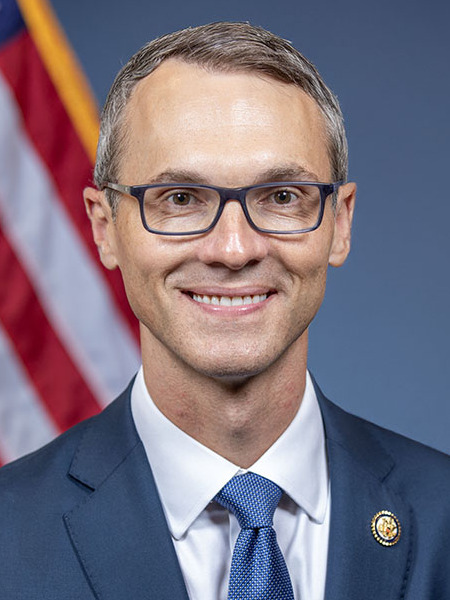

| Nominee | James Walkinshaw | Arthur Purves |
| Party | Democratic | Republican |
| Popular vote | 252,443 | 82,248 |
| Percentage | 74.25% | 24.19% |
- Walkinshaw: 70–80%
U.S. Representative before election
James Walkinshaw
Democratic
Elected U.S. Representative
James Walkinshaw
Democratic

The 11th district encompasses portions of suburban Northern Virginia, including the city of Fairfax and portions of Fairfax County. The incumbent is Democrat James Walkinshaw, who was elected with 75.1% of the vote in a special election to finish the term of representative Gerry Connolly, who died in office on May 21, 2025. Connolly had previously announced he would not run for re-election in April, citing health concerns.

=== Election background ===
Congressman Walkinshaw represents a safe Democratic seat and is not expected to face a serious challenge from Republicans or third parties.

=== Democratic primary ===
==== Nominee ====
- James Walkinshaw, incumbent U.S. representative

==== Withdrawn ====
- Bree Fram, retired U.S. Space Force colonel
- Amy Roma, lawyer

==== Endorsements ====
James Walkinshaw

U.S. senators

- Tim Kaine, Virginia (2013–present)
- Mark Warner, Virginia (2009–present)

U.S. representatives

- Jennifer Wexton, VA-10 (2019–2025)

Statewide officials

- Ghazala Hashmi, lieutenant governor of Virginia (2026–present)
- Abigail Spanberger, governor of Virginia (2026–present)

State legislators

- 3 state senators (Note: Jennifer Boysko, SD-38 (2024–present); Jeremy McPike, SD-30 (2016–present); Russet Perry, SD-31 (2024–present))
- 5 state delegates (Note: Elizabeth Guzman, HD-22 (2026–present); Michelle Maldonado, HD-20 (2022–present); John McAuliff, HD-30 (2026–present); Briana Sewell, HD-25 (2022–present); Josh Thomas, HD-21 (2024–present))

Labor unions

- American Federation of Government Employees

Organizations

- Fairshake
- J Street PAC
- Planned Parenthood Action Fund
Bree Fram (withdrawn)

Executive branch officials

- Frank Kendall III, former secretary of the Air Force (2021–2025)

Organizations

- Advocates for Trans Equality

==== Fundraising ====
Italics indicate a withdrawn candidate.

Campaign finance reports as of July 15, 2026
| Candidate | Raised | Spent | Cash on hand |
|---|---|---|---|
| Amy Roma (D) | $1,285,227 | $1,285,227 | $0 |
| Bree Fram (D) | $289,058 | $287,679 | $1,379 |
| James Walkinshaw (D) | $2,758,961 | $1,779,785 | $979,176 |
Source: Federal Election Commission

=== Republican primary ===
==== Nominee ====
- Arthur Purves, president of the Fairfax County taxpayers alliance and perennial candidate

==== Withdrawn ====
- Gavin Solomon, businessman

==== Fundraising ====
Italics indicate a withdrawn candidate.

Campaign finance reports as of June 30, 2026
| Candidate | Raised | Spent | Cash on hand |
|---|---|---|---|
| Arthur Purves (R) | $5,637 | $5,437 | $200 |
Source: Federal Election Commission

=== Green Party ===
==== Nominee ====
- Dianne Blais, activist

=== General election ===
==== Predictions ====
| Source | Ranking | As of |
|---|---|---|
| Decision Desk HQ | Safe D | July 14, 2026 |
| The Cook Political Report | Solid D | April 21, 2026 |
| Inside Elections | Solid D | April 21, 2026 |
| Sabato's Crystal Ball | Safe D | April 21, 2026 |

==== Post-primary endorsements ====
James Walkinshaw (D)

Organizations

- Association of Flight Attendants
- Humane World Action Fund
- Virginia National Organization for Women PAC

==== Fundraising ====
Campaign finance reports as of September 30, 2026
| Candidate | Raised | Spent | Cash on hand |
|---|---|---|---|
| James Walkinshaw (D) | $3,187,857 | $2,081,565 | $1,106,292 |
| Arthur Purves (R) | $30,845 | $13,826 | $17,018 |
Source: Federal Election Commission

==== Results ====
2026 Virginia's 11th congressional district election
| Party | Candidate | Votes | % | ±% |
|---|---|---|---|---|
| Democratic | James Walkinshaw (incumbent) | | | |
| Republican | Arthur Purves | | | |
| Green | Dianne Blais | | | |
| Write-in | | | | |
| Total votes | | | | |

== Notes ==
Partisan clients
