= Paralyzed Veterans Golf Open =

The Paralyzed Veterans Golf Open is an annual charity golf tournament. Proceeds from the tournament support PAVE (Paving Access for Veterans Employment), Paralyzed Veterans of America's vocational rehabilitation program. The mission of the program is to pave a path for employment, economic self-sufficiency and vocational fulfillment for any veteran seeking better quality of life.

The 10th PVGO event was held on June 19, 2017, in Lansdowne, Virginia.
