= J.P. Cooney =

American former prosecutor

- Born: Joseph Cooney
- Education: University of Virginia (JD)
- Political party: Democratic

Joseph Cooney is an American lawyer and former federal prosecutor. Cooney was chief of the Fraud and Public Corruption Section at the United States Attorney's Office for the District of Columbia, where he worked on the prosecutions of Roger Stone and Steve Bannon. In November 2022, Jack Smith named him his deputy in the special counsel investigation of Donald Trump. Trump dismissed Cooney from the Justice Department in January 2025.

== Early life and education ==
Joseph Cooney attended the University of Virginia School of Law in the 2000s.

== Career ==
=== United States Department of Justice ===
Cooney delivered the closing words in the initial bribery trial of New Jersey senator Bob Menendez in November 2017. By November 2018, Cooney had been promoted as the chief of the Fraud and Public Corruption Section in the United States Attorney's Office for the District of Columbia. He oversaw the investigation into Andrew McCabe, the former deputy director of the Federal Bureau of Investigation, and sought for prosecutors to indict McCabe despite public comments from President Donald Trump that prosecutors believed had possibly jeopardized the case. Cooney was additionally involved in the sentencing of the political operative Roger Stone and had conflicted with the leadership of the Department of Justice over the length of Stone's sentence. Cooney was concurrently the lead prosecutor in the contempt of Congress case against the political strategist Steve Bannon.

In November 2022, Jack Smith named Cooney as his deputy in his special counsel investigation. Cooney was fired by Trump in January 2025 for his association with Smith. That year, he appeared before the House Committee on the Judiciary in its inquiry into Smith's investigation.

=== Congressional campaign ===
On February 11, 2026, Cooney announced that he would run in the 2026 United States House of Representatives election for Virginia's seventh congressional district. According to Cooney, he was motivated to run after the killing of Alex Pretti and what he described as the "despicable lies" surrounding Pretti told by government officials.

== Works cited ==
- Leonnig, Carol; Davis, Aaron C. (2025). Injustice: How Politics and Fear Vanquished America's Justice Department. Penguin Press. ISBN 978-0-593-83137-3.
