= The National Conference Center =

Corporate training facility in Lansdowne, Virginia

National Conference Center
- The National
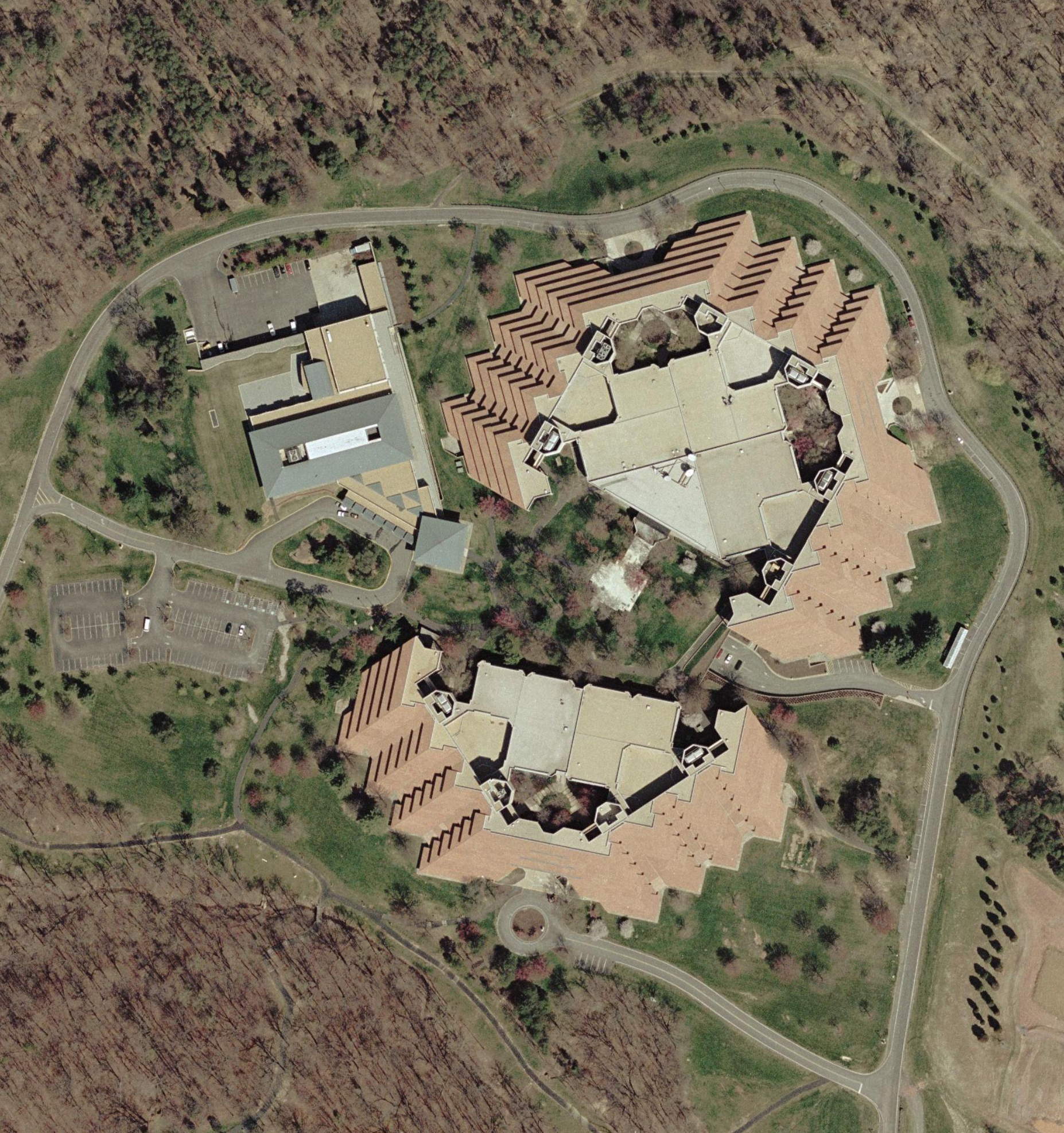
- The National's logo and aerial view
- Interactive map of National Conference Center
- Former names: Xerox International Center for Training and Management Development (XICTMD); Xerox Document University
- Location: Lansdowne, Virginia (Leesburg mailing address)
- Coordinates: 39.09357°N 77.48428°W
- Owner: NCC PS Enterprises, LLC
- Type: Conference Center

Construction
- Built: 1973
- Opened: 1974
- Renovated: 2002
- Expanded: 2007
- Cost: $55 million (1974 dollars); $359 million (2025 dollars)

Website
- http://www.conferencecenter.com

The National Conference Center (The National) is a corporate training facility in Lansdowne, Virginia. It hosts over 14,000 individuals per month and comprises 265,000 square feet (24,600 m^{2}) of meeting space. The center contains 250 conference rooms, an athletic facility, and 917 guest rooms.

The building was built in 1974 as the Xerox Conference Center at a cost of $55 million. It was designed to assist in copier and technology training for company employees. It was designed by Vincent G. Kling & Partners, and is currently managed by NCC EE, LLC. In 1994 Xerox permitted outside organizations to use the grounds. The center was sold to Oxford Capital Partners in 2000. Two years later, the center completed a $29 million renovation, in order to ameliorate its training operations. The current design implements "living learning modules", a series of color-coded buildings, tunnels, a ballroom, and walking trails.

== History ==
The center was built by Xerox in 1974 under the name of Xerox International Center for Training and Management Development. It was later changed to Xerox Document University when an additional building was added to train employees in copier technology and equipment. In 1994 Xerox opened the facilities to other corporations, and sold it to Oxford Capital Partners in 2000 as part of an exit from the hospitality industry. In part this exit was due to a continuous under-capacity in event bookings, despite such events as the National Veterans Golden Age Games being hosted at the site. From its opening in 1974 until May 2014, it was run by ARAMARK Harrison Lodging, a management services company. In May 2014, NCC EE, LLC became the new management services group.

== Renovation ==
Following a $29 million renovation, it was reopened in 2002 to service a wide range of corporate training needs. The center is composed of several buildings which are color-coded (blue, purple, red, orange, and yellow) into "living-learning modules". A network of tunnels connect the main buildings and attached West Belmont Ballroom, constructed in 2007.

== Facilities ==
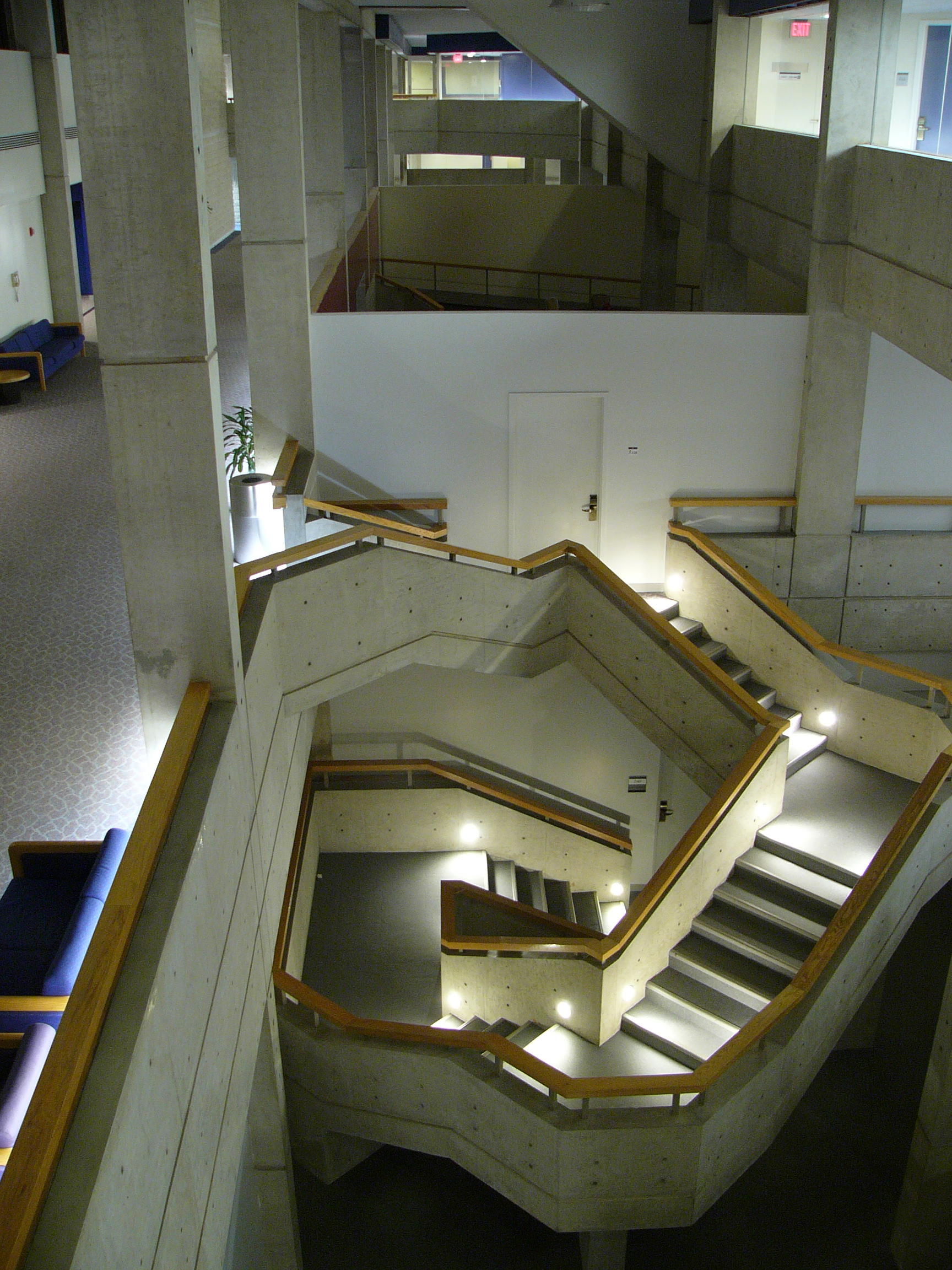
Interior view of walkways at the National Conference Center.

The center was originally situated on 2,265 acres (9.17 km^{2}) of land in Lansdowne, Virginia. Through subsequent sales and subdivisions, the current complex sits on 66.8 acres (0.270 km^{2}) of the original land. Among its 265,000 square feet (24,600 m^{2}) of meeting space are the 16,500 square feet (1,530 m^{2}) ballroom, an 5,000 square feet (460 m^{2}) athletic facility and 250 conference rooms. The remainder of the nearly 1,200,000 square feet (110,000 m^{2}) of the facility include 917 guest rooms (up from 863 rooms in the original facility) and common areas. These facilities were converted from Xerox's dormitory style accommodations, which included shared bathrooms. The center retained the confusing navigational layout of the Xerox era, which was allegedly intended to encourage team building among participants. The rooms in the lodging area were numbered by floor, building, room (ie. 6.1.201 is 6th floor, 1st building, room 101) to match the telephone switching system for future expansion. The distinctive brutalist architecture was also retained, despite extensive renovations.
