= Jennifer Pribble =

Jenny Pribble is a Professor of Political Science and International Studies at the University of Richmond.

== Early life and education ==
Pribble received her B.A. in International Studies from Miami University in 2000, her M.A. in Political Science from University of North Carolina at Chapel Hill in 2004, and her Ph.D. in Political Science from the University of North Carolina at Chapel Hill in 2008.

== Awards and recognition ==
- Virginia Humanities fellowship, 2020
- Princeton University research grant, 2019
- Gerald R. Ford archives research grant, 2019
- Robert and Elizabeth Dole Archive and Special Collections Research Fellowship, 2018
- The Lyndon Baines Johnson Foundation Moody Grant for research at the Johnson archives in Austin, Texas, 2005 and 2015
- Harry S. Truman Library Institute Research Grant for research at the Truman archives in Independence, Missouri, 2005
- University of Richmond, Arts & Sciences Faculty Research Grant, 2015, 2017, 2019
- United States’ State Department Visiting Speaker and Specialist Grant, August 2008.
- Graduate Fellow of the American Academy of Political and Social Science, 2008.
- The University of North Carolina at Chapel Hill Dissertation Completion Fellowship, 2007–2008.
- Organization of American States (OAS) Research Fellowship, 2006–2007.
- Ford Foundation and the University of North Carolina at Chapel Hill, Dissertation Research Fellowship, 2006–2007.
- The University of Richmond International Education Award (2014).
- Linda Dykstra Distinguished Dissertation Award for the Best Dissertation in the Social Sciences, the University of North Carolina at Chapel Hill (2009).
- Honorable Mention, Best Dissertation Fieldwork, American Political Science Association, Comparative Democratization Section (2008).

== Selected publications ==
Books

Welfare and Party Politics in Latin America, Cambridge University Press, 2013

Articles

Pribble, Jennifer. "Chile's Elites Face Demands for Reform." Current History 116, no. 787 (2017): 49–54.

Pribble, Jennifer. 2011. “Worlds Apart: Social Policy Regimes in Latin America,” Studies in Comparative International Development. Vol. 46 (2): 191–216.

Pribble, Jennifer. 2009. “Politics, Policies, and Poverty in Latin America.” (Lead author with: Evelyne Huber and John Stephens). Comparative Politics. Vol. 41 (4): 387–407.

Huber, Evelyne, François Nielsen, Jenny Pribble, and John D. Stephens. 2006. “Political Determinants of Inequality in Latin America and the Caribbean.” American Sociological Review. Vol. 71 (6): 943–963

Pribble, Jennifer. 2006. “The Politics of Women’s Welfare in Chile and Uruguay.” Latin American Research Review. Volume 41 (2): 84–111.

Chapters

Pribble, Jennifer, and Evelyn Huber. "Social Policy and Redistribution: Chile and Uruguay." In The Resurgence of the Latin American Left, edited by Steven Levitsky and Kenneth M. Roberts, 117–38. Baltimore: Johns Hopkins University Press, 2013.
