= Lansdowne, Virginia =

- Census-designated place
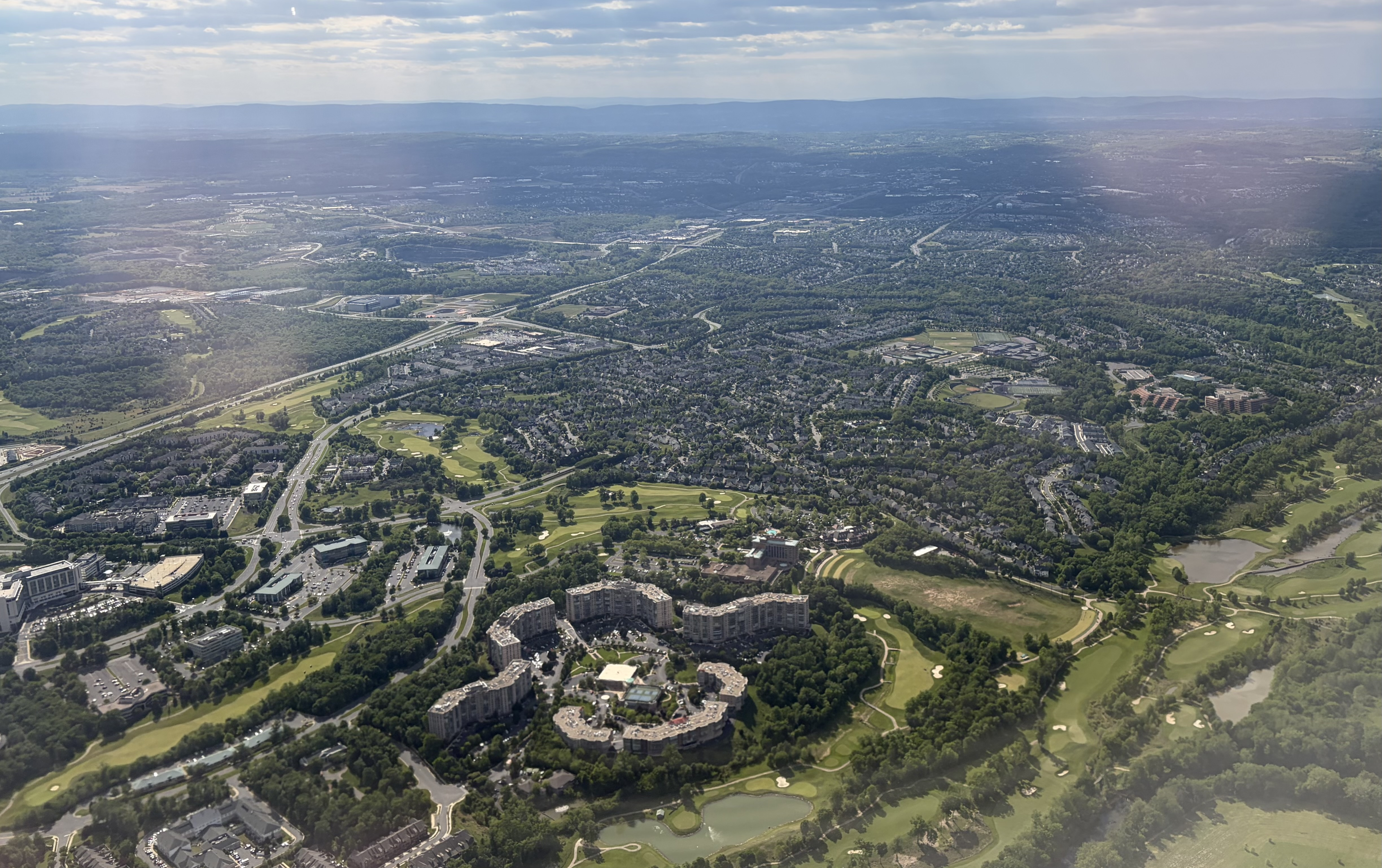
- An aerial photo of Lansdowne from the east

- Location within Northern Virginia Location within Virginia Location within the United States
- Coordinates: 39°4′56″N 77°28′56″W
- Country: United States
- State: Virginia
- County: Loudoun

Area
  - Total: 4.12 sq mi (10.68 km^{2})
  - Land: 4.04 sq mi (10.47 km^{2})
  - Water: 0.081 sq mi (0.21 km^{2})
- Elevation: 340 ft (100 m)

Population (2020)
  - Total: 12,427
- Time zone: UTC−5 (Eastern (EST))
  - Summer (DST): UTC−4 (EDT)
- ZIP code: 20176
- FIPS code: 51-44048
- GNIS feature ID: 2584864

Lansdowne is a census-designated place and planned community located near Leesburg in Loudoun County, Virginia, United States. As of the 2020 census, Lansdowne had a population of 12,427.

It is north of State Route 7 and south of the Potomac River. Before the Revolutionary War, the Lee family established Coton Manor here. A section of the Potomac Heritage Trail runs through Lansdowne. It is the home of Inova Loudoun Hospital, the Jack Kent Cooke Foundation, Lansdowne Resort, Prison Fellowship, and Lansdowne Woods of Virginia, a gated, age-restricted community.

Lansdowne is part of the Washington metropolitan area.

== Geography ==
Lansdowne is in eastern Loudoun County, 32 miles (51 km) northwest of downtown Washington, D.C., and 5 miles (8 km) southeast of Leesburg, the Loudoun county seat. It is bordered to the south, across Route 7, by Belmont and Ashburn, while to the northeast, across the Potomac River, it is bordered by Montgomery County, Maryland.

According to the U.S. Census Bureau, the Lansdowne CDP has a total area of 4.1 square miles (10.7 km^{2}), of which 0.1 square miles (0.2 km^{2}), or 1.98%, are water. Goose Creek flows northward through the northwestern part of the CDP, entering the Potomac River at the northern edge of the community, between the River Creek golf course community to the north and Elizabeth Mills Riverfront Park to the south.

== Demographics ==
Historical population
Census	Pop.	Note	%±
2010	11,253		—
2020	12,427		10.4%
U.S. Decennial Census; 2010 2020

=== 2020 census ===
As of the 2020 census, Lansdowne had a population of 12,427. The median age was 43.2 years. 24.9% of residents were under the age of 18 and 18.4% of residents were 65 years of age or older. For every 100 females there were 90.9 males, and for every 100 females age 18 and over there were 86.9 males age 18 and over.

100.0% of residents lived in urban areas, while 0.0% lived in rural areas.

There were 4,709 households in Lansdowne, of which 36.5% had children under the age of 18 living in them. Of all households, 57.0% were married-couple households, 12.5% were households with a male householder and no spouse or partner present, and 26.5% were households with a female householder and no spouse or partner present. About 27.1% of all households were made up of individuals and 14.1% had someone living alone who was 65 years of age or older.

There were 4,892 housing units, of which 3.7% were vacant. The homeowner vacancy rate was 0.8% and the rental vacancy rate was 5.7%.

Racial composition as of the 2020 census
Race	Number	Percent
White	7,828	63.0%
Black or African American	977	7.9%
American Indian and Alaska Native	29	0.2%
Asian	2,147	17.3%
Native Hawaiian and Other Pacific Islander	7	0.1%
Some other race	275	2.2%
Two or more races	1,164	9.4%
Hispanic or Latino (of any race)	902	7.3%

=== 2010 census ===
Lansdowne was first listed as a census designated place in the 2010 U.S. census.

== Homeowners' associations ==
There are three principal residential homeowners' associations in Lansdowne. The largest is the Lansdowne on the Potomac HOA, which represents over 2,200 homes in the Lansdowne area, adjoining the Potomac Station community to the west along Riverside Parkway. The second is Lansdowne Woods of Virginia, a HOA consisting of five condominium associations totaling 1,057 homes. The third is Lansdowne Village Greens (The Homes Lansdowne Town Center), which represents over 500 homes surrounding the Lansdowne Town Center area between Riverside Parkway on the north, Route 7 on the south, Belmont Ridge Road on the west and the Lansdowne Country Club Golf Course on the east.

== Education ==
Students in Lansdowne are served by Loudoun County Public Schools. Children who live in Lansdowne attend elementary school at Seldens Landing Elementary School in Lansdowne. Middle school students attend Belmont Ridge Middle School in Lansdowne. High school students attend Riverside High School, also located in Lansdowne. In the past, students have attended Tuscarora High School (2010–2015), Stone Bridge High School (2002–2010), Eagle Ridge Middle School (2002–2003), Belmont Station Elementary School (2008–2013), and Steuart Weller Elementary School (2013-2026).

== See also ==
- The National Conference Center, located in Lansdowne
