= Protect Economic and Academic Freedom Act =

Proposed law in the United States

Protect Economic and Academic Freedom Act of 2026
- Long title: To amend the Higher Education Act of 1965 to prohibit an institution that participates in a nonexpressive commercial boycott of Israel from being eligible for certain funds under that Act, to require an institution that participates in certain programs under that Act to certify that students are not unreasonably obstructed from participating in academic programs in Israel, and for other purposes.

Codification
- Acts amended: Higher Education Act of 1965

Legislative history
- Introduced in the House of Representatives by Virginia Foxx (R-NC) and Josh Gottheimer (D-NJ) on July 29, 2025; Committee consideration by United States House Committee on Education and Workforce; Passed the House on September 3, 2026 (237–169)

The Protect Economic and Academic Freedom Act of 2026 is a proposed 2026 Act of Congress and anti-BDS law that penalizes American colleges and universities engaged in boycotts of Israel or attempting to prevent students from taking part in exchange programs with Israel. The bill also applies to boycotts of institutions in Israeli settlements in the West Bank and East Jerusalem, which are considered illegal under international law.

== Provisions ==
The bill would require federally funded universities to certify that they "will not engage in a nonexpressive commercial boycott of a major strategic partner of the United States." It defines "major strategic partner" from Section 4 of Public Law 113–296, which states: "It is the sense of Congress that Israel is a major strategic partner of the United States."

The bill would prohibit universities from withdrawing from "conferences, teaching exchanges, cultural exchanges, study abroad programs, joint research, and other collaborative educational activities" with US partners.

The legislation's text does not explicitly mention the Boycott, Divestment, and Sanctions (BDS) movement, but bill co-sponsors Virginia Foxx and Josh Gottheimer directly mention the movement in their respective statements following passage of the bill by the House of Representatives on September 3, 2026.

== Legislative history ==
=== House of Representatives ===
The bill was introduced in the House of Representatives by representatives Virginia Foxx and Josh Gottheimer on July 29, 2025.

House Democratic leaders, including minority leader Hakeem Jeffries, opposed the bill, saying, "Our Jewish brothers and sisters deserve safety and security on campuses across the nation, and I continue to oppose the Boycott, Divestment and Sanctions movement. Unfortunately, H.R. 4795 is a poorly written Republican bill that does not achieve that goal."

On September 3, 2026, the bill was passed by the House of Representatives 237 to 169, with 33 Democrats breaking with their party to vote in favor of the bill. Representatives Thomas Massie and Warren Davidson were the only Republicans to vote against the bill.

In a statement after the House passage of the bill, Gottheimer wrote, "My bipartisan bill with Congresswoman Foxx is narrow and targeted — it doesn’t touch anyone’s speech, protest, or academic debate. It simply says that if your university takes federal taxpayer dollars, it can’t discriminate against academic partnerships or investments with one country. That’s it. I urge my colleagues on both sides of the aisle to support this bipartisan bill."

Foxx wrote, "The antisemitic rot that has corroded college campuses must be eradicated – enough is enough. The safety and security of Jewish students, faculty, and staff should never be threatened under any circumstances. Today, the House sent a clear message: if an institution of higher education chooses to capitulate to the caustic BDS movement, there will be consequences – starting with this bipartisan legislation."

== Reaction ==
=== Support ===
The bill was supported by the American Israel Public Affairs Committee (AIPAC). Following the passage of the bill by the House on September 3, 2026, AIPAC wrote on X "Thank you @RepJoshG and @virginiafoxx for leading this important bipartisan effort to counter the dangerous BDS [or Boycott, Divestment, and Sanctions] campaign and safeguard academic engagement with Israel."

Following the House vote, the Anti-Defamation League welcomed passage of the bill, criticizing BDS as a means "to delegitimize Israel and demonize Jews and other students for their connection to the Jewish state." The Combat Antisemitism Movement also issued a statement of support, writing in a letter to all members of the House that "Academic boycotts of Israel harm American students and scholars, weaken vital U.S.-Israel research collaboration, and lend the credibility of American universities to a discriminatory campaign that singles out the only Jewish state."

=== Opposition ===
American-Arab Anti-Discrimination Committee (ADC) president Jenin Younes criticized the bill, citing First Amendment concerns. In a statement to Al Jazeera, Younes said, "The Supreme Court has made clear that the government cannot condition its funding on suppression of First Amendment-protected activity," adding "Courts also recognise that boycotts constitute such activity."

The Council on American-Islamic Relations (CAIR) released a statement describing the bill as "a blatant attempt to hold American students’ financial futures hostage in order to shield the Israeli government and entities operating under Israeli law from peaceful economic pressure."

In advance of the House vote, Lara Friedman, the President of the Foundation for Middle East Peace, said of the bill, "The goal here is to basically say every university not only cannot refuse cooperation with Israel but must actively seek every opportunity to cooperate with Israel," adding "And if they're not doing that, they're pro-BDS and anti-Israel." Friedman also wrote the bill would create cause for lawsuits under the False Claims Act against universities accused of boycotting American allies, as it would force universities to "prove a negative" in order to avoid lawsuits, suggesting the bill will force them into "prioritizing maximal engagement" with these countries.

== See also ==
- Anti-BDS laws
- Palestine exception
