= Navy, Virginia =

Coordinates: 38°53′23″N 77°22′41″W

Navy CDP, Virginia
- Unincorporated community Census-designated place
- Location within the state of Virginia Navy CDP, Virginia (the United States)
- Country: United States of America
- State: Virginia
- County: Fairfax

Area
  - Total: 1.37 sq mi (3.55 km^{2})
  - Land: 1.36 sq mi (3.51 km^{2})
  - Water: 0.015 sq mi (0.04 km^{2})
- Time zone: UTC-5 (Eastern (EST))
  - Summer (DST): UTC-4 (EDT)

Navy is an unincorporated community and census designated place in Fairfax County, Virginia, United States.

It first appeared as a CDP in the 2020 Census with a population of 4,327.

== Demographics ==
Historical population
Census	Pop.	Note	%±
2020	4,327		—
U.S. Decennial Census; 2020

Navy first appeared as a census designated place in the 2020 U.S. census.

=== 2020 census ===
As of the 2020 census, Navy had a population of 4,327. The median age was 42.0 years. 25.9% of residents were under the age of 18 and 10.7% were 65 years of age or older. For every 100 females, there were 99.2 males, and for every 100 females age 18 and over, there were 96.5 males age 18 and over.

100.0% of residents lived in urban areas, while 0.0% lived in rural areas.

There were 1,315 households, of which 49.6% had children under the age of 18 living in them. Of all households, 82.5% were married-couple households, 6.0% were households with a male householder and no spouse or partner present, and 10.0% were households with a female householder and no spouse or partner present. About 6.6% of all households were made up of individuals, and 2.2% had someone living alone who was 65 years of age or older.

There were 1,324 housing units, of which 0.7% were vacant. The homeowner vacancy rate was 0.5% and the rental vacancy rate was 0.0%.

Navy CDP, Virginia – Racial and ethnic composition Note: the US Census treats Hispanic/Latino as an ethnic category. This table excludes Latinos from the racial categories and assigns them to a separate category. Hispanics/Latinos may be of any race.
Race / Ethnicity (NH = Non-Hispanic)	Pop 2020	% 2020
White alone (NH)	1,560	36.05%
Black or African American alone (NH)	238	5.50%
Native American or Alaska Native alone (NH)	3	0.07%
Asian alone (NH)	2,169	50.13%
Native Hawaiian or Pacific Islander alone (NH)	0	0.00%
Other race alone (NH)	16	0.37%
Mixed race or Multiracial (NH)	185	4.28%
Hispanic or Latino (any race)	156	3.61%
Total	4,327	100.00%
