= Union Mill, Virginia =

Union Mill
- Census-designated place
- Location within the state of Virginia Union Mill (the United States)
- Coordinates: 38.798°N 77.381°W
- Country: United States of America
- State: Virginia
- County: Fairfax

Area
  - Total: 10.08 sq mi (26.11 km^{2})
  - Land: 9.98 sq mi (25.86 km^{2})
  - Water: 0.097 sq mi (0.25 km^{2})
- Time zone: UTC-5 (Eastern (EST))
  - Summer (DST): UTC-4 (EDT)

Union Mill is a census designated place in Fairfax County, Virginia, United States.

As of the 2020 census, Union Mill had a population of 4,997.

== Demographics ==
Union Mill first appeared as a census designated place in the 2020 U.S. census.

=== 2020 census ===
Union Mill CDP, Virginia – Racial and ethnic composition Note: the US Census treats Hispanic/Latino as an ethnic category. This table excludes Latinos from the racial categories and assigns them to a separate category. Hispanics/Latinos may be of any race.
| Race / Ethnicity (NH = Non-Hispanic) | Pop 2020 | 2020 |
|---|---|---|
| White alone (NH) | 3,285 | 65.74% |
| Black or African American alone (NH) | 140 | 2.80% |
| Native American or Alaska Native alone (NH) | 6 | 0.12% |
| Asian alone (NH) | 984 | 19.69% |
| Native Hawaiian or Pacific Islander alone (NH) | 2 | 0.04% |
| Other race alone (NH) | 30 | 0.60% |
| Mixed race or Multiracial (NH) | 243 | 4.86% |
| Hispanic or Latino (any race) | 307 | 6.14% |
| Total | 4,997 | 100.00% |
