= Sully Square, Virginia =

Sully Square
- Census-designated place
- Location within the state of Virginia Sully Square (the United States)
- Coordinates: 38.918°N 77.425°W
- Country: United States of America
- State: Virginia
- County: Fairfax

Area
  - Total: 0.80 sq mi (2.07 km^{2})
  - Land: 0.79 sq mi (2.05 km^{2})
  - Water: 0.0077 sq mi (0.02 km^{2})
- Time zone: UTC-5 (Eastern (EST))
  - Summer (DST): UTC-4 (EDT)

Sully Square is a census designated place in Fairfax County, Virginia, United States. As of the 2020 census, Sully Square had a population of 2,300.

== Demographics ==
Sully Square first appeared as a census designated place in the 2020 U.S. census.

Sully Square CDP, Virginia – Racial and ethnic composition Note: the US Census treats Hispanic/Latino as an ethnic category. This table excludes Latinos from the racial categories and assigns them to a separate category. Hispanics/Latinos may be of any race.
Race / Ethnicity (NH = Non-Hispanic)	Pop 2020	2020
White alone (NH)	522	22.70%
Black or African American alone (NH)	173	7.52%
Native American or Alaska Native alone (NH)	5	0.22%
Asian alone (NH)	1,405	61.09%
Native Hawaiian or Pacific Islander alone (NH)	0	0.00%
Other race alone (NH)	14	0.61%
Mixed race or Multiracial (NH)	96	4.17%
Hispanic or Latino (any race)	85	3.70%
Total	2,300	100.00%
