= Bull Run, Fairfax County, Virginia =

Bull Run
- Census-designated place
- Location within the state of Virginia Bull Run (the United States)
- Coordinates: 38.84°N 77.49°W
- Country: United States of America
- State: Virginia
- County: Fairfax

Area
  - Land: 14.42 sq mi (37.35 km^{2})

Population (2020)
  - Total: 6,972
  - Density: 484/sq mi (186.7/km^{2})
- Time zone: UTC-5 (Eastern (EST))
  - Summer (DST): UTC-4 (EDT)

Bull Run is a census designated place in Fairfax County, Virginia, United States. It has an area of 14.42 square miles.

== Geography ==
Bull Run was first listed as a CDP in the 2020 census with a population of 6,972.

== Demographics ==
Bull Run first appeared as a census designated place in the 2020 U.S. census.

Bull Run CDP, Virginia – Racial and ethnic composition Note: the US Census treats Hispanic/Latino as an ethnic category. This table excludes Latinos from the racial categories and assigns them to a separate category. Hispanics/Latinos may be of any race.
Race / Ethnicity (NH = Non-Hispanic)	Pop 2020	2020
White alone (NH)	4,418	63.37%
Black or African American alone (NH)	286	4.10%
Native American or Alaska Native alone (NH)	3	0.04%
Asian alone (NH)	1,336	19.16%
Native Hawaiian or Pacific Islander alone (NH)	3	0.04%
Other race alone (NH)	58	0.83%
Mixed race or Multiracial (NH)	398	5.71%
Hispanic or Latino (any race)	470	6.74%
Total	6,972	100.00%

At the 2020 census (some information from the 2022 American Community Survey) there were 6,972 people, 2,213 housing units and 2,133 households residing in the CDP. The population density was 483.5 inhabitants per square mile (186.7 inhabitants/km^{2}). The average housing unit density was 153.5 per square mile (59.3/km^{2}). The racial makeup of the CDP was 64.99% White, 4.20% African American, 0.09% Native American, 19.29% Asian, 0.04% Pacific Islander, 2.40% from other races, and 8.99% from two or more races. Hispanic or Latino of any race was 6.74% of the population.

Of the households, 84.4% were married couple families, 5.9% were a male family householder with no spouse, and 5.8% were a female family householder with no spouse. The average family household had 3.62 people.

The median age was 39.6, 25.8% of people were under the age of 18, and 11.6% were 65 years of age or older. The largest ancestry is the 17.5% who had Irish ancestry, 21.0% spoke a language other than English at home, and 17.6% were born outside the United States, 73.6% of whom were naturalized citizens.

The median income for a household in the CDP was $240,750. 10.7% of the population were military veterans, and 75.1% had a batchelor's degree or higher. In the CDP 4.8% of the population was below the poverty line, including 4.6% of those under age 18 and 0.0% of those age 65 or over, with 2.1% of the population without health insurance.
