= Fairfax County, Virginia =

County in Virginia, United States

Fairfax County
- County
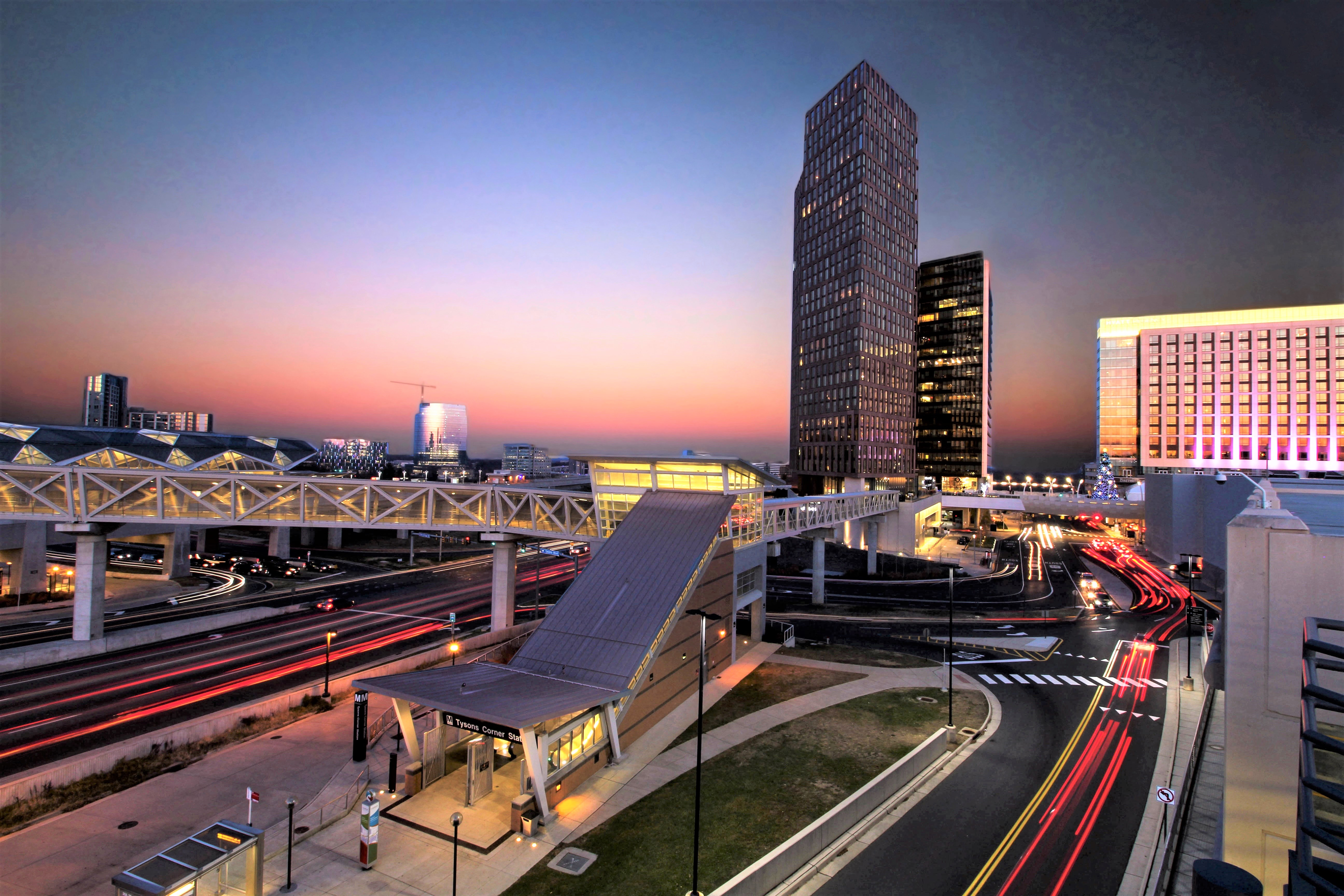
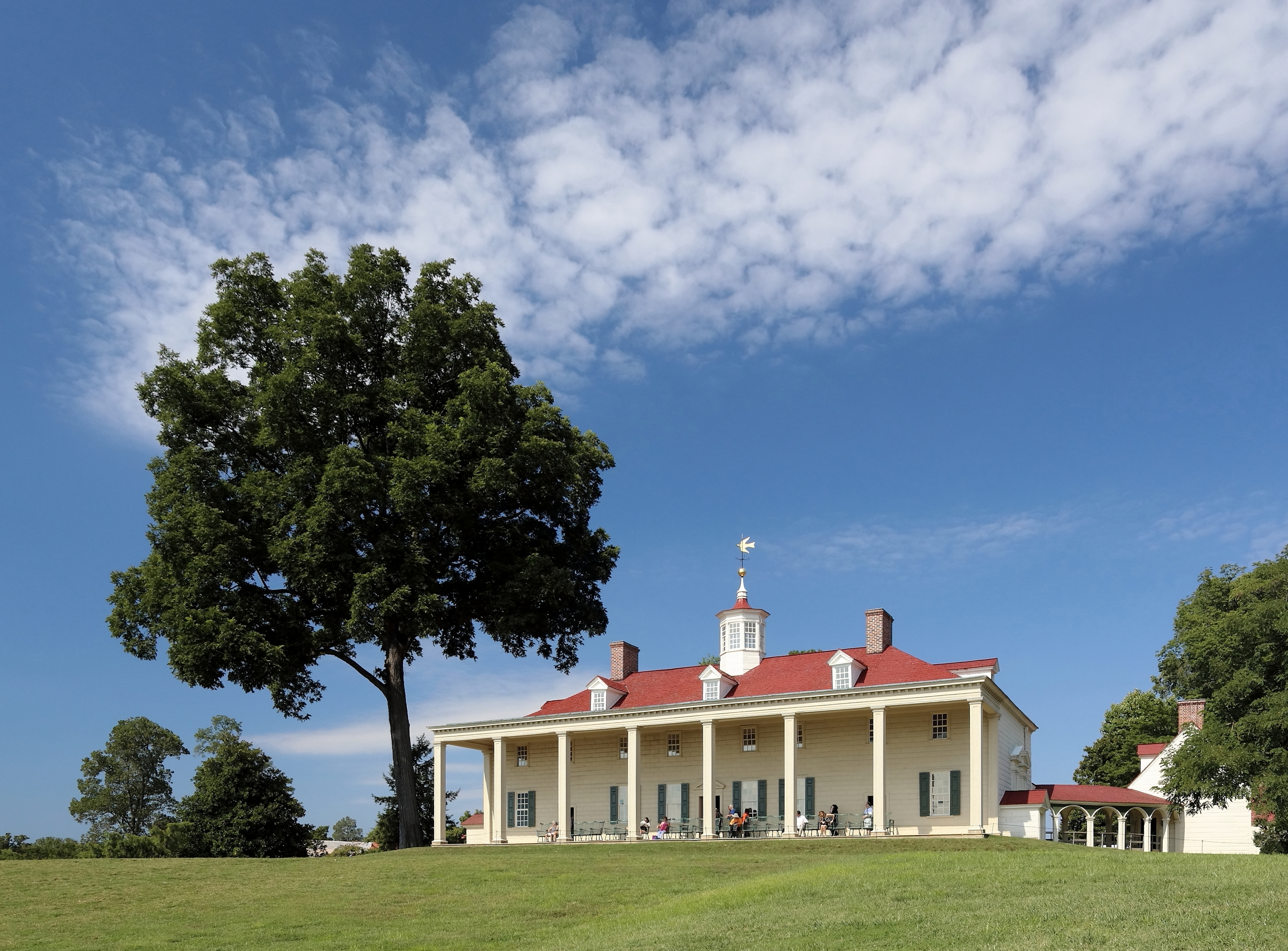
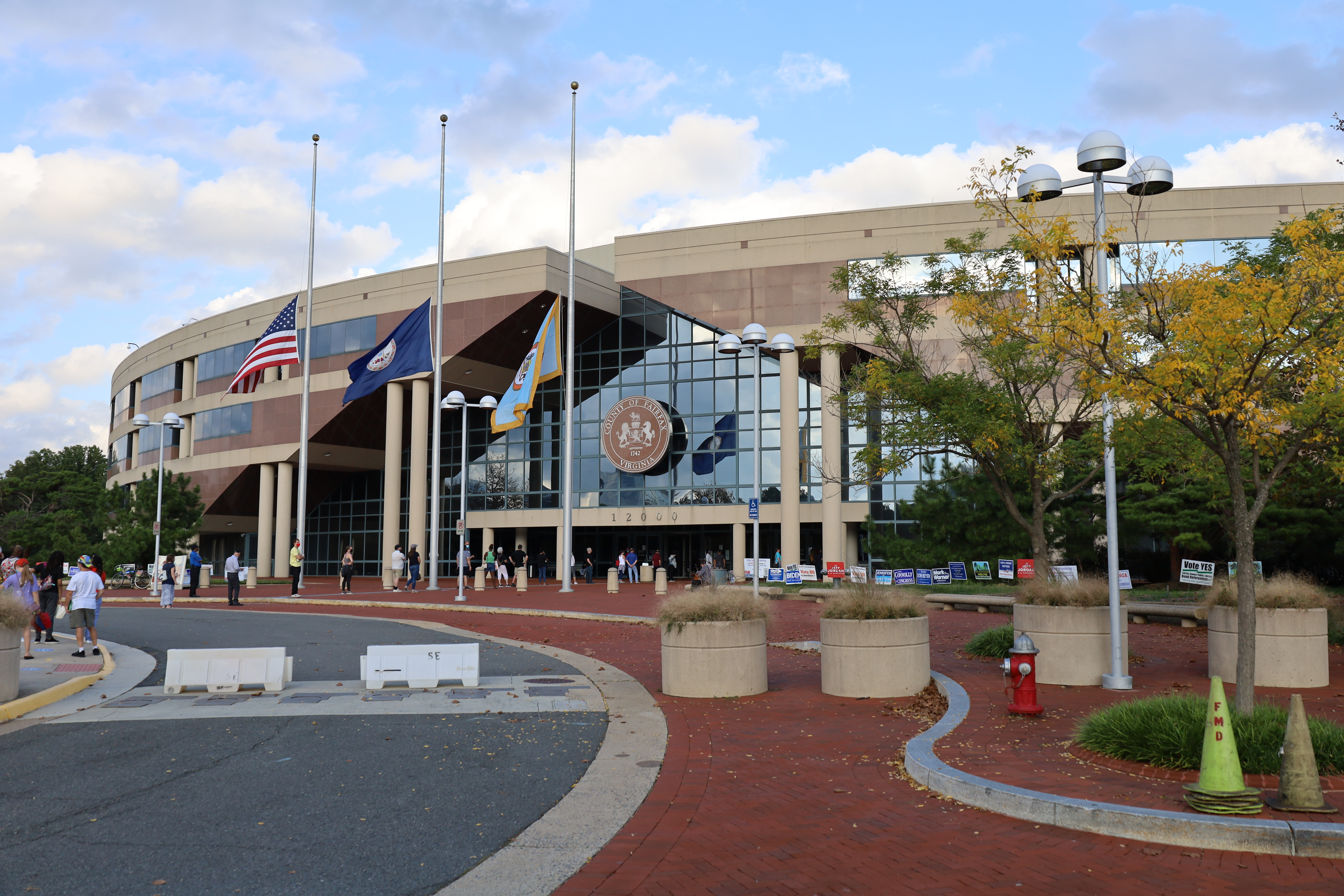
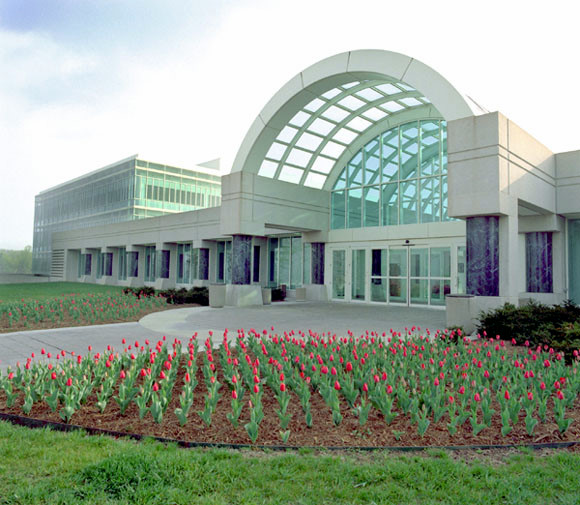
- Tysons Mount Vernon plantation Fairfax County Government Center CIA headquarters in Langley Dulles International Airport

- Flag Seal Logo

- Location within the U.S. state of Virginia
- Coordinates: 38.83°N 77.28°W
- Country: United States
- State: Virginia
- Founded: June 19, 1742
- Named for: Thomas Fairfax, 6th Lord Fairfax of Cameron
- Seat: Fairfax (independent city)^{1}
- Largest town: Centreville

Area
  - Total: 406 sq mi (1,050 km^{2})
  - Land: 391.02 sq mi (1,012.7 km^{2})
  - Water: 15.47 sq mi (40.1 km^{2}) 3.8%

Population (2020)
  - Total: 1,150,309
  - Estimate (2025): 1,167,873 ▲
  - Density: 2,941.82/sq mi (1,135.84/km^{2})

GDP
  - Total: $177.534 billion (2024)
- Time zone: UTC−5 (Eastern)
  - Summer (DST): UTC−4 (EDT)
- ZIP Codes: 20120, 20121, 20122, 20124, 20151, 20152, 20153, 20164, 20166, 20170, 20171, 20172, 20190, 20191, 20192, 20194, 20195, 20196, 22003, 22009, 22015, 22018, 22019, 22027, 22030, 22031, 22032, 22033, 22035, 22037, 22038, 22039, 22041, 22042, 22043, 22044, 22046, 22060, 22066, 22067, 22079, 22081, 22082, 22101, 22102, 22106, 22116, 22121, 22124, 22150, 22151, 22152, 22153, 22158, 22159, 22160, 22161, 22180, 22181, 22182, 22183, 22185, 22199, 22203, 22204, 22205, 22206, 22207, 22213, 22302, 22303, 22304, 22306, 22307, 22308, 22309, 22310, 22311, 22312, 22315
- Area code: 703, 571
- Congressional districts: 8th, 10th, 11th
- Website: fairfaxcounty.gov
- ^{1} Administrative and court offices are located in unincorporated areas in Fairfax County

Fairfax County, officially the County of Fairfax, is a county in the state of Virginia, United States. With a population of 1,150,309 as of the 2020 census, it is the most populous county in Virginia, the most populous jurisdiction in the Washington metropolitan area, and the most populous location in the Washington–Baltimore combined statistical area. The county seat is Fairfax, even though Fairfax is an independent city that, under Virginia law, is not part of Fairfax County.

The county is part of the Northern Virginia region and forms part of the suburban ring of Washington, D.C., the nation's capital. The county is predominantly suburban with some urban and rural pockets. It borders Montgomery County, Maryland to its north, Falls Church, Alexandria, Arlington County, and Prince George's County, Maryland to its east, Charles County, Maryland to its southeast, Prince William County to its southwest, and Loudoun County to its northwest.

The county is home to the offices of the director of national intelligence in McLean and the headquarters of four U.S. intelligence agencies: the Central Intelligence Agency at the George Bush Center for Intelligence in Langley, the National Geospatial-Intelligence Agency at Fort Belvoir, the National Reconnaissance Office in Chantilly, and the National Counterterrorism Center in McLean.

In academia, the county is home to the flagship campus of George Mason University in Fairfax, CIA University in Chantilly, Sherman Kent School for Intelligence Analysis in Reston, and several Northern Virginia Community College campuses. In the private sector, as of 2025, eleven of the Fortune 500 companies are headquartered in the county as of 2023.

In 2020, Fairfax County's median household income of $127,866 was the fifth-highest in the United States.

== History ==
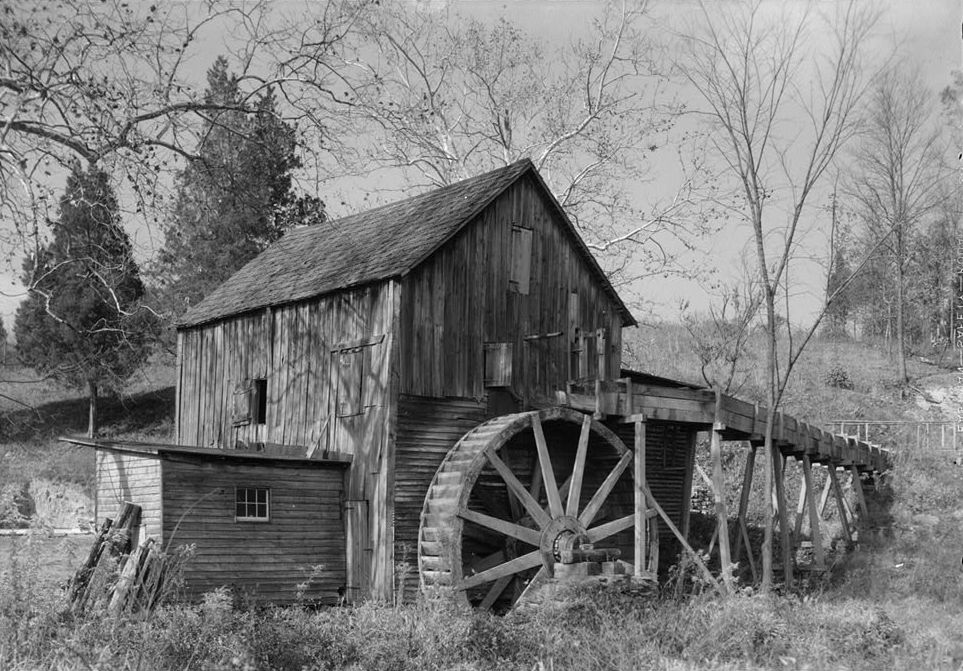
Piney Branch Mill in the county

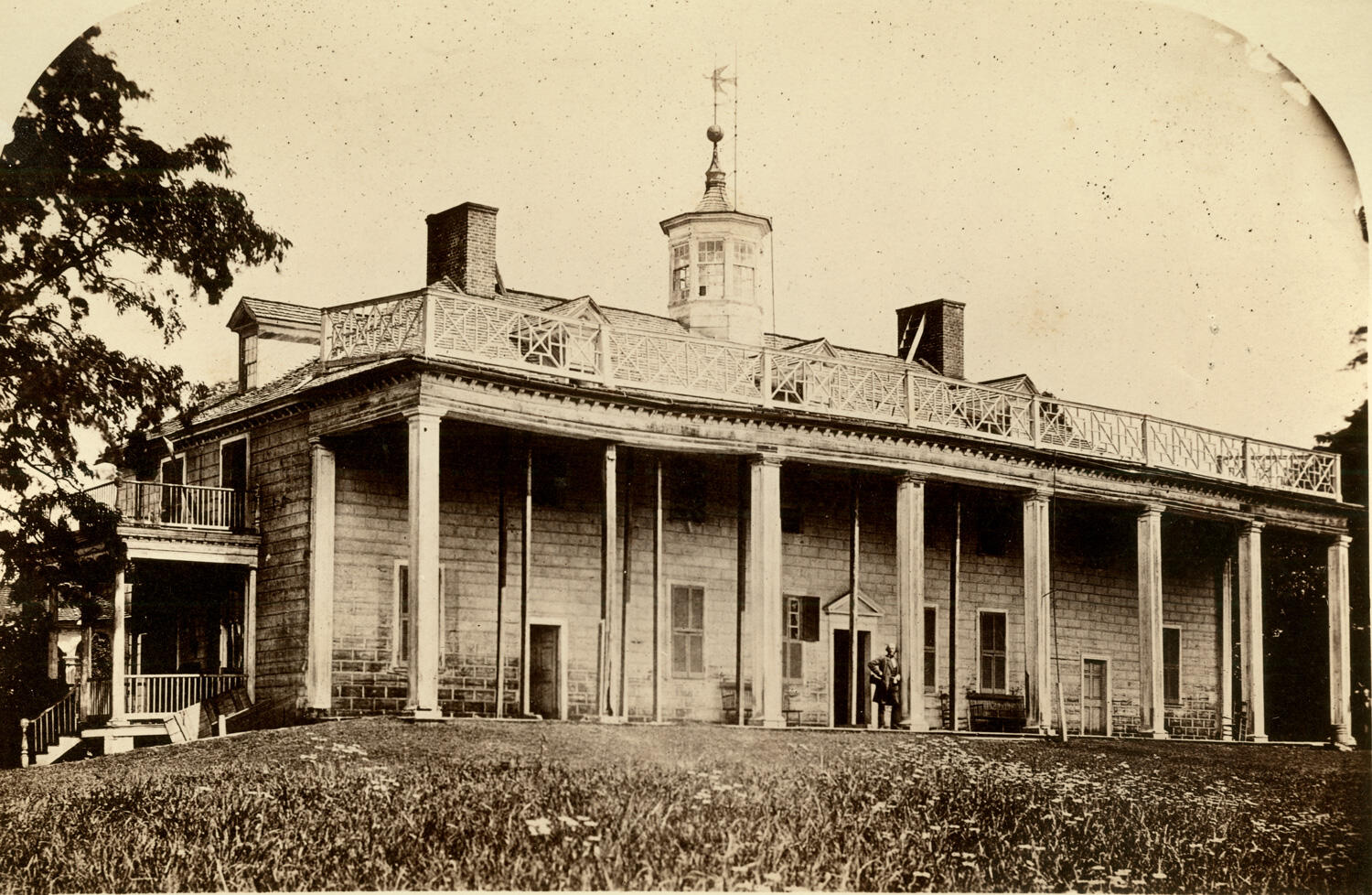
An 1858 photo of Mount Vernon, the home of George Washington

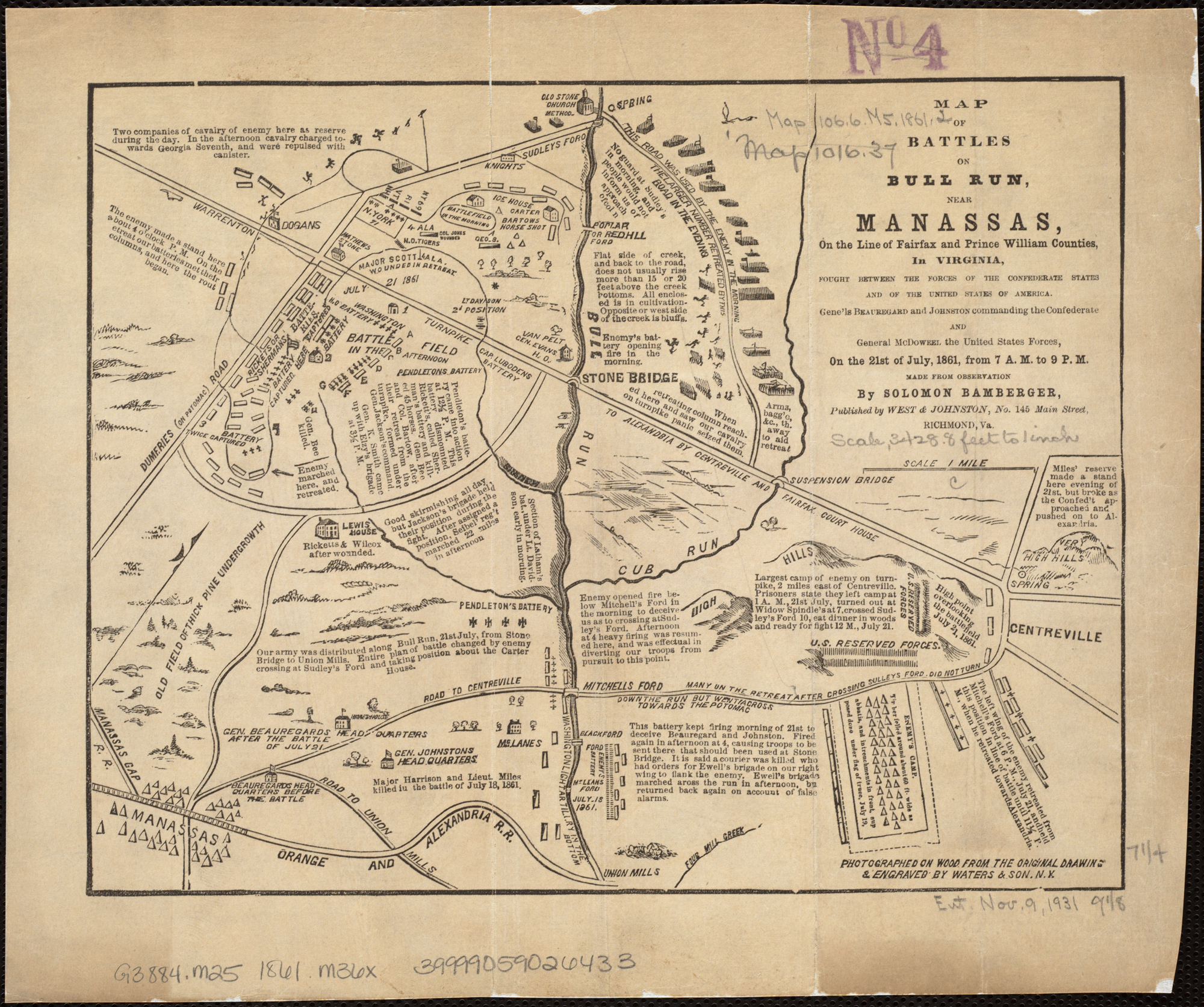
Map of the First Battle of Bull Run, an American Civil War battle fought near Manassas on July 21, 1861, between the Confederate and Union armies

Prior to European settlement, present-day Fairfax County was initially inhabited by the Algonquian-speaking Doeg tribe.

=== 17th century ===
In 1608, Captain John Smith documented the Doeg tribe's villages, which included Namassingakent and Nemaroughquand on the south bank of the Potomac River in present-day Fairfax County. By 1670, Virginian colonists from the Northern Neck region drove the Doeg Tribe out of present-day Fairfax County and into Maryland.

=== 18th century ===
Fairfax County was formed in 1742 from the northern part of Prince William County, and was named after Thomas Fairfax, 6th Lord Fairfax of Cameron, proprietor of the Northern Neck. The county's logo, seal and flag were adopted from the arms of Lord Fairfax of Cameron.

The county's initial settlements were along the Potomac River. George Washington settled in Fairfax County and built his home, Mount Vernon, facing the Potomac. Gunston Hall, the home of George Mason, is nearby. Fort Belvoir is partly on the estate of Belvoir Manor, built along the Potomac by William Fairfax in 1741.

Thomas Fairfax, the only member of the British nobility ever to reside in the colonies, lived at Belvoir before moving to the Shenandoah Valley. The Belvoir mansion and several of its outbuildings were destroyed by fire immediately after the Revolutionary War in 1783, and George Washington noted the plantation complex deteriorated into ruins.

In 1757, the northwestern two-thirds of Fairfax County became Loudoun County. In 1789, part of Fairfax County was ceded to the federal government to form Alexandria County, then part of the District of Columbia.

=== 19th century ===
Alexandria County was returned to Virginia in 1846, reduced in size by the secession of the independent city of Alexandria in 1870, and renamed Arlington County in 1920.

During the American Civil War the Battle of Chantilly, also known as Ox Hill, part of the Second Battle of Bull Run, was fought within Fairfax County. Other areas of Civil War conflict in the county included Minor's Hill, Munson's Hill, and Upton's Hill.

=== 20th century ===
The Fairfax County town of Falls Church became an independent city in 1948. The Fairfax County town of Fairfax was named an independent city in 1961.

The federal government's growth during and after World War II spurred rapid growth in the county and transformed it from a rural to suburban region. Large businesses began settling in the county, and the opening of Tysons Corner Center spurred the rise of Tysons, Virginia. The technology boom and a steady government-driven economy created rapid growth and an increasingly large and diverse population. The economy has also made Fairfax County one of the nation's wealthiest counties.

A general aviation airport along U.S. Route 50 west of Seven Corners, Falls Church Airpark, operated in the county from 1948 to 1960. The facility's 2,650-foot unpaved runway was used extensively by private pilots and civil defense officials. Residential development, multiple accidents, and the demand for retail space led to its closure in 1960.

== Geography and climate ==

According to the U.S. Census Bureau, the county has an area of 406 square miles (1,050 km^{2}), of which 391 square miles (1,010 km^{2}) is land and 15 square miles (39 km^{2}) (3.8%) is water. There are about 44,400,000 trees that create a canopy covering 55.4% of the total land area.

Fairfax County is bounded on the north and southeast by the Potomac River. Across the river to the northeast is Washington, D.C., across the river to the north is Montgomery County, Maryland, and across the river to the southeast are Prince George's County, Maryland and Charles County, Maryland. The county is partially bounded on the north and east by Arlington County and the independent cities of Alexandria and Falls Church. It is bounded on the west by Loudoun County, and on the south by Prince William County.

Most of the county lies in the Piedmont region, with rolling hills and deep stream valleys, such as Difficult Run and its tributaries. West of Route 28, the hills give way to a flat, gentle valley that stretches west to the Bull Run Mountains in Loudoun County. Elevations in the county range from near sea level along the tidal sections of the Potomac River in the southeast portion of the county to more than 500 feet (150 m) in the Tysons area.

In 2023, the plant hardiness zone shifted from 7a to 7b. The Fairfax County News Letter predicts that Fairfax will shift to zone 8 in the next few decades as temperatures rise.

=== Adjacent jurisdictions ===
- Alexandria – east
- Arlington County – east
- Charles County, Maryland – southeast
- Fairfax – surrounded by Fairfax County
- Falls Church – east
- Loudoun County – northwest
- Montgomery County, Maryland – north
- Prince George's County, Maryland – east
- Prince William County – southwest

== Geology ==
The Piedmont hills in the central county are made up of ancient metamorphic rocks such as schist, the roots of several ancestral ranges of the Appalachian Mountains. The western valley is floored with more recent shale and sandstone. This geology is similar to adjacent bands of rocks in Maryland and further south in Virginia along the eastern front of the Appalachian.

An area of 11 square miles (30 km^{2}) of the county is known to be underlain with natural asbestos. Much of the asbestos is known to emanate from fibrous tremolite or actinolite. The threat was discovered in 1987, prompting the county to establish laws to monitor air quality at construction sites, control soil taken from affected areas, and require freshly developed sites to lay 6 inches (150 mm) of clean, stable material over the ground.

During the construction of Centreville High School, for instance, a large amount of asbestos-laden soil was removed and then trucked to Vienna for the construction of the I-66/Nutley Street interchange. Fill dirt then had to be trucked in to make the site level. Marine clays can be found in widespread areas of the county east of Interstate 95, mostly in the Franconia and Mount Vernon districts. These clays contribute to soil instability, leading to significant construction challenges for builders.

== Demographics ==
=== Racial and ethnic composition ===
Fairfax County, Virginia – Racial and ethnic composition Note: the US Census treats Hispanic/Latino as an ethnic category. This table excludes Latinos from the racial categories and assigns them to a separate category. Hispanics/Latinos may be of any race.
Race / Ethnicity (NH = Non-Hispanic)	Pop 1980	Pop 1990	Pop 2000	Pop 2010	Pop 2020	% 1980	% 1990	% 2000	% 2010	% 2020
White alone (NH)	514,330	633,935	624,296	590,622	542,001	86.17%	77.44%	64.38%	54.60%	47.12%
Black or African American alone (NH)	34,618	61,964	81,287	96,078	108,339	5.80%	7.57%	8.38%	8.88%	9.42%
Native American or Alaska Native alone (NH)	1,235	1,838	1,834	1,843	1,437	0.21%	0.22%	0.19%	0.17%	0.12%
Asian alone (NH)	22,725	68,140	125,585	188,737	233,858	3.81%	8.32%	12.95%	17.45%	20.33%
Native Hawaiian or Pacific Islander alone (NH)	x	x	616	779	772	x	x	0.06%	0.07%	0.07%
Other race alone (NH)	4,458	833	2,473	3,359	7,046	0.75%	0.10%	0.26%	0.31%	0.61%
Mixed race or Multiracial (NH)	x	x	26,700	31,826	57,622	x	x	2.75%	2.94%	5.01%
Hispanic or Latino (any race)	19,535	51,874	106,958	168,482	199,234	3.27%	6.34%	11.03%	15.58%	17.32%
Total	596,901	818,584	969,749	1,081,726	1,150,309	100.00%	100.00%	100.00%	100.00%	100.00%

Racial / Ethnic Profile of places in Fairfax County, Virginia (2020 Census)
Following is a table of cities, villages, and census designated places in Fairfax County, Virginia. Data for the United States (with and without Puerto Rico), the state of Virginia, and Fairfax County itself have been included for comparison purposes.
The majority racial/ethnic group is coded per the key below. Communities that extend into and adjacent county or counties are delineated with a ‡ followed by an accompanying explanatory note. The full population of each community has been tabulated including the population in adjacent counties.

Majority minority with no dominant group
Majority White
Majority Black
Majority Hispanic
Majority Asian

Racial and ethnic composition of places in Fairfax County (2020 Census) (NH = Non-Hispanic) Note: the US Census treats Hispanic/Latino as an ethnic category. This table excludes Latinos from the racial categories and assigns them to a separate category. Hispanics/Latinos may be of any race.
Place	Designation	Total Population	White alone (NH)	%	Black or African American alone (NH)	%	Native American or Alaska Native alone (NH)	%	Asian alone (NH)	%	Pacific Islander alone (NH)	%	Other race alone (NH)	%	Mixed race or Multiracial (NH)	%	Hispanic or Latino (any race)	%
United States of America (50 states and D.C.)	x	331,449,281	191,697,647	57.84%	39,940,338	12.05%	2,251,699	0.68%	19,618,719	5.92%	622,018	0.19%	1,689,833	0.51%	13,548,983	4.09%	62,080,044	18.73%
United States of America (50 states, D.C., and Puerto Rico)	x	334,735,155	191,722,195	57.28%	39,944,624	11.93%	2,252,011	0.67%	19,621,465	5.86%	622,109	0.19%	1,692,341	0.51%	13,551,323	4.05%	65,329,087	19.52%
Virginia	State	8,631,393	5,058,363	58.60%	1,578,090	18.28%	19,080	0.22%	610,612	7.07%	6,195	0.07%	45,394	0.53%	404,910	4.69%	908,749	10.53%
Fairfax County	County	1,150,309	542,001	47.12%	108,339	9.42%	1,437	0.12%	233,858	20.33%	772	0.07%	7,046	0.61%	57,622	5.01%	199,234	17.32%
Clifton	City	42,772	14,816	34.64%	4,914	11.49%	65	0.15%	2,703	6.32%	19	0.04%	317	0.74%	1,593	3.72%	18,345	42.89%
Herndon	City	24,655	8,025	32.55%	2,019	8.19%	43	0.17%	4,320	17.52%	5	0.02%	158	0.64%	838	3.40%	9,247	37.51%
Vienna	City	16,473	10,451	63.44%	401	2.43%	18	0.11%	2,672	16.22%	13	0.08%	108	0.66%	914	5.55%	1,896	11.51%
Annandale	CDP	43,363	12,719	29.33%	3,885	8.96%	53	0.12%	10,611	24.47%	14	0.03%	193	0.45%	1,618	3.73%	14,270	32.91%
Bailey's Crossroads	CDP	24,749	7,026	28.39%	3,917	15.83%	42	0.17%	3,210	12.97%	4	0.02%	191	0.77%	911	3.68%	9,448	38.18%
Belle Haven	CDP	6,851	4,681	68.33%	452	6.60%	10	0.15%	277	4.04%	3	0.04%	34	0.50%	272	3.97%	1,122	16.38%
Braddock	CDP	6,549	3,851	58.80%	248	3.79%	5	0.08%	1,560	23.82%	2	0.03%	43	0.66%	422	6.44%	418	6.38%
Bull Run	CDP	6,972	4,418	63.37%	286	4.10%	3	0.04%	1,336	19.16%	3	0.04%	58	0.83%	398	5.71%	470	6.74%
Burke	CDP	42,312	22,856	54.02%	2,978	7.04%	52	0.12%	7,749	18.31%	22	0.05%	240	0.57%	2,407	5.69%	6,008	14.20%
Burke Centre	CDP	17,518	9,936	56.72%	1,071	6.11%	18	0.10%	2,755	15.73%	16	0.09%	106	0.61%	1,053	6.01%	2,563	14.63%
Centreville	CDP	73,518	29,997	40.80%	5,488	7.46%	113	0.15%	21,976	29.89%	64	0.09%	421	0.57%	3,637	4.95%	11,822	16.08%
Chantilly	CDP	24,301	8,748	36.00%	1,423	5.86%	43	0.18%	8,125	33.43%	7	0.03%	147	0.60%	915	3.77%	4,893	20.13%
Crosspointe	CDP	5,722	3,783	66.11%	391	6.83%	2	0.03%	768	13.42%	2	0.03%	22	0.38%	367	6.41%	387	6.76%
Difficult Run	CDP	10,600	7,635	72.03%	149	1.41%	6	0.06%	1,561	14.73%	3	0.03%	75	0.71%	575	5.42%	596	5.62%
Dranesville	CDP	11,785	7,757	65.82%	486	4.12%	8	0.07%	1,758	14.92%	9	0.08%	84	0.71%	632	5.36%	1,051	8.92%
Dunn Loring	CDP	9,464	5,482	57.92%	397	4.19%	10	0.11%	2,248	23.75%	3	0.03%	62	0.66%	562	5.94%	700	7.40%
Fair Lakes	CDP	8,404	3,230	38.43%	792	9.42%	6	0.07%	3,120	37.13%	6	0.07%	75	0.89%	468	5.57%	707	8.41%
Fair Oaks	CDP	34,052	14,905	43.77%	3,547	10.42%	29	0.09%	9,900	29.07%	23	0.07%	166	0.49%	1,942	5.70%	3,540	10.40%
Fairfax Station	CDP	12,420	8,118	65.36%	545	4.39%	11	0.09%	1,914	15.41%	8	0.06%	74	0.60%	707	5.69%	1,043	8.40%
Floris	CDP	8,341	3,874	46.45%	355	4.26%	8	0.10%	3,283	39.36%	3	0.04%	49	0.59%	371	4.45%	398	4.77%
Fort Belvoir	CDP	7,637	4,158	54.45%	1,204	15.77%	15	0.20%	247	3.23%	64	0.84%	40	0.52%	632	8.28%	1,277	16.72%
Fort Hunt	CDP	17,231	14,204	82.43%	356	2.07%	23	0.13%	515	2.99%	14	0.08%	99	0.57%	849	4.93%	1,171	6.80%
Franconia	CDP	18,943	8,170	43.13%	3,766	19.88%	54	0.29%	3,108	16.41%	39	0.21%	104	0.55%	1,126	5.94%	2,576	13.60%
Franklin Farm	CDP	19,189	11,637	60.64%	556	2.90%	7	0.04%	4,639	24.18%	6	0.03%	81	0.42%	978	5.10%	1,285	6.70%
George Mason	CDP	11,162	4,537	40.65%	2,186	19.58%	84	0.75%	1,912	17.13%	0	0.00%	46	0.41%	540	4.84%	1,857	16.64%
Great Falls	CDP	15,953	10,659	66.82%	300	1.88%	21	0.13%	3,160	19.81%	3	0.02%	99	0.62%	864	5.42%	847	5.31%
Great Falls Crossing	CDP	1,392	794	57.04%	55	3.95%	1	0.07%	322	23.13%	2	0.14%	12	0.86%	111	7.97%	95	6.82%
Greenbriar	CDP	8,421	4,435	52.67%	437	5.19%	4	0.05%	2,118	25.15%	4	0.05%	47	0.56%	412	4.89%	964	11.45%
Groveton	CDP	15,725	5,538	35.22%	2,868	18.24%	17	0.11%	1,303	8.29%	16	0.10%	96	0.61%	610	3.88%	5,277	33.56%
Hayfield	CDP	4,154	2,769	66.66%	464	11.17%	11	0.26%	253	6.09%	6	0.14%	16	0.39%	235	5.66%	400	9.63%
Huntington	CDP	13,749	6,439	46.83%	2,094	15.23%	19	0.14%	1,435	10.44%	12	0.09%	96	0.70%	694	5.05%	2,960	21.53%
Hutchison	CDP	6,231	1,106	17.75%	767	12.31%	8	0.13%	1,432	22.98%	1	0.02%	33	0.53%	188	3.02%	2,696	43.27%
Hybla Valley	CDP	16,319	3,406	20.87%	4,599	28.18%	19	0.12%	1,521	9.32%	13	0.08%	75	0.46%	578	3.54%	6,108	37.43%
Idylwood	CDP	17,954	7,930	44.17%	953	5.31%	24	0.13%	4,351	24.23%	12	0.07%	125	0.70%	898	5.00%	3,661	20.39%
Kings Park	CDP	4,537	2,413	53.18%	224	4.94%	12	0.26%	791	17.43%	11	0.24%	27	0.60%	264	5.82%	795	17.52%
Kings Park West	CDP	13,465	7,905	58.71%	657	4.88%	17	0.13%	2,508	18.63%	10	0.07%	94	0.70%	706	5.24%	1,568	11.65%
Kingstowne	CDP	16,825	8,172	48.57%	3,328	19.78%	12	0.07%	1,994	11.85%	24	0.14%	105	0.62%	1,120	6.66%	2,070	12.30%
Lake Barcroft	CDP	9,770	5,463	55.92%	773	7.91%	20	0.20%	1,140	11.67%	5	0.05%	51	0.52%	456	4.67%	1,862	19.06%
Laurel Hill	CDP	8,307	2,644	31.83%	1,870	22.51%	6	0.07%	2,234	26.89%	20	0.24%	49	0.59%	639	7.69%	845	10.17%
Lincolnia	CDP	22,922	7,202	31.42%	4,758	20.76%	21	0.09%	4,006	17.48%	15	0.07%	163	0.71%	987	4.31%	5,770	25.17%
Long Branch	CDP	7,890	4,464	56.58%	246	3.12%	3	0.04%	2,024	25.65%	3	0.04%	32	0.41%	353	4.47%	765	9.70%
Lorton	CDP	20,072	5,126	25.54%	6,421	31.99%	29	0.14%	3,678	18.32%	33	0.16%	130	0.65%	966	4.81%	3,689	18.38%
Mantua	CDP	7,503	4,436	59.12%	279	3.72%	14	0.19%	1,579	21.04%	1	0.01%	39	0.52%	447	5.96%	708	9.44%
Mason Neck	CDP	2,025	1,525	75.31%	86	4.25%	5	0.25%	99	4.89%	1	0.05%	16	0.79%	128	6.32%	165	8.15%
McLean	CDP	50,773	32,845	64.69%	996	1.96%	30	0.06%	10,658	20.99%	17	0.03%	353	0.70%	2,856	5.63%	3,018	5.94%
McNair	CDP	21,598	5,283	24.46%	3,618	16.75%	43	0.20%	9,502	43.99%	6	0.03%	110	0.51%	781	3.62%	2,255	10.44%
Merrifield	CDP	20,488	8,349	40.75%	1,334	6.51%	37	0.18%	6,386	31.17%	12	0.06%	96	0.47%	1,181	5.76%	3,093	15.10%
Mount Vernon	CDP	12,914	7,605	58.89%	1,657	12.83%	22	0.17%	871	6.74%	13	0.10%	87	0.67%	570	4.41%	2,089	16.18%
Navy	CDP	4,327	1,560	36.05%	238	5.50%	3	0.07%	2,169	50.13%	0	0.00%	16	0.37%	185	4.28%	156	3.61%
Newington	CDP	13,223	5,697	43.08%	2,206	16.68%	20	0.15%	2,234	16.89%	9	0.07%	86	0.65%	784	5.93%	2,187	16.54%
Newington Forest	CDP	12,957	6,283	48.49%	1,458	11.25%	12	0.09%	2,280	17.60%	24	0.19%	83	0.64%	851	6.57%	1,966	15.17%
North Springfield	CDP	7,430	2,619	35.25%	332	4.47%	2	0.03%	1,898	25.55%	2	0.03%	65	0.87%	283	3.81%	2,229	30.00%
Oakton	CDP	36,732	18,765	51.09%	2,055	5.59%	20	0.05%	9,061	24.67%	21	0.06%	232	0.63%	2,064	5.62%	4,514	12.29%
Pimmit Hills	CDP	6,569	3,147	47.91%	217	3.30%	8	0.12%	1,589	24.19%	1	0.02%	45	0.69%	369	5.62%	1,193	18.16%
Ravensworth	CDP	2,680	1,263	47.13%	67	2.50%	5	0.19%	698	26.04%	1	0.04%	22	0.82%	134	5.00%	490	18.28%
Reston	CDP	63,226	37,666	59.57%	5,803	9.18%	57	0.09%	7,058	11.16%	27	0.04%	425	0.67%	3,518	5.56%	8,672	13.72%
Rose Hill	CDP	21,045	10,509	49.94%	2,437	11.58%	29	0.14%	2,266	10.77%	11	0.05%	160	0.76%	1,103	5.24%	4,530	21.53%
Seven Corners	CDP	9,131	2,029	22.22%	744	8.15%	6	0.07%	1,796	19.67%	5	0.05%	59	0.65%	285	3.12%	4,207	46.07%
South Run	CDP	6,462	4,428	68.52%	384	5.94%	6	0.09%	831	12.86%	1	0.02%	19	0.29%	397	6.14%	396	6.13%
Springfield	CDP	31,339	9,546	30.46%	3,065	9.78%	34	0.11%	8,344	26.62%	11	0.04%	175	0.56%	1,115	3.56%	9,049	28.87%
Sully Square	CDP	2,300	522	22.70%	173	7.52%	5	0.22%	1,405	61.09%	0	0.00%	14	0.61%	96	4.17%	85	3.70%
Tysons	CDP	26,374	12,455	47.22%	1,633	6.19%	10	0.04%	8,528	32.33%	7	0.03%	178	0.67%	1,288	4.88%	2,275	8.63%
Union Mill	CDP	4,997	3,285	65.74%	140	2.80%	6	0.12%	984	19.69%	2	0.04%	30	0.60%	243	4.86%	307	6.14%
Wakefield	CDP	11,805	7,537	63.85%	372	3.15%	9	0.08%	2,199	18.63%	3	0.03%	89	0.75%	647	5.48%	949	8.04%
West Falls Church	CDP	30,243	11,728	38.78%	1,282	4.24%	40	0.13%	5,517	18.24%	12	0.04%	220	0.73%	1,104	3.65%	10,340	34.19%
West Springfield	CDP	23,369	11,864	50.77%	2,218	9.49%	46	0.20%	4,002	17.13%	17	0.07%	168	0.72%	1,419	6.07%	3,635	15.55%
Wolf Trap	CDP	16,496	11,105	67.32%	287	1.74%	2	0.01%	3,126	18.95%	4	0.02%	116	0.70%	926	5.61%	930	5.64%
Woodburn	CDP	8,797	4,164	47.33%	540	6.14%	13	0.15%	1,906	21.67%	4	0.05%	71	0.81%	540	6.14%	1,559	17.72%
Woodlawn	CDP	20,859	3,211	15.39%	6,338	30.38%	32	0.15%	1,990	9.54%	22	0.11%	108	0.52%	667	3.20%	8,491	40.71%

=== 2020 census ===
Historical population
Census	Pop.	Note	%±
1790	12,320		—
1800	13,317		8.1%
1810	13,111		−1.5%
1820	11,404		−13.0%
1830	9,204		−19.3%
1840	9,370		1.8%
1850	10,682		14.0%
1860	11,834		10.8%
1870	12,952		9.4%
1880	16,025		23.7%
1890	16,655		3.9%
1900	18,580		11.6%
1910	20,536		10.5%
1920	21,943		6.9%
1930	25,264		15.1%
1940	40,929		62.0%
1950	98,557		140.8%
1960	275,002		179.0%
1970	455,021		65.5%
1980	596,901		31.2%
1990	818,584		37.1%
2000	969,749		18.5%
2010	1,081,726		11.5%
2020	1,150,309		6.3%
2025 (est.)	1,167,873	▲	1.5%
U.S. Decennial Census; 1790–1960 1900–1990; 1990–2000 2010 2020

As of the 2020 census, the county had a population of 1,150,309. The median age was 38.3 years. 23.3% of residents were under the age of 18 and 13.8% of residents were 65 years of age or older. For every 100 females there were 97.1 males, and for every 100 females age 18 and over there were 94.6 males age 18 and over.

The racial makeup of the county was 49.5% White, 9.6% Black or African American, 0.6% American Indian and Alaska Native, 20.4% Asian, 0.1% Native Hawaiian and Pacific Islander, 8.6% from some other race, and 11.3% from two or more races. Hispanic or Latino residents of any race comprised 17.3% of the population.

98.5% of residents lived in urban areas, while 1.5% lived in rural areas.

There were 411,055 households in the county, of which 35.3% had children under the age of 18 living with them and 23.3% had a female householder with no spouse or partner present. About 22.6% of all households were made up of individuals and 7.8% had someone living alone who was 65 years of age or older.

There were 427,149 housing units, of which 3.8% were vacant. Among occupied housing units, 65.7% were owner-occupied and 34.3% were renter-occupied. The homeowner vacancy rate was 0.7% and the rental vacancy rate was 5.4%.

The median income for a household in the county was $145,164, and the median income for a family was $174,085. 7.5% of the population were military veterans, and 65.5% had a bachelors degree or higher. In the county 5.6% of the population was below the poverty line, including 5.6% of those under age 18 and 5.7% of those age 65 or over, with 7.2% of the population without health insurance.

=== Socioeconomic characteristics ===
The median income for a household in the county was $145,164, and the median income for a family was $174,085. 7.5% of the population were military veterans, and 65.5% had a bachelors degree or higher. In the county 5.6% of the population was below the poverty line, including 5.6% of those under age 18 and 5.7% of those age 65 or over, with 7.2% of the population without health insurance.

== Education ==
=== Primary education ===
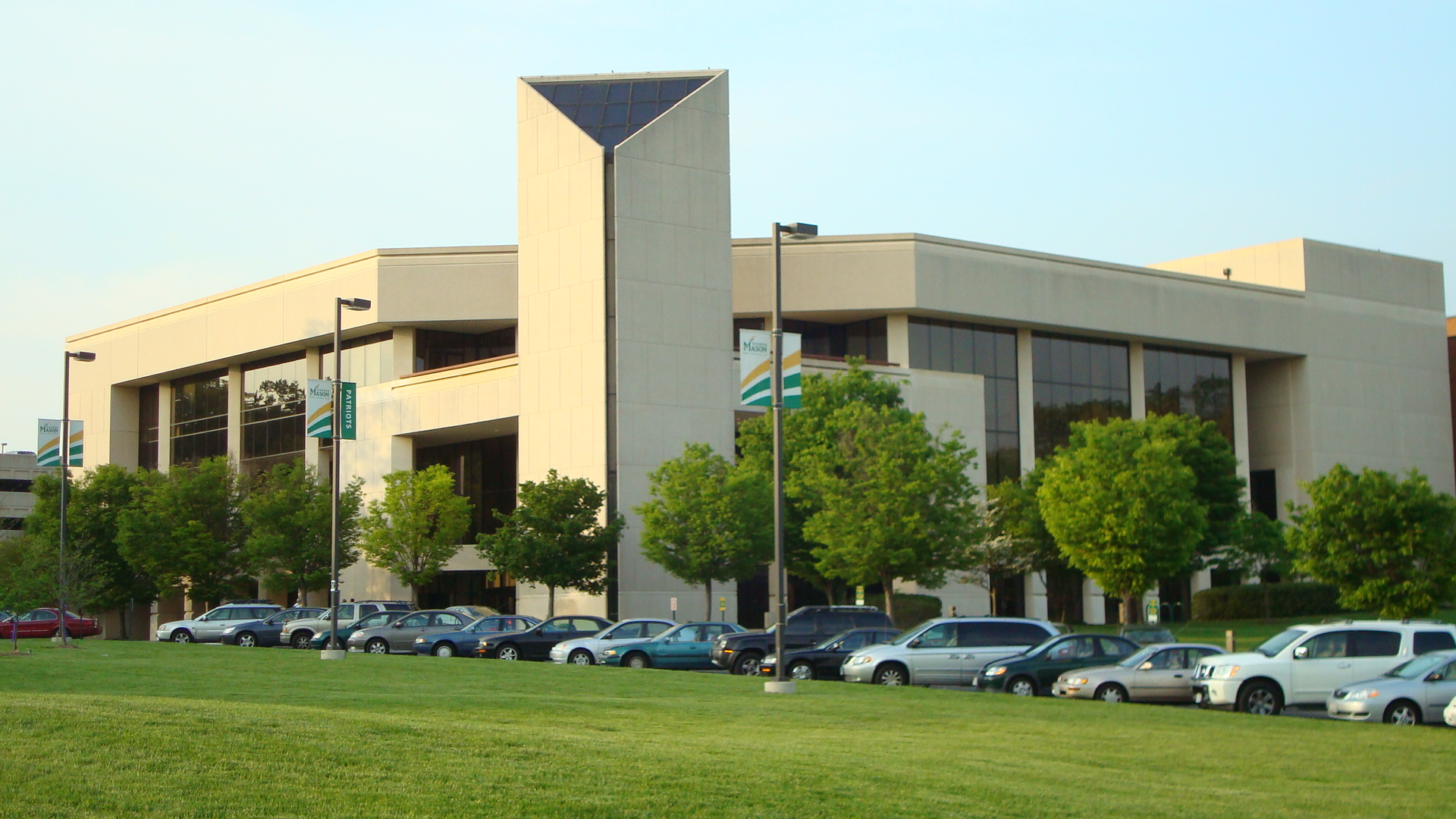
George Mason University's performing arts center in Fairfax

The county is served by the Fairfax County Public Schools system, to which the county government allocates 52.2% of its budget. Including state and federal government contributions, along with citizen and corporate contributions, this brings the 2023 budget for the school system to $3.5 billion. The school system has estimated that, based on the 2023 fiscal year budget, the county would spend $18,772 on each student.

The Fairfax County Public School system contains the Thomas Jefferson High School for Science and Technology, a Virginia Governor's School. TJHSST consistently ranks at or near the top of all U.S. high schools due to the extraordinary number of National Merit semifinalists and finalists, its students' high average SAT scores, and the number of students who annually perform nationally recognized research in the sciences and engineering. A Governor's School, TJHSST draws students from Fairfax County along with other Northern Virginia counties, cities, and towns.

Catholic elementary and middle schools in the county fall under the Roman Catholic Diocese of Arlington and include Paul VI Catholic High School, Fairfax County's diocese-run Catholic high school, and Oakcrest School, an all-girls Catholic school in Fairfax County, which is not run by the diocese.

=== Colleges and universities ===
George Mason University is just outside the city of Fairfax, near the geographic center of Fairfax County. Northern Virginia Community College (NVCC) serves Fairfax County with campuses in Annandale and Springfield and a center in Reston that is a satellite branch of the Loudoun campus. The NVCC Alexandria campus borders Fairfax County. The Central Intelligence Agency University and its Sherman Kent School for Intelligence Analysis are both located in Fairfax County, specifically in Chantilly and Reston respectively. George Mason University faculty have twice won the Nobel Prize in Economics. George Mason University economics professors James M. Buchanan and Vernon L. Smith won it in 1986 and 2002, respectively.

The University of Fairfax, a for-profit proprietary college and alleged diploma mill was once headquartered in Vienna, Virginia. Virginia Commonwealth University's School of Medicine recently constructed a medical campus wing at Inova Fairfax Hospital in order to allow third- and fourth-year medical students to study at other state-of-the-art facilities in Northern Virginia.

== Economy ==
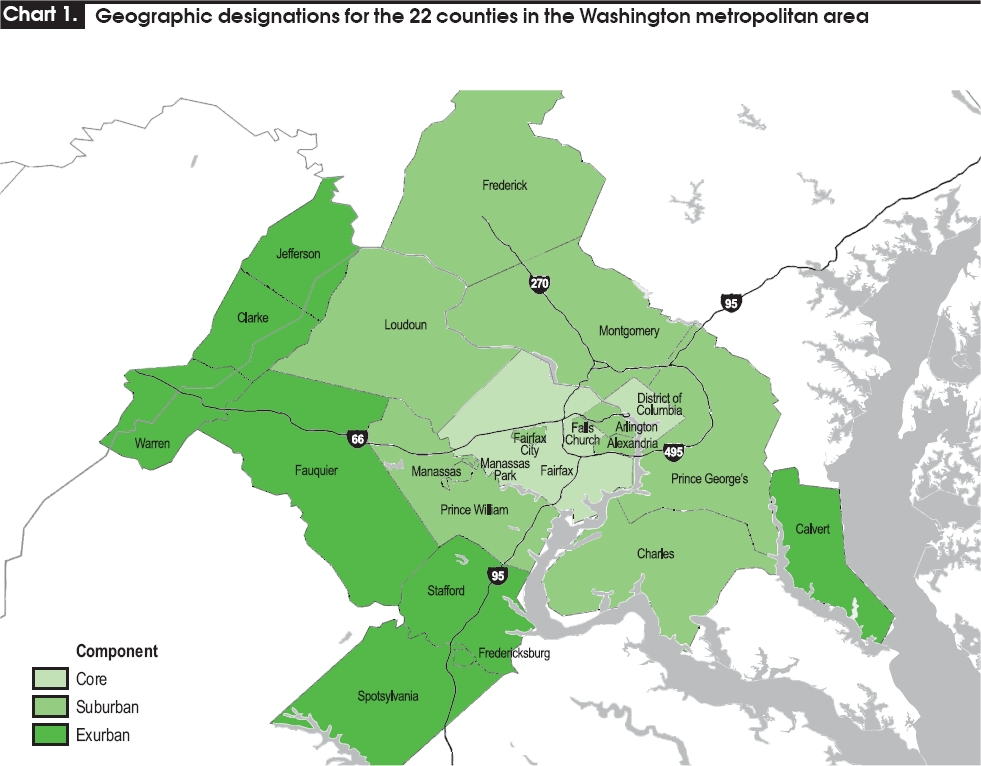
In 2007, a U.S. Department of Labor study described Fairfax County as the second economic pillar of the Washington metropolitan area economy after Washington, D.C.; in November 2007, Time magazine described it as "one of the great economic success stories of our time."

Fairfax County's economy revolves around professional services and technology. Many residents work for the government or contractors of the federal government. The government is the largest employer, with Fort Belvoir in southern Fairfax the county's single largest source of federal employment. Fairfax County has a gross county product of approximately $95 billion.

Major employers in the county include Airbus, Volkswagen Group of America, Hilton Worldwide, DXC Technology, Northrop Grumman, Science Applications International Corporation (SAIC), Leidos, Booz Allen Hamilton, Gannett, Capital One, General Dynamics, ICF International, Freddie Mac, Sallie Mae, ManTech International, Mars, NII, and NVR. The county is home to eleven Fortune 500 company headquarters, 11 Hispanic 500 companies, and five companies on the Black Enterprise 500 list.

The county's economy is supported by the Fairfax County Economic Development Authority, which provides services and information to promote Fairfax County as a leading business and technology center. The FCEDA is the nation's largest non-state economic development authority. Fairfax County is also home to the Northern Virginia Technology Council, a trade association for local technology companies. Fairfax County has a higher concentration of high-tech workers than Silicon Valley.

=== Tysons ===
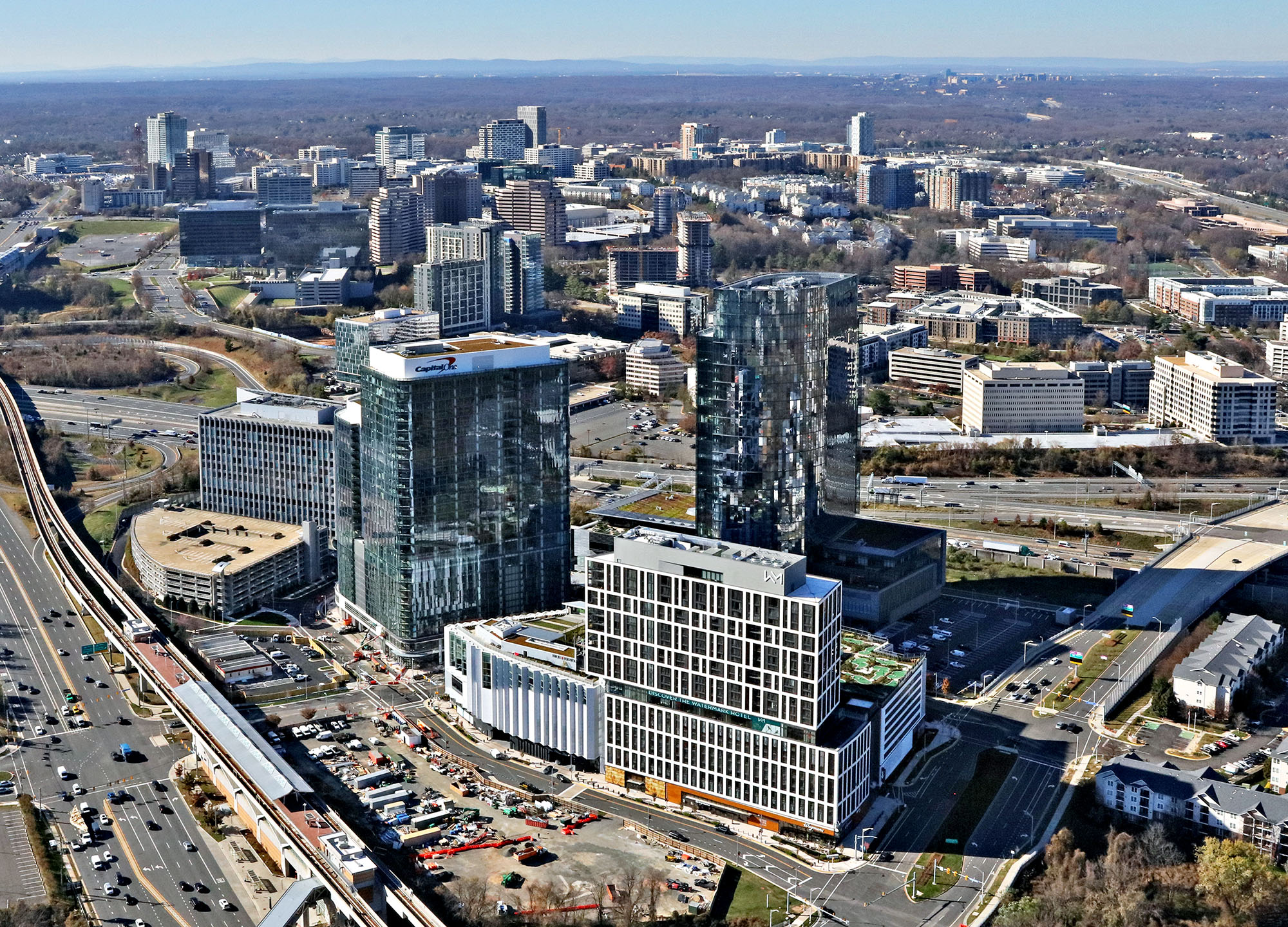
Tysons, a leading business center and one of the nation's largest business districts.

Tysons, located in the county, is Virginia's largest office market and the nation's largest suburban business district, with 26,600,000 square feet (2,470,000 m^{2}) of office space. It is the country's 12th-largest business district and is expected to grow substantially in the coming decades. It contains a quarter of the county's total office space inventory, which was 105,200,000 square feet (9,770,000 m^{2}) as of 2006, representing roughly the same size as the Lower Manhattan region of New York City.

In October 2011, Forbes described the area as "the place where the Internet was invented, but today it looks increasingly like the center of the global military-industrial complex", because it is home to the nation's first ISPs, many of which are now defunct, and attracts numerous defense contractors that have relocated from other states to or near Tysons Corner.

Tysons draws over 100,000 workers from around the Washington metropolitan area, and draws 55,000 shoppers daily to its two super-regional malls, Tysons Corner Center and Tysons Galleria, compared to 62,500 shoppers daily in Washington, D.C..

After years of delays attributed to stalling and controversy, the $5.2 billion expansion of the Washington Metro Silver Line in Virginia from Washington, D.C., to Dulles International Airport was funded by the Federal Transit Administration in December 2008. The Silver Line added four stations in Tysons, including a station between Tysons Corner Center and Tysons Galleria.

Along with the expansion of Washington Metro, Fairfax County government has a plan to "urbanize" the Tysons area. The plan calls for a private-public partnership and a grid-like street system to make Tysons a more urban environment, tripling available housing to allow more workers to live near their workplaces. The goal is to have 95% of Tysons Corner within 1/2-mile (800 m) of a metro station.

=== Top employers ===
According to the county's 2025 Annual Comprehensive Financial Report, the county's largest employers are:

#	Employer	# of employees	% of total county employment
1	U.S. federal government	28,126	4.41
2	Fairfax County Public Schools	26,829	4.20
3	Inova Health System	26,000	4.07
4	Fairfax County government	12,000	1.88
5	George Mason University	5,000-9,999	1.18
6	Booz Allen Hamilton	5,000-9,999	1.18
7	Amazon	5,000-9,999	1.18
8	Capital One	5,000-9,999	1.18
9	SAIC	5,000-9,999	1.18
10	Federal Home Loan Mortgage Corporation	5,000-9,999	1.18

== Arts and culture ==
Wolf Trap National Park for the Performing Arts

Annual festivals include the "Celebrate Fairfax!" festival held in June at the Fairfax County Government Center in Fairfax, the Tephra Fine Arts Festival held in May at Reston Town Center in Reston, and the International Children's Festival held in September at the Wolf Trap National Park for the Performing Arts, a performing arts center in Wolf Trap.

Fairfax County supports a summer concert series held in multiple venues throughout the county on various nights. The concert series are called Arts in the Parks, Braddock Nights, Franconia District Nights, Mt. Vernon Nights, Nottoway Nights, Spotlight by Starlight, Sounds of Summer and Starlight Cinema.

Capital One Hall, part of the Capital One Headquarters Complex in Tysons, is a major performing arts center that opened in 2021 and seats 1,600 in its main theater.

EagleBank Arena, originally known as the Patriot Center, is located on the Fairfax campus of George Mason University just outside Fairfax, hosts concerts and shows. The nearby Center for the Arts at George Mason is a major year-round arts venue, and the Workhouse Arts Center in Lorton, Virginia includes studios for artists, event facilities for performing groups, and gallery exhibitions in addition to hosting the annual Clifton Film Celebration. Smaller local art venues include the Alden Theater at the McLean Community Center, ArtSpace Herndon, Center Stage at the Reston Community Center, Greater Reston Arts Center, James Lee Community Center Theater, and Vienna Arts Society.

== Government and politics ==
Fairfax County uses the urban county executive form of government, which county voters approved in a 1966 referendum. Under the urban county executive plan, the county is governed by a 10-member Fairfax County Board of Supervisors with the day-to-day running of the county tasked to the appointed Fairfax County executive. Nine of the board members are elected from the single-member districts of Braddock, Dranesville, Franconia, Hunter Mill, Mason, Mount Vernon, Providence, Springfield, and Sully, while the chairman is elected at-large.

In addition to the board of supervisors, there are three constitutional officers, the commonwealth's attorney, clerk of the circuit court, and sheriff. The Fairfax County School Board has 13 members, which are directly elected by Fairfax County voters. Fairfax County also has a Consumer Protection Commission, which advises the board of supervisors and the Department of Cable and Consumer Services on consumer affairs, investigates illegal, fraudulent, deceptive, or dangerous consumer practices, and refers suspected violations of Virginia law to the commonwealth attorney or county attorney for investigation.

Fairfax County Government Center is west of the City of Fairfax in an unincorporated area. Fairfax County contains an exclave unincorporated area in the City of Fairfax's central business district, where many county facilities (including the courthouses and jail) are.

Fairfax County was once considered a Republican bastion, but Democrats now control the board of supervisors, school board (officially nonpartisan), offices of the county sheriff, and the commonwealth's attorney. Democrats also hold all the Fairfax seats in the Virginia House of Delegates and every seat in the Senate.

Fairfax County encompasses parts of three congressional districts, the 8th District, the 10th District, and the 11th District. Democrats represent all three districts, with Suhas Subramanyam representing the 10th, Don Beyer representing the 8th, and James Walkinshaw representing the 11th.

In the 2012 presidential election, Fairfax County solidly backed Barack Obama for re-election as president, who came just short of matching his 2008 performance in the county, winning it 59.6% to Mitt Romney's 39.1%. Former Virginia Governor Tim Kaine, running for the U.S. Senate in 2012, carried Fairfax County with 61% of the vote as part of his statewide victory. U.S. Representatives Connolly, Moran, and Wolf were also re-elected.

Republican governor Bob McDonnell won Fairfax County with 51% of the vote in 2009, but the Republican resurgence in Fairfax was short-lived. In the 2013 election, Democratic gubernatorial candidate Terry McAuliffe won Fairfax County with 58% of the vote, defeating incumbent state attorney general and former Republican state senator from Fairfax Ken Cuccinelli. McAuliffe's running mates, Ralph Northam and Mark Herring, also carried Fairfax County in their respective bids for lieutenant governor and attorney general. These Democratic victories mirrored the Democratic ticket's sweep of the state's three executive offices for the first time since 1989.

In the 2016 general election, Fairfax continued its trend towards Democratic candidates. Representatives Beyer and Connolly were re-elected, with Connolly running unopposed. Fairfax County supported Hillary Clinton for president with 64.4% of the vote to Donald Trump's 28.6%, exemplifying a heavy swing toward Democrats across Northern Virginia.

In the 2020 general election, Democratic presidential nominee Joe Biden won the county with 69.89% of the vote, the largest percentage for a Democrat in the county since 1916. As of 2025, Springfield supervisor Pat Herrity is the only elected Republican official in Fairfax County.

United States presidential election results for Fairfax County, Virginia
Year	Republican		Democratic		Third party(ies)	
Year	No.	%	No.	%	No.	%
1880	1,399	44.77%	1,726	55.23%	0	0.00%
1884	1,681	47.17%	1,883	52.83%	0	0.00%
1888	1,824	47.38%	2,010	52.21%	16	0.42%
1892	1,537	41.21%	2,168	58.12%	25	0.67%
1896	1,877	46.74%	2,109	52.51%	30	0.75%
1900	1,507	41.22%	2,135	58.40%	14	0.38%
1904	422	34.93%	774	64.07%	12	0.99%
1908	404	25.90%	1,143	73.27%	13	0.83%
1912	187	13.98%	992	74.14%	159	11.88%
1916	472	28.33%	1,179	70.77%	15	0.90%
1920	987	37.71%	1,598	61.06%	32	1.22%
1924	765	30.00%	1,586	62.20%	199	7.80%
1928	2,507	67.10%	1,229	32.90%	0	0.00%
1932	1,368	32.93%	2,714	65.33%	72	1.73%
1936	1,584	34.99%	2,913	64.35%	30	0.66%
1940	2,371	41.89%	3,263	57.65%	26	0.46%
1944	4,046	52.81%	3,582	46.75%	34	0.44%
1948	4,930	51.95%	3,719	39.19%	840	8.85%
1952	13,020	60.90%	8,329	38.96%	30	0.14%
1956	20,761	55.71%	15,633	41.95%	873	2.34%
1960	28,006	51.65%	26,064	48.07%	149	0.27%
1964	30,755	38.68%	48,680	61.22%	82	0.10%
1968	57,462	48.98%	44,796	38.18%	15,061	12.84%
1972	112,135	66.26%	54,844	32.40%	2,267	1.34%
1976	110,424	53.62%	92,037	44.69%	3,496	1.70%
1980	137,620	57.41%	73,734	30.76%	28,351	11.83%
1984	183,181	62.88%	107,295	36.83%	822	0.28%
1988	200,641	61.10%	125,711	38.28%	2,013	0.61%
1992	170,488	44.26%	160,186	41.58%	54,544	14.16%
1996	176,033	48.19%	170,150	46.58%	19,080	5.22%
2000	202,181	48.86%	196,501	47.49%	15,093	3.65%
2004	211,980	45.94%	245,671	53.25%	3,728	0.81%
2008	200,994	38.93%	310,359	60.12%	4,901	0.95%
2012	206,773	39.07%	315,273	59.57%	7,241	1.37%
2016	157,710	28.61%	355,133	64.43%	38,340	6.96%
2020	168,401	28.03%	419,943	69.89%	12,479	2.08%
2024	181,895	30.86%	386,438	65.56%	21,094	3.58%

County Board of Supervisors
Position	Name	Party	First election	District
Chairman	Jeff McKay	Democratic	2019	At-large
Supervisor	Rachna Sizemore Heizer	Democratic	2025	Braddock
Supervisor	Jimmy Bierman	Democratic	2023	Dranesville
Supervisor	Walter Alcorn	Democratic	2019	Hunter Mill
Supervisor	Rodney Lusk	Democratic	2019	Franconia
Supervisor	Andres Jimenez	Democratic	2023	Mason
Supervisor	Dan Storck	Democratic	2015	Mount Vernon
Supervisor	Dalia Palchik	Democratic	2019	Providence
Supervisor	Pat Herrity	Republican	2007	Springfield
Supervisor	Kathy Smith	Democratic	2015	Sully

Constitutional officers
Position	Name	Party	First election	District
Sheriff	Stacey Kincaid	Democratic	2013	At-large
Commonwealth's Attorney	Steve Descano	Democratic	2019	At-large
Clerk of Circuit Court	Christopher Falcon	Democratic	2023	At-large

Delegates
Position	Name	Party	First election	District
Delegate	Charniele Herring	Democratic	2009	4
Delegate	Rip Sullivan	Democratic	2014	6
Delegate	Karen Keys-Gamarra	Democratic	2023	7
Delegate	Irene Shin	Democratic	2021	8
Delegate	Karrie Delaney	Democratic	2017	9
Delegate	Dan Helmer	Democratic	2019	10
Delegate	Gretchen Bulova	Democratic	2026	11
Delegate	Holly Seibold	Democratic	2023	12
Delegate	Marcus Simon	Democratic	2013	13
Delegate	Vivian Watts	Democratic	1995	14
Delegate	Laura Jane Cohen	Democratic	2023	15
Delegate	Paul Krizek	Democratic	2015	16
Delegate	Garrett McGuire	Democratic	2026	17
Delegate	Kathy Tran	Democratic	2017	18
Delegate	Rozia Henson	Democratic	2023	19

Senators
Position	Name	Party	First election	District
Senator	Jennifer Carroll Foy	Democratic	2023	33
Senator	Scott Surovell	Democratic	2015	34
Senator	Dave Marsden	Democratic	2010	35
Senator	Stella Pekarsky	Democratic	2023	36
Senator	Saddam Azlan Salim	Democratic	2023	37
Senator	Jennifer Boysko	Democratic	2019	38
Senator	Elizabeth Bennett-Parker	Democratic	2026	39

Consumer Protection Commission
Position	Name
Commissioner	Harold G. Belkowitz, Esq.
Commissioner	Chester J. Freedenthal
Vice Chairperson	Denis Gulakowski
Commissioner	Dirck A. Hargraves
Commissioner	Pratik J. Kharat
Commissioner	Dennis Dean Kirk, Esq.
Chairperson	Jason J. Kratovil
Commissioner	Triston "Chase" O'Savio
Commissioner	Michael J. Roark
Secretary	Jacqueline G. Rosier
Commissioner	Maurice B. Springer
Commissioner	Paul Svab

== Transportation ==
=== Roads ===
Several major highways run through Fairfax County, including the Capital Beltway (Interstate 495), Interstate 66, Interstate 95, and Interstate 395. The American Legion Bridge connects Fairfax to Montgomery County, Maryland. The George Washington Memorial Parkway, Dulles Toll Road, and Fairfax County Parkway are also major arteries. Other notable roads include Braddock Road, Old Keene Mill Road, Little River Turnpike, State Routes 7, 28, and 123, and U.S. Routes 1, 29, and 50.

The county is part of the Washington metropolitan area, the nation's third-most congested area as of 2008.

Northern Virginia, including Fairfax County, is the third-worst congested traffic area in the nation, in terms of percentage of congested roadways and time spent in traffic. Of the lane miles in the region, 44 percent are rated "F", or worst, for congestion. Northern Virginia residents spend an average of 46 hours a year stuck in traffic.

=== Major highways ===
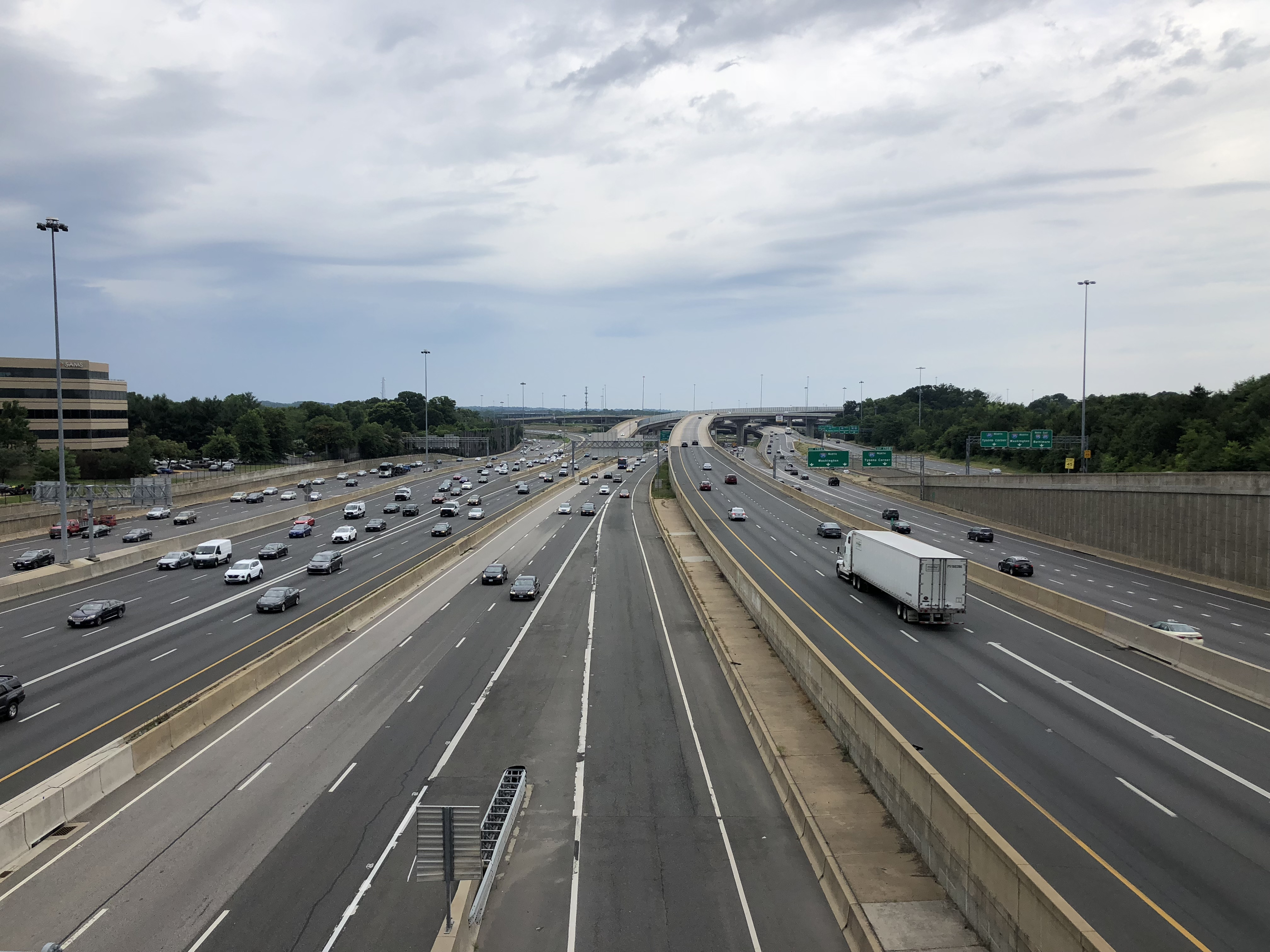
I-95 in Fairfax County

- Interstate 66
- Interstate 95
- Interstate 395
- Interstate 495 (Capital Beltway)
- U.S. Route 1
- U.S. Route 29
- U.S. Route 50
- State Route 7
- State Route 28
- State Route 123
- State Route 193
- State Route 236
- State Route 237
- State Route 243
- State Route 267 (Dulles Toll Road)
- State Route 286 and State Route 289 (Fairfax County and Franconia-Springfield Parkways)
- George Washington Memorial Parkway

=== Air ===
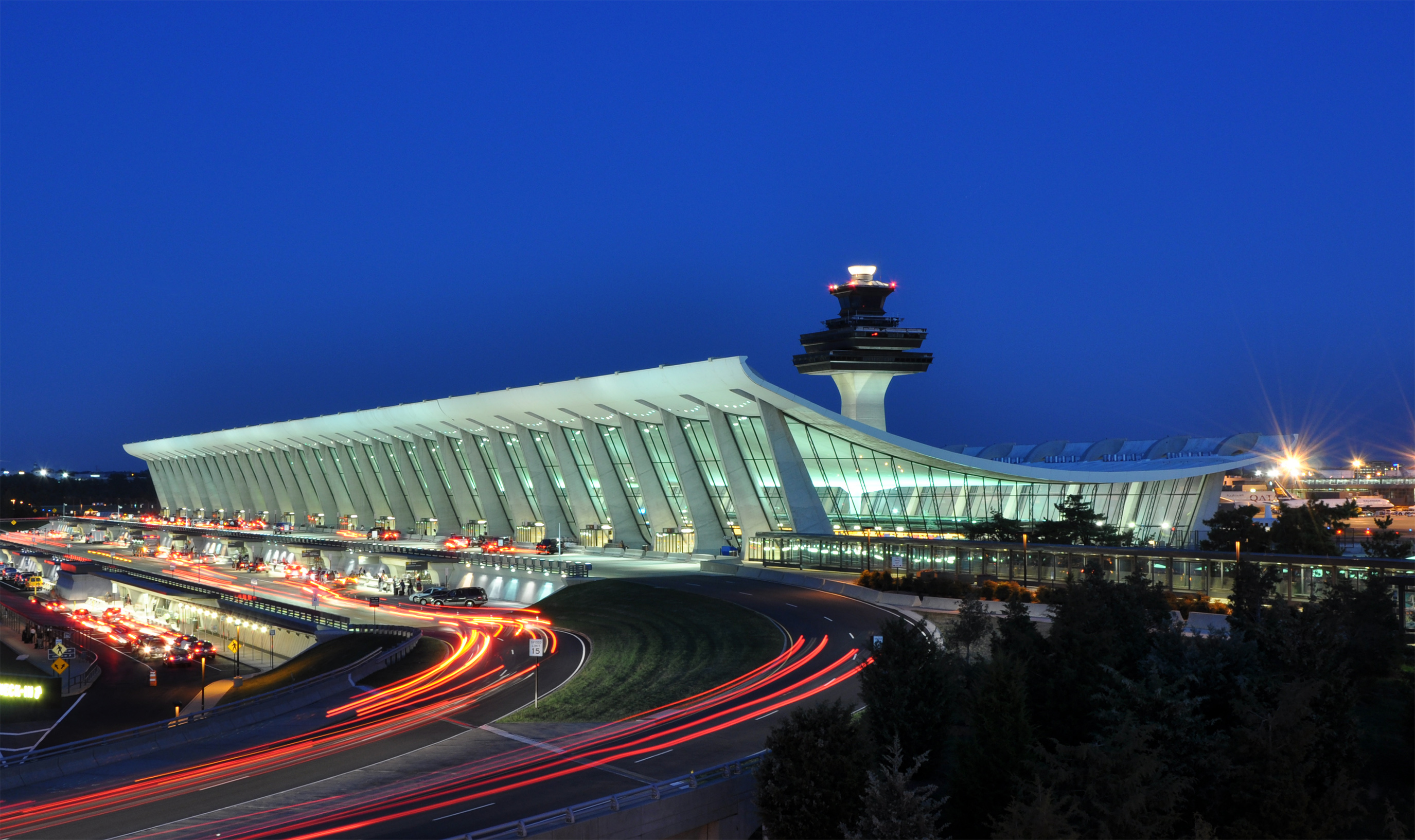
Dulles International Airport, partially located in Fairfax County

Dulles International Airport lies partly within Fairfax County and provides most air service to the county. Fairfax is also served by two other airports in the Washington area, Ronald Reagan Washington National Airport and Baltimore-Washington International Thurgood Marshall Airport. Manassas Regional Airport, in neighboring Prince William County, is also used for regional cargo and private jet service.

From 1945 to 1961, the eastern part of Fairfax County hosted Falls Church Airpark, an airfield primarily used for general aviation and civil defense purposes until encroaching residential development forced its closure. The area the airport occupied is now mainly used as a shopping center, with the western end of the complex occupied by the Thomas Jefferson branch of the Fairfax County Public Library system. Parts of several apartment complexes are also on some of the airport's former grounds.

=== Public transportation ===
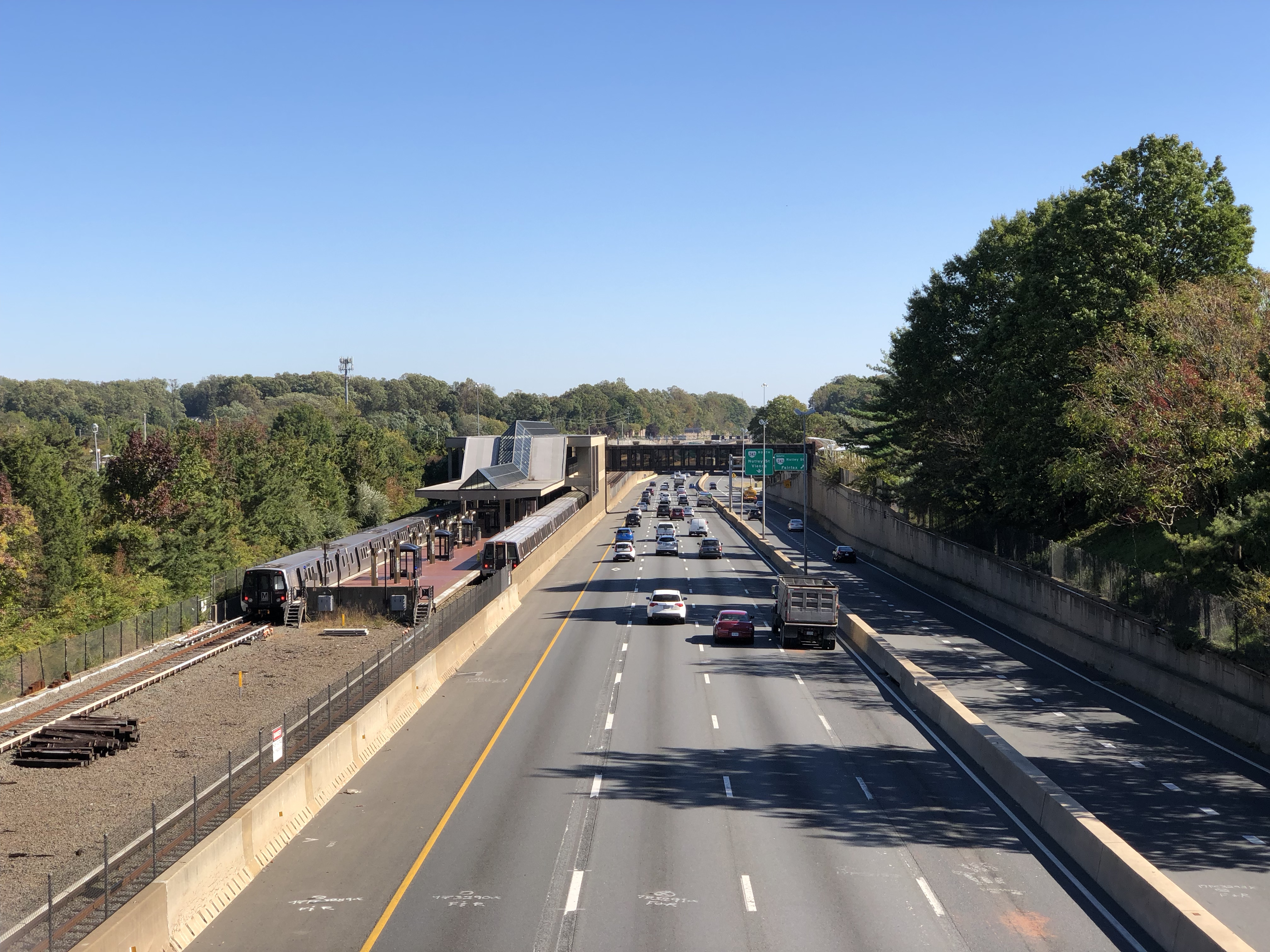
Vienna station, the western terminus of the Orange Line of the Washington Metro rapid rail system

Fairfax County has multiple public transportation services, including the Washington Metro's Blue, Orange, Silver and Yellow lines. The Silver line, which runs through the Tysons, Reston, and Herndon areas of the county, opened in 2014, later extended in 2022, as the first new Washington Metro line since the Green Line opened in 1991.

The Virginia Railway Express (VRE) provides commuter rail service to Union Station in Washington, D.C., with stations in Fairfax County. The VRE's Fairfax County stations are Lorton and Franconia-Springfield on the Fredericksburg line, and Burke Centre, Rolling Road, and Backlick Road on the Manassas line.

Fairfax County contracts its bus service, the Fairfax Connector, to Transdev. The City of Fairfax's CUE Bus also serves parts of the county, namely George Mason University and Vienna/Fairfax-GMU Station on the Orange line. The county is also served by WMATA's Metrobus service.

== Parks and recreation ==
The county has many protected areas, a total of over 390 county parks on more than 23,000 acres (93 km^{2}). The Fairfax County Park Authority maintains parks and recreation centers through the county. There are also two national protected areas that are inside the county at least in part, including Elizabeth Hartwell Mason Neck National Wildlife Refuge, George Washington Memorial Parkway, and Wolf Trap National Park for the Performing Arts. Mason Neck State Park is also in Lorton.

Fairfax County is a member of the Northern Virginia Regional Park Authority.

Reston Zoo is in Reston. The National Zoo is nearby in Washington, D.C.

=== Trails ===
The county maintains many miles of bike trails running through parks, adjacent to roads and through towns such as Vienna and Herndon. The Washington & Old Dominion Railroad Trail runs through Fairfax County, offering one of the region's best, and safest, routes for recreational walking and biking. In addition, nine miles (14 km) of the Mount Vernon Trail runs through Fairfax County along the Potomac River.

Compared to other regions of the Washington area, Fairfax County has a dearth of designated bike lanes for cyclists wishing to commute in the region. On May 16, 2008, Bike-to-Work Day, the Fairfax County Department of Transportation released the first countywide bicycle route map.

The Gerry Connolly Cross County Trail runs from Great Falls National Park in the county's northern end to Occoquan Regional Park in the southern end. Consisting of mostly dirt paths and short asphalt sections, the trail is used mostly by recreational mountain bikers, hikers, and horse riders.

== Communities ==
Map of Fairfax County's towns and CDPs

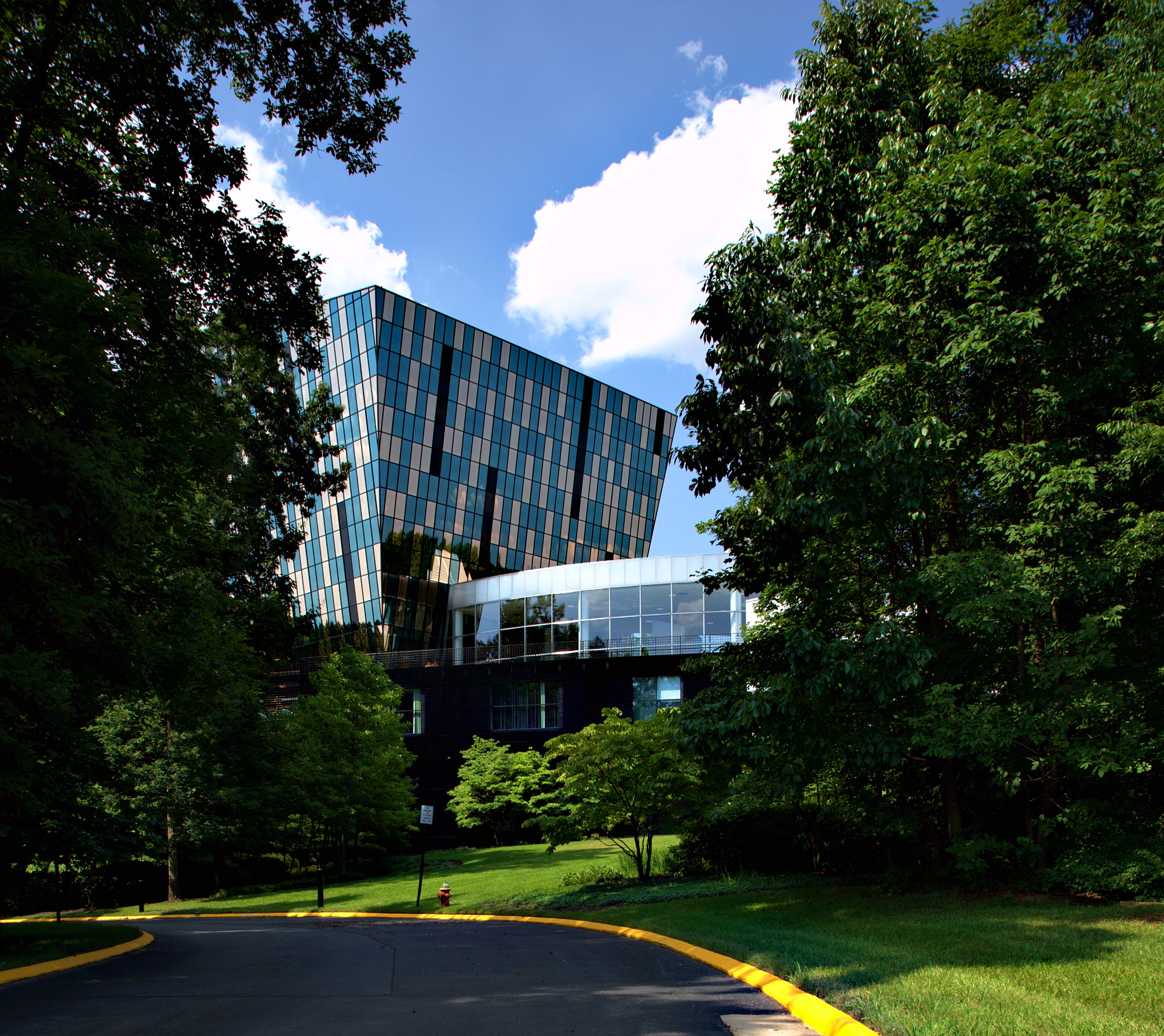
Herndon

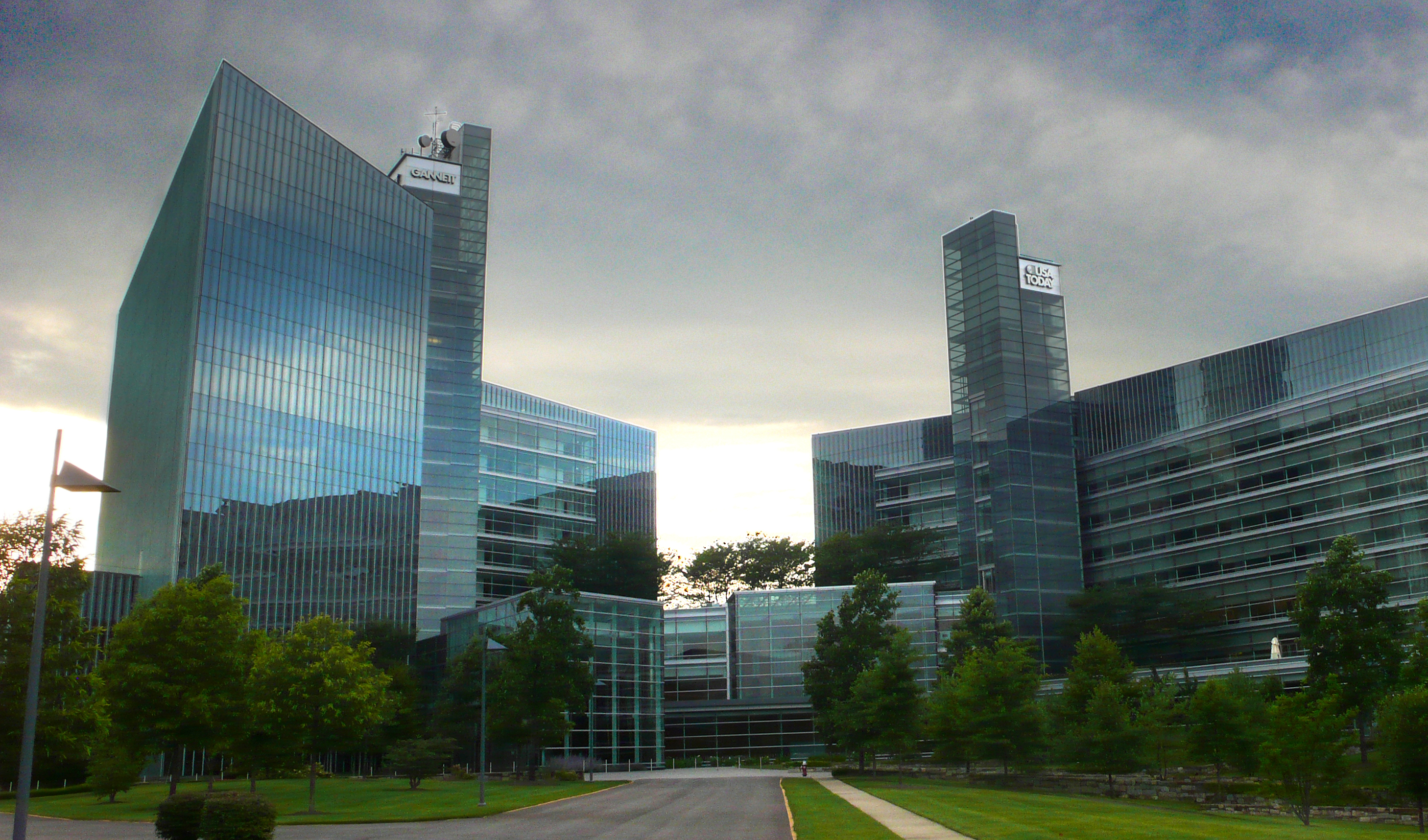
McLean

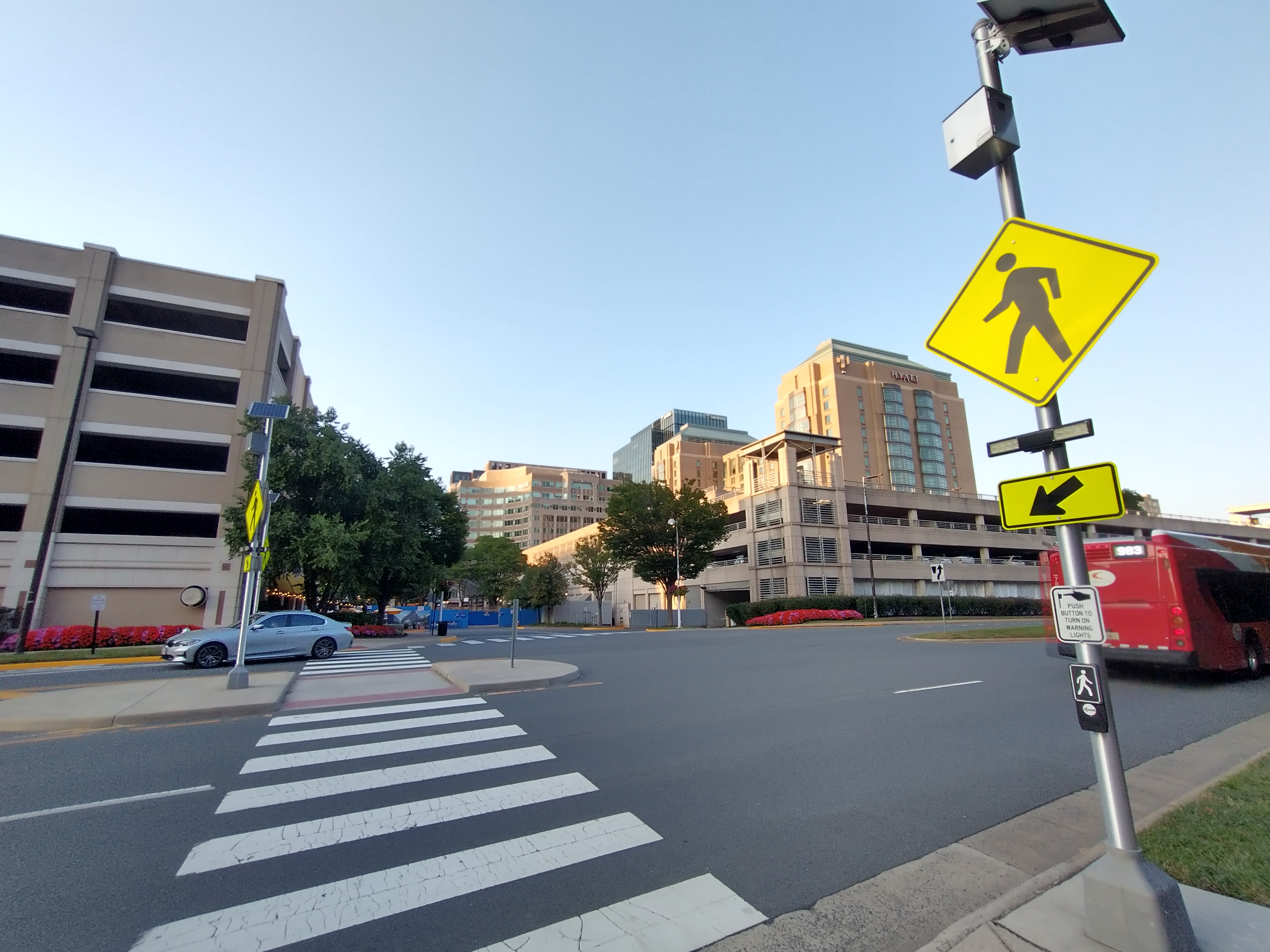
Reston

Three incorporated towns, Clifton, Herndon, and Vienna, are in Fairfax County.

The independent cities of Falls Church and Fairfax were formed out of areas formerly under Fairfax County's jurisdiction but are politically separate. Nevertheless, the Postal Service has long considered several portions of Fairfax County to be unincorporated Falls Church and Fairfax City. Several portions of the county also have Alexandria mailing addresses; many locals refer to these neighborhoods collectively as "South Alexandria", "Lower Alexandria", or "Alexandria, Fairfax County". "South Alexandria" communities include Hollin Hills, Franconia, Groveton, Hybla Valley, Huntington, Belle Haven, Mount Vernon, Fort Hunt, Engleside, Burgundy Village, Waynewood, Wilton Woods, Rose Hill, Virginia Hills, Hayfield, and Kingstowne.

It has been proposed to convert the entire county into a single independent city, primarily to gain more control over taxes and roads. The most recent such proposal was made on June 30, 2009.

Other communities in Fairfax County are unincorporated areas. Virginia law dictates that no unincorporated area of a county may be incorporated as a separate town or city following the adoption of the urban county executive form of government. Fairfax County adopted the urban county executive form of government in 1966.

As of the 2000 census, Fairfax County's 13 largest communities are all unincorporated CDPs, the largest of which are Centreville, Reston, and McLean, each with a population over 45,000.

=== Census-designated places ===
The following localities in Fairfax County are identified by the U.S. Census Bureau as unincorporated census-designated places:

- Annandale
- Bailey's Crossroads
- Belle Haven
- Braddock
- Bull Run
- Burke
- Burke Centre
- Centreville
- Chantilly
- Crosspointe
- Difficult Run
- Dranesville
- Dunn Loring
- Fair Lakes
- Fair Oaks
- Fairfax Station
- Floris
- Fort Belvoir
- Fort Hunt
- Franconia
- Franklin Farm
- George Mason
- Great Falls
- Great Falls Crossing
- Greenbriar
- Groveton
- Hayfield
- Huntington
- Hutchison
- Hybla Valley
- Idylwood
- Kings Park
- Kings Park West
- Kingstowne
- Lake Barcroft
- Laurel Hill
- Lincolnia
- Long Branch
- Lorton
- Mantua
- Mason Neck
- McLean
- McNair
- Merrifield
- Mount Vernon
- Navy
- Newington
- Newington Forest
- North Springfield
- Oakton
- Pimmit Hills
- Ravensworth
- Reston
- Rose Hill
- Seven Corners
- South Run
- Springfield
- Sully Square
- Tysons
- Union Mill
- Wakefield
- West Falls Church
- West Springfield
- Wolf Trap
- Woodburn
- Woodlawn

=== Other unincorporated communities ===
- Accotink
- Arcturus
- Barkers Crossroads
- Blevinstown
- Colchester
- Cooktown
- Crowells Corner
- Culmore
- Donovans Corner
- Doveville
- Farrs Corner
- Five Forks
- Four Corners
- Hattontown
- Hollin Hills
- Hollindale
- Jermantown
- Langley
- Lees Corner
- Lewinsville
- Lewis Park
- Makleys Corner
- Matildaville
- New Alexandria
- Oak Hill
- Odricks Corner
- Pohick
- Schneider Crossroads
- Shady Oak
- Strathmeade Springs
- Sunset Hills
- Uniontown
- Virginia Hills

=== Population ranking ===
The population ranking of the following table is based on 2020 U.S. census data.

† county seat

Rank	City/town/etc.	Municipal type	Population (2020)
1	Centreville	CDP	73,518
2	Reston	CDP	63,226
3	McLean	CDP	50,773
4	Annandale	CDP	43,363
5	Burke	CDP	42,312
6	Oakton	CDP	36,732
7	Fair Oaks	CDP	34,052
8	Springfield	CDP	31,339
9	West Falls Church	CDP	30,243
10	Bailey's Crossroads	CDP	24,749
11	Herndon	Town	24,655
12	West Springfield	CDP	24,369
13	Chantilly	CDP	24,301
14	Tysons	CDP	24,261
15	† Fairfax	City	24,146
16	Lincolnia	CDP	22,922
17	McNair	CDP	21,598
18	Rose Hill	CDP	21,045
19	Merrifield	CDP	20,488
20	Lorton	CDP	20,072
21	Woodlawn	CDP	20,859
22	Franklin Farm	CDP	19,189
23	Franconia	CDP	18,943
24	Idylwood	CDP	17,954
25	Fort Hunt	CDP	17,231
26	Kingstowne	CDP	16,825
27	Wolf Trap	CDP	16,496
28	Vienna	Town	16,473
29	Hybla Valley	CDP	16,319
30	Great Falls	CDP	15,953
31	Groveton	CDP	15,725
32	Huntington	CDP	13,749
33	Kings Park West	CDP	13,465
34	Newington	CDP	13,223
35	Newington Forest	CDP	12,957
36	Mount Vernon	CDP	12,914
37	Fairfax Station	CDP	12,420
38	Wakefield	CDP	11,805
39	Dranesville	CDP	11,785
40	George Mason	CDP	11,162
41	Difficult Run	CDP	10,600
42	Lake Barcroft	CDP	9,770
43	Dunn Loring	CDP	9,464
44	Seven Corners	CDP	9,131
45	Woodburn	CDP	8,797
46	Greenbriar	CDP	8,421
47	Fair Lakes	CDP	8,404
48	Floris	CDP	8,341
49	Laurel Hill	CDP	8,307
50	Long Branch	CDP	7,890
51	Fort Belvoir	CDP	7,637
52	Mantua	CDP	7,503
53	North Springfield	CDP	7,430
54	Bull Run	CDP	6,972
55	Belle Haven	CDP	6,851
56	Pimmit Hills	CDP	6,569
57	Braddock	CDP	6,549
58	South Run	CDP	6,462
59	Hutchison	CDP	6,231
60	Crosspointe	CDP	5,722
61	Union Mill	CDP	4,997
62	Kings Park	CDP	4,537
63	Navy	CDP	4,327
64	Hayfield	CDP	4,154
65	Ravensworth	CDP	2,680
66	Sully Square	CDP	2,300
67	Mason Neck	CDP	2,025
68	Great Falls Crossing	CDP	1,392
69	Clifton	Town	243

== Notable people ==
=== Historic figures ===
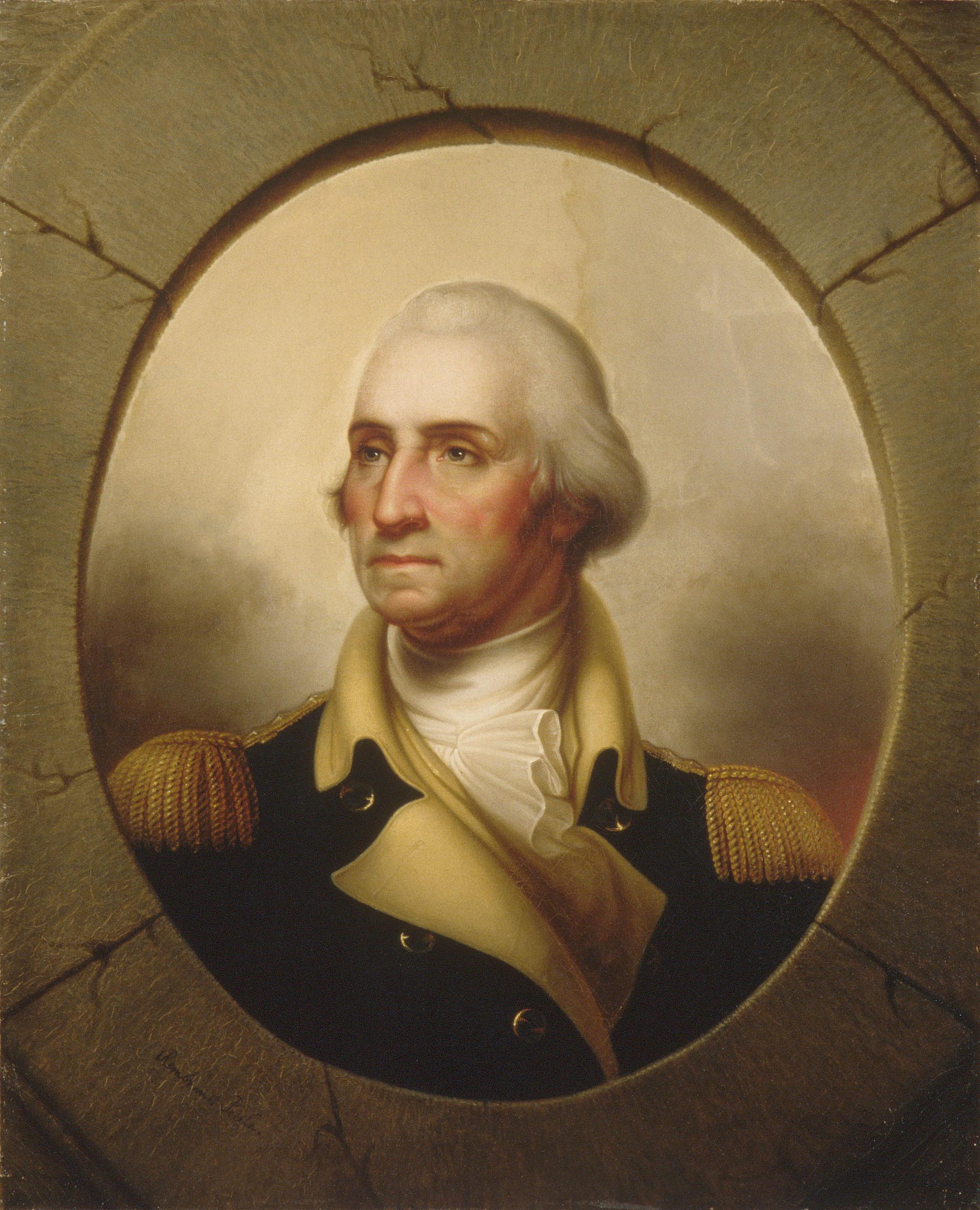
George Washington, the victorious commander of the Continental Army during the Revolutionary War and nation's first president, whose residence, Mount Vernon, is in Fairfax County

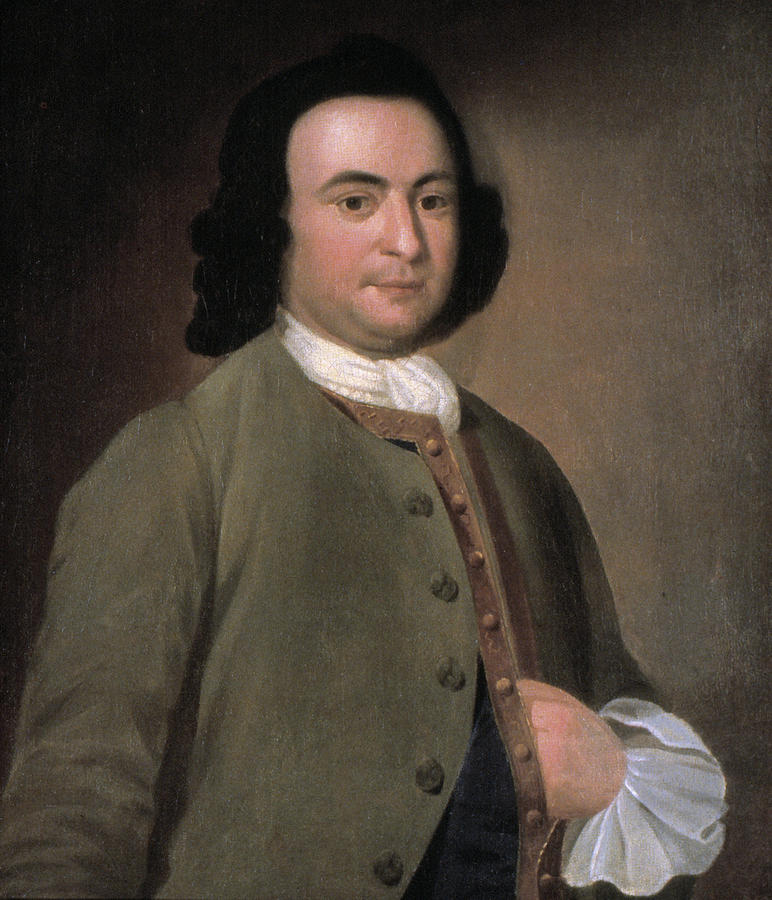
George Mason, whose residence, Gunston Hall, is in Fairfax County.

- John Wynn Davidson, Union Army general who co-led the Bloody Island massacre in 1850
- Fitzhugh Lee (from Clermont), Confederate general and governor of Virginia
- Richard Bland Lee (from Sully Plantation), U.S. congressman from 1789 to 1795
- George Mason (from Gunston Hall), Founding Father considered the "father of the United States Bill of Rights"
- George Washington (from Mount Vernon), commander-in-chief of the Continental Army and first president of the United States

=== Films and television ===
- Nguyễn Cao Kỳ Duyên, co-host, Paris By Night
- Christina Hendricks, actress, Mad Men and Firefly
- Julianne Moore, Oscar-winning actress
- Park Yoo-chun, singer, TVXQ and JYJ
- Prince Poppycock, America's Got Talent Season Five fourth place finalist
- Jason Sudeikis, actor and writer, Saturday Night Live
- tobyMac, Grammy-winning artist, producer, and songwriter
- Jimmy Workman, actor, The Addams Family and Addams Family Values

=== Government and politics ===
- Sharon Bulova, former chairwoman, board of supervisors
- Barbara Comstock, former U.S. congresswoman (VA-10) and former Virginia delegate (R-34)
- Gerry Connolly, former U.S. congressman (VA-11) and former chairman of the Fairfax County board of supervisors
- Tom Davis, former U.S. congressman (VA-11)
- James Gattuso, senior research fellow, The Heritage Foundation, and former associate director to U.S. Vice President Dan Quayle
- Katherine Hanley, Virginia secretary of the Commonwealth and former county board chair
- Nguyễn Cao Kỳ, South Vietnamese prime minister, vice president, and Air Force general
- John Warner, former U.S. senator
- Jim Webb, former U.S. senator

=== Media ===
- Jayson Blair, former New York Times reporter who fabricated stories
- Steve Scully, former host, political editor, and senior producer of C-SPAN's Washington Journal

=== Music, television, and film ===
- The Dismemberment Plan, band led by Travis Morrison
- Lauren Graham, actress, Gilmore Girls
- Dave Grohl, drummer, Nirvana, and front man for Foo Fighters
- J, K-pop R&B, and soul musician
- John Jackson, blues guitarist, master of Piedmont blues

=== Sportspeople ===
- Bruce Arena, head coach, United States men's national soccer team
- Eric Barton, former NFL linebacker
- Brian Carroll, midfielder, Philadelphia Union
- Hubert Davis, former professional basketball player
- Mike Glennon, professional football quarterback, Jacksonville Jaguars
- Mia Hamm, U.S. Olympic and professional soccer player
- Andy Heck, former NFL football player
- Grant Hill, former NBA player
- Allen Johnson, 110m hurdles U.S. Olympic gold medalist
- Bhawoh Jue, professional football player, Green Bay Packers
- Brian Kendrick, professional wrestler
- Javier López, former professional baseball pitcher, Arizona Diamondbacks, Boston Red Sox, Colorado Rockies, Pittsburgh Pirates, and the San Francisco Giants and four-time World Series champion
- Keith Allen Lyle, former professional football player, Los Angeles/St Louis Rams
- Ilia Malinin, U.S. Olympic figure skater
- Michael McCrary, former defensive end
- Ed Moses, U.S. Olympic swimmer
- Scott Norwood, former professional football kicker, Buffalo Bills
- Alex Riley, professional wrestler
- Eddie Royal, professional football wide receiver, Chicago Bears
- Evan Royster, free agent NFL running back
- Joe Saunders, professional baseball pitcher, Seattle Mariners
- Justin Spring, U.S. Olympic gymnast
- Chris Warren, former NFL running back
- Alan Webb, U.S. Olympic track runner and American record holder in the Mile run
- Michael Weiss, figure skater
- Kate Ziegler, U.S. Olympic swimmer

=== Other ===
- Todd Boehly, businessman and investor
- Seung-hui Cho, shooter who perpetrated the Virginia Tech shooting
- Catherine Coleman, astronaut
- Robert Hanssen, spy who sold secrets to the Soviet Union and Russia
- Kjell Lindgren, astronaut
- Christopher McCandless, wanderer who went to Alaska to try to "find himself" and died in the process, inspiring the non-fiction book Into the Wild
- Lorenzo Odone, ALD patient who inspired the film Lorenzo's Oil
- Sean Parker, co-founder of Napster, Plaxo, and Causes

== Sister cities ==
Fairfax County's sister cities are:

- Songpa (Seoul), South Korea (2009)
- Harbin, China (2009)
- Keçiören (Ankara), Turkey (2012)

== See also ==
- Fairfax County Chamber of Commerce
- Fairfax County Economic Development Authority
- Fairfax County Fire and Rescue Department
- Fairfax County Police Department
- Fairfax County Sheriff's Office
- List of companies headquartered in Northern Virginia
- List of federal agencies in Northern Virginia
- National Register of Historic Places listings in Fairfax County, Virginia
