= Shady Oak, Virginia =

Unincorporated community in Virginia, United States

- Unincorporated community
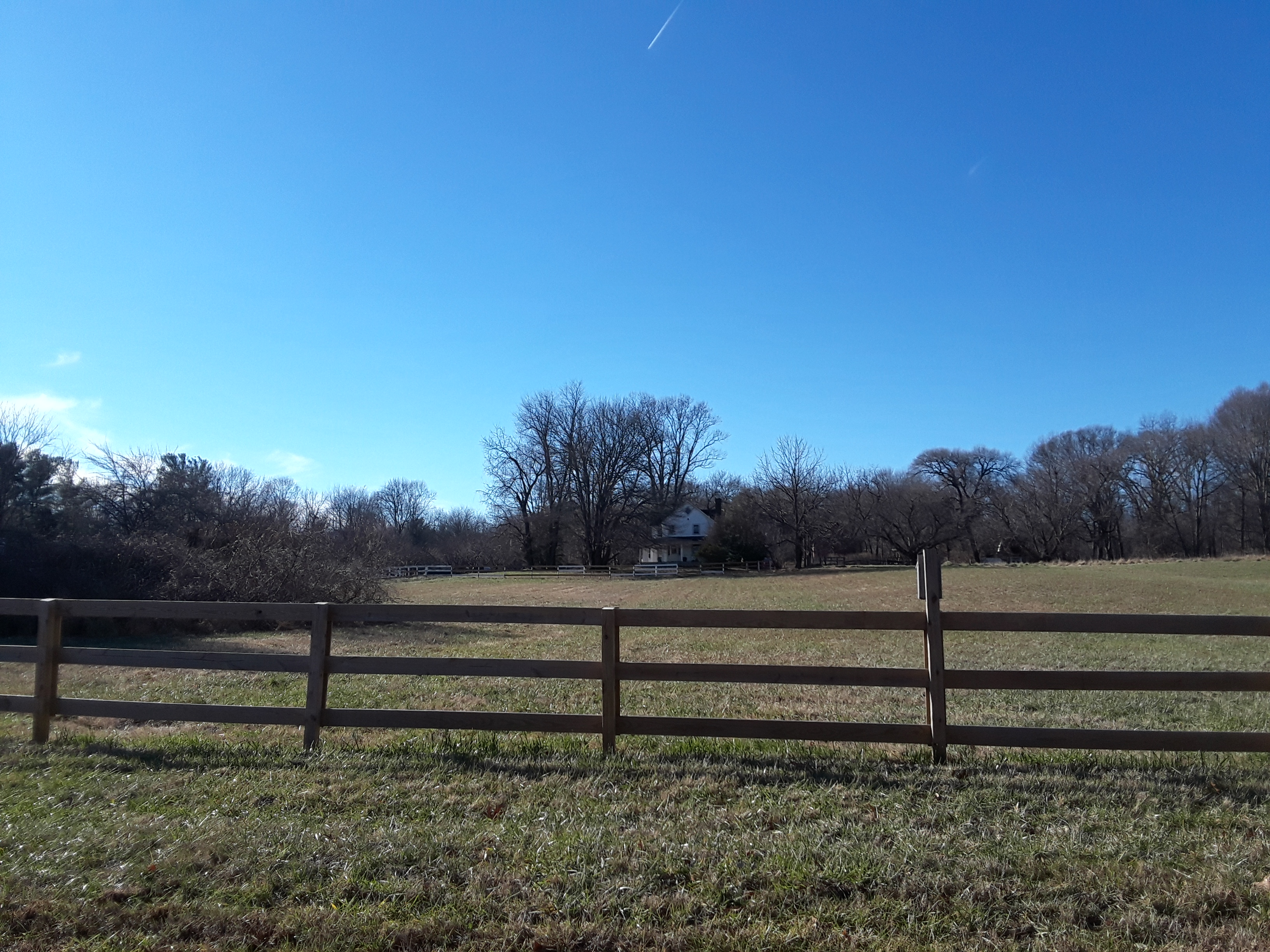
- House in Shady Oak, December 2018

- Location within Northern Virginia Location within Virginia Location within the United States
- Coordinates: 39°1′39″N 77°17′39″W
- Country: United States
- State: Virginia
- County: Fairfax
- Time zone: UTC−5 (Eastern (EST))
  - Summer (DST): UTC−4 (EDT)
- GNIS feature ID: 1474208

Shady Oak is an unincorporated community in northern Fairfax County, Virginia, United States. Shady Oak is primarily a residential community on the Potomac River.
