= Great Falls Crossing, Virginia =

Great Falls Crossing
- Census-designated place
- Location within the state of Virginia Great Falls Crossing (the United States)
- Coordinates: 38.981°N 77.326°W
- Country: United States of America
- State: Virginia
- County: Fairfax

Area
  - Total: 0.60 sq mi (1.55 km^{2})
  - Land: 0.59 sq mi (1.54 km^{2})
  - Water: 0.0039 sq mi (0.01 km^{2})

Population (2020)
  - Total: 1,392
  - Density: 2,340/sq mi (904/km^{2})
- Time zone: UTC-5 (Eastern (EST))
  - Summer (DST): UTC-4 (EDT)

Great Falls Crossing is a census designated place in Fairfax County, Virginia, United States. The population at the 2020 census was 1,392. Established after the 2020 Census, it includes previously unincorporated areas with Reston addresses between the communities of Reston and Great Falls.

== Demographics ==
Great Falls Crossing first appeared as a census designated place in the 2020 U.S. census.

=== 2020 census ===
Great Falls Crossing CDP, Virginia – Racial and ethnic composition Note: the US Census treats Hispanic/Latino as an ethnic category. This table excludes Latinos from the racial categories and assigns them to a separate category. Hispanics/Latinos may be of any race.
Race / Ethnicity (NH = Non-Hispanic)	Pop 2020	2020
White alone (NH)	794	57.04%
Black or African American alone (NH)	55	3.95%
Native American or Alaska Native alone (NH)	1	0.07%
Asian alone (NH)	322	23.13%
Native Hawaiian or Pacific Islander alone (NH)	2	0.14%
Other race alone (NH)	12	0.86%
Mixed race or Multiracial (NH)	111	7.97%
Hispanic or Latino (any race)	95	6.82%
Total	1,392	100.00%

This section includes some information from the 2022 American Community Survey

At the 2020 census there were 1,392 people, 422 housing units and 540 households residing in the CDP. The racial makeup of the CDP was 58.26% White, 4.02% African American, 0.07% Native American, 23.13% Asian, 0.14% Pacific Islander, 2.44% from other races, and 11.93% from two or more races. Hispanic or Latino of any race was 6.82% of the population.

Of the households, 23.2% were non-family households, 57.2% were married couple families, 9.4% were a male family householder with no spouse, and 10.2% were a female family householder with no spouse. The average family household had 3.06 people.

The median age was 51.5, 21.1% of people were under the age of 18, and 6.1% were 65 years of age or older. The largest ancestry is the 10.9% who had Irish ancestry, 26.4% spoke a language other than English at home, and 17.7% were born outside the United States, 94.2% of whom were naturalized citizens.

The median income for a household in the CDP was over $250,000. 3.3% of the population were military veterans, and 87.9% had a batchelor's degree or higher. In the CDP 8.2% of the population was below the poverty line, including 20.4% of those under the age of 18 and 29.2% of those aged 65 or over, with 0.4% of the population without health insurance.
