= Blevinstown, Virginia =

Unincorporated community in Virginia, United States

- Unincorporated community
- Location within Northern Virginia Location within Virginia Location within the United States
- Coordinates: 38°49′34″N 77°22′14″W
- Country: United States
- State: Virginia
- County: Fairfax
- Time zone: UTC−5 (Eastern (EST))
  - Summer (DST): UTC−4 (EDT)
- GNIS feature ID: 1494183

Blevinstown is an unincorporated community on Braddock Road in Fairfax County, Virginia, United States.
