= Odricks Corner, Virginia =

Unincorporated community in Virginia, United States

- Unincorporated community
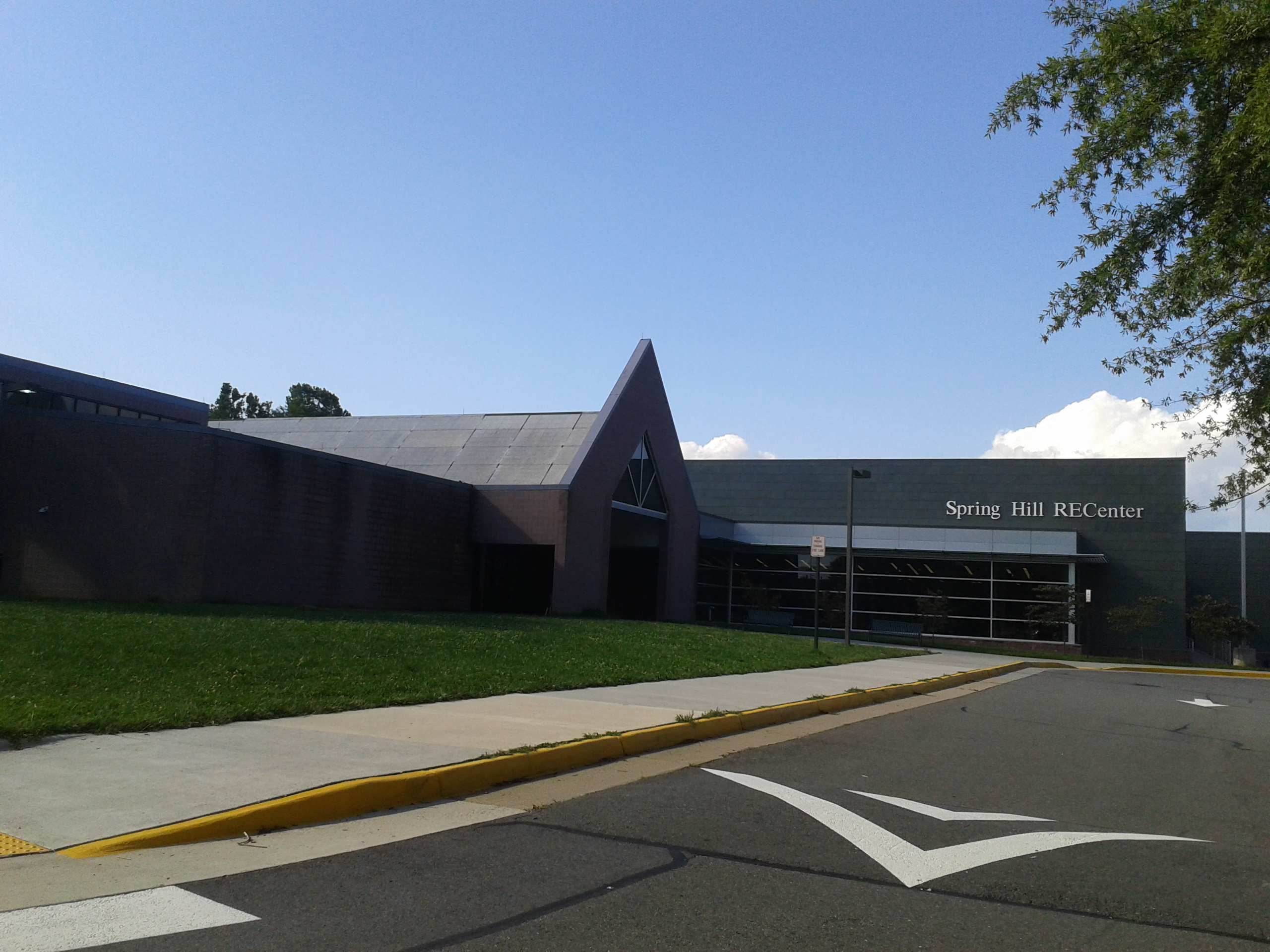
- Spring Hill Recreation Center, in the approximate location of the former community of Odricks Corner, in August 2017

- Location within Northern Virginia Location within Virginia Location within the United States
- Coordinates: 38°56′19″N 77°13′53″W
- Country: United States
- State: Virginia
- County: Fairfax
- Time zone: UTC−5 (Eastern (EST))
  - Summer (DST): UTC−4 (EDT)
- GNIS feature ID: 1496042

Odricks Corner is an unincorporated community in Fairfax County, Virginia, United States. Odricks Corner lies north of the Dulles Toll Road (State Route 267) at the intersection of Spring Hill and Lewinsville Roads.

Odricks Corner takes its name from Alfred Odrick, a former slave and carpenter who in 1872 purchased 30 acres and built a house on the southern side of Lewinsville Road. This was later intersected by Spring Hill Road, and the resulting location came to be known as Odrick's Corner. By 1879 a one-room schoolhouse, called Odrick's School, had been erected at the corner; tradition links Alfred Odrick to its creation. The school came to be used as well as a location for community meetings, and was the first place where services for Shiloh Baptist Church were held. The original frame building, which came to be the center of a thriving African-American community, was eventually replaced with a brick structure. This was later closed, and was sold in 1953; it has since been demolished.

The history of the community has been noted by a historic marker near the Spring Hill Recreation Center, erected by the Fairfax County History Commission in 2002.
