= Fairfax County Economic Development Authority =

Coordinates: 38.90111°N 77.26556°W

The Fairfax County Economic Development Authority (FCEDA) is an independent authority in Fairfax County, Virginia, created under Virginia state law in 1964 and funded by Fairfax County government.

FCEDA exists to promote investment and business growth in Fairfax County in order to expand the commercial tax base that helps pay for public services such as the county school system, police and fire departments, parks, libraries and social services. The FCEDA does this by managing marketing programs that encourage businesses to expand or relocate to the county. It is the largest non-state economic development authority in the nation. Since its founding in 1964, the Fairfax County Economic Development Authority has worked with more than 3,500 companies that added more than 230,000 jobs and leased more 71 million square feet of office space in Fairfax County.

== History ==
=== 20th century ===
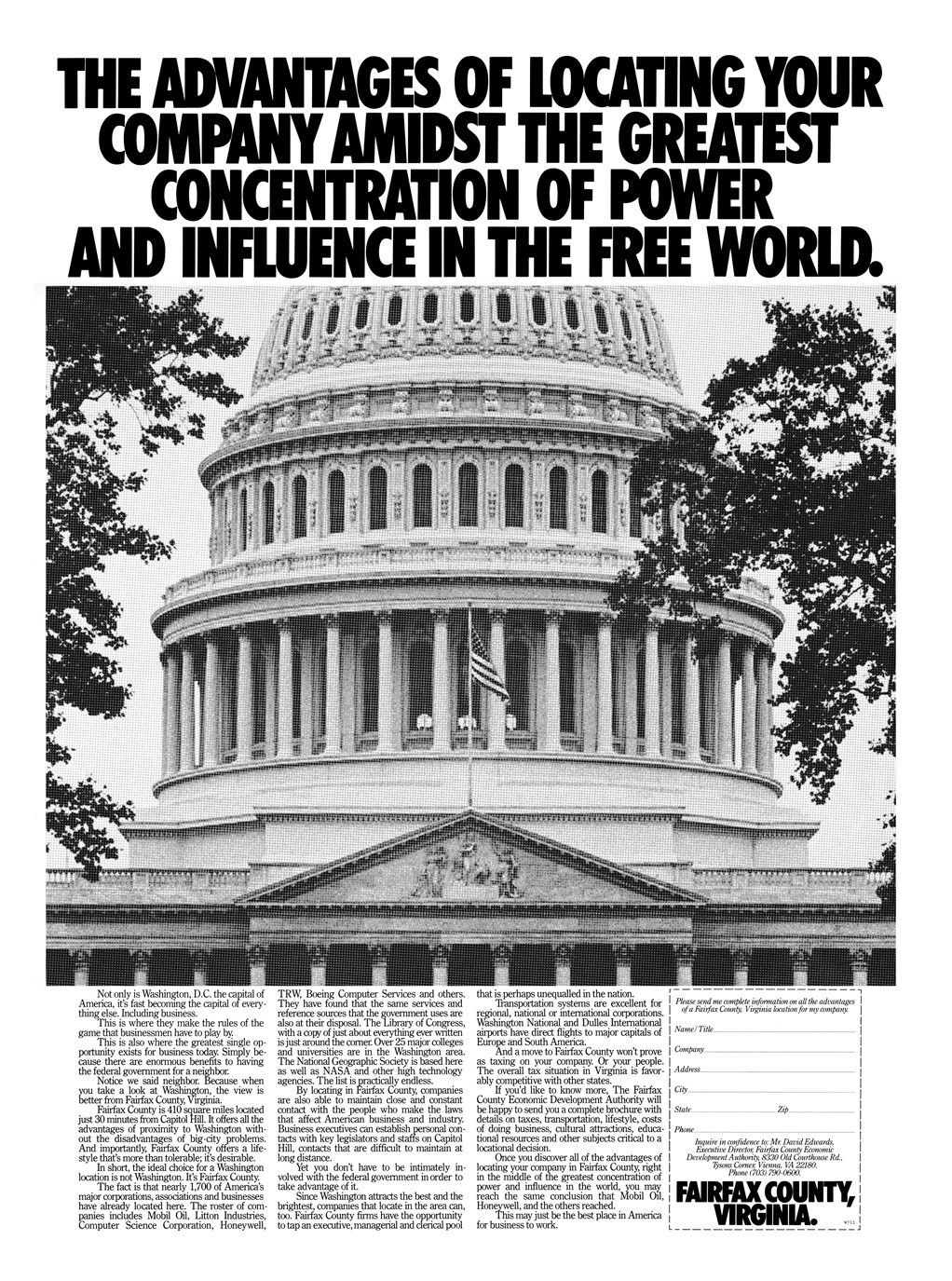
An advertisement for Fairfax County, which ran in The Wall Street Journal

In 1956, the Fairfax County Board of Supervisors formed an advisory group on economic development called the Industrial Development Commission.

This group existed until 1964 when the Virginia General Assembly acted to create the Fairfax County Industrial Development Authority. The legislature changed the name to the Economic Development Authority in 1973. Acting on concerns about population increases and funding of county services, the Board of Supervisors in the late 1970s tasked the FCEDA with its mission to create a business retention and attraction campaign that formed the basis of the EDA's current programs and purpose.

In 1976, the newly elected chairman of the Fairfax County Board of Supervisors, Jack Herrity, commissioned a blue ribbon panel for the purpose of examining the county's existing ordinances and policies related to industrial development and growth. The panel, named for its chairman, Noman Cole, produced a report entitled the "Committee to Study the Means of Encouraging Industrial Development in Fairfax County".

The Board of Supervisors charged the Economic Development Authority with developing a business attraction and retention program. Earle Williams, one of the contributors to the report, joined FCEDA around this time and argued for a large increase in the authority's marketing budget. As part of the marketing strategy, the authority bought a two-page ad in The Wall Street Journal, the cost of which was beyond anything that group had ever done. These early forays into advertising were preludes to what became a robust global advertising effort that promoted Fairfax County as a brand.

=== 21st century ===
In 2007, the combined impact of pro-growth policies and the attraction and retention campaign, led Time magazine columnist Justin Fox to call Fairfax County "one of the great economic success stories of our time".

Also in 2007, a study called the Long Island Index compared the satisfaction of residents of Long Island and northern Virginia around subjects including local taxes and public services. The survey found that 89 percent of Fairfax County residents were satisfied with the quality of local services and that nearly two out of three northern Virginia residents (Fairfax and Loudoun counties) were satisfied with the value of their property taxes in terms of what they receive in local services. The study also found that 91 percent of Fairfax or Loudoun residents rate their counties as good places to live. Residents in the Virginia counties ranked services, governance and quality of life much higher than did residents of Long Island.

In the 21st century, FCEDA has made diversification of the county economy one of its major goals. Balancing this employment base with companies not reliant on government procurement became an even more imperative goal in light of federal spending cuts following the Great Recession of 2007 and 2008.

In April 2010, FCEDA launched a new advertising campaign.
