= Hutchison, Virginia =

Hutchison
- Census-designated place
- Location within the state of Virginia Hutchison (Virginia) Hutchison (the United States)
- Coordinates: 38°57′53″N 77°24′30″W
- Country: United States of America
- State: Virginia
- County: Fairfax

Government
  - Type: None, multiple homeowners' associations

Area
  - Total: 0.54 sq mi (1.4 km^{2})
- Elevation: 364 ft (111 m)

Population (2020)
  - Total: 6,231
  - Density: 11,539/sq mi (4,455/km^{2})
- Time zone: UTC-5 (Eastern (EST))
  - Summer (DST): UTC-4 (EDT)
- ZIP codes: 20170
- Area codes: 571, 703

Hutchison is a census designated place in Fairfax County, Virginia, United States. It is a residential development just north of Virginia State Route 267, located 23 miles west of Washington, D.C. The community is one of the census-designated places newly recognized for the 2020 United States census.

As of the 2020 census, the population of Hutchison is 6,231.

== History ==
Northwestern Fairfax County was not destroyed during the Civil War and instead used as a supply station for both the Union and the Confederate armies. After the war, Union soldiers and Northern civilians alike relocated to the inexpensive area, with most residents being dairy farmers for the next few decades. In 1912, Herndon began receiving service from an electric trolley operated by the Washington & Old Dominion Railroad, and the area experienced further growth from Washington workers who commuted via the trolley.

Hutchison itself began to be developed during the 1970s, with a mixture of single-family homes and townhomes modeled on those of nearby Reston. In 1975, Hutchison Elementary School was founded to serve the small community, previously served by Herndon Elementary School.

== Demographics ==
Hutchison first appeared as a census designated place in the 2020 U.S. census.

Hutchison CDP, Virginia – Racial and ethnic composition Note: the US Census treats Hispanic/Latino as an ethnic category. This table excludes Latinos from the racial categories and assigns them to a separate category. Hispanics/Latinos may be of any race.
Race / Ethnicity (NH = Non-Hispanic)	Pop 2020	2020
White alone (NH)	1,106	17.75%
Black or African American alone (NH)	767	12.31%
Native American or Alaska Native alone (NH)	8	0.13%
Asian alone (NH)	1,432	22.98%
Native Hawaiian or Pacific Islander alone (NH)	1	0.02%
Other race alone (NH)	33	0.53%
Mixed race or Multiracial (NH)	188	3.02%
Hispanic or Latino (any race)	2,696	43.27%
Total	6,231	100.00%
