= Difficult Run, Virginia =

Difficult Run
- Census-designated place
- Location within the state of Virginia Difficult Run (the United States)
- Country: United States of America
- State: Virginia
- County: Fairfax

Area
  - Land: 8.38 sq mi (21.70 km^{2})

Population (2020)
  - Total: 10,600
  - Density: 1,265/sq mi (488.5/km^{2})
- Time zone: UTC-5 (Eastern (EST))
  - Summer (DST): UTC-4 (EDT)

Difficult Run is a census designated place in Fairfax County, Virginia, United States. The population was 10,600 at the 2020 census.

== Geography ==
The CDP has a land area of 8.38 square miles.

== Demographics ==
Historical population
Census	Pop.	Note	%±
2020	10,600		—
U.S. Decennial Census 2020

Difficult Run first appeared as a census designated place in the 2020 U.S. census.

=== 2020 census ===
As of the 2020 census, Difficult Run had a population of 10,600. The median age was 46.0 years. 25.1% of residents were under the age of 18 and 18.9% were 65 years of age or older. For every 100 females there were 100.8 males, and for every 100 females age 18 and over there were 97.1 males age 18 and over.

There were 3,451 households in Difficult Run, of which 41.5% had children under the age of 18 living in them. Of all households, 81.5% were married-couple households, 6.5% were households with a male householder and no spouse or partner present, and 9.9% were households with a female householder and no spouse or partner present. About 8.7% of all households were made up of individuals and 5.6% had someone living alone who was 65 years of age or older.

There were 3,519 housing units, of which 1.9% were vacant. The homeowner vacancy rate was 0.4% and the rental vacancy rate was 4.8%. 100.0% of residents lived in urban areas, while 0.0% lived in rural areas.

The population density was 1,264.9 inhabitants per square mile (488.4 inhabitants/km^{2}). The average housing unit density was 419.9 per square mile (162.1/km^{2}).

Difficult Run CDP, Virginia – Racial and ethnic composition Note: the US Census treats Hispanic/Latino as an ethnic category. This table excludes Latinos from the racial categories and assigns them to a separate category. Hispanics/Latinos may be of any race.
Race / Ethnicity (NH = Non-Hispanic)	Pop 2020	2020
White alone (NH)	7,635	72.03%
Black or African American alone (NH)	149	1.41%
Native American or Alaska Native alone (NH)	6	0.06%
Asian alone (NH)	1,561	14.73%
Native Hawaiian or Pacific Islander alone (NH)	3	0.03%
Other race alone (NH)	75	0.71%
Mixed race or Multiracial (NH)	575	5.42%
Hispanic or Latino (any race)	596	5.62%
Total	10,600	100.00%

=== Demographic estimates ===
At the 2022 American Community Survey, the average family household had 3.27 people.

The largest ancestry is the 18.2% who had English ancestry, 15.0% spoke a language other than English at home, and 12.9% were born outside the United States, 83.1% of whom were naturalized citizens.

The median income for a household in the CDP was $250,000. 8.1% of the population were military veterans, and 82.5% had a bachelor's degree or higher. In the CDP 0.8% of the population was below the poverty line, none of those under age 18 and 0.5% of those age 65 or over, with 0.9% of the population without health insurance.
