= Virginia's 11th congressional district =

U.S. House district for Virginia

Coordinates: 38°47′18″N 77°17′41″W

- Interactive map of district boundaries since 2023
- Representative: James Walkinshaw; D–Wakefield, Fairfax County
- Distribution: 99.97% urban; 0.03% rural
- Population (2025): 810,626
- Median household income: $163,409
- Ethnicity: 47% White; 22% Asian; 15% Hispanic; 9% Black; 6% Two or more races; 1% other
- Cook PVI: D+18

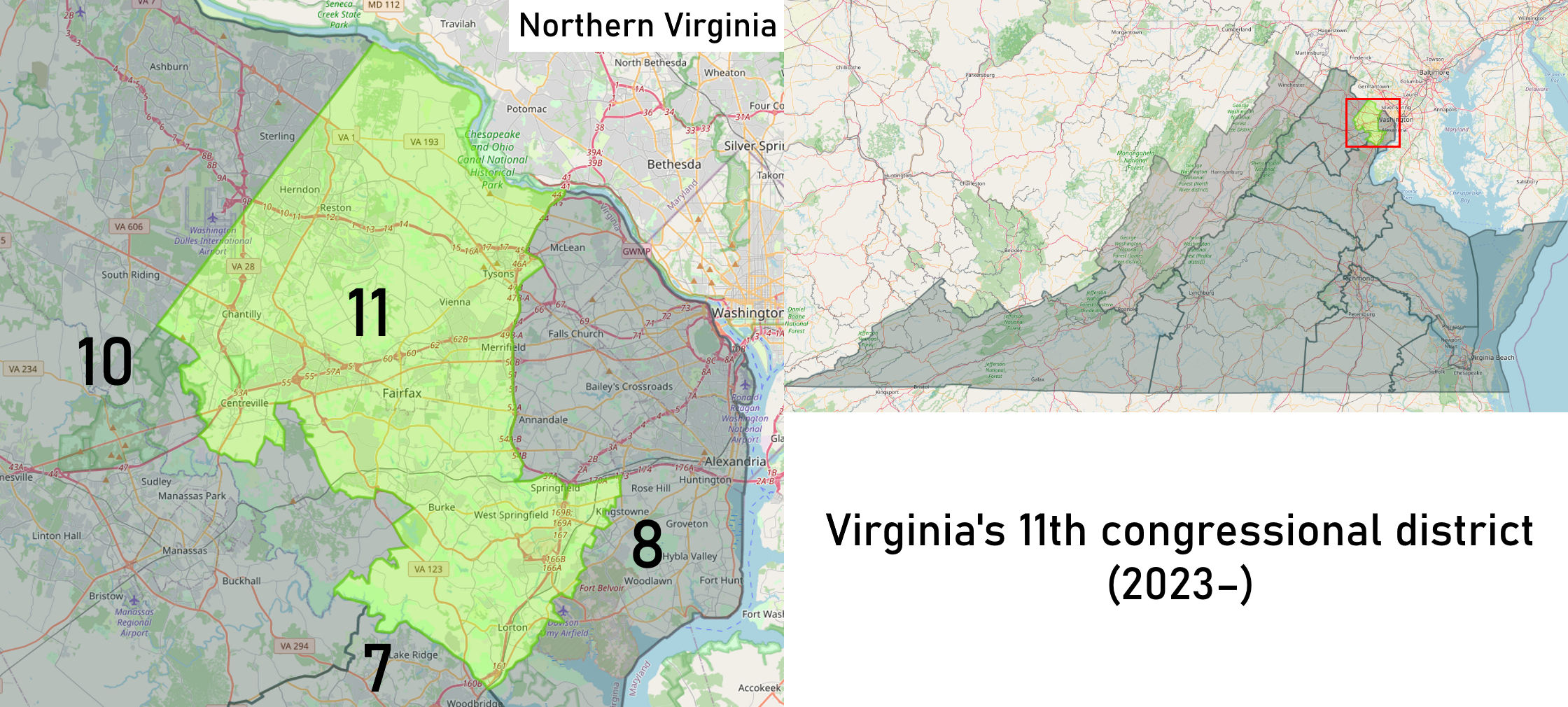
Virginia's 11th congressional district from January 3, 2023

Virginia's 11th congressional district is a U.S. congressional district in the Commonwealth of Virginia. Situated in the Northern Virginia suburbs, the district comprises most of Fairfax County and the entirety of Fairfax City. It has been represented by Democrat James Walkinshaw since September 2025.

The Hill newspaper quotes census data to conclude that Virginia's 11th district was the wealthiest congressional district in the nation from 2003 to 2013. The article attributed the wealth to "the presence of high-level federal workers and two-income families" and because "lobbyists and other corporate types flock to the D.C. area".

== History ==
The district last existed in what is now West Virginia's 1st district and was held by Jacob B. Blair before the events of the U.S. Civil War. Virginia did not have an 11th district until it was re-created after the 1990 United States census from portions of the old 8th and 10th districts because of explosive growth in Northern Virginia. It was intended to be a "fair fight" district; indeed, it encompassed most of the more Democratic portions of the old 10th district and the more Republican portions of the old 8th district.

George W. Bush only narrowly defeated John Kerry here in 2004, while Democratic Governor Tim Kaine and Democratic Senator Jim Webb both carried this district, in 2005 and 2006 respectively. In 2008, Barack Obama won this district over Republican Senator John McCain. As of 2025, the last time Republicans won this district was in the 2009 Virginia gubernatorial election, when Republican Bob McDonnell carried it, along with incumbent Lieutenant Governor Bill Bolling in the lieutenant gubernatorial race. Democrat Leslie Byrne briefly held the seat for the first election cycle of the new district, but was quickly defeated in 1994 by Republican Tom Davis. Davis established a secure hold on the district during his tenure (1995–2008), but Democrat Gerry Connolly won it when Davis announced retirement and later resigned before his term ended.

Both Davis and Connolly may have been aided by their previous service on the Board of Supervisors of Fairfax County, where most of the 11th district's population is concentrated. 96.7% of 11th congressional district residents live in Fairfax County, with the remaining 3.3% living in Fairfax City.

== Recent electoral history ==
=== 1990s ===
Virginia's 11th Congressional District election (new district), 1992
Party	Candidate	Votes	%
Democratic	Leslie L. Byrne	114,172	50.02
Republican	Henry N. Butler	103,119	45.17
Independent	A. T. "Art" Narro	6,681	2.93
Independent	Perry J. Mitchell	4,155	1.82
Write-ins		145	0.06
Total votes		228,272	100.00

Virginia's 11th Congressional District election, 1994
Party	Candidate	Votes	%
Republican	Tom Davis	98,216	52.90
Democratic	Leslie L. Byrne (inc.)	84,104	45.30
Independent	Gordon S. Cruickshank	3,246	1.75
Write-ins		114	0.06
Total votes		185,680	100.00
Republican gain from Democratic			

Virginia's 11th Congressional District election, 1996
Party	Candidate	Votes	%
Republican	Tom Davis (inc.)	138,758	64.10
Democratic	Thomas J. Horton	74,701	34.51
Independent	C. W. "Levi" Levy	2,842	1.31
Write-ins		181	0.08
Total votes		216,482	100.00
Republican hold			

Virginia's 11th Congressional District election, 1998
Party	Candidate	Votes	%
Republican	Tom Davis (inc.)	91,603	81.71
Independent	C. W. "Levi" Levy	18,807	16.78
Write-ins		1,701	1.52
Total votes		112,111	100.00
Republican hold			

=== 2000s ===
Virginia's 11th Congressional District election, 2000
Party	Candidate	Votes	%
Republican	Tom Davis (inc.)	150,395	61.90
Democratic	Mike L. Corrigan	83,455	34.35
Independent	Robert K. McBride	4,774	1.96
Independent	C. W. "Levi" Levy	4,059	1.67
Write-ins		285	0.12
Total votes		242,968	100.00
Republican hold			

Virginia's 11th Congressional District election, 2002
Party	Candidate	Votes	%
Republican	Tom Davis (inc.)	135,379	82.90
Constitution	Frank W. Creel	26,892	16.47
Write-ins		1,027	0.63
Total votes		163,298	100.00
Republican hold			

Virginia's 11th Congressional District election, 2004
Party	Candidate	Votes	%
Republican	Tom Davis (inc.)	186,299	60.25
Democratic	Ken Longmyer	118,305	38.26
Independent	Joseph P. Oddo	4,338	1.40
Write-ins		259	0.08
Total votes		309,233	100.00
Republican hold			

Virginia's 11th Congressional District election, 2006
Party	Candidate	Votes	%
Republican	Tom Davis (inc.)	130,468	55.45
Democratic	Andrew L. Hurst	102,411	43.57
Independent Greens	Ferdinando C. Greco	2,042	0.87
Write-ins		259	0.11
Total votes		235,280	100.00
Republican hold			

Virginia's 11th Congressional District election, 2008
Party	Candidate	Votes	%
Democratic	Gerry Connolly	196,598	54.69
Republican	Keith Fimian	154,758	43.05
Independent Greens	Joseph P. Oddo	7,271	2.02
Write-ins		864	0.24
Total votes		359,491	100.00
Democratic gain from Republican			

=== 2010s ===
Virginia's 11th Congressional District election, 2010
Party	Candidate	Votes	%
Democratic	Gerry Connolly (inc.)	111,720	49.22
Republican	Keith Fimian	110,739	48.79
Independent	Christopher F. DeCarlo	1,846	0.81
Libertarian	David L. Dotson	1,382	0.60
Independent Greens	David William Gillis, Jr.	959	0.42
Write-ins		305	0.13
Total votes		226,951	100
Democratic hold			

Virginia's 11th Congressional District election, 2012
Party	Candidate	Votes	%
Democratic	Gerry Connolly (inc.)	202,606	60.98
Republican	Christopher Perkins	117,902	35.49
Independent	Mark T. Gibson	3,806	1.15
Independent	Christopher F. DeCarlo	3,027	0.91
Green	Joe F. Galdo	2,195	0.66
Independent Greens	Peter M. Marchetti	1,919	0.58
Write-ins		788	0.24
Total votes		332,243	100
Democratic hold			

Virginia's 11th Congressional District election, 2014
Party	Candidate	Votes	%
Democratic	Gerry Connolly (inc.)	106,780	56.86
Republican	Suzanne Scholte	75,796	40.36
Libertarian	Marc Harrold	3,264	1.74
Green	Joe F. Galdo	1,739	0.93
Write-ins		226	0.12
Total votes		187,805	100
Democratic hold			

Virginia's 11th Congressional District election, 2016
Party	Candidate	Votes	%
Democratic	Gerry Connolly (inc.)	247,818	87.88
Write-ins		34,185	12.12
Total votes		282,003	100
Democratic hold			

Virginia's 11th Congressional District election, 2018
Party	Candidate	Votes	%
Democratic	Gerry Connolly (inc.)	219,191	71.11
Republican	Jeff Dove	83,023	26.93
Libertarian	Stevan Porter	5,546	1.80
Write-ins		490	0.16
Total votes		308,250	100
Democratic hold			

=== 2020s ===
Virginia's 11th Congressional District election, 2020
Party	Candidate	Votes	%
Democratic	Gerry Connolly (inc.)	280,725	71.4
Republican	Manga Anantatmula	111,380	28.3
Write-in		1,136	0.3
Total votes		393,241	100
Democratic hold			

Virginia's 11th Congressional District election, 2022
Party	Candidate	Votes	%
Democratic	Gerry Connolly (inc.)	193,190	66.7
Republican	Jim Myles	95,634	33.0
Write-in		828	0.3
Total votes		289,652	100.0
Democratic hold			

Virginia's 11th Congressional District election, 2024
Party	Candidate	Votes	%
Democratic	Gerry Connolly (inc.)	273,529	66.7
Republican	Mike Van Meter	134,802	32.9
Write-in		1,855	0.5
Total votes		410,186	100.0
Democratic hold			

2025 Virginia's 11th congressional district special election
Party	Candidate	Votes	%
Democratic	James Walkinshaw	113,596	75.14
Republican	Stewart Whitson	37,297	24.67
Write-in		287	0.19
Total votes		151,180	100.00
Democratic hold			

== Recent election results from statewide races ==
Year	Office	Results
2008	President	Obama 59% - 40%
2008	Senate	Warner 67% - 32%
2009	Governor	McDonnell 53% - 47%
2009	Lt. Governor	Bolling 50.1% - 49.9%
2009	Attorney General	Shannon 51% - 49%
2012	President	Obama 58% - 40%
2012	Senate	Kaine 60% - 40%
2013	Governor	McAuliffe 57% - 37%
2013	Lt. Governor	Northam 62% - 37%
2013	Attorney General	Herring 60% - 40%
2014	Senate	Warner 56% - 41%
2016	President	Clinton 63% - 30%
2017	Governor	Northam 67% - 32%
2017	Lt. Governor	Fairfax 67% - 33%
2017	Attorney General	Herring 67% - 33%
2018	Senate	Kaine 70% - 27%
2020	President	Biden 69% - 28%
2020	Senate	Warner 69% - 30%
2021	Governor	McAuliffe 64% - 35%
2021	Lt. Governor	Ayala 65% - 35%
2021	Attorney General	Herring 65% - 35%
2024	President	Harris 65% - 31%
2024	Senate	Kaine 67% - 32%
2025	Governor	Spanberger 74% - 26%
2025	Lt. Governor	Hashmi 71% - 29%
2025	Attorney General	Jones 68% - 31%

== Composition ==
For the 118th and successive Congresses (based on redistricting following the 2020 census), the district contains all or portions of the following counties and communities:

Fairfax County (46)

Braddock (part; also 10th), Burke, Burke Centre, Centreville, Chantilly, Crosspointe, Difficult Run, Dranesville, Dunn Loring, Fairfax Station (part; also 10th), Fair Lakes, Fair Oaks, Floris, Franconia (part; also 8th), Franklin Farm, George Mason, Great Falls, Great Falls Crossing, Greenbriar, Herndon, Hutchinson, Kings Park, Kings Park West, Laurel Hill, Long Branch, Lorton, Mantua, McLean (part; also 8th), McNair, Merrifield, Navy, Newington, Newington Forest, Oakton, Ravensworth, Reston, South Run, Springfield (part; also 8th), Sully Square, Tysons, Union Mill (part; also 10th), Vienna, Wakefield, West Springfield, Wolf Trap, Woodburn

Independent city (1)

Fairfax

== List of members representing the district ==
Representative	Party	Years	Cong ress	Electoral history
District established March 4, 1793
Josiah Parker (Macclesfield)	Pro-Administration	March 4, 1793 – March 3, 1795	3rd 4th 5th 6th	Redistricted from the 8th district and re-elected in 1793. Re-elected in 1795. Re-elected in 1797. Re-elected in 1799. Lost re-election.
Josiah Parker (Macclesfield)	Federalist	March 4, 1795 – March 3, 1801	3rd 4th 5th 6th	Redistricted from the 8th district and re-elected in 1793. Re-elected in 1795. Re-elected in 1797. Re-elected in 1799. Lost re-election.
Thomas Newton Jr. (Norfolk)	Democratic-Republican	March 4, 1801 – March 3, 1803	7th	Elected in 1801. Redistricted to the 20th district.
Anthony New (Gloucester County)	Democratic-Republican	March 4, 1803 – March 3, 1805	8th	Redistricted from the 16th district and re-elected in 1803. Retired.
James M. Garnett (Loretto)	Democratic-Republican	March 4, 1805 – March 3, 1809	9th 10th	Elected in 1805. Re-elected in 1807. Retired.
John Roane (Uppowac)	Democratic-Republican	March 4, 1809 – March 3, 1813	11th 12th	Elected in 1809. Re-elected in 1811. Redistricted to the 12th district.
John Dawson	Democratic-Republican	March 4, 1813 – March 31, 1814	13th	Redistricted from the 10th district and re-elected in 1813. Died.
Vacant		March 31, 1814 – September 19, 1814	13th	
Philip P. Barbour (Gordonsville)	Democratic-Republican (Note: Supported the Crawford faction in the 1824 United States presidential election)	September 19, 1814 – March 3, 1825	13th 14th 15th 16th 17th 18th	Elected in June 1814 to finish Dawson's term and seated September 19, 1814. Re-elected in 1815. Re-elected in 1817. Re-elected in 1819. Re-elected in 1821. Re-elected in 1823. Retired.
Robert Taylor (Orange)	Anti-Jacksonian	March 4, 1825 – March 3, 1827	19th	Elected in 1825. Retired.
Philip P. Barbour (Gordonsville)	Jacksonian	March 4, 1827 – October 15, 1830	20th 21st	Elected in 1827. Re-elected in 1829. Resigned to become U.S. Circuit Court judge.
Vacant		October 16, 1830 – November 24, 1830	21st	
John M. Patton (Fredericksburg)	Jacksonian	November 25, 1830 – March 3, 1833	21st 22nd	Elected to finish Barbour's term Re-elected in 1831. Redistricted to the 13th district.
Andrew Stevenson (Richmond)	Jacksonian	March 4, 1833 – June 2, 1834	23rd	Elected in 1833. Resigned.
Vacant		June 3, 1834 – December 7, 1834	23rd	
John Robertson (Richmond)	Anti-Jacksonian	December 8, 1834 – March 3, 1837	23rd 24th 25th	Elected to finish Stevenson's term Re-elected in 1835. Re-elected in 1837. Retired.
John Robertson (Richmond)	Whig	March 4, 1837 – March 3, 1839	23rd 24th 25th	Elected to finish Stevenson's term Re-elected in 1835. Re-elected in 1837. Retired.
John M. Botts (Richmond)	Whig	March 4, 1839 – March 3, 1843	26th 27th	Elected in 1839. Re-elected in 1841. Lost re-election.
William Taylor (Lexington)	Democratic	March 4, 1843 – January 17, 1846	28th 29th	Elected in 1843. Re-elected in 1845. Died.
Vacant		January 18, 1846 – March 5, 1846	29th	
James McDowell (Lexington)	Democratic	March 6, 1846 – March 3, 1851	29th 30th 31st	Elected to finish Taylor's term Re-elected in 1847. Re-elected in 1849. Retired.
John Letcher (Lexington)	Democratic	March 4, 1851 – March 3, 1853	32nd	Elected in 1851. Redistricted to the 9th district.
John F. Snodgrass (Parkersburg)	Democratic	March 4, 1853 – June 5, 1854	33rd	Elected in 1853. Died.
Vacant		June 6, 1854 – December 3, 1854	33rd	
Charles S. Lewis (Clarksburg)	Democratic	December 4, 1854 – March 3, 1855	33rd	Elected to finish Snodgrass's term Lost re-election.
John S. Carlile (Clarksburg)	American	March 4, 1855 – March 3, 1857	34th	Elected in 1855. Lost re-election.
Albert G. Jenkins (Green Bottom)	Democratic	March 4, 1857 – March 3, 1861	35th 36th	Elected in 1857. Re-elected in 1859. Resigned (Civil War).
John S. Carlile (Wheeling)	Union	March 4, 1861 – July 9, 1861	37th	Elected in 1861. Resigned to become U.S. Senator.
Vacant		July 10, 1861 – December 1, 1861	37th	
Jacob B. Blair (Parkersburg)	Union	December 2, 1861 – March 3, 1863	37th	Elected to finish Carlile's term Retired.
District dissolved March 3, 1863
District re-established January 3, 1993
Leslie Byrne (Falls Church)	Democratic	January 3, 1993 – January 3, 1995	103rd	Elected in 1992. Lost re-election.
Tom Davis (Vienna)	Republican	January 3, 1995 – November 24, 2008	104th 105th 106th 107th 108th 109th 110th	Elected in 1994. Re-elected in 1996. Re-elected in 1998. Re-elected in 2000. Re-elected in 2002. Re-elected in 2004. Re-elected in 2006. Announced retirement, then resigned.
Vacant		November 24, 2008 – January 3, 2009	110th	
Gerry Connolly (Mantua)	Democratic	January 3, 2009 – May 21, 2025	111th 112th 113th 114th 115th 116th 117th 118th 119th	Elected in 2008. Re-elected in 2010. Re-elected in 2012. Re-elected in 2014. Re-elected in 2016. Re-elected in 2018. Re-elected in 2020. Re-elected in 2022. Re-elected in 2024. Announced retirement, then died.
Vacant		May 21, 2025 – September 10, 2025	119th	
James Walkinshaw (Wakefield)	Democratic	September 10, 2025 – present	119th	Elected to finish Connolly’s term. Re-elected in 2026.

== Historical district boundaries ==
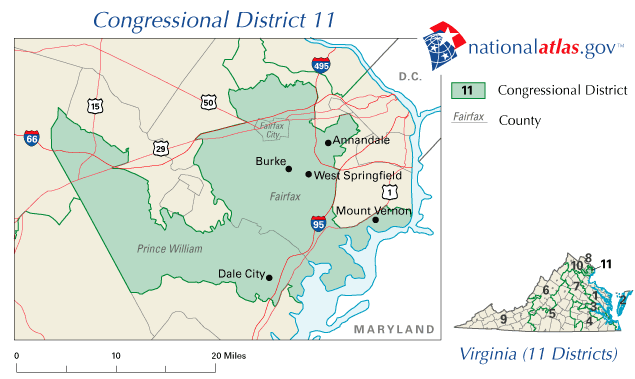
2003–2013

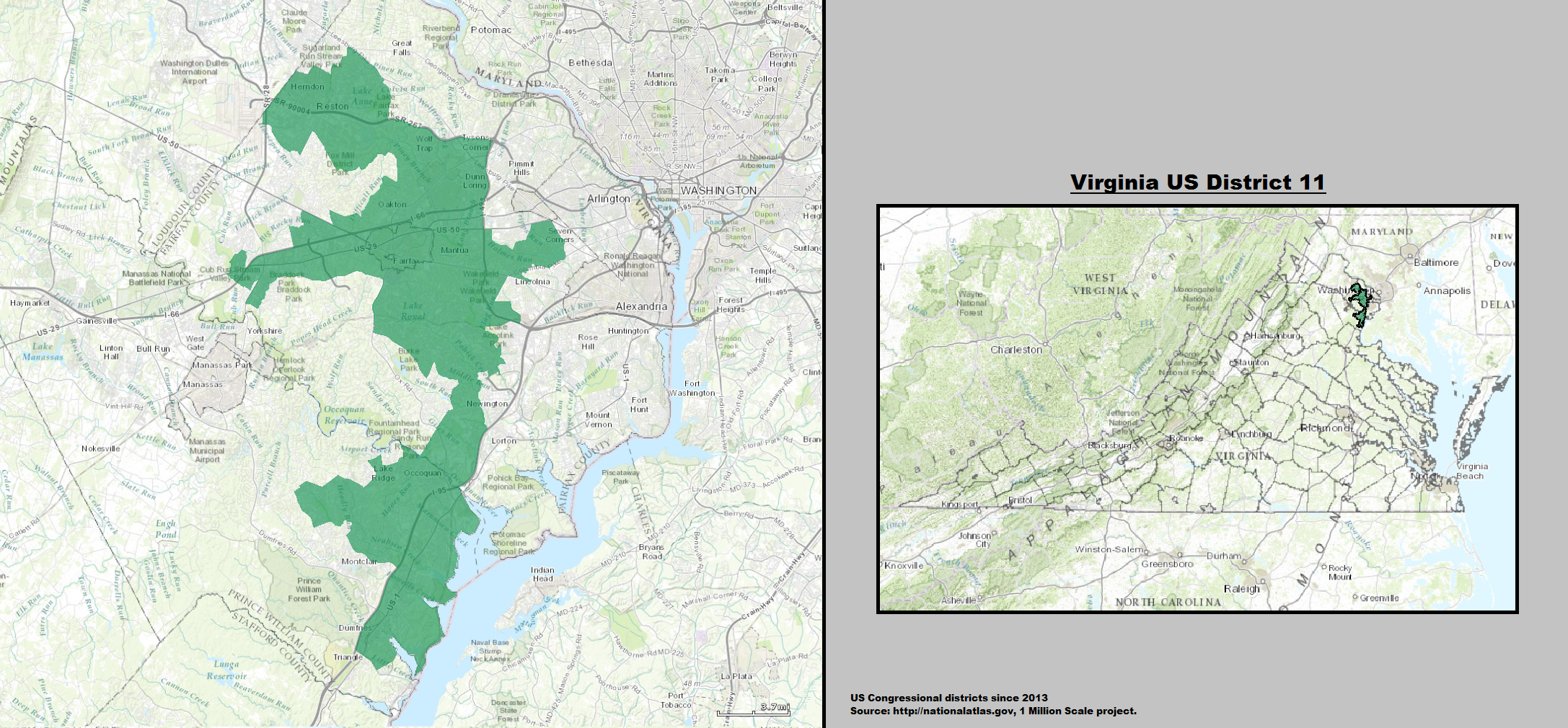
2013–2023

== See also ==
- Virginia's congressional districts
- List of United States congressional districts
- 2010 Virginia's 11th congressional district election
- 2025 Virginia's 11th congressional district special election
