= Doveville, Virginia =

Unincorporated community in Virginia, United States

- Unincorporated community
- Location within Northern Virginia Location within Virginia Location within the United States
- Coordinates: 38°50′13″N 77°15′33″W
- Country: United States
- State: Virginia
- County: Fairfax
- Time zone: UTC-5 (Eastern (EST))
  - Summer (DST): UTC-4 (EDT)
- Area codes: 571 & 703

Doveville is an unincorporated community in Fairfax County, in the U.S. state of Virginia. It lies along Virginia State Highway 236, west of Annandale, east of the independent city of Fairfax and southwest of Merrifield. Immediately to the south is Rutherford and immediately to the north is Mantua. Numerous parks are located nearby, including Long Branch Stream Valley Park to the south, Daniels Run Park to the west and Woodburn Road Park and Accotink Stream Valley Park to the northeast.

== Notable landmarks ==
To the east lies Northern Virginia Community College Annandale Campus. Churches of note include Highview Christian Fellowship, Providence Presbyterian Church, Barcroft Bible Church, Fairfax Seventh-Day Adventist and Bethlehem Lutheran Church. The Jewish Community Centre of Northern Virginia also lies in the northeastern part of Doveville. It also contains the Wilbert Tucker Woodson High School, the largest building in the community.
