= North Springfield, Virginia =

- Census-designated place
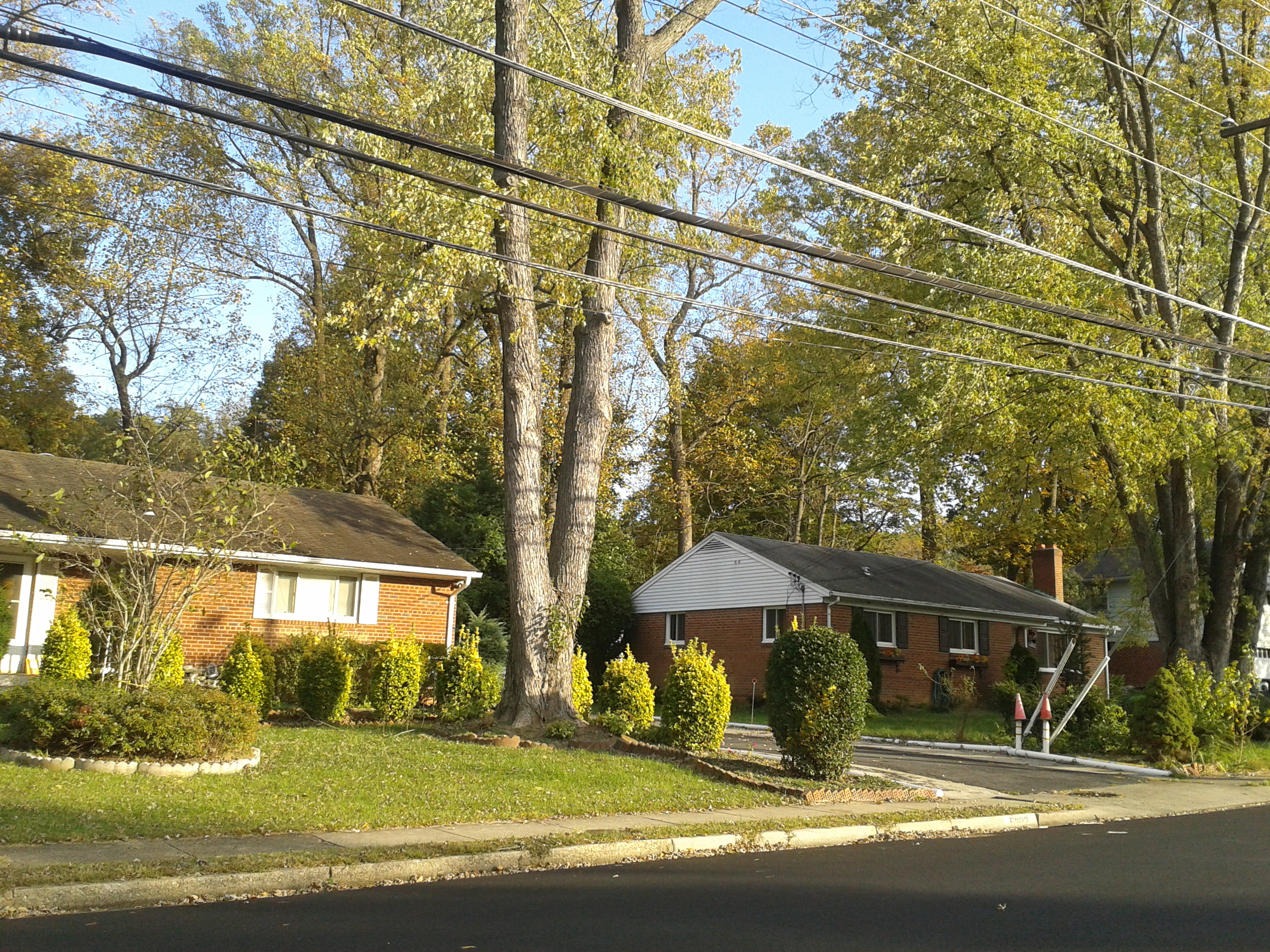
- Houses in North Springfield, October, 2016

- Location of North Springfield in Fairfax County, Virginia

- Location within Northern Virginia Location within Virginia Location within the United States
- Coordinates: 38°48′14″N 77°12′30″W
- Country: United States
- State: Virginia
- County: Fairfax

Area
  - Total: 1.55 sq mi (4.02 km^{2})
  - Land: 1.54 sq mi (3.99 km^{2})
  - Water: 0.012 sq mi (0.03 km^{2})
- Elevation: 302 ft (92 m)

Population (2020)
  - Total: 7,430
  - Density: 4,719/sq mi (1,821.9/km^{2})
- Time zone: UTC−5 (Eastern (EST))
  - Summer (DST): UTC−4 (EDT)
- ZIP code: 22151
- Area codes: 703, 571
- FIPS code: 51-57560
- GNIS feature ID: 1493357

North Springfield is a census-designated place (CDP) in Fairfax County, Virginia, United States. As of the 2020 census, North Springfield had a population of 7,430.

== Geography ==
North Springfield is located in southern Fairfax County at 38°48′14″N 77°12′30″W (38.803813, −77.208213). Its borders are the Capital Beltway and Norfolk Southern Railway to the south, Flag Run and the Capital Beltway to the west, Braddock Road to the north, and Backlick Run and Backlick Road to the east. Neighboring communities are Springfield to the east and south, Kings Park and Ravensworth to the west, Wakefield to the northwest, and Annandale to the north. The Capital Beltway (Interstate 495) is accessible from Exit 54 (Braddock Road) at the northwest corner of the CDP. Downtown Washington, D.C. is 14 miles (23 km) to the northeast.

According to the United States Census Bureau, the North Springfield CDP has a total area of 1.5 square miles (4.0 km^{2}), of which 0.01 square miles (0.03 km^{2}), or 96.65%, is water.

== Demographics ==
=== 2020 census ===
North Springfield CDP, Virginia – Racial and ethnic composition Note: the US Census treats Hispanic/Latino as an ethnic category. This table excludes Latinos from the racial categories and assigns them to a separate category. Hispanics/Latinos may be of any race.
Race / Ethnicity (NH = Non-Hispanic)	Pop 2000	Pop 2010	Pop 2020	% 2000	% 2010	% 2020
White alone (NH)	6,127	3,194	2,619	66.79%	43.91%	35.25%
Black or African American alone (NH)	334	442	332	3.64%	6.08%	4.47%
Native American or Alaska Native alone (NH)	10	10	2	0.11%	0.14%	0.03%
Asian alone (NH)	1,475	1,540	1,898	16.08%	21.17%	25.55%
Native Hawaiian or Pacific Islander alone (NH)	19	4	2	0.21%	0.05%	0.03%
Other race alone (NH)	12	27	65	0.13%	0.37%	0.87%
Mixed race or Multiracial (NH)	233	168	283	2.54%	2.31%	3.81%
Hispanic or Latino (any race)	963	1,889	2,229	10.50%	25.97%	30.00%
Total	9,173	7,274	7,430	100.00%	100.00%	100.00%

=== 2000 census ===
As of the census of 2000, there were 9,173 people, 3,251 households, and 2,470 families residing in the CDP. The population density was 3,762.2 inhabitants per square mile (1,452.6/km^{2}). There were 3,291 housing units at an average density of 1,349.8 per square mile (521.2/km^{2}). The racial makeup of the CDP was 71.99% White, 3.65% African American, 0.17% Native American, 16.13% Asian, 0.21% Pacific Islander, 4.63% from other races, and 3.21% from two or more races. Hispanic or Latino of any race were 10.50% of the population.

There were 3,251 households, out of which 34.8% had children under the age of 18 living with them, 64.9% were married couples living together, 7.6% had a female householder with no husband present, and 24.0% were non-families. 17.8% of all households were made up of individuals, and 6.8% had someone living alone who was 65 years of age or older. The average household size was 2.82 and the average family size was 3.19.

In the CDP, the population was spread out, with 24.1% under the age of 18, 6.2% from 18 to 24, 32.8% from 25 to 44, 23.8% from 45 to 64, and 13.1% who were 65 years of age or older. The median age was 38 years. For every 100 females, there were 100.9 males. For every 100 females age 18 and over, there were 99.1 males.

The median income for a household in the CDP was $73,062, and the median income for a family was $80,212. Males had a median income of $49,590 versus $37,938 for females. The per capita income for the CDP was $28,592. About 0.9% of families and 2.5% of the population were below the poverty line, including 1.3% of those under age 18 and 1.0% of those age 65 or over.

== Education ==
Fairfax County Public Schools operates public schools in the area.

North Springfield Elementary School is in the North Springfield CDP and has a Springfield postal address.

Ravensworth Elementary School, which has a Springfield postal address, was defined as being in the North Springfield CDP as per the 1990 U.S. census and the 2000 U.S. census, but in the 2010 U.S. census it was defined as being in Ravensworth CDP.
