= Northern Virginia Community College, Annandale =

Public college in Annandale, Virginia, US

- Type: Public, community college
- Established: 1965
- President: Anne Kress
- Location: Annandale, Virginia, United States; 38.834138°N 77.236692°W
- Campus: Suburban
- Website: http://www.nvcc.edu

The Northern Virginia Community College, Annandale, located in unincorporated Fairfax County, Virginia, is Northern Virginia Community College's largest campus.

== Campus description ==
The Northern Virginia Community College, Annandale is physically located on Little River Turnpike in the Wakefield census-designated place, a Northern Virginia suburb of Washington in Fairfax County. It has an "Annandale, Virginia" postal address. The U.S. Census Bureau defined the campus as being in the Annandale CDP for the 1990 U.S. census and the 2000 U.S. census, but in 2010 separated the area with the NVCC campus into a new CDP.

The campus is about 1 mile (1.6 km) outside the Capital Beltway at exit 52. The campus consists of eight main buildings: the Godwin (CG) Building, the Foodservice (CF) Building, the Classroom (CC) Building, the TV Tech (CT) Building, the McDiarmid (CM) Building, the Ernst Cultural Community Center (CE), the Shuler (CS) Building, and the CN (formerly Nursing) Building. Additionally, there are several other buildings on the campus, such as the campus police station, a greenhouse, and several maintenance buildings. There is a six-story parking garage next to the CN Building, and several large parking lots behind the campus. The back part of the campus is on a large, steep hill; because of this, the parking lot entrance to the CM Building is on the first floor, but the entrance from the terrace between the different buildings is on the third floor.

Bus service is provided to the campus by Metrobus. This campus serves most of Fairfax County.

The Northern Virginia Community College, Annandale is also home to the Lifetime Learning Institute of Northern Virginia (LLI). The Lifetime Learning Institute of Northern Virginia (LLI) is a non-profit, member-run organization of adults age 50 and over who desire to pursue enriching cultural and educational experiences. These experiences are obtained through classroom instruction, travel, discussions, and social interaction with peers.

== Buildings ==
=== Founders Hall (CFH) Building ===
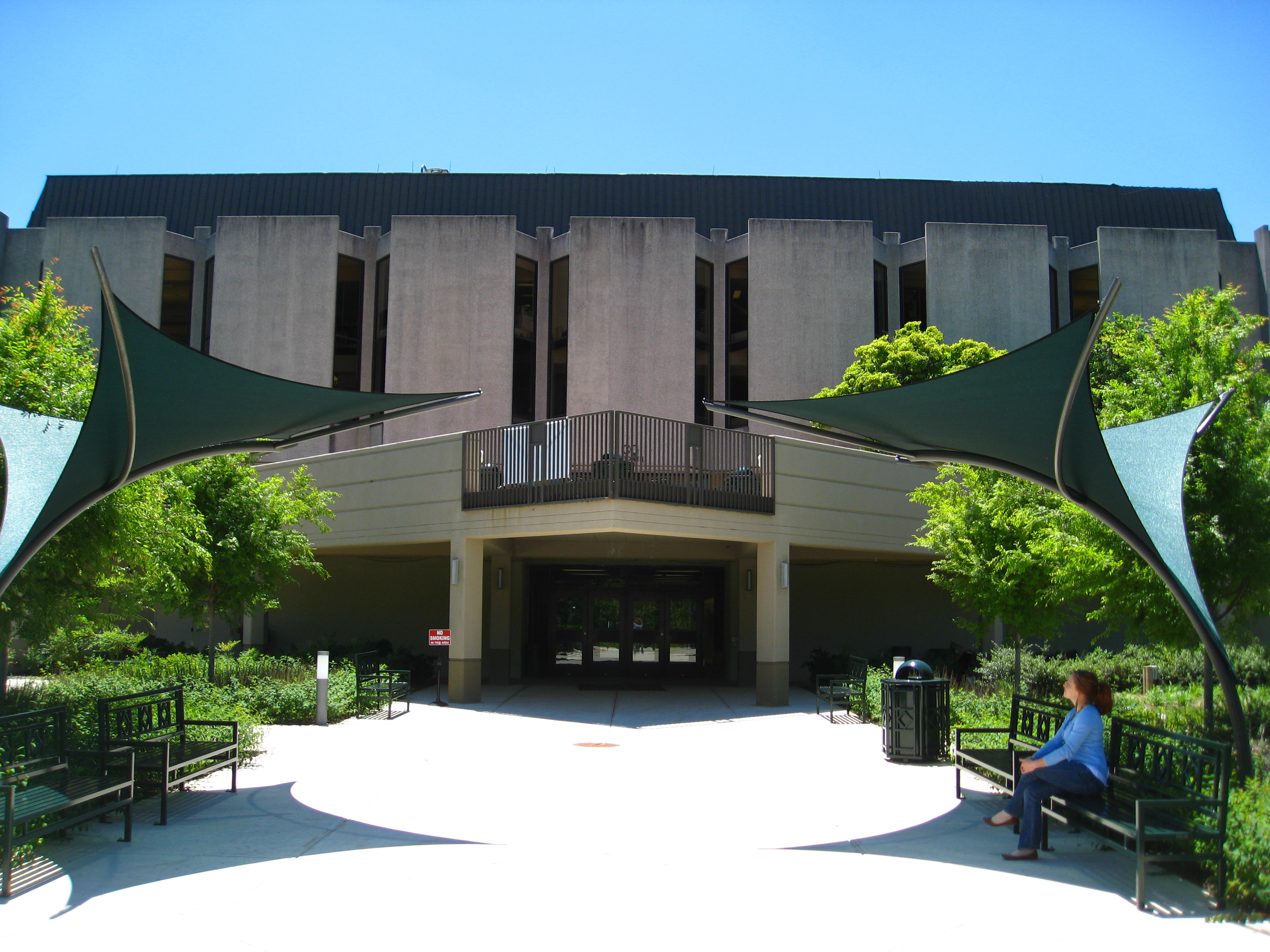
Entrance to the CFH Building.

This four-story building is the central building on campus. The first floor has space for physical education classes, as well as some ESL classrooms. The second floor has faculty offices, the office of the campus provost, the parking services office and an international student center. The third floor is the campus library. The fourth floor has offices, some computer labs, and tutoring centers. There is a tunnel connecting this building to the CE Building.

=== Foodservice (CF) Building ===
This two-story building has the campus cafeteria, as well as an arcade room that also has many vending machines and a microwave oven on the first floor, and student organization rooms and the faculty lounge on the second floor.

In Early 2025, the CF building was closed to undergo renovations, The renovations will include 1 new additional classroom updated food service facilities along with refreshing student spaces. According to the solicitation the renovation should conclude in May 2026.

The GCS-Sigal was awarded the contract at auction for a reported amount of $9,719,699.00

=== Classroom (CC) Building ===
This two-story building contains faculty offices, the office of the Dean of the Business and Public Services Division, and classrooms for business, accounting, and criminal justice classes.

=== TV Tech (CT) Building ===
This five-story building is the tallest on campus (other than the parking garage) and contains mostly classrooms for computer-related classes (many are computer labs), plus foreign language and math classrooms. The top floor is a branch campus and recruiting center for Old Dominion University.

=== McDiarmid (CM) Building ===
This three-story building has mostly math and liberal arts classrooms, as well as several large kitchens for the school's culinary arts and hospitality programs.

=== Ernst Cultural Community Center (CE) ===
This three-story building has a large theater that hosts productions by the school's theater department. The theater can also be rented out by other performers. This building also has several gyms, yoga classrooms, and several conference rooms. There is a tunnel connecting this building to the CG Building.

=== Shuler (CS) Building ===
This two-story building contains science classrooms and labs.

=== CN Building ===
This two-story building, formerly called the Nursing building, contains liberal arts and ESL classrooms, as well as an auditorium. The nursing classes were moved to the Medical Education Campus in Springfield.

=== CA Building ===
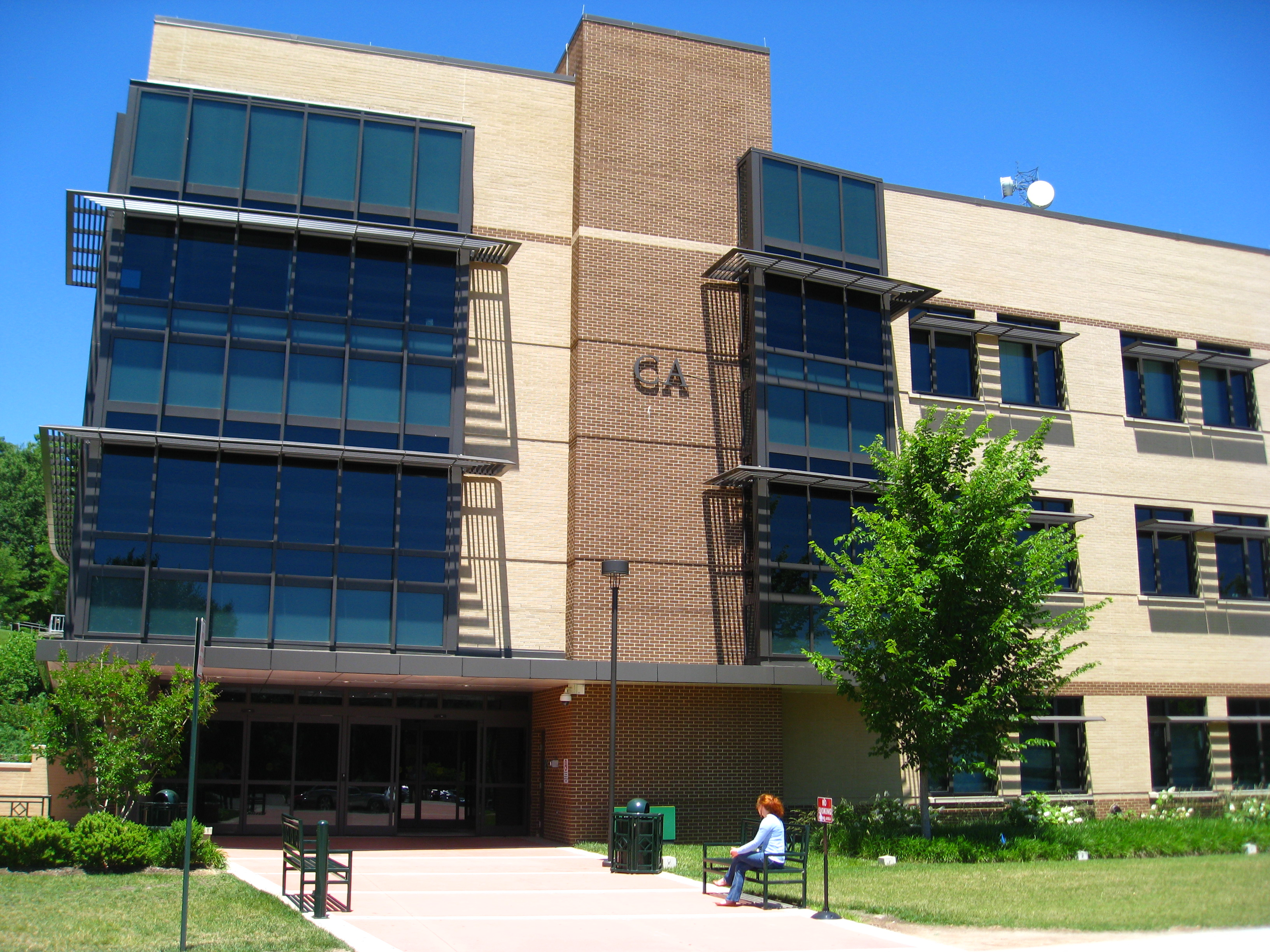
The entrance to the CA building

This building, which opened in the fall of 2011, contains the testing center, counseling services and most student service offices. On the second floor is the campus bookstore. The third floor contains the campus business office and classrooms.

== See also ==
- Northern Virginia Community College
