= George Mason, Virginia =

Unincorporated community in Virginia, US

- Census-designated place
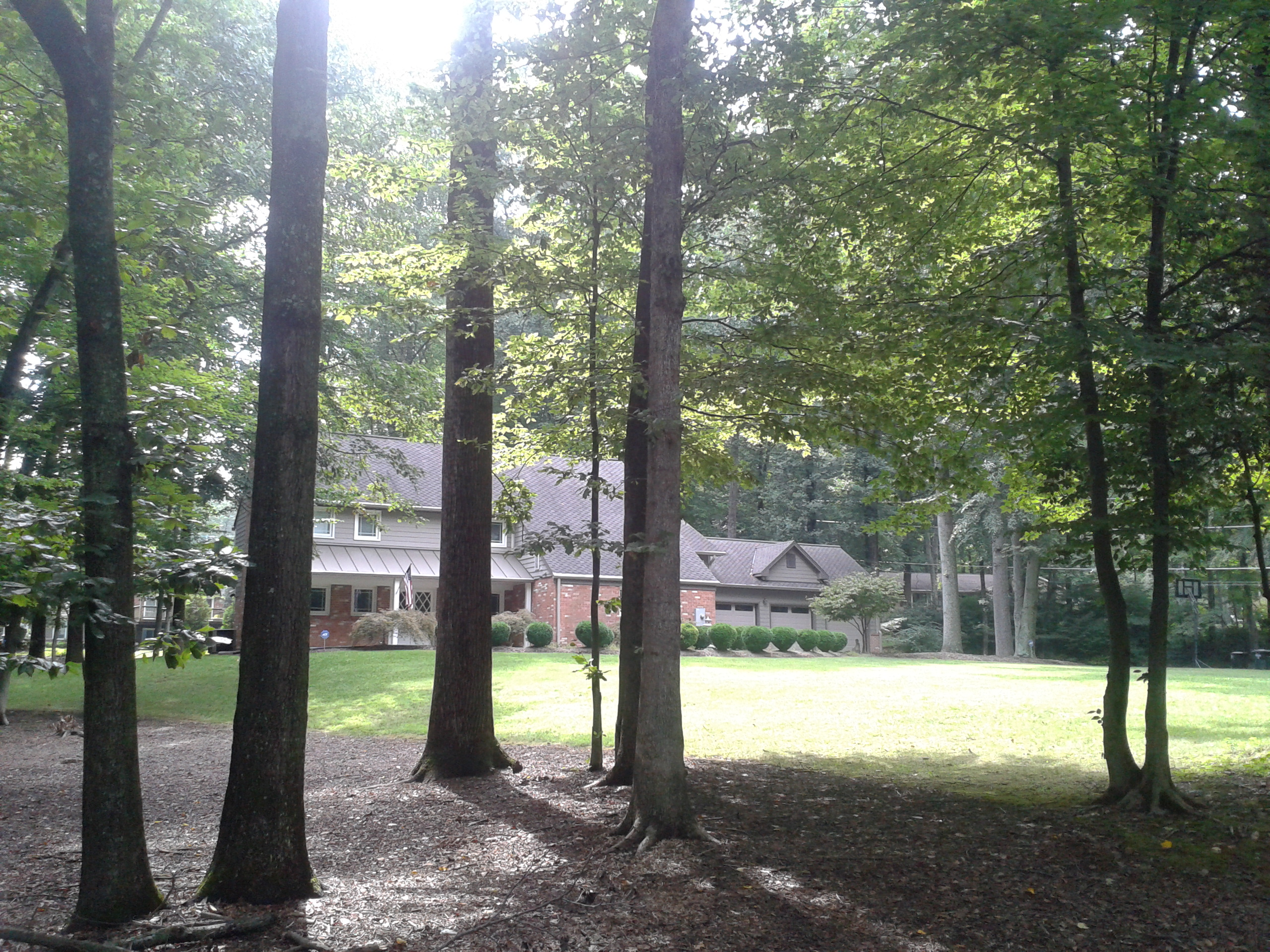
- A house in the CDP, August 2017
- Nickname: GMU
- Location within Northern Virginia Location within Virginia Location within the United States
- Coordinates: 38°49′56″N 77°18′51″W
- Country: United States
- State: Virginia
- County: Fairfax
- Incorporated: July 26, 2013
- Named after: George Mason University

Government
  - Type: Board of Directors
  - Body: Board of Directors
  - President of the Board of Directors: Heather Villavicencio (Nonpartisan)
  - Vice President of the Board of Directors: Julie Stewart

Area
  - Total: 2.53 sq mi (6.55 km^{2})
  - Land: 2.52 sq mi (6.52 km^{2})
  - Water: 0.015 sq mi (0.04 km^{2}) 0.53%
- Elevation: 450 ft (140 m)

Population (2020)
  - Total: 11,162
  - Rank: 40
  - Density: 4,430/sq mi (1,712/km^{2})
- Demonym: Masonian
- Time zone: UTC−5 (Eastern (EST))
  - Summer (DST): UTC−4 (EDT)
- ZIP codes: 22030, 22032
- Area codes: 571, 703
- FIPS code: 51-30618
- GNIS feature ID: 2584851
- Website: http://gmfhoa.org/

George Mason is a census-designated place (CDP) in Fairfax County, Virginia, United States. The population at the 2020 census was 11,162. It consists of George Mason University and some adjacent neighborhoods to the south and southwest of the city of Fairfax, and is named for American Founding Father George Mason.

== History ==
The land that is now George Mason was located on the farm of John and Harriet Burtis, originally of New York State; the Burtises were abolitionists who grew vegetables and raised sheep. On May 25, 1861, Corporal John Barnes of the C.S.A. 17th Virginia Infantry Regiment's Company D, also known as the Fairfax Rifle Rangers, riding with his companion, ordered Burtis to give him provisions. Burtis procured several of his sheep for the Corporal, but refused to use his team of horses to move them to the Confederate camp in Fairfax Station. Barnes eventually convinced a local free black man to move the sheep for him, but loudly declared in the presence of the man that he would arrest Burtis and seize his team. Burtis, having learned of the danger he was in, left with his wife and his team, taking a "...circuitous route through the woods", eventually reaching Washington.

In 1962, planning began for the 150 acres of land donated by the City of Fairfax to be the new campus of George Mason College of the University of Virginia, with the campus opening in 1964. In 1972, Governor of Virginia Linwood Holton signed legislation to separate George Mason College from the University of Virginia, renaming it George Mason University.

A. G. Van Metre Associates began developing George Mason Forest in the early 1980s, and completed the community in 2003, having built approximately 200 single-family homes. On July 3, 2013, the George Mason Forest Homeowners Association filed for incorporation, successfully being granted corporation status on July 26.

== Recreational and cultural activities ==
=== Parks and recreation ===
George Mason is home to several green spaces, with around 3.5 miles of trails, most of which are on the university campus.

Two parks are located in George Mason: Fairfax Villa Park near Shirley Gate Road, and University Park on Braddock Road; a portion of Providence Park, which is mostly in Fairfax, is also in the CDP.

George Mason is also near the Country Club of Fairfax in Fairfax Station.

The CDP is about two miles from the Daniels Run Trail, the Wilcoxon Trail, and the Gerry Connolly Cross County Trail, all in Fairfax, and approximately 2.5 miles from the Accotink Trail in Mantua. George Mason is also home to Mason Pond, a small pond on the university campus; as well as an unnamed pond near Braddock Road, which is the source of Popes Head Creek, which flows into the Occoquan River in unincorporated Fairfax County. Both forks of the Rabbit Branch, which joins up with the Sideburn Branch to from Pohick Creek in Burke, also have their sources in George Mason.

The Villa Aquatic Club, a private pool, is located on Andes Drive in George Mason. George Mason University has four athletic fields for the George Mason Patriots: the George Mason Softball Complex, Sphuler Field, George Mason Stadium, and the George Mason University Tennis Courts.

== Transportation ==
Two major state highways directly serve George Mason: Virginia State Route 123 (Ox Road), which bisects the CDP and the campus, and also connects them to Fairfax, Virginia State Route 236 (Main Street), and U.S. Route 50 / U.S. Route 29 (Lee Highway) in the north, and Fairfax Station, Virginia State Route 654 (Popes Head Road / Zion Drive), and Virginia State Route 643 (Burke Centre Parkway) in the south; and Virginia State Route 620, which forms the CDP's southern border, and connects it to Centreville, Virginia State Route 655 (Shirley Gate Road), and Virginia State Route 286 (Fairfax County Parkway) in the west, and Burke, Virginia State Route 652 (Twinbrook Road), and Virginia State Route 651 (Guinea Road) in the east.

George Mason is approximately two miles from the Burke Centre station on the Virginia Railway Express' Manassas Line and Amtrak's Northeast Regional, and approximately 2.5 miles from the Vienna/Fairfax-GMU Washington Metro station.

George Mason is also served by five Fairfax County Connector bus routes: 306 and 17G, which go from George Mason University to The Pentagon, Green and Gold, which go to the Vienna/Fairfax-GMU station and come back in two different loops, and 29K, which goes to the King Street-Old Town Metro Station in Alexandria.

== Geography ==
The CDP is bordered to the north by the Fairfax city line, to the west by Shirley Gate Road, to the south by Braddock Road, and to the east by Burke Station Road. The university campus is largely to the east of Ox Road (Virginia State Route 123), which runs north to south across the center of the CDP. Many of the university's athletic facilities are west of Ox Road, however. According to the U.S. Census Bureau, the CDP has a total area of 2.5 square miles (6.6 km^{2}), of which 0.02 square miles (0.04 km^{2}), or 0.53%, is water.

== Climate ==
The climate in this area is characterized by hot, humid summers and generally mild to cool winters. According to the Köppen Climate Classification system, George Mason has a humid subtropical climate, abbreviated "Cfa" on climate maps.

Climate data for George Mason, Virginia, 1984–present
Month	Jan	Feb	Mar	Apr	May	Jun	Jul	Aug	Sep	Oct	Nov	Dec	Year
Record high °F (°C)	74 (23)	76 (24)	88 (31)	96 (35)	97 (36)	100 (37)	104 (40)	105 (40)	100 (37)	92 (33)	85 (29)	77 (25)	105 (40)
Average high °F (°C)	42 (5)	45 (7)	55 (12)	66 (18)	75 (23)	83 (28)	87 (30)	85 (29)	79 (26)	68 (20)	58 (14)	46 (7)	66 (18)
Average low °F (°C)	24 (-4)	27 (-2)	34 (1)	43 (6)	52 (11)	61 (16)	67 (19)	65 (18)	58 (14)	45 (7)	37 (2)	28 (-2)	45 (7)
Record low °F (°C)	-10 (-23)	-2 (-18)	-2 (-18)	19 (-7)	29 (-1)	38 (3)	45 (7)	44 (6)	35 (1)	24 (-4)	15 (-9)	-4 (-20)	-10 (-23)
Average precipitation inches (mm)	2.9 (70)	2.9 (70)	3.8 (90)	3.2 (80)	3.8 (90)	3.5 (80)	3.9 (90)	4.2 (100)	3.8 (90)	3.3 (80)	3.3 (80)	3.4 (80)	42.2 (1070)
Average snowfall inches (cm)	5.8 (14)	6.7 (17)	3.6 (9)	0.1 (0)	0 (0)	0 (0)	0 (0)	0 (0)	0 (0)	0.1 (0)	0.9 (2)	3.4 (8)	20.9 (53)
Average precipitation days	13	11	12	11	11	10	10	10	8	8	10	12	126

== Government ==
George Mason is a census-designated place within Fairfax County; therefore, schools, roads, and law enforcement are provided by the county.

=== Board of directors ===
The board is the legislative branch of the community government, led by the president, currently Heather Villavicencio, and the vice-president, currently Julie Stewart.

According to the Association By-Laws, the Board has the power to manage the common property, suspend the rights of defaulting members, exercise the powers and duties not otherwise delegated, declare members of the board who have not attended three or more consecutive meetings to have resigned and fill the resigned's seat, establish policies for the execution of duties, and employ a manager as is deemed necessary.

The duties of the board include keeping record of decisions and presenting it to all Association members present at the annual meeting, oversee all Association employees, assess the value of each lot and inform their owners through written notice, demand the payment to the Association of the assessment, take out liability insurance on Association property, have employees with fiscal responsibility be bonded, maintain the common area, and take action when assessments have not been paid within thirty days of the owner receiving notice.

The board also appoints the members of the Architectural Control Committee and the Nominating Committee, as well as special committees.

=== Representation ===
George Mason is within the Braddock District of Fairfax County. The CDP is also in Virginia's 11th congressional district, currently represented in Congress by Representative James Walkinshaw (D-Annandale). George Mason is represented by David Bulova (D-Fairfax) in the state House of Delegates, and by Chap Petersen (D-Fairfax) in the state Senate.

== Local media ==
George Mason lies within the distribution zone for two national newspapers, the Washington Post, and the Washington Times, as well as for the local Fairfax Times. George Mason is also covered by AOL's Patch service's Fairfax City division.

== Education ==
=== Primary and secondary schools ===
As a part of Fairfax County, George Mason is served by the Fairfax County Public Schools, and private schools. George Mason is served by one high school, Woodson High School, and one middle school, Frost Middle School, both in adjacent Long Branch.

==== Public elementary schools ====
- Olde Creek Elementary School
- Fairfax Villa Elementary School
- Providence Elementary School
- Daniels Run Elementary School

=== Colleges and universities ===
George Mason is home to the main campus of George Mason University, a public liberal arts and research university. The CDP is also near a few other higher education centers, including Missouri State University's Department of Defense and Strategic Studies, and Fairfax University of America.

=== Public libraries ===
George Mason is served by the City of Fairfax Regional Library, a branch of the Fairfax County Public Library.

== Demographics ==
Historical population
Census	Pop.	Note	%±
2010	9,496		—
2020	11,162		17.5%
U.S. Decennial Census; 2010 2020

George Mason was first listed as a census designated place in the 2010 U.S. census.

=== Racial and ethnic composition ===
George Mason CDP, Virginia – Racial and ethnic composition Note: the US Census treats Hispanic/Latino as an ethnic category. This table excludes Latinos from the racial categories and assigns them to a separate category. Hispanics/Latinos may be of any race.
Race / Ethnicity (NH = Non-Hispanic)	Pop 2010	Pop 2020	% 2010	% 2020
White alone (NH)	5,911	4,537	62.25%	40.65%
Black or African American alone (NH)	863	2,186	9.09%	19.58%
Native American or Alaska Native alone (NH)	14	84	0.15%	0.75%
Asian alone (NH)	1,401	1,912	14.75%	17.13%
Native Hawaiian or Pacific Islander alone (NH)	7	0	0.07%	0.00%
Other race alone (NH)	25	46	0.26%	0.41%
Mixed race or Multiracial (NH)	354	540	3.73%	4.84%
Hispanic or Latino (any race)	921	1,857	9.70%	16.64%
Total	9,496	11,162	100.00%	100.00%

=== 2020 census ===
As of the 2020 census, George Mason had a population of 11,162. The median age was 25.1 years. 27.5% of residents were under the age of 18 and 6.6% of residents were 65 years of age or older. For every 100 females there were 101.1 males, and for every 100 females age 18 and over there were 93.1 males age 18 and over.

100.0% of residents lived in urban areas, while 0.0% lived in rural areas.

There were 1,741 households in George Mason, of which 39.5% had children under the age of 18 living in them. Of all households, 64.6% were married-couple households, 12.8% were households with a male householder and no spouse or partner present, and 19.2% were households with a female householder and no spouse or partner present. About 14.2% of all households were made up of individuals and 6.4% had someone living alone who was 65 years of age or older.

There were 1,766 housing units, of which 1.4% were vacant. The homeowner vacancy rate was 0.4% and the rental vacancy rate was 3.2%.

=== Demographic estimates ===
The population density was 4,464.8 inhabitants per square mile (1,712.0/km^{2}). The average housing unit density was 706.4 per square mile (270.9/km^{2}).

The largest ancestry group was the 7.1% who had Irish ancestry, 23.3% spoke a language other than English at home, and 19.1% were born outside the United States, 65.5% of whom were naturalized citizens.

=== Income and poverty ===
The median income for a household in the CDP was $146,985, and the median income for a family was $146,985. 4.1% of the population were military veterans, and 67.4% had a bachelor's degree or higher. In the CDP 5.2% of the population was below the poverty line, including 6.1% of those under the age of 18 and 3.2% of those aged 65 or over, with 7.0% of the population without health insurance.

=== 2010 census ===
The population at the 2010 census was 9,496.
