= Kings Park, Virginia =

- Census-designated place
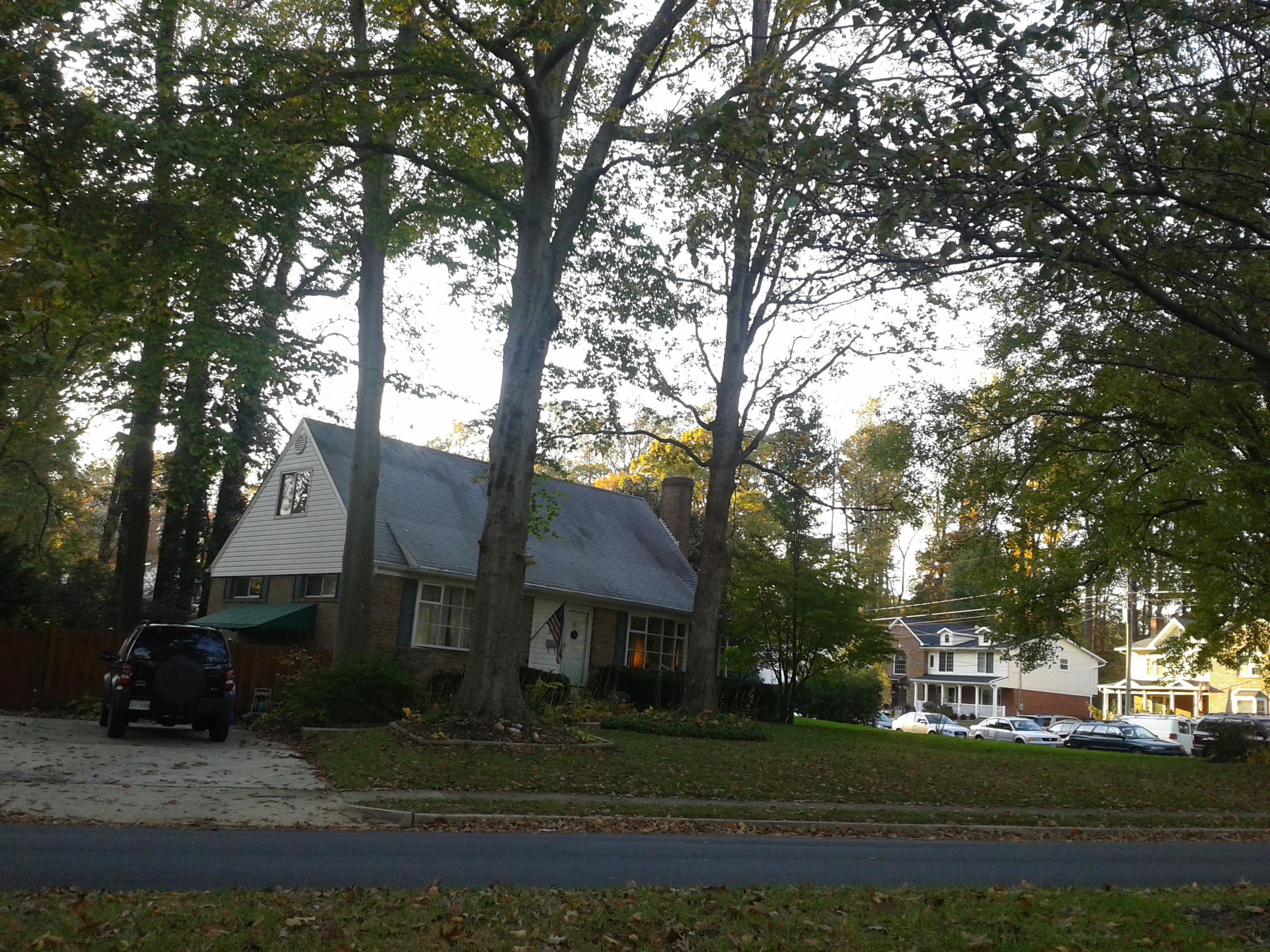
- Houses in Kings Park in 2016

- Location within Northern Virginia Location within Virginia Location within the United States
- Coordinates: 38°48′12″N 77°14′36″W
- Country: United States
- State: Virginia
- County: Fairfax

Area
  - Total: 1.33 sq mi (3.45 km^{2})
  - Land: 1.31 sq mi (3.38 km^{2})
  - Water: 0.023 sq mi (0.06 km^{2})
- Elevation: 345 ft (105 m)

Population (2020)
  - Total: 4,537
  - Density: 3,316/sq mi (1,280.4/km^{2})
- Time zone: UTC−5 (Eastern (EST))
  - Summer (DST): UTC−4 (EDT)
- FIPS code: 51-42664
- GNIS feature ID: 1493167

Kings Park is a census-designated place (CDP) in the eastern United States in Fairfax County, Virginia, southwest of Washington D.C. As of the 2020 census, Kings Park had a population of 4,537.

A suburban community established in early 1960, Kings Park is located a few miles west of the Capital Beltway and Annandale in the Springfield area.

== Geography ==
Kings Park is located southeast of the center of Fairfax County, northwest of Springfield, southwest of Annandale, and southeast of the city of Fairfax. The Kings Park CDP is bordered to the east by Ravensworth and North Springfield, to the north by Wakefield, to the west by Burke, and to the south by West Springfield. It is 1.5 miles (2.4 km) west of the Braddock Road interchange with the Capital Beltway and 17 miles (27 km) southwest of downtown Washington, D.C. The CDP border follows Braddock Road to the north, Accotink Creek to the east, the VRE Manassas Line to the south, and Rolling Road to the west.

According to the U.S. Census Bureau, the Kings Park CDP has a total area of 1.33 square miles (3.45 km^{2}), of which 1.31 square miles (3.38 km^{2}) is land and 0.02 square miles (0.06 km^{2}), or 1.78%, is water.

== Demographics ==
Historical population
Census	Pop.	Note	%±
2010	4,333		—
2020	4,537		4.7%
U.S. Decennial Census; 2010 2020

Kings Park was first listed as a census designated place in the 2010 U.S. census formed from part of West Springfield CDP.

=== Racial and ethnic composition ===
Kings Park CDP, Virginia – Racial and ethnic composition Note: the US Census treats Hispanic/Latino as an ethnic category. This table excludes Latinos from the racial categories and assigns them to a separate category. Hispanics/Latinos may be of any race.
Race / Ethnicity (NH = Non-Hispanic)	Pop 2010	Pop 2020	% 2010	% 2020
White alone (NH)	2,646	2,413	61.07%	53.18%
Black or African American alone (NH)	169	224	3.90%	4.94%
Native American or Alaska Native alone (NH)	6	12	0.14%	0.26%
Asian alone (NH)	694	791	16.02%	17.43%
Native Hawaiian or Pacific Islander alone (NH)	8	11	0.18%	0.24%
Other race alone (NH)	10	27	0.23%	0.60%
Mixed race or Multiracial (NH)	101	264	2.33%	5.82%
Hispanic or Latino (any race)	699	795	16.13%	17.52%
Total	4,333	4,537	100.00%	100.00%

=== 2020 census ===
As of the 2020 census, Kings Park had a population of 4,537. The median age was 39.3 years. 24.8% of residents were under the age of 18 and 15.3% of residents were 65 years of age or older. For every 100 females there were 94.1 males, and for every 100 females age 18 and over there were 94.4 males age 18 and over.

100.0% of residents lived in urban areas, while 0.0% lived in rural areas.

There were 1,439 households in Kings Park, of which 40.7% had children under the age of 18 living in them. Of all households, 67.7% were married-couple households, 10.7% were households with a male householder and no spouse or partner present, and 18.3% were households with a female householder and no spouse or partner present. About 15.0% of all households were made up of individuals and 9.3% had someone living alone who was 65 years of age or older.

There were 1,467 housing units, of which 1.9% were vacant. The homeowner vacancy rate was 0.7% and the rental vacancy rate was 5.0%.

== Education ==
Fairfax County Public Schools operates Kings Park Elementary School in Kings Park CDP.

== See also ==
- Kings Park West
