= Kings Park West, Virginia =

- Census-designated place
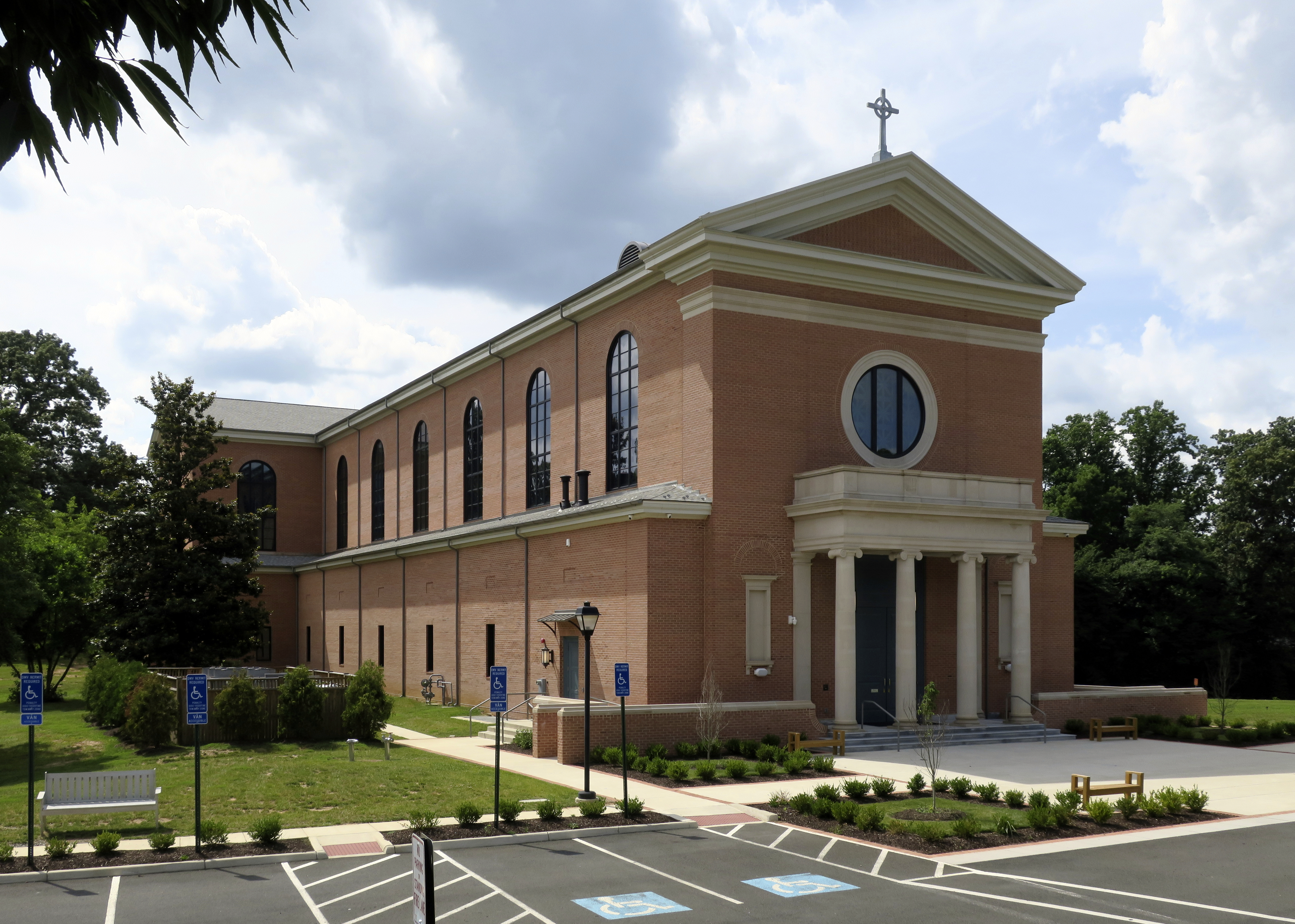
- St. Mary of Sorrows Church on Sideburn Road

- Location within Northern Virginia Location within Virginia Location within the United States
- Coordinates: 38.815°N 77.295°W
- Country: United States
- State: Virginia
- County: Fairfax

Area
  - Total: 3.04 sq mi (7.87 km^{2})
  - Land: 2.97 sq mi (7.70 km^{2})
  - Water: 0.066 sq mi (0.17 km^{2})
- Elevation: 400 ft (120 m)

Population (2020)
  - Total: 13,465
  - Density: 4,431/sq mi (1,710.9/km^{2})
- Time zone: UTC−5 (Eastern (EST))
  - Summer (DST): UTC−4 (EDT)
- ZIP code: 22032 (Fairfax)
- FIPS code: 51-42680
- GNIS feature ID: 2584861

Kings Park West is a census-designated place in the eastern United States, in Fairfax County, Virginia, southwest of Washington, D.C. At the 2020 census the population was 13,465 people

== Geography ==
The CDP is located in central Fairfax County, south of the city of Fairfax. It is bordered to the north by the George Mason CDP, to the northeast by Long Branch, to the southeast by Burke, and to the south by Fairfax Station. The CDP border follows Braddock Road on the north, Guinea Road on the southeast, Zion Drive on the southwest, and State Route 123 (Ox Road) on the west. Downtown Fairfax is two miles (3 km) to the north, and downtown Washington, D.C. is twenty miles (30 km) to the northeast.

According to the U.S Census Bureau, the Kings Park West CDP has a total area of 3.04 square miles (7.87 km^{2}), of which 2.97 square miles (7.70 km^{2}) is land and 0.066 square miles (0.17 km^{2}), or 2.11%, is water.

== History ==
Following the success of its Kings Park development earlier in the decade, Richmarr Construction Corporation started on Kings Park West. Construction began 59 years ago in mid-1967 and the first homes were available in 1968. The development was built in sections, with the final section completed in 1986.

Kings Park West includes Laurel Ridge Elementary School, dating from 1970. On the development's west boundary, Robinson Secondary School opened in 1971.

== Demographics ==
Historical population
Census	Pop.	Note	%±
2010	13,390		—
2020	13,465		0.6%
U.S. Decennial Census; 2010 2020

Kings Park West was first listed as a census designated place in the 2010 U.S. census.

=== Racial and ethnic composition ===
Kings Park West CDP, Virginia – Racial and ethnic composition Note: the US Census treats Hispanic/Latino as an ethnic category. This table excludes Latinos from the racial categories and assigns them to a separate category. Hispanics/Latinos may be of any race.
Race / Ethnicity (NH = Non-Hispanic)	Pop 2010	Pop 2020	% 2010	% 2020
White alone (NH)	8,591	7,905	64.16%	58.71%
Black or African American alone (NH)	675	657	5.04%	4.88%
Native American or Alaska Native alone (NH)	15	17	0.11%	0.13%
Asian alone (NH)	2,275	2,508	16.99%	18.63%
Native Hawaiian or Pacific Islander alone (NH)	21	10	0.16%	0.07%
Other race alone (NH)	38	94	0.28%	0.70%
Mixed race or Multiracial (NH)	430	706	3.21%	5.24%
Hispanic or Latino (any race)	1,345	1,568	10.04%	11.65%
Total	13,390	13,465	100.00%	100.00%

=== 2020 census ===
As of the 2020 census, Kings Park West had a population of 13,465. The median age was 40.0 years. 23.2% of residents were under the age of 18 and 15.8% were 65 years of age or older. For every 100 females there were 97.3 males, and for every 100 females age 18 and over there were 94.9 males age 18 and over.

100.0% of residents lived in urban areas, while 0.0% lived in rural areas.

There were 4,371 households in Kings Park West, of which 39.5% had children under the age of 18 living in them. Of all households, 68.7% were married-couple households, 10.4% were households with a male householder and no spouse or partner present, and 18.5% were households with a female householder and no spouse or partner present. About 12.5% of all households were made up of individuals and 6.9% had someone living alone who was 65 years of age or older.

There were 4,451 housing units, of which 1.8% were vacant. The homeowner vacancy rate was 0.3% and the rental vacancy rate was 3.2%. The population density was 4,429.3 inhabitants per square mile (1,710.9/km^{2}). The average housing unit density was 1,464.1 per square mile (565.6/km^{2}).

=== Demographic estimates ===
Of the residents, 16.7% had German ancestry, 29.8% spoke a language other than English at home, and 22.6% were born outside the United States, 68.6% of whom were naturalized citizens.

=== Income and poverty ===
The median income for a household in the CDP was $162,176, and the median income for a family was $181,202. 10.4% of the population were military veterans, and 64.3% had a bachelor's degree or higher. In the CDP, 8% of the population was below the poverty line, including 3.7% of those under age 18 and 2.3% of those age 65 or over, and 4.6% of the population was without health insurance.

=== 2010 census ===
The population as of the 2010 census was 13,390.

== See also ==
- Kings Park
