= Long Branch, Fairfax County, Virginia =

- Census-designated place
- Location within Northern Virginia Location within Virginia Location within the United States
- Coordinates: 38°49′49″N 77°16′30″W
- Country: United States
- State: Virginia
- County: Fairfax

Area
  - Total: 2.48 sq mi (6.42 km^{2})
  - Land: 2.46 sq mi (6.38 km^{2})
  - Water: 0.012 sq mi (0.03 km^{2})
- Elevation: 360 ft (110 m)

Population (2020)
  - Total: 7,890
  - Density: 3,080/sq mi (1,189.2/km^{2})
- Time zone: UTC−5 (Eastern (EST))
  - Summer (DST): UTC−4 (EDT)
- ZIP code: 22032
- FIPS code: 51-46760
- GNIS feature ID: 2584867

Long Branch is a census-designated place in Fairfax County, Virginia, United States, bordering the city of Fairfax. The population as of the 2010 census was 7,593.

== Geography ==
The CDP lies mainly in the watershed of Long Branch, an Accotink Creek tributary. The CDP is bounded by Guinea Road to the east, Braddock Road to the south, Little River Turnpike (Virginia State Route 236) to the north, the Fairfax city limits to the northwest, and Burke Station Road to the west. Neighboring census-designated places are Mantua to the north, Wakefield to the east, Burke to the south, Kings Park West to the southwest, and George Mason to the west. According to the U.S. Census Bureau, the Long Branch CDP has a total area of 2.5 square miles (6.4 km^{2}), of which 0.01 square miles (0.03 km^{2}), or 0.50%, is water. A larger version of the CDP was delineated in 1970 when the CDP had a population of 21,634 and a land area of 6.8 square miles (18 km^{2}).

C.G. Woodson High School, Frost Middle School, Olde Creek Elementary and Little Run Elementary are located here.

== Demographics ==
Historical population
Census	Pop.	Note	%±
1970	21,634		—
2010	7,593		—
2020	7,890		3.9%
U.S. Decennial Census; 2010 2020

Long Branch was first listed as a census designated place in the 2010 U.S. census.

Long Branch CDP, Virginia – Racial and ethnic composition Note: the US Census treats Hispanic/Latino as an ethnic category. This table excludes Latinos from the racial categories and assigns them to a separate category. Hispanics/Latinos may be of any race.
Race / Ethnicity (NH = Non-Hispanic)	Pop 2010	Pop 2020	% 2010	% 2020
White alone (NH)	5,014	4,464	66.03%	56.58%
Black or African American alone (NH)	187	246	2.46%	3.12%
Native American or Alaska Native alone (NH)	16	3	0.21%	0.04%
Asian alone (NH)	1,646	2,024	21.68%	25.65%
Native Hawaiian or Pacific Islander alone (NH)	3	3	0.04%	0.04%
Other race alone (NH)	26	32	0.34%	0.41%
Mixed race or Multiracial (NH)	146	353	1.92%	4.47%
Hispanic or Latino (any race)	555	765	7.31%	9.70%
Total	7,593	7,890	100.00%	100.00%
