= Wakefield, Fairfax County, Virginia =

- Census-designated place
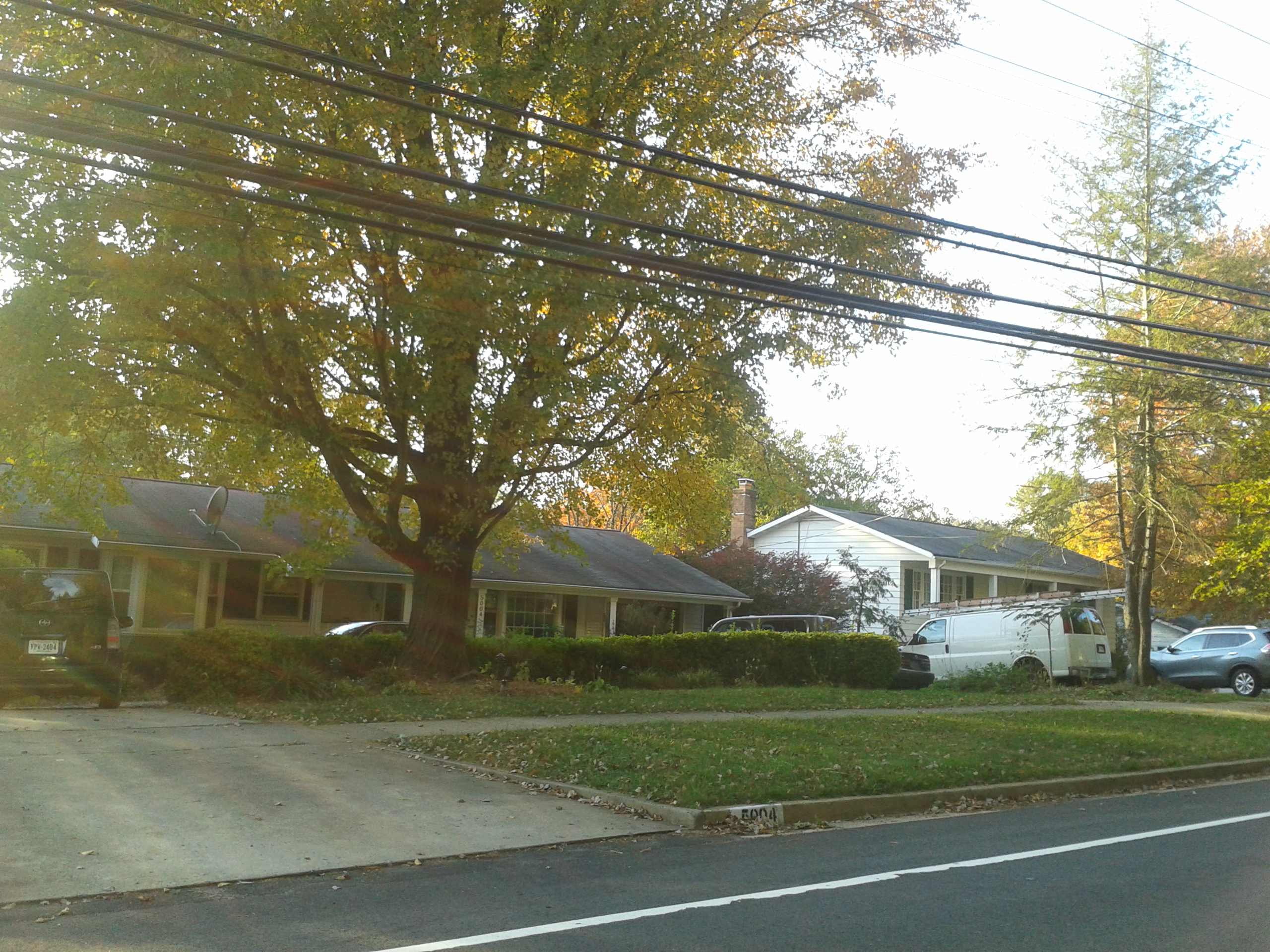
- Houses on Wakefield Chapel Road, October 2016

- Location within Northern Virginia Location within Virginia Location within the United States
- Coordinates: 38°49′28″N 77°14′34″W
- Country: United States
- State: Virginia
- County: Fairfax

Area
  - Total: 3.80 sq mi (9.85 km^{2})
  - Land: 3.77 sq mi (9.76 km^{2})
  - Water: 0.035 sq mi (0.09 km^{2})
- Elevation: 300 ft (91 m)

Population (2010)
  - Total: 11,805
  - Density: 2,991/sq mi (1,154.7/km^{2})
- Time zone: UTC−5 (Eastern (EST))
  - Summer (DST): UTC−4 (EDT)
- ZIP code: 22003
- FIPS code: 51-82371
- GNIS feature ID: 2584933

Wakefield is a census-designated place in Fairfax County, Virginia, United States. The population as of the 2010 census was 11,275. The current Wakefield area was built in the 1950-60's.

== Geography ==
Bounded by the Capital Beltway, Little River Turnpike, Guinea Road and Braddock Road, the CDP draws much of its identity from Wakefield Chapel, an 1899-built Methodist church that is now owned by the county Park Authority and still available as a chapel. Wakefield Chapel Road bisects the CDP, and Wakefield Park Recreation Center and several subdivisions bear the Wakefield name. Northern Virginia Community College's Annandale Campus is also here, as is the historic Oak Hill Mansion.

Neighboring communities are Mantua to the northwest, Woodburn to the north, Annandale to the east, North Springfield to the southeast, Ravensworth and Kings Park to the south, Burke to the southwest, and Long Branch to the west. The city of Fairfax is 3 miles (5 km) to the west, and downtown Washington, D.C. is 15 miles (24 km) to the northeast. Its borders are formed by Guinea Road to the west, Braddock Road to the south, Interstate 495 to the east, and Little River Turnpike to the north.

According to the U.S. Census Bureau, the total area of the Wakefield CDP is 3.80 square miles (9.85 km^{2}), of which 3.77 square miles (9.76 km^{2}) is land and 0.03 square miles (0.09 km^{2}), or 0.89%, is water.

== Demographics ==
Historical population
| Census | Pop. | Note | %± |
|---|---|---|---|
| 2010 | 18,275 | | — |
| 2020 | 11,805 | | −35.4% |
U.S. Decennial Census; 2010 2020

Wakefield was first listed as a census designated place in the 2010 U.S. census formed from part of Annandale CDP and West Springfield CDP.

Wakefield CDP, Virginia – Racial and ethnic composition Note: the US Census treats Hispanic/Latino as an ethnic category. This table excludes Latinos from the racial categories and assigns them to a separate category. Hispanics/Latinos may be of any race.
| Race / Ethnicity (NH = Non-Hispanic) | Pop 2010 | Pop 2020 | % 2010 | % 2020 |
|---|---|---|---|---|
| White alone (NH) | 8,064 | 7,537 | 71.52% | 63.85% |
| Black or African American alone (NH) | 247 | 372 | 2.19% | 3.15% |
| Native American or Alaska Native alone (NH) | 13 | 9 | 0.12% | 0.08% |
| Asian alone (NH) | 1,861 | 2,199 | 16.51% | 18.63% |
| Native Hawaiian or Pacific Islander alone (NH) | 7 | 3 | 0.06% | 0.03% |
| Other race alone (NH) | 24 | 89 | 0.21% | 0.75% |
| Mixed race or Multiracial (NH) | 238 | 647 | 2.11% | 5.48% |
| Hispanic or Latino (any race) | 821 | 949 | 7.28% | 8.04% |
| Total | 11,275 | 11,805 | 100.00% | 100.00% |

== Education ==
Fairfax County Public Schools operates area public schools. Public schools within the CDP include:

- Canterbury Woods Elementary School (Annandale postal address)
- Wakefield Forest Elementary School

Holy Spirit School, of the Roman Catholic Diocese of Arlington, is in Wakefield CDP. It has an Annandale postal address.

Northern Virginia Community College has the Annandale Campus within the CDP limits.
