= Woodburn, Fairfax County, Virginia =

Unincorporated community in Virginia, US

- Census-designated place
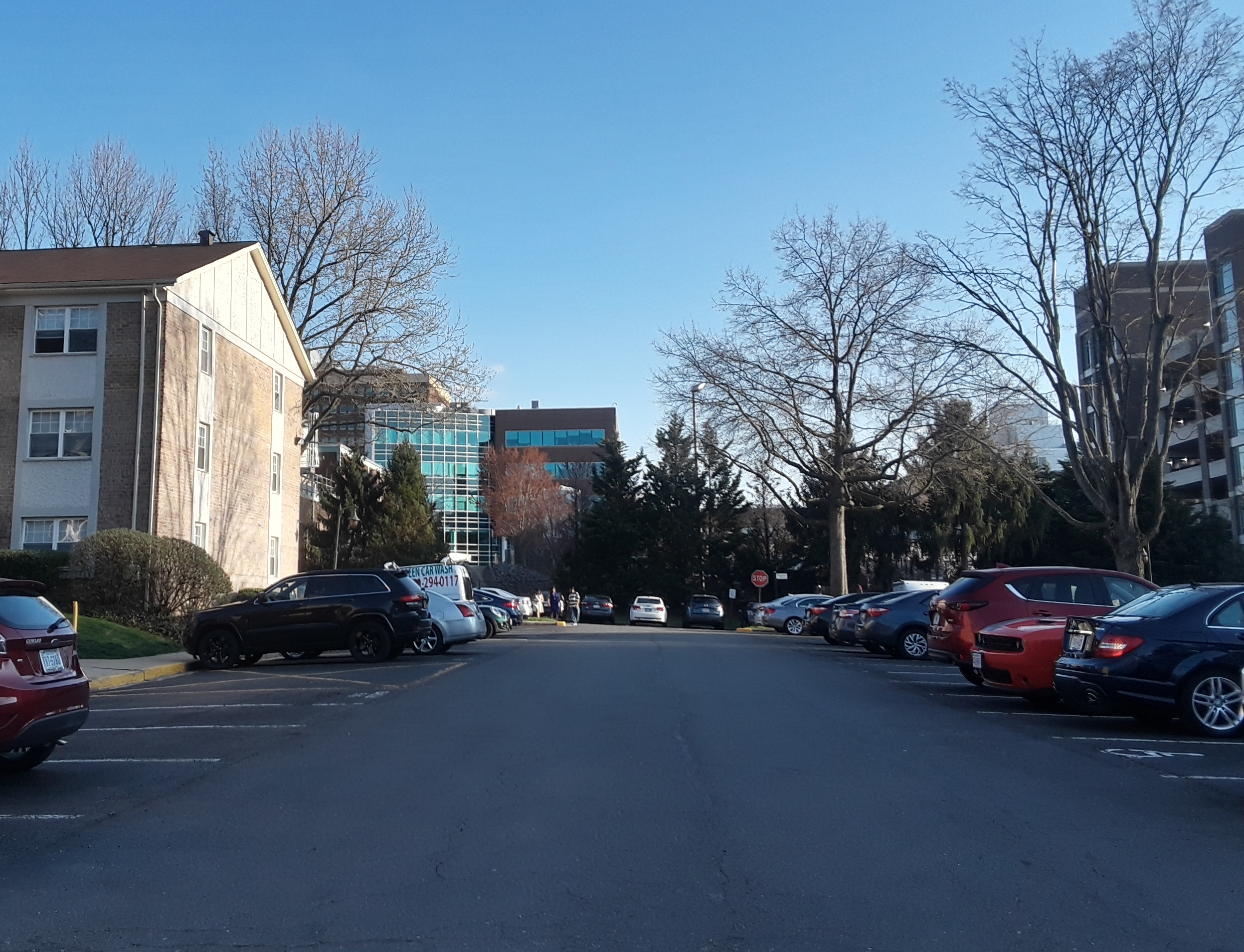
- Apartment complex in Woodburn; the back of Inova Fairfax Hospital can be seen in the near distance

- Location within Northern Virginia Location within Virginia Location within the United States
- Coordinates: 38°50′55″N 77°14′8″W
- Country: United States
- State: Virginia
- County: Fairfax

Area
  - Total: 2.80 sq mi (7.25 km^{2})
  - Land: 2.78 sq mi (7.19 km^{2})
  - Water: 0.019 sq mi (0.05 km^{2})
- Elevation: 290 ft (88 m)

Population (2020)
  - Total: 8,797
  - Density: 3,054/sq mi (1,179.1/km^{2})
- Time zone: UTC−5 (Eastern (EST))
  - Summer (DST): UTC−4 (EDT)
- ZIP codes: 22003, 22031
- FIPS code: 51-87333
- GNIS feature ID: 2584938

Woodburn is a census-designated place in Fairfax County, Virginia, United States. The population as of the 2010 census was 8,480.

== Geography ==
Bounded by the Capital Beltway (I-495) to the east, Arlington Boulevard (US 50) to the north, Prosperity Avenue to the west, and Little River Turnpike (SR 236) to the south, the CDP is home to Inova Fairfax Hospital. Neighboring communities are Annandale to the east, Wakefield to the south, Mantua to the west, Merrifield to the north, and West Falls Church at the northeast corner of Woodburn. The city of Fairfax is 4 miles (6 km) to the west by either US 50 or SR 236, and downtown Washington, D.C. is 12 miles (19 km) to the east.

According to the U.S. Census Bureau, the Woodburn CDP has a total area of 2.80 square miles (7.25 km^{2}), of which 2.78 square miles (7.19 km^{2}) is land and 0.02 square miles (0.05 km^{2}), or 0.75%, is water.

== Demographics ==
Historical population
Census	Pop.	Note	%±
2010	8,480		—
2020	8,797		3.7%
U.S. Decennial Census; 2010 2020

Woodburn was first listed as a census designated place in the 2010 U.S. census formed from part of Annandale CDP.

Woodburn CDP, Virginia – Racial and ethnic composition Note: the US Census treats Hispanic/Latino as an ethnic category. This table excludes Latinos from the racial categories and assigns them to a separate category. Hispanics/Latinos may be of any race.
Race / Ethnicity (NH = Non-Hispanic)	Pop 2010	Pop 2020	% 2010	% 2020
White alone (NH)	4,689	4,164	55.29%	47.33%
Black or African American alone (NH)	510	540	6.01%	6.14%
Native American or Alaska Native alone (NH)	16	13	0.19%	0.15%
Asian alone (NH)	1,608	1,906	18.96%	21.67%
Native Hawaiian or Pacific Islander alone (NH)	5	4	0.06%	0.05%
Other race alone (NH)	25	71	0.29%	0.81%
Mixed race or Multiracial (NH)	251	540	2.96%	6.14%
Hispanic or Latino (any race)	1,376	1,559	16.23%	17.72%
Total	8,480	8,797	100.00%	100.00%
