= Annandale, Virginia =

Census-designated place in Virginia, US

- Census-designated place
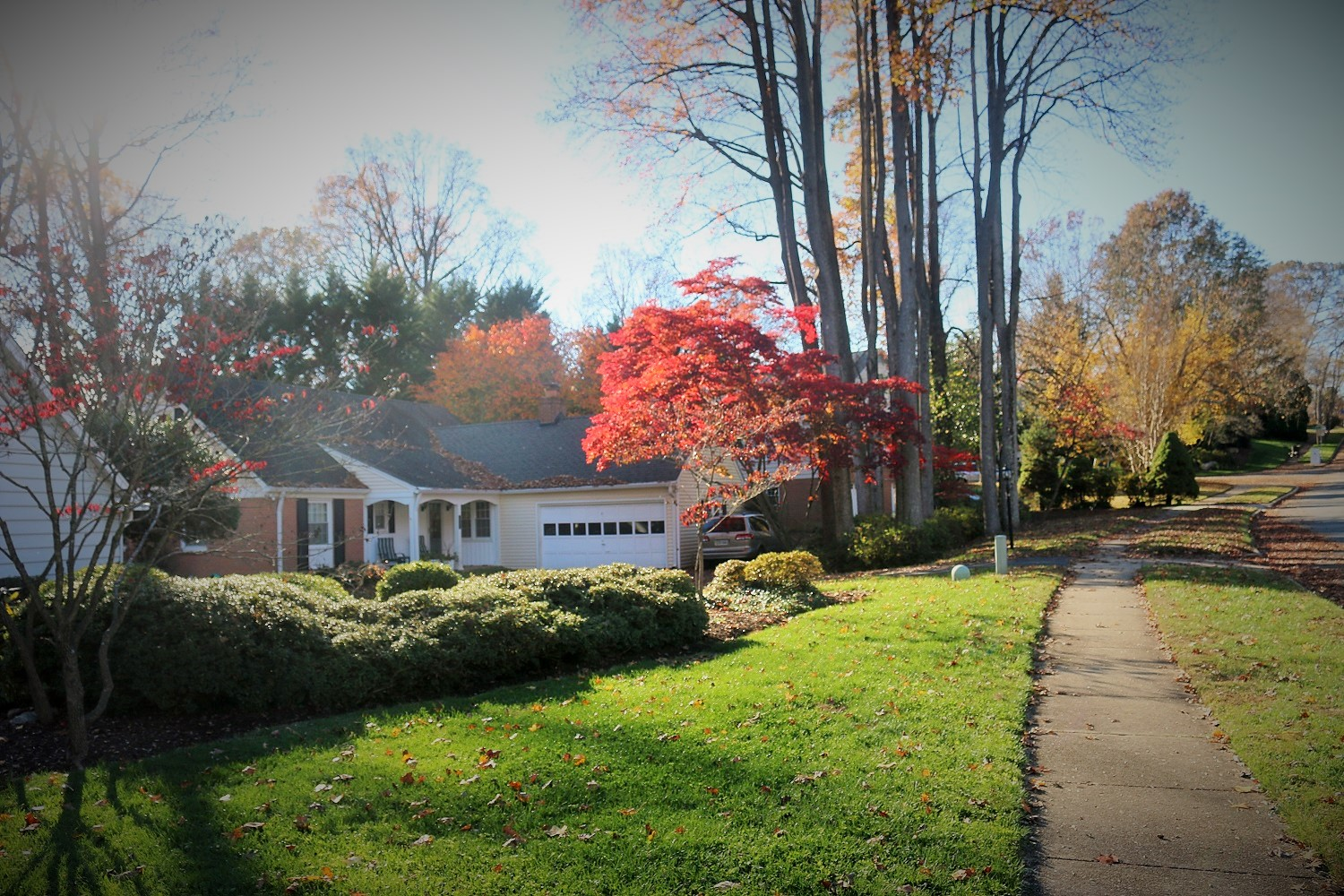
- Suburban Annandale in 2015

- Flag

- Location of Annandale in Fairfax County, Virginia

- Location within Northern Virginia Location within Virginia Location within the United States
- Coordinates: 38°50′3″N 77°12′41″W
- Country: United States
- State: Virginia
- County: Fairfax
- Settled: 1685
- Named for: Annandale, United Kingdom

Area
  - Total: 7.86 sq mi (20.4 km^{2})
  - Land: 7.86 sq mi (20.4 km^{2})
  - Water: 0 sq mi (0.0 km^{2})
- Elevation: 360 ft (110 m)

Population (2020)
  - Total: 43,363
  - Density: 5,516.9/sq mi (2,130.1/km^{2})
- Time zone: UTC−5 (Eastern (EST))
  - Summer (DST): UTC−4 (EDT)
- ZIP Code: 22003
- Area codes: 703, 571
- FIPS code: 51-01912
- GNIS feature ID: 1492474
- Website: www.annandale.va.us

Annandale (/ˈænəndeɪl/) is a census-designated place (CDP) in Fairfax County, Virginia, United States. The population of the CDP was 43,363 as of the 2020 United States census. It is home to the oldest and largest branch of the Northern Virginia Community College system, and to one of the D.C. area's Koreatowns.

== History ==
When Europeans arrived in the 17th century, the area around Annandale, which became Fairfax County, was inhabited by an Algonquian-speaking sub-group called the Taux, also known as the Doeg or Dogue.

In 1685, an Englishman, Col. William H. Fitzhugh, purchased over 24,000 acres (37.5 square miles) of wilderness in the area and converted it into one of the largest tobacco plantations in Northern Virginia. It stretched from current day Fairfax City to Springfield and Falls Church and south to Pohick Church. Fitzhugh's descendants later named it "Ravensworth." For over six generations, the Fitzhugh family farmed at Ravensworth and slowly sold off portions of the land.

In 1830, the community of Annandale was named by a Scottish settler, after the town named Annan located at the mouth of the River Annan. Annandale followed nearby Dumfries to become the second place in Dumfriesshire to become the name of a settlement in Virginia. In 1806, the Little River Turnpike (now Virginia State Route 236) had been completed through the community, connecting it with Alexandria and Fairfax. In 1808, the Columbia Pike (now Virginia State Route 244) was built, connecting the District of Columbia with Little River Turnpike in what is now Annandale. The first businessman to locate in Annandale was William Garges, who built a blacksmith shop and a livery stable at the intersection of Columbia Pike, Little River Turnpike and Backlick Road, which would become the center of town. Garges became the first postmaster at the Annandale Post Office, which opened in 1837. Small farms and businesses grew up around the town and its first church, the Annandale Methodist Chapel, was built in 1846.

=== American Civil War ===
The American Civil War touched Annandale several times between 1861 and 1865. U.S. troops defending the vicinity of Washington, D.C., frequently took positions in and around the town. Confederate forces probing those defenses skirmished with them from time to time. The Methodist Chapel, which had fallen into disrepair during the war, was dismantled by Union troops to obtain construction materials in 1863.

After the war, farmers and businessmen returned to their pursuits and dairy farming began to grow in Fairfax County. Small communities continued to develop or grow near railroad stations and the dairy farms. Residents built stores, churches, and schools for their communities.

=== 20th century ===
Jumbo supermarket in Annandale, late 1970s

By 1925, Fairfax County contained more dairy farms than any other county in Virginia. In the 1930s and 1940s, work in the area for the federal government grew as President Franklin D. Roosevelt implemented the New Deal and the United States entered World War II.

After World War II, growth continued, with housing developments in suburbs like Annandale accompanied by businesses, schools, and roads to support the new residents. The suburbs became “bedroom communities” with many residents commuting to work in Washington or surrounding small cities. That trend has continued to today with further growth and many residents now commuting to work in Northern Virginia as well as in and around Washington.

== Geography ==
Annandale is located at 38°50′3″N 77°12′41″W (38.834134, −77.211277). Annandale is mostly traversed by the Capital Beltway (Interstate 495) and Little River Turnpike (Virginia State Route 236). The center of town is considered to be where Little River Turnpike, Columbia Pike, and Backlick Road meet, around two miles (3.2 km) east of Interstate 495 on Little River Turnpike.

Annandale is bordered to the north by West Falls Church, to the east by Lake Barcroft and Lincolnia, to the south by North Springfield, and to the west by Wakefield and Woodburn. The CDP border follows Braddock Road to the south, Interstate 495 to the west, Holmes Run and Arlington Boulevard (U.S. Route 50) to the north, and Sleepy Hollow Road, Columbia Pike, and Little River Turnpike to the east.

According to the United States Census Bureau, the CDP has a total area of 7.86 square miles (20.4 km^{2}), all of it land. The area is part of the coastal plain located just east of the Fall Line separating the coastal plain of Virginia from the Piedmont. It is characterized by rolling hills, stream valleys, and heavy red clay soils.

The Annandale region is bisected by Accotink Creek, which in Colonial times was a primary link for ocean-going ships that would load tobacco and other goods where Little River Turnpike - Annandale's oldest road and the first toll road in America - crosses it. With the construction of the Springfield Dam in 1918, Lake Accotink was created to serve as a water source for World War I-era Army Camp A.A. Humphreys (now named Fort Belvoir). In 1960, when the lake was no longer needed by the Army, the Fairfax County Park Authority leased the land and finally bought the site in 1965. Today, Lake Accotink is a popular recreation area with walking, hiking and biking trails, fishing and boat rentals.

Also along Accotink Creek runs the Gerry Connolly Cross County Trail which provides uninterrupted hiking, biking, running and cross-country skiing for 20 miles (32 km) in Annandale. The trail meanders through parks and forests filled with deer, fox, geese and numerous species of native birds. In the spring, Accotink Creek is stocked with trout, and fishermen are often seen wading in its waters.

== Demographics ==
Historical population
Census	Pop.	Note	%±
1970	27,405		—
1980	49,524		80.7%
1990	50,975		2.9%
2000	54,994		7.9%
2010	41,008		−25.4%
2020	43,363		5.7%
U.S. Decennial Census; 1950 1960 1970; 1980 1990 2000; 2010

For the 2010 U.S. census, Wakefield CDP and Woodburn CDP were carved out of Annandale's territory.

=== Racial and ethnic composition ===
Annandale CDP, Virginia – Racial and ethnic composition Note: the US Census treats Hispanic/Latino as an ethnic category. This table excludes Latinos from the racial categories and assigns them to a separate category. Hispanics/Latinos may be of any race.
Race / Ethnicity (NH = Non-Hispanic)	Pop 1980	Pop 1990	Pop 2000	Pop 2010	Pop 2020	% 1980	% 1990	% 2000	% 2010	% 2020
White alone (NH)	43,852	42,154	31,453	14,986	12,719	88.55%	82.70%	57.19%	36.54%	29.33%
Black or African American alone (NH)	1,341	1,946	3,128	3,408	3,885	2.71%	3.82%	5.69%	8.31%	8.96%
Native American or Alaska Native alone (NH)	104	108	114	80	53	0.21%	0.21%	0.21%	0.20%	0.12%
Asian alone (NH)	1,926	2,202	10,623	10,050	10,611	3.89%	4.32%	19.32%	24.51%	24.47%
Native Hawaiian or Pacific Islander alone (NH)	14	20	39	43	14	0.03%	0.04%	0.07%	0.10%	0.03%
Other race alone (NH)	407	1,023	147	107	193	0.82%	2.01%	0.27%	0.26%	0.45%
Mixed race or Multiracial (NH)	x	x	1,524	1,008	1,618	x	x	2.77%	2.46%	3.73%
Hispanic or Latino (any race)	1,880	3,522	7,966	11,326	14,270	3.80%	6.91%	14.49%	27.62%	32.91%
Total	49,524	50,975	54,994	41,008	43,363	100.00%	100.00%	100.00%	100.00%	100.00%

=== 2020 census ===
As of the 2020 census, Annandale had a population of 43,363. The median age was 38.4 years. 22.8% of residents were under the age of 18 and 15.4% of residents were 65 years of age or older. For every 100 females there were 97.0 males, and for every 100 females age 18 and over there were 95.0 males age 18 and over.

The sharp decrease in population from 54,994 in 2000 was due to the splitting off of the CDP's western portion to form the Wakefield and Woodburn CDPs.

100.0% of residents lived in urban areas, while 0.0% lived in rural areas.

There were 13,924 households in Annandale, of which 36.6% had children under the age of 18 living in them. Of all households, 51.8% were married-couple households, 17.0% were households with a male householder and no spouse or partner present, and 25.7% were households with a female householder and no spouse or partner present. About 19.8% of all households were made up of individuals and 8.3% had someone living alone who was 65 years of age or older.

There were 14,367 housing units, of which 3.1% were vacant. The homeowner vacancy rate was 0.9% and the rental vacancy rate was 3.3%.

Racial composition as of the 2020 census
Race	Number	Percent
White	14,203	32.8%
Black or African American	3,963	9.1%
American Indian and Alaska Native	526	1.2%
Asian	10,658	24.6%
Native Hawaiian and Other Pacific Islander	22	0.1%
Some other race	8,046	18.6%
Two or more races	5,945	13.7%
Hispanic or Latino (of any race)	14,270	32.9%

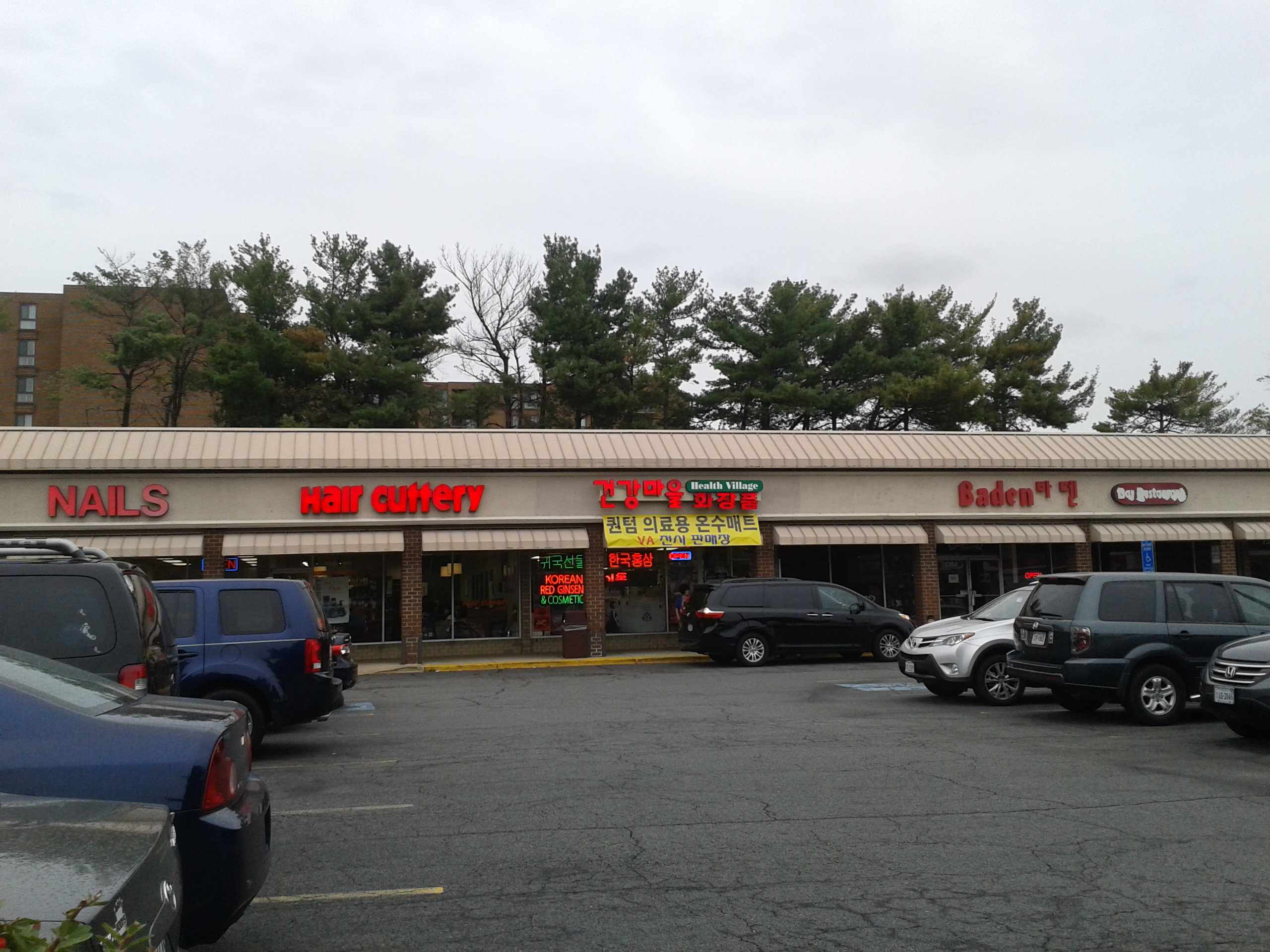
Annandale has several Korean businesses

=== Income ===
The median income for a household in the community was $96,533, and the median income for a family was $108,079. Males had median earnings of $42,552 versus $30,979 for females. The community's per capita income was $40,361. About 6.9% of families and 9.8% of the population were below the poverty line, including 14.6% of those under age 18 and 9.0% of those age 65 or over.

=== Ancestry ===
According to the Demographic Statistical Atlas of the United States, as of 2018, the largest ancestry groups were:

- 9.5% Salvadoran
- 9.0% African-American
- 8.9% Vietnamese
- 9.1% Bolivian
- 6.8% German
- 6.2% Korean
- 5.8% Irish
- 4.8% English
- 3.0% Guatemalan
- 3.0% Italian
- 2.8% Honduran
- 2.8% American
- 2.7% Arab
- 2.4% Filipino
- 2.1% Chinese
- 1.9% Pakistani
- 1.6% Mexican
- 1.4% Polish
- 1.2% Indian
- 1.2% Peruvian
- 1.1% Scottish

== Economy ==
=== Corporate presence ===
- DynCorp Headquarters (uses a McLean, Virginia postal address)
- Noblis Headquarters (uses a Reston, Virginia postal address)

Former

- Ensco Headquarters (used a Falls Church, Virginia postal address)

=== Koreatown ===
Downtown Annandale is also referred to by some as Koreatown as there were roughly 929 South Korean-owned businesses as of 2006 and 67 South Korean-owned restaurants as of July 1, 2010, operating in the Washington Metropolitan Area, according to the GIANT Directory for South Korean-owned and Korean-American businesses. They were developed beginning in the 1990s by Korean immigrants to the region. The influx of Koreans to Northern Virginia and Annandale can be traced to the ease of commute into the District of Columbia for federal employees, the quality of its schools, and even the opening of an office of the Fairfax County Economic Development Authority in Seoul. Most of the businesses and restaurants initially catered primarily to South Korean expatriates, but some had a diverse clientele from the beginning. In the past, county officials sought to make Annandale more diverse by encouraging Korean businesses to include English in their signs., Fairfax County is home to nearly 40,000 Koreans and is seen by many Washingtonians as a destination for karaoke, BBQ, and bingsu. There are now multiple generations of Korean-American businesses and restaurants in Annandale and they attract a broad demographic of customers.

== Local government ==
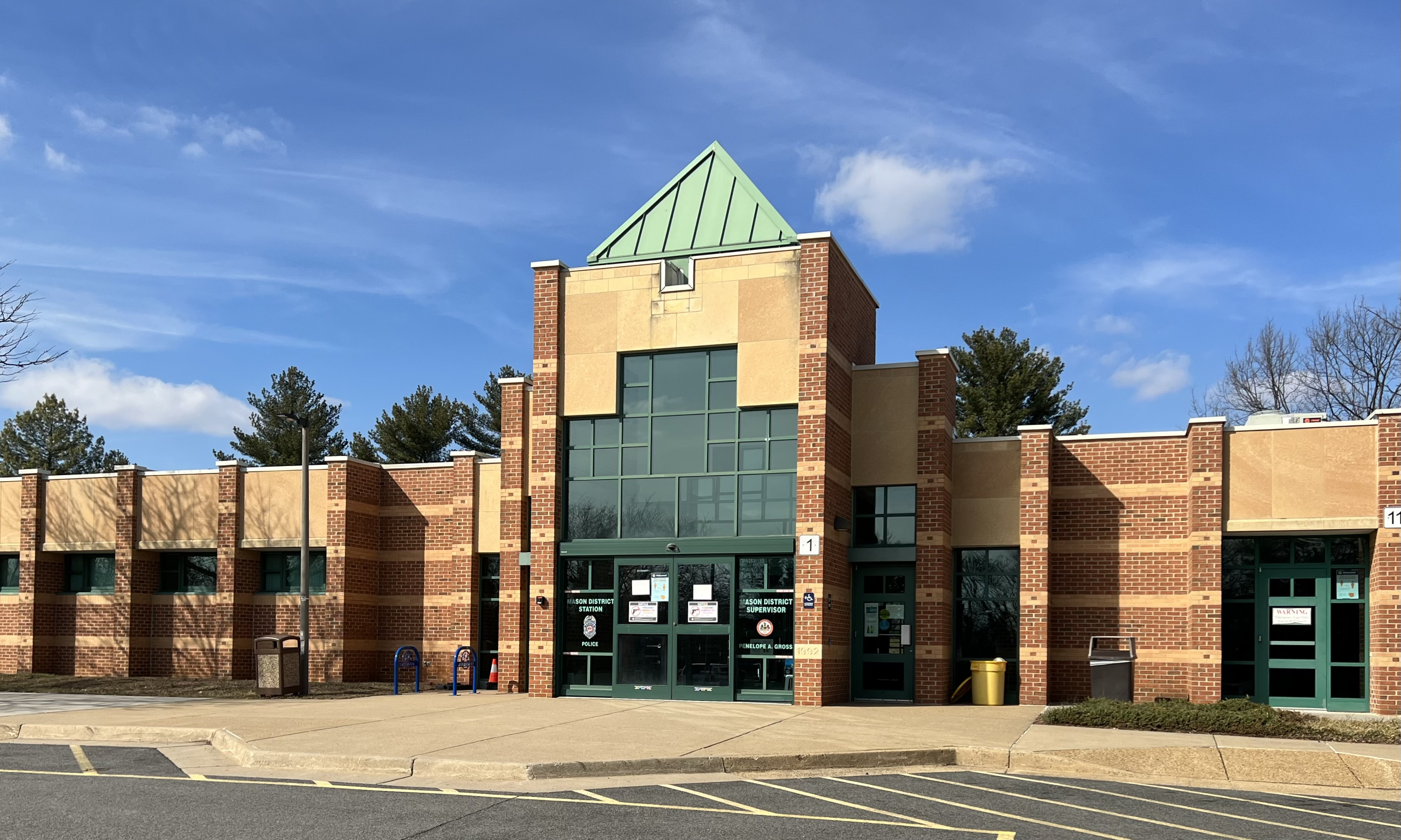
Mason District Government Center

Fairfax County (which includes Annandale) operates under the urban county executive form of government. The powers of government are vested in an elected Board of Supervisors consisting of nine members elected by district, plus a chairman elected at large. The Annandale CDP lies almost entirely within the Mason District, with one small portion to the southwest lying within the Braddock District.

== Education ==
=== Public schools ===
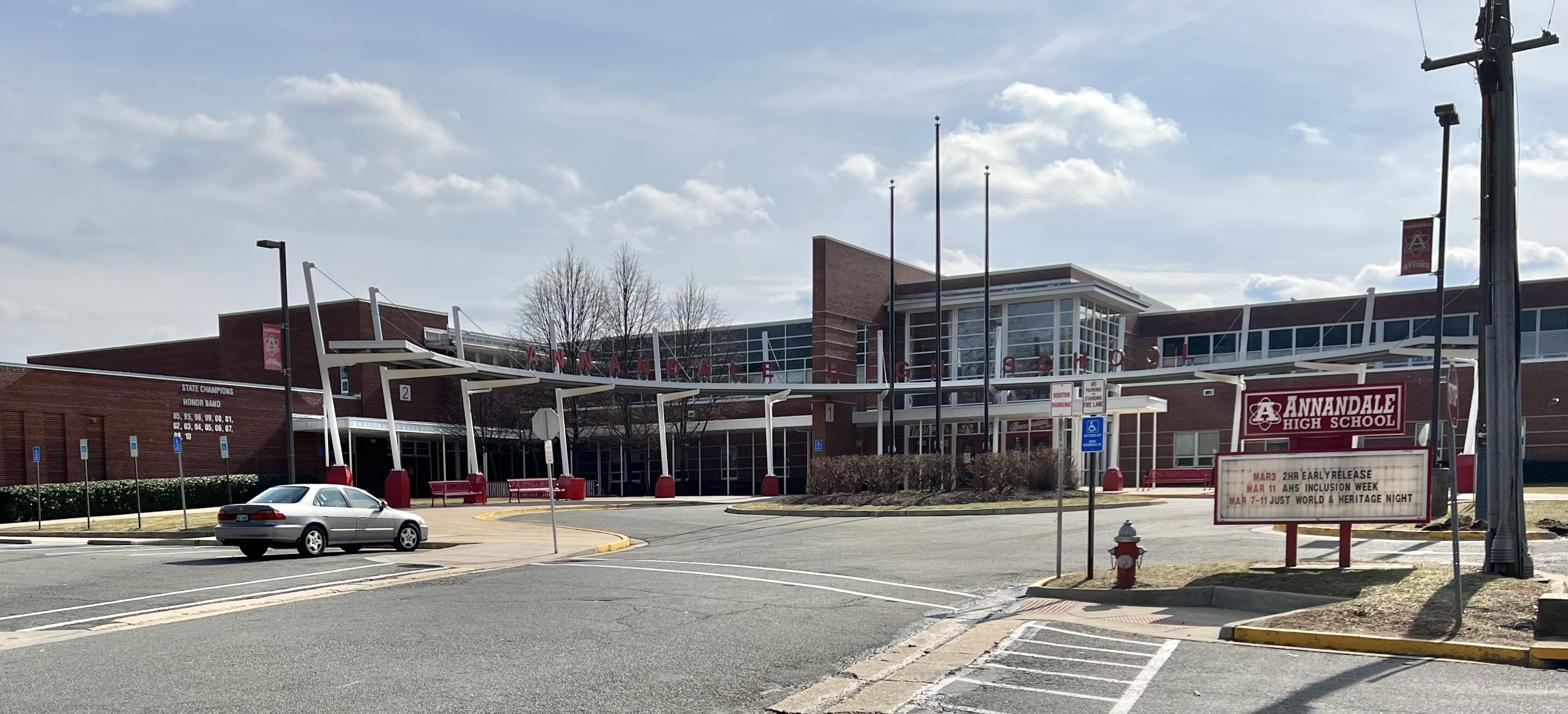
Annandale High School

Educational institutions in Annandale include facilities operated by the Fairfax County Public Schools. Annandale High School, founded in 1954, is the main area public high school although Thomas Jefferson High School for Science and Technology, Falls Church High School, Woodson High School, and Justice High School also take in small portions of Annandale. Other schools include Edgar Allan Poe Middle School, Annandale Terrace Elementary School, Braddock Elementary School, Belvedere Elementary School, Glasgow Middle School, Woodburn Elementary School, Camelot Elementary School, Columbia Elementary School, Canterbury Woods Elementary School (Wakefield CDP), and Wakefield Forest Elementary School.

Annandale High School has one of the area's few International Baccalaureate Degree programs. Ensembles within the school's choral program have performed at the Kennedy Center in Washington, D.C., as well as many European venues.

=== Private schools ===
Private Catholic schools in the Annandale area, of the Roman Catholic Diocese of Arlington, include Holy Spirit Catholic School (Wakefield CDP), St. Ambrose Catholic School, and St. Michael's Catholic School.

Private schools located in Annandale include Grasshopper Green, Kenwood School, Hope Montessori School, Montessori School of Northern Virginia, Oakwood School, Pinecrest School, and Westminster School.

=== Colleges and universities ===
The oldest and largest branch of the Northern Virginia Community College system is also located within Annandale and was founded in 1965. A focal point of "NOVA", a commonly used nickname of the community college, is the Richard J. Ernst Community Cultural Center which is a 66,000-square-foot (6,100 m^{2}) facility containing a 525-seat, state-of-the-art theater with satellite downlink and video projection capability, an 11,000-square-foot (1,000 m^{2}) gymnasium/exhibition hall, a light-filled atrium entrance and a two-story art gallery. The college opened with 761 students, and today has more than 75,000 students and 2,600 faculty and staff members, and has six permanent campus sites across Northern Virginia. The student body consists of people from more than 180 countries.

The campus, which has an Annandale postal address, is part of Wakefield. The bureau defined the campus as being in the Annandale CDP for the 1990 United States census and the 2000 United States census, but in 2010 separated the area with the NVCC campus into a new CDP.

== Public services ==
=== Fire department ===
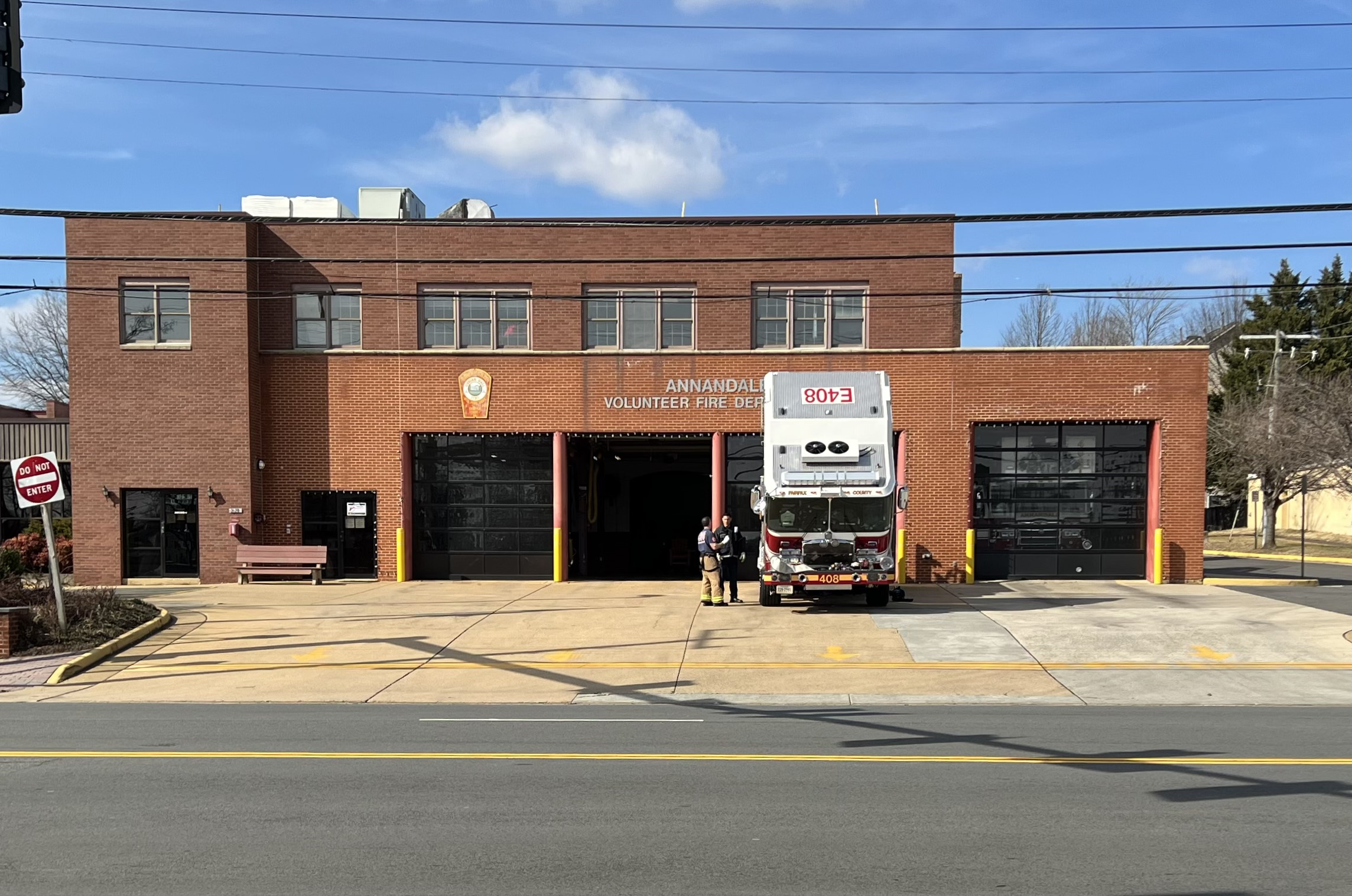
Fire Station No. 8

The Fairfax County Fire & Rescue department staffs two stations in Annandale; downtown at Station 8, and in West Annandale, at Station 23, that operate within Annandale and surrounding areas within and around the county when needed. The Annandale Volunteer Fire Department (AVFD), a non-profit organization started in 1940, owns and maintains stations 8 and 23. Through a partnership with Fairfax County, both stations are now staffed full-time with career personnel employed by Fairfax County. Volunteers also provide regular emergency services at both stations. Vehicles owned by AVFD display "Annandale Volunteer Fire Department" markings and include Medic 408, Medic 408B, Ambulance 408, Engine 408, Canteen 408, & Medic 423. Engine 423, Light and Air 423, Tower 408 and BC404 are owned by Fairfax County and marked as such. However, all vehicles have some type of "Annandale" on the exterior.

=== Public libraries ===
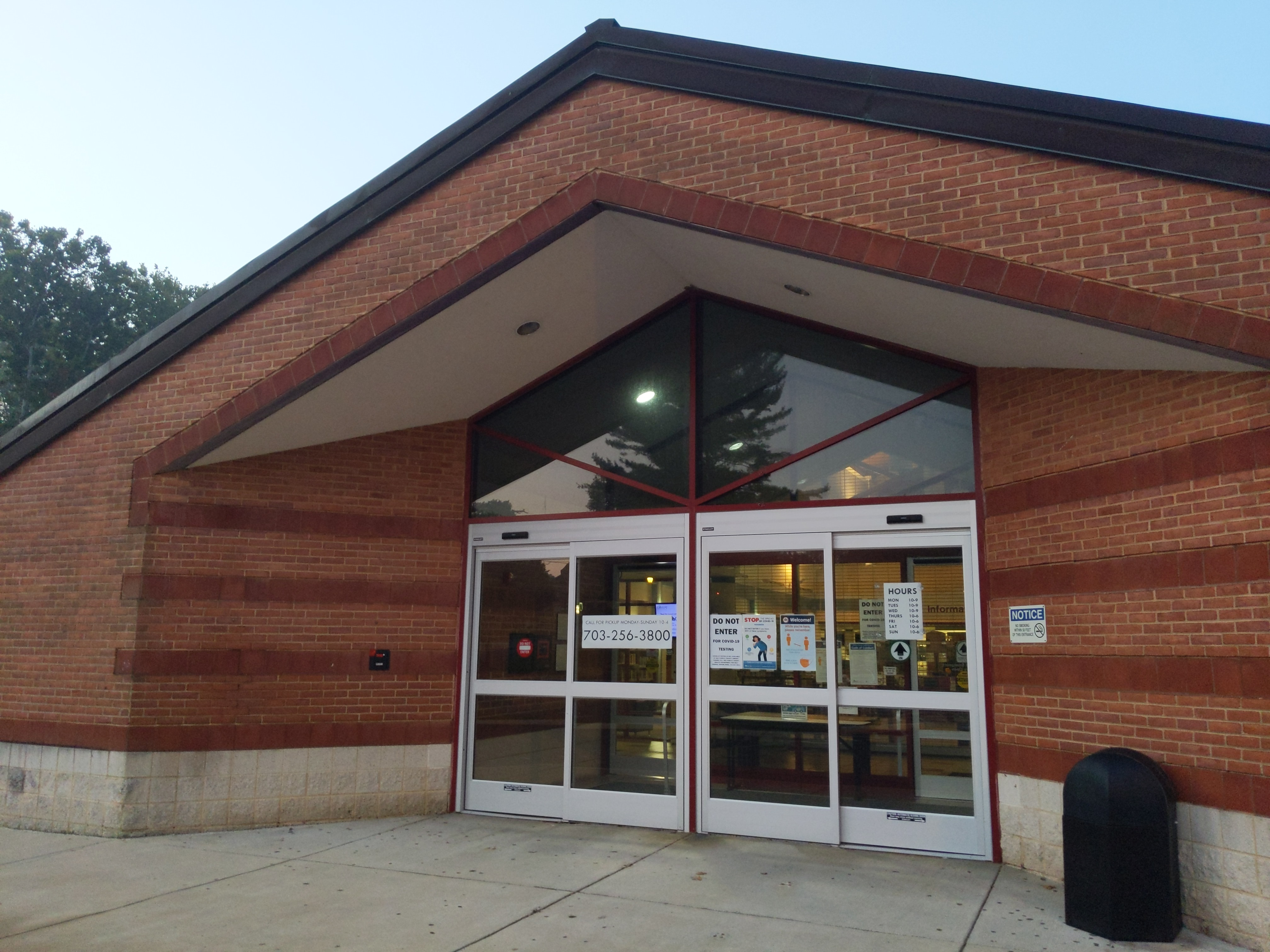
George Mason Regional Library

Fairfax County Public Library operates the George Mason Regional Library in the CDP.

=== Recreational centers ===
The Audrey Moore RECenter (originally known as the Wakefield Recreation Center when it opened in 1977), located in Wakefield Park (now within the Wakefield CDP), houses an indoor pool measuring 76,000 square feet (7,100 m^{2}) in size and a 50m x 25yd pool. The REC center offers more than 40 group fitness classes each week.

=== Parks ===
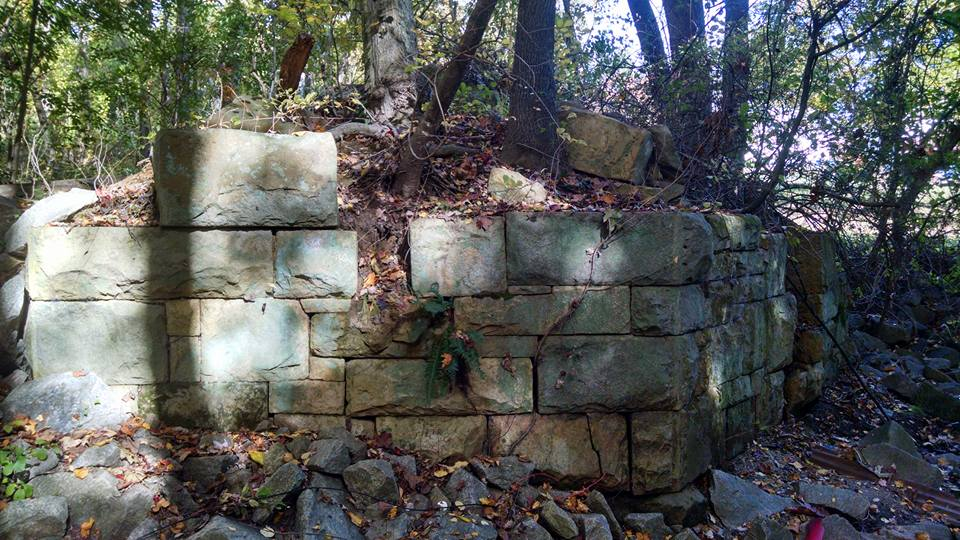
Stone bridge abutment for unfinished Manassas Gap Railroad crossing Indian Run Creek, in Poe Terrace Park

Annandale has parks scattered across its geographical region and a number of them are maintained by the Fairfax County Park Authority. The following parks are located in Annandale: Mason District Park, The Wakefield Chapel Park, Turkeycock Run Stream Valley Park, Annandale Community Park, Ossian Hall Park, Kendale Woods Park, Mill Creek Park, Wilburdale Park, Broyhill Crest Park, Larchmont Park, Canterbury Woods Park, Hidden Oaks Nature Center (Fairfax County Government Park Authority), Pine Ridge High School Site Park, Camelot School Site Park, Oak Hill Park, Backlick Park, Willow Woods Park, Valley Crest Park, Long Branch Falls Park, Manassas Gap Park, Fairfax Hills Park, Masonville Park, Howery Field Park, Poe Terrace Park, Rose Lane Park, Indian Run Stream Valley Park, and Accotink Stream Valley Park.

The Wakefield Skate Park is also located within Wakefield Park (now in the Wakefield CDP). The skate park also offers skateboarding, BMX classes and camps for children of all ages and skills.

== Notable people ==
Notable individuals who were born in and/or have lived in Annandale include actor Mark Hamill; country music performer Kelly Willis; actor Dylan Walsh; Christopher McCandless, the subject of author Jon Krakauer's 1996 book, Into the Wild; and Fawn Hall, a notable figure in the Iran-Contra affair. Soccer goalkeeper Bill Hamid is from Annandale. CNN anchor Jim Acosta attended Annandale High School.

== In popular culture ==
In the video game Fallout 3, the city is used as a location under the name of Andale. The city is inhabited by a group of inbred cannibals who proudly go by the title of the "Friendliest Town in the USA".

In 2016, a contentious video posted onto YouTube in 2014 about Annandale, Virginia resurfaced and reached over a million views after the creator, named Angelo Mike, posted it onto Reddit himself. In the video, Mike claims that Annandale is a "funnel for the dregs of society" and points out its flaws with "striking images of filth, ruin, and a dead rat". Although his intention was to create a lighthearted video in which Annandale residents could make fun of the city with him, he has received criticism for misrepresenting the Washington, D.C. suburb.

In the CBS television series NCIS, Annandale is mentioned in the Season 14 episode "Keep Going" (2017), in which a character is identified as living and working in Annandale, Virginia.

In 2024, residents staged a sit-in in Kendale Woods Park to stop Fairfax County Park Authority from renovating the courts to no longer have it be suitable for pickleball, after multiple residents complained about noise. Pickleball players have used chalk to draw lines allowing them to play again. Additionally, the Fairfax County Park Authority stated that residents are welcome to use the 16 other courts in the 5 mile radius of Kendale Woods Park, in a statement sent to the Washington Post.
