= Mantua, Virginia =

- Census-designated place
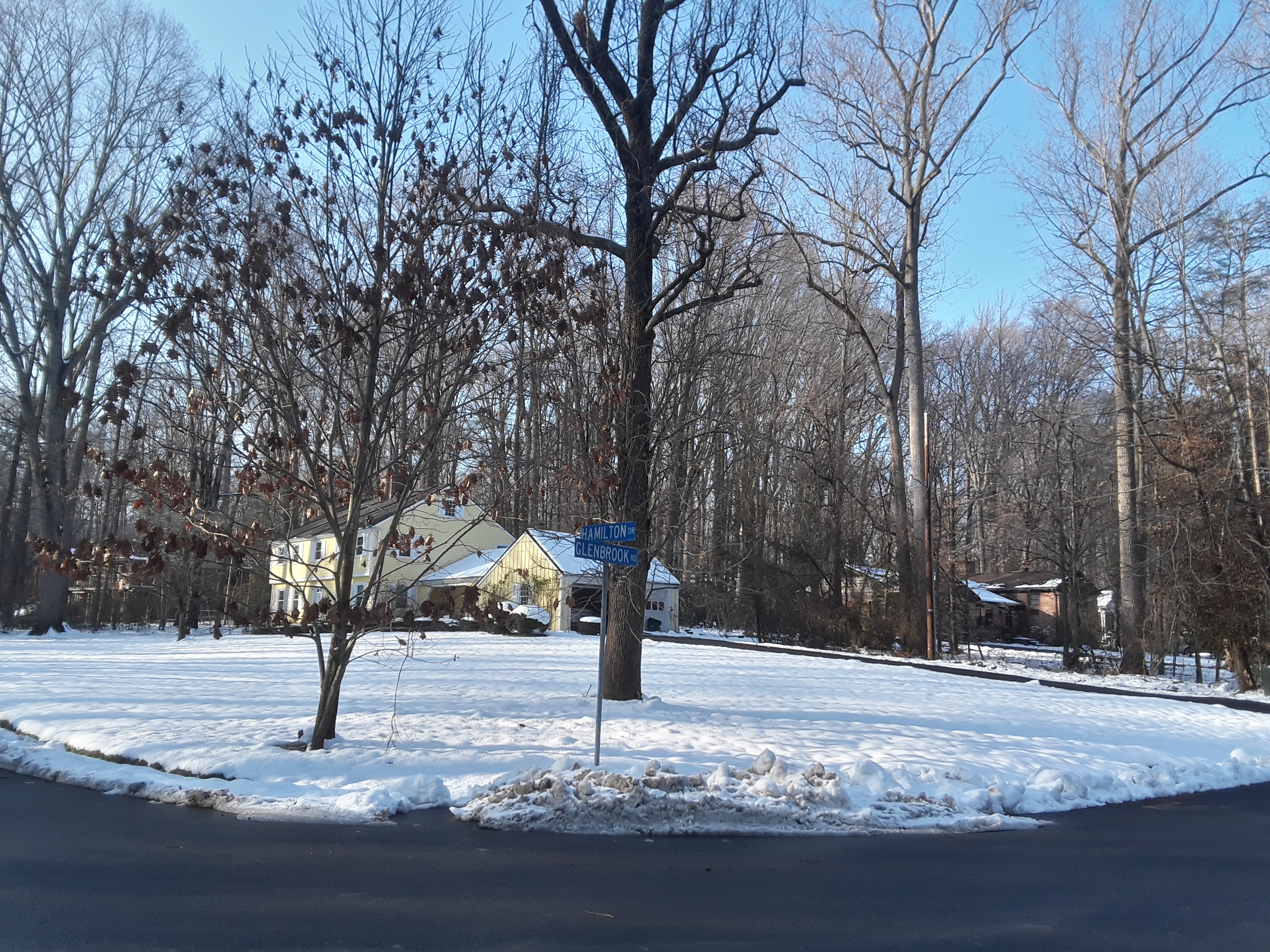
- Street corner in Mantua after snowfall, January 2019

- Location of Mantua in Fairfax County, Virginia

- Location within Northern Virginia Location within Virginia Location within the United States
- Coordinates: 38°51′7″N 77°15′28″W
- Country: United States
- State: Virginia
- County: Fairfax

Area
  - Total: 2.37 sq mi (6.15 km^{2})
  - Land: 2.36 sq mi (6.10 km^{2})
  - Water: 0.023 sq mi (0.06 km^{2})
- Elevation: 371 ft (113 m)

Population (2020)
  - Total: 7,503
  - Density: 3,166/sq mi (1,222.3/km^{2})
- Time zone: UTC−5 (Eastern (EST))
  - Summer (DST): UTC−4 (EDT)
- FIPS code: 51-49144
- GNIS feature ID: 1495049

Mantua is a census-designated place (CDP) in Fairfax County, Virginia, United States. Mantua is a bedroom community serving as a suburb to the Washington, D.C. metropolitan area. Most of the homes in Mantua were built between the 1950s and the 1980s. The population was 7,503 at the 2020 census.

== Geography ==
Mantua is located in central Fairfax County at 38°51′7″N 77°15′28″W (38.852012, −77.257675). It is bordered to the west by the city of Fairfax, to the north by Merrifield, to the east by Woodburn, to the southeast by Wakefield, and to the south by Long Branch. The northern border of the CDP follows U.S. Route 50 (Arlington Boulevard), the southern border follows Virginia State Route 236 (Little River Turnpike), and the eastern border follows Prosperity Avenue. The Capital Beltway (Interstate 495) is 2 miles (3 km) to the east, and downtown Washington is 14 miles (23 km) to the east.

According to the United States Census Bureau, the Mantua CDP has a total area of 2.4 square miles (6.2 km^{2}), of which 0.023 square miles (0.06 km^{2}), or 0.91%, is water. Accotink Creek, a tributary of the Potomac River, flows through the northern part of the CDP, and Crook Branch, a tributary of Accotink Creek, flows through the southern part.

== History ==
=== Texaco oil leak ===
An oil distribution plant, located 2,000 feet (610 m) west of the community along Pickett Road in Fairfax City, was found in 1990 to have leaked approximately 200,000 gallons (approximately 4,700 barrels) of petroleum into 22 acres (0.089 km^{2}) of the soil and groundwater of the Crook Branch watershed. At the time, the distribution plant was owned in part by a subsidiary of Texaco. The oil leakage may have occurred over up to twenty-five years, as the distribution plant had opened in April 1965. Four families were evacuated, and approximately 100 homes were connected to public water and sewer lines. The Environmental Protection Agency (EPA) directed the installation of a "pump-and-treat" groundwater remediation system, which was augmented in 2000 by digging of horizontal infiltration wells, intended to wash contaminated groundwater into the remediation system. Storm sewers in the area were checked for leaks and relining was performed to prevent further contamination of surface water. By 2013, a four-year temporary shutdown test had shown that benzene and methyl tert-butyl ether vapor intrusion in homes directly above the contaminated groundwater plume calculated from sub-slab soil vapor sampling did not exceed the screening limit, and that groundwater contamination east of the distribution plant had fallen to levels controllable by natural degradation. The offsite remediation system was removed by 2016, but cleanup at the distribution plant is ongoing. The oil distribution plant remains in operation as of 2023 using nine reinforced surface tanks, despite objections that community members and a task force appointed by Governor L. Douglas Wilder had raised at the time the leak was being investigated. All underground tanks have since been removed and piping for trucks to discharge oil residual into at the loading rack was installed in 1991: both the underground tanks and the loading rack had been suspected sources of the leak. Groundwater in the Crook Branch watershed continues to be tested annually by the EPA and storm sewers are inspected for cracks.

== Demographics ==
Historical population
Census	Pop.	Note	%±
1990	6,804		—
2000	7,485		10.0%
2010	7,135		−4.7%
2020	7,503		5.2%
U.S. Decennial Census

=== 2020 census ===
Mantua CDP, Virginia – Racial and ethnic composition Note: the US Census treats Hispanic/Latino as an ethnic category. This table excludes Latinos from the racial categories and assigns them to a separate category. Hispanics/Latinos may be of any race.
Race / Ethnicity (NH = Non-Hispanic)	Pop 2000	Pop 2010	Pop 2020	% 2000	% 2010	% 2020
White alone (NH)	5,632	4,920	4,436	75.24%	68.96%	59.12%
Black or African American alone (NH)	144	177	279	1.92%	2.48%	3.72%
Native American or Alaska Native alone (NH)	24	17	14	0.32%	0.24%	0.19%
Asian alone (NH)	1,019	1,407	1,579	13.61%	19.72%	21.04%
Native Hawaiian or Pacific Islander alone (NH)	3	0	1	0.04%	0.00%	0.01%
Other race alone (NH)	13	7	39	0.17%	0.10%	0.52%
Mixed race or Multiracial (NH)	139	166	447	1.86%	2.33%	5.96%
Hispanic or Latino (any race)	511	441	708	6.83%	6.18%	9.44%
Total	7,485	7,135	7,503	100.00%	100.00%	100.00%

=== 2010 census ===
As of the 2010 census, there were 7,135 people, 2,628 households, and 1,936 families residing in the CDP. The population density was 3,031.0 people per square mile. There were 2,766 housing units at an average density of 716.3 per square mile (276.6/km^{2}). The racial makeup of the CDP was 73.5% White, 19.7% Asian, 2.6% African American, 0.3% Native American, 1.2% from other races, and 2.7% from two or more races. Hispanics and Latinos of any race were 6.2% of the population.

The median age was 46.1 years. 25.6% of the population was under the age of 18, 6.3% was 18 to 24, 18.6% was 25 to 44, 31.7% was 45 to 64, and 17.8% were 65 years of age or older. The gender makeup of the community was 48.2% male and 51.8% female.

The median income for a household in the CDP was $112,008. About 3.8% of families and 5.2% of the population were below the poverty line, including 6.6% of those under the age of 18 and 7.2% of those 65 and older.

== Public schools ==
Mantua's former principal, Jan-Marie Fernandez, was awarded the "2010 National Distinguished Principal for Virginia" and Woodson HS is ranked #280 in U.S. News & World Report's National Rankings.

The community is served by the Fairfax County Public Schools.

Secondary schools serving Mantua include:

- Frost Middle School
- Woodson High School

== Notable people ==
- Gerry Connolly, former member of the United States House of Representatives
- Stephen E. Gordy, member of the Virginia House of Delegates
- Augusto and Michaela Odone, subjects of the 1992 film Lorenzo's Oil starring Nick Nolte and Susan Sarandon
- Lorenzo Odone, notable ALD patient
