= Accotink =

Accotink refers to multiple placenames and geological features within the U.S. state of Virginia.

- Accotink, Virginia
- Accotink Bay
- Accotink Bay Wildlife Refuge
- Accotink Creek
- Lake Accotink
