= Ravensworth, Virginia =

- Census-designated place
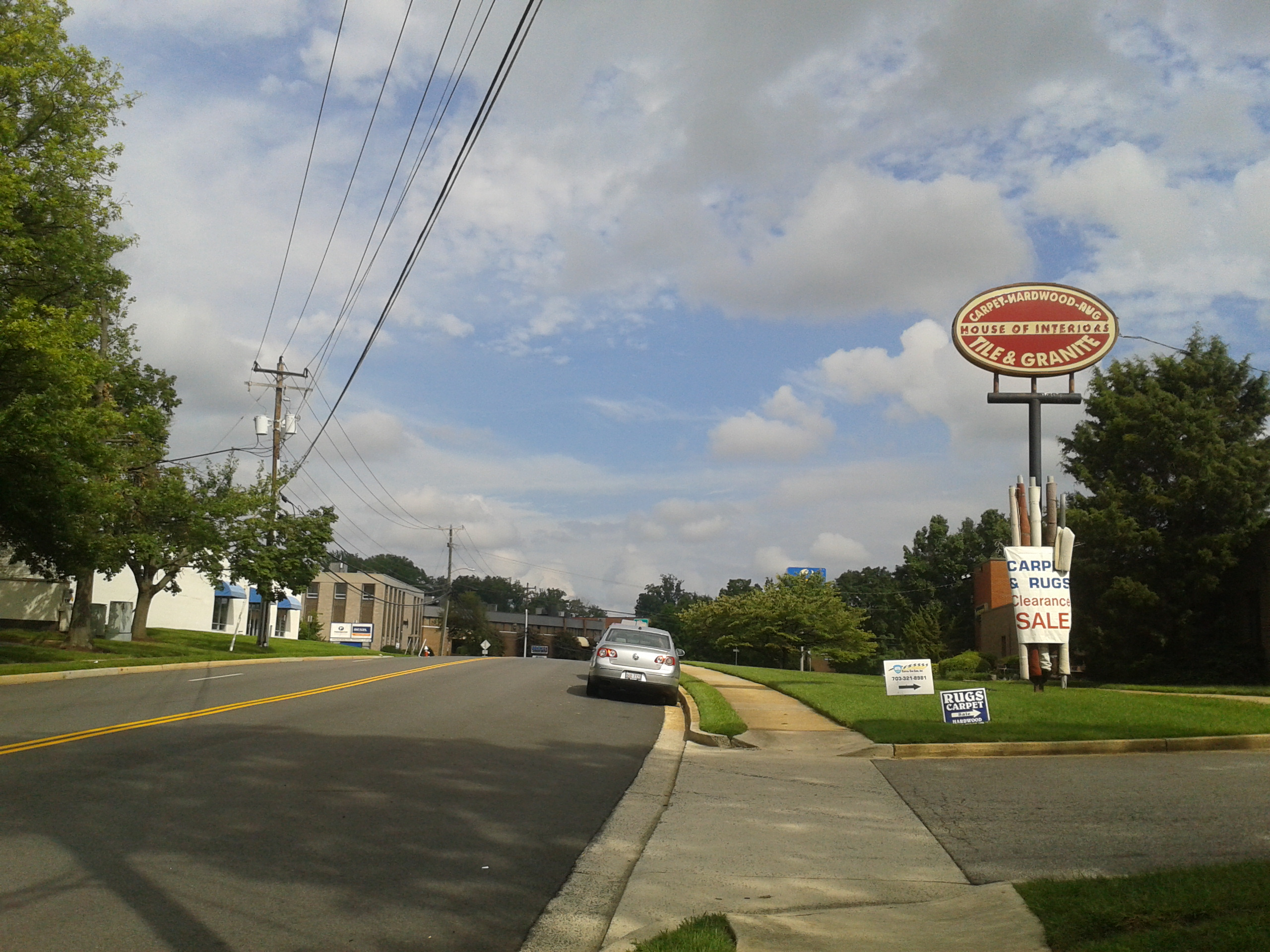
- Light industrial street scene in Ravensworth, August, 2017

- Location within Northern Virginia Location within Virginia Location within the United States
- Coordinates: 38°48′11″N 77°13′21″W
- Country: United States
- State: Virginia
- County: Fairfax

Area
  - Total: 0.98 sq mi (2.54 km^{2})
  - Land: 0.88 sq mi (2.29 km^{2})
  - Water: 0.10 sq mi (0.26 km^{2})
- Elevation: 265 ft (81 m)

Population (2020)
  - Total: 2,680
  - Density: 2,790/sq mi (1,077.1/km^{2})
- Time zone: UTC−5 (Eastern (EST))
  - Summer (DST): UTC−4 (EDT)
- ZIP code: 22151
- FIPS code: 51-65776
- GNIS feature ID: 2584907

Ravensworth is a census-designated place in Fairfax County, Virginia, United States. Its name reflects Ravensworth plantation, farmed since the 18th century and manor house which burned under mysterious circumstances on August 1, 1926. The Ravensworth Farm subdivision was developed in the early 1960s. As of the 2020 census, Ravensworth had a population of 2,680. It is part of the Washington metropolitan area.

== Geography ==
Ravensworth is in eastern Fairfax County, bordered by the Capital Beltway to the northeast, Braddock Road to the north, Accotink Creek to the west, Lake Accotink to the south, and Flag Run to the southeast. Neighboring communities are Wakefield to the north, North Springfield to the east, and Kings Park to the south and west. Downtown Washington, D.C., is 14 miles (23 km) to the northeast. The CDP border follows Accotink Creek to the west, Braddock Road to the north, Interstate 495 to the east, and Flag Run to the southeast.

According to the U.S. Census Bureau, the Ravensworth CDP has a total area of 0.98 square miles (2.54 km^{2}), of which 0.88 square miles (2.29 km^{2}) is land and 0.10 square miles (0.26 km^{2}), or 10.02%, is water.

== Demographics ==
Historical population
Census	Pop.	Note	%±
2010	2,466		—
2020	2,680		8.7%
U.S. Decennial Census; 2010 2020

Ravensworth was first listed as a census designated place in the 2010 U.S. census formed from part of North Springfield CDP.

=== 2020 census ===
Ravensworth CDP, Virginia – Racial and ethnic composition Note: the US Census treats Hispanic/Latino as an ethnic category. This table excludes Latinos from the racial categories and assigns them to a separate category. Hispanics/Latinos may be of any race.
Race / Ethnicity (NH = Non-Hispanic)	Pop 2010	Pop 2020	% 2010	% 2020
White alone (NH)	1,452	1,263	58.88%	47.13%
Black or African American alone (NH)	59	67	2.39%	2.50%
Native American or Alaska Native alone (NH)	5	5	0.20%	0.19%
Asian alone (NH)	531	698	21.53%	26.04%
Native Hawaiian or Pacific Islander alone (NH)	4	1	0.16%	0.04%
Other race alone (NH)	10	22	0.41%	0.82%
Mixed race or Multiracial (NH)	50	134	2.03%	5.00%
Hispanic or Latino (any race)	355	490	14.40%	18.28%
Total	2,466	2,680	100.00%	100.00%

== Economy ==
The corporate headquarters of Ensco is physically located in Ravensworth CDP, with a Springfield postal address.

== Education ==
Fairfax County Public Schools operates Ravensworth Elementary School in the CDP. It has a 7/10 rating on Great Schools.
