= Eakin Community Park =

Park in Fairfax County, Virginia, US

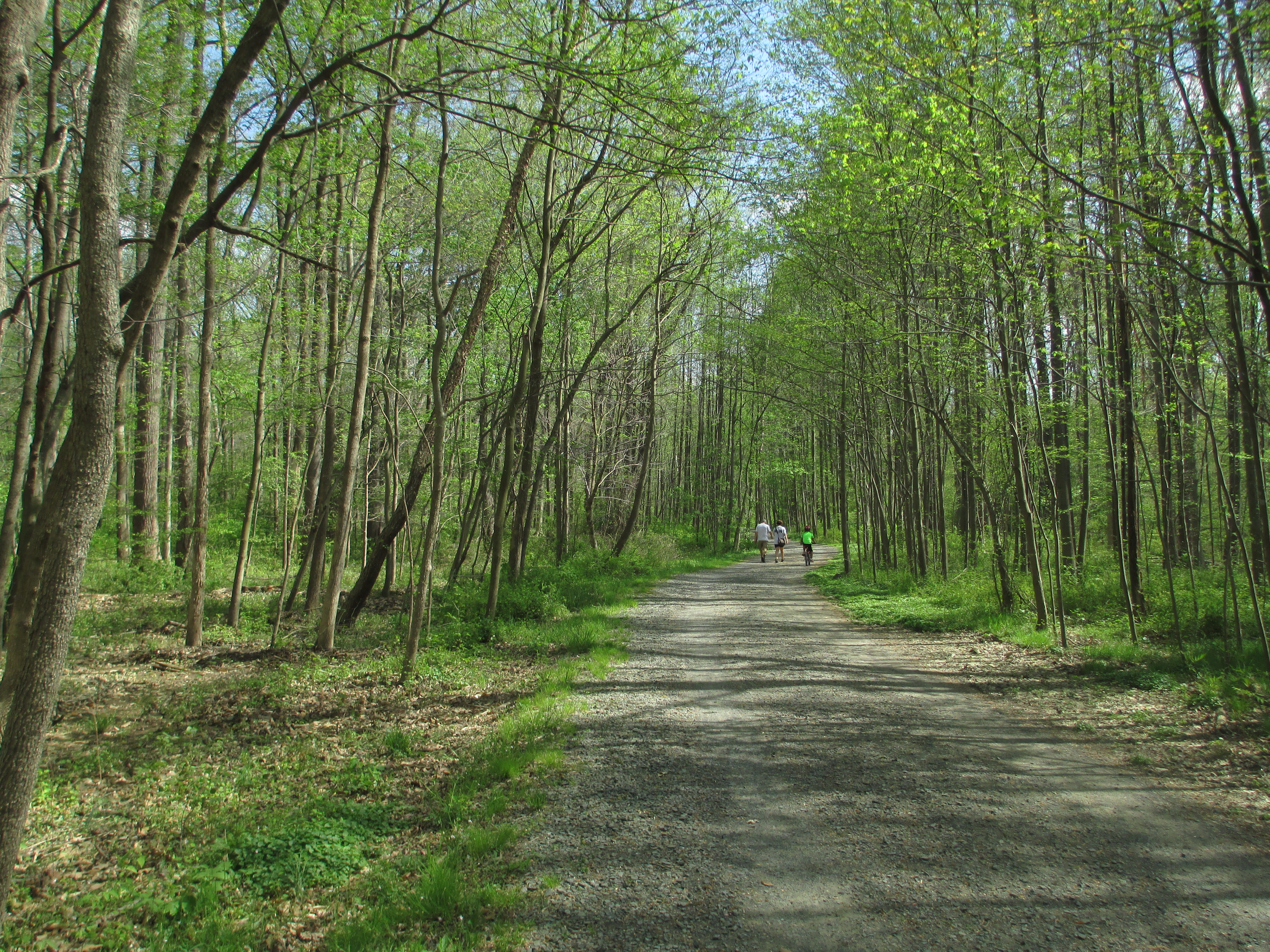
- The Accotink Trail in Eakin Community Park
- Interactive map of Eakin Community Park
- Type: Public park
- Location: Fairfax County, Virginia
- Coordinates: 38°51′18″N 77°15′02″W
- Area: 57 acres (23 ha)
- Operator: Fairfax County Park Authority
- Open: All year
- Parking: 45 spaces

Eakin Community Park is a 57-acre (23 ha) county park in Fairfax County, Virginia. It is managed by the Fairfax County Park Authority. The park runs roughly northwest to southeast along Accotink Creek. The northwest corner is bordered by Pickett Road and Arlington Boulevard, and the southeast corner is bordered by Woodburn Road. Barkley Road and Prosperity Avenue cut across the park and over Accotink Creek.

== History ==
The park is named after LeRoy Eakin, Sr. who in 1951 donated 14 acres (5.7 ha) of land that became Fairfax County's very first park. Remnants of mill races from the 19th century can be found in the park; signage is posted along the Accotink Trail.

== Facilities and access ==
There are portable restrooms available seasonally from late March to late November, but no potable water sources.

=== Accotink Trail ===
The Accotink Trail runs through Eakin Community Park and traces the path of Accotink Creek. This mixed-use trail is used by hikers and bicyclists. It is paved in some parts and the rest is a gravel or stone dust surface. The trail is part of the larger Cross County Trail, which runs north-south across Fairfax County from Great Falls, Virginia to the town of Occoquan, Virginia.

=== Tobin Road entrance ===
At the Tobin Road entrance, there are two baseball/softball fields, two tennis courts, and three beach sand volleyball courts. There is a paved parking lot with 43 parking spaces. A community garden that is managed by Green Spring Gardens Park may be reached by taking the small paved road to the right of the main parking lot up the hill. A gravel parking lot is situated next to the community garden.

=== Prosperity Avenue entrance ===
At the Prosperity Avenue entrance, there is a parking lot and a large shady playground area for children.

== Wildlife ==
Wildlife found in the park is typical for the region. White-tailed deer are quite common and beavers and foxes can be seen occasionally. The park is a popular bird watching area.
