= Accotink, Virginia =

Unincorporated community in Virginia, United States

- Unincorporated community
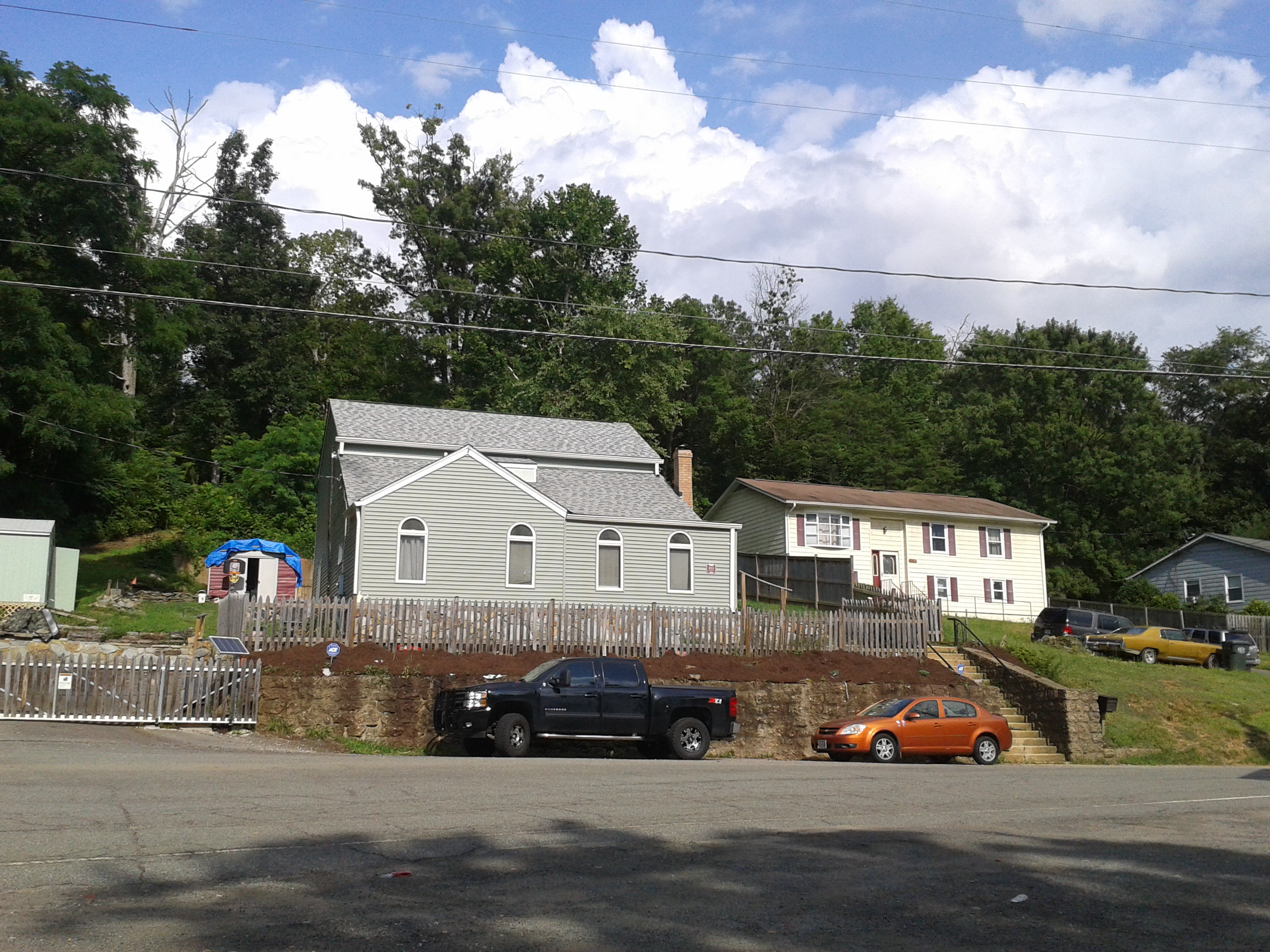
- Houses along Backlick Road in Accotink

- Location within Northern Virginia Location within Virginia Location within the United States
- Coordinates: 38°42′30″N 77°9′34″W
- Country: United States
- State: Virginia
- County: Fairfax
- Time zone: UTC−5 (Eastern (EST))
  - Summer (DST): UTC−4 (EDT)
- GNIS feature ID: 1494807

Accotink is an unincorporated community in Fairfax County, Virginia, United States. Accotink is located along Accotink Creek within Fort Belvoir.

Accotink Bay, Accotink Bay Wildlife Refuge, and Lake Accotink are also in the area.

The Magnus Temple of the Ancient Egyptian Arabic Order of the Nobles of the Mystic Shrine is in Accotink.

== See also ==
- Fort Belvoir
- Gunston Cove
