= List of crossings of Accotink Creek =

This is a complete list of current bridges and other crossings of Accotink Creek from its mouth at the Potomac River to its source.

== Crossings ==
All locations are in Virginia. Pedestrian-only bridges are marked in italics.

Image	Crossing	Opened	Coordinates	Notes
Fort Belvoir
	Beaver Pond Trail	ca. 2015		Replaced older footbridge
	Poe Road	1981		
	US 1 (Richmond Highway)	2015, 2016	38.7079°N 77.1688°W	
	Farrar Drive	2011		
	Ehlers Road	1975		
Newington
	SR 611 (Telegraph Road)	2001		
	CSX Transportation RF&P Subdivision		38.7228°N 77.2041°W	
	I-95 (Henry G. Shirley Memorial Highway)	1993	38.7249°N 77.2039°W	
	SR 790 (Alban Road)	1950		
	Fullerton Road	1976, 1992		
Fort Belvoir North
	SR 286 (Fairfax County Parkway)	2010, 2011	38.7456°N 77.1973°W	
	Barta Road	2010		
Springfield–West Springfield
	SR 636 (Hooes Road)	1976		
	SR 289 (Franconia–Springfield Parkway)	1989	38.7619°N 77.2082°W	
	Cross County Trail			
	SR 644 (Old Keene Mill Road)	1964		
	Cross County Trail			
	Cross County Trail			
	Norfolk Southern Railway Washington District		38.7927°N 77.2188°W	
North Springfield–West Springfield
	Accotink Loop Trail			
	Lake Accotink dam		38.7933°N 77.2187°W	
	Accotink Loop Trail			
	SR 620 (Braddock Road)	1972		
Annandale
	Cross County Trail		38.8267°N 77.2239°W	
	SR 236 (Little River Turnpike)	1961, 2011, 2012	38.8344°N 77.2186°W	
	Cross County Trail	after 1995		
	Cross County Trail	after 1995		
	Cross County Trail	after 1995		
	King Arthur Road	1964		
	Woodburn Road	1990		
Mantua
	SR 699 (Prosperity Avenue)	1988		
	SR 979 (Barkley Drive)	1968		
	Cross County Trail	after 1995		
Fairfax
	SR 237 (Pickett Road)	1983	38.8615°N 77.2701°W	
	Wilcoxon Park footbridge			
	Wilcoxon Park footbridge			
	Old Lee Highway	1976		
	Wilcoxon Park footbridge			
	US 29 / US 50 (Fairfax Boulevard)	1978	38.8637°N 77.2831°W	
	Ranger Road Park footbridge			
	US 29 / US 50 (Fairfax Boulevard)	1978	38.8628°N 77.2897°W	
	Footbridge to Dale Drive			
	Van Dyck Park footbridge			
	University Drive			
	Belle's Bird Sanctuary footbridge	2014		
	SR 123 (Chain Bridge Road)	2014	38.8508°N 77.3078°W	Replaced earlier bridge
	Meadow Bridge Lane			
	SR 236 (Main Street)	1971	38.8481°N 77.3123°W	
	Judicial Drive			
	Fairfax Nursing Center footbridge			
	Presbyterian Way			
	Woodland Drive			
	Poplar Street			
	Hallman Street			
