= List of lakes of the Washington, D.C., area =

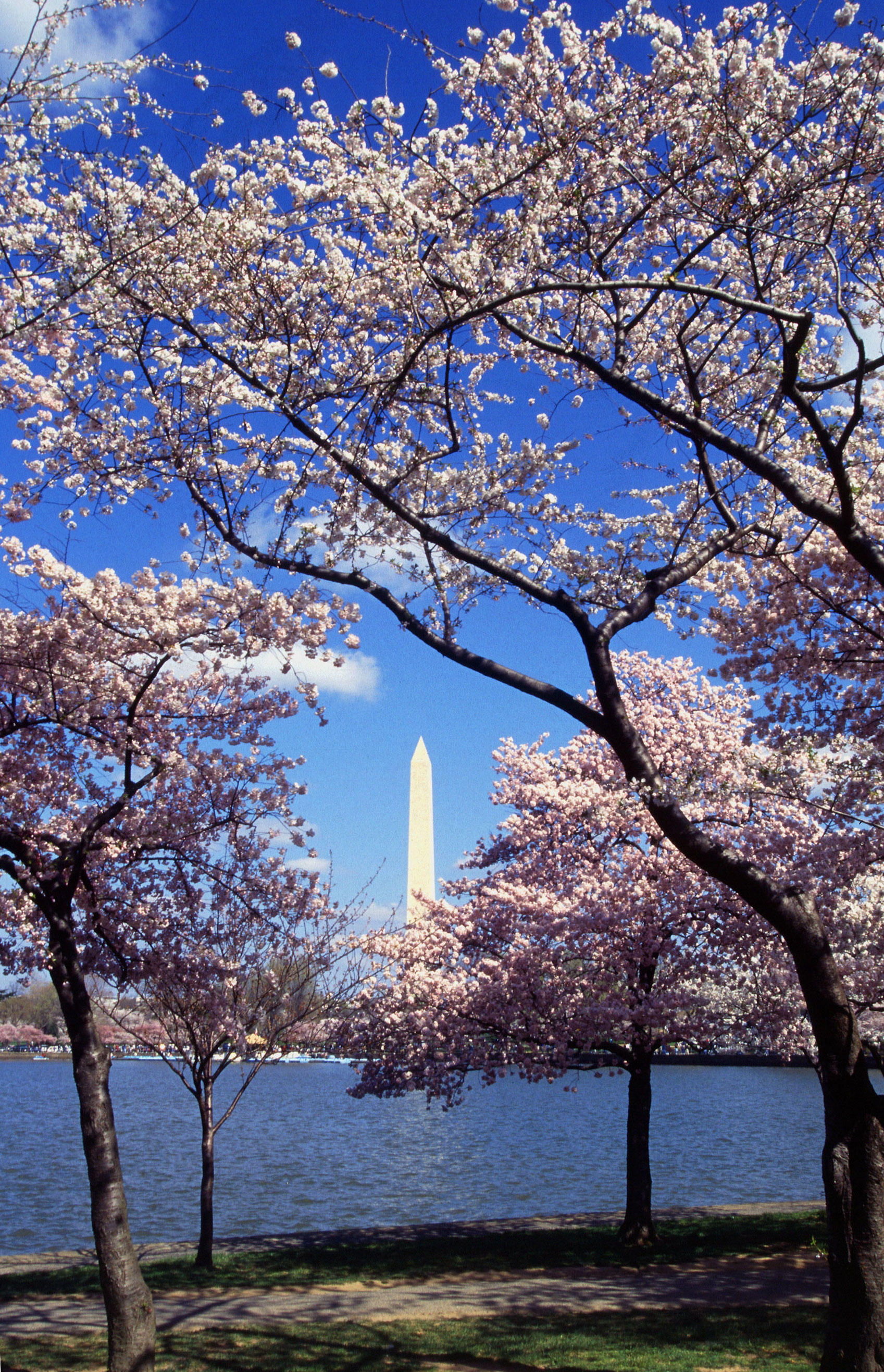
The Tidal Basin with cherry blossoms

The Washington metropolitan area has several important lakes and reservoirs. The U.S. Army Corps of Engineers created several of the reservoirs in the Washington D.C. area.

== Lakes ==
- Lake Accotink
- Lake Anne
- Lake Artemesia
- Babcock Lakes (no longer exist)
- Lake Barcroft, Virginia
- Lake Bernard Frank
- Lake Braddock
- Burke Lake
- Culler Lake
- Lake Fairfax Park
- Kingman Lake
- Little Seneca Lake
- Lake Manassas
- Lake Mooney
- Lake Needwood
- Tidal Basin

== Reservoirs ==
- Breckenridge Reservoir
- Dalecarlia Reservoir
- Georgetown Reservoir
- McMillan Reservoir
- Occoquan Reservoir
- Rocky Gorge Reservoir
