= Difficult Run =

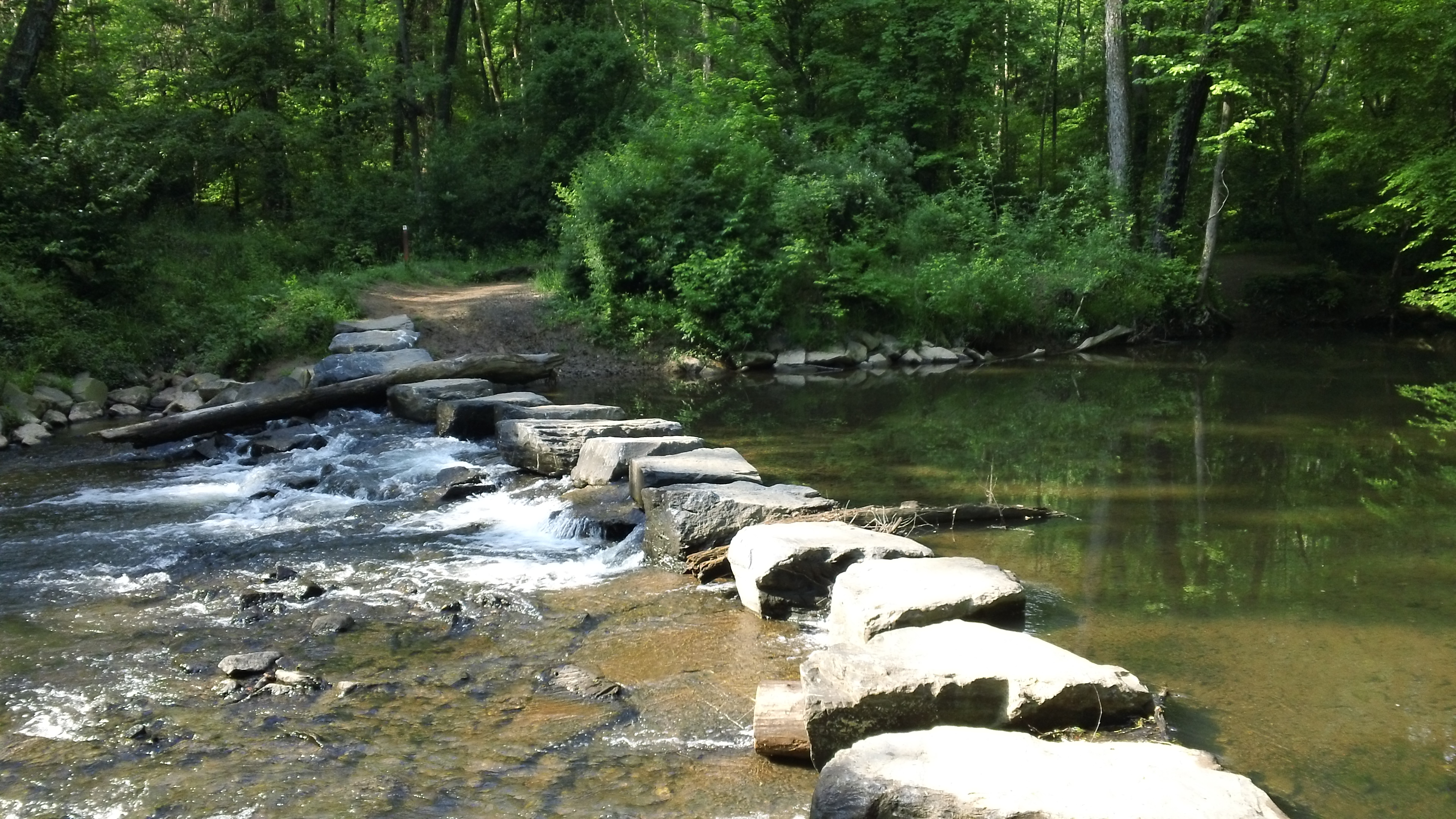
- The Cross County Trail crossing the stream at Difficult Run

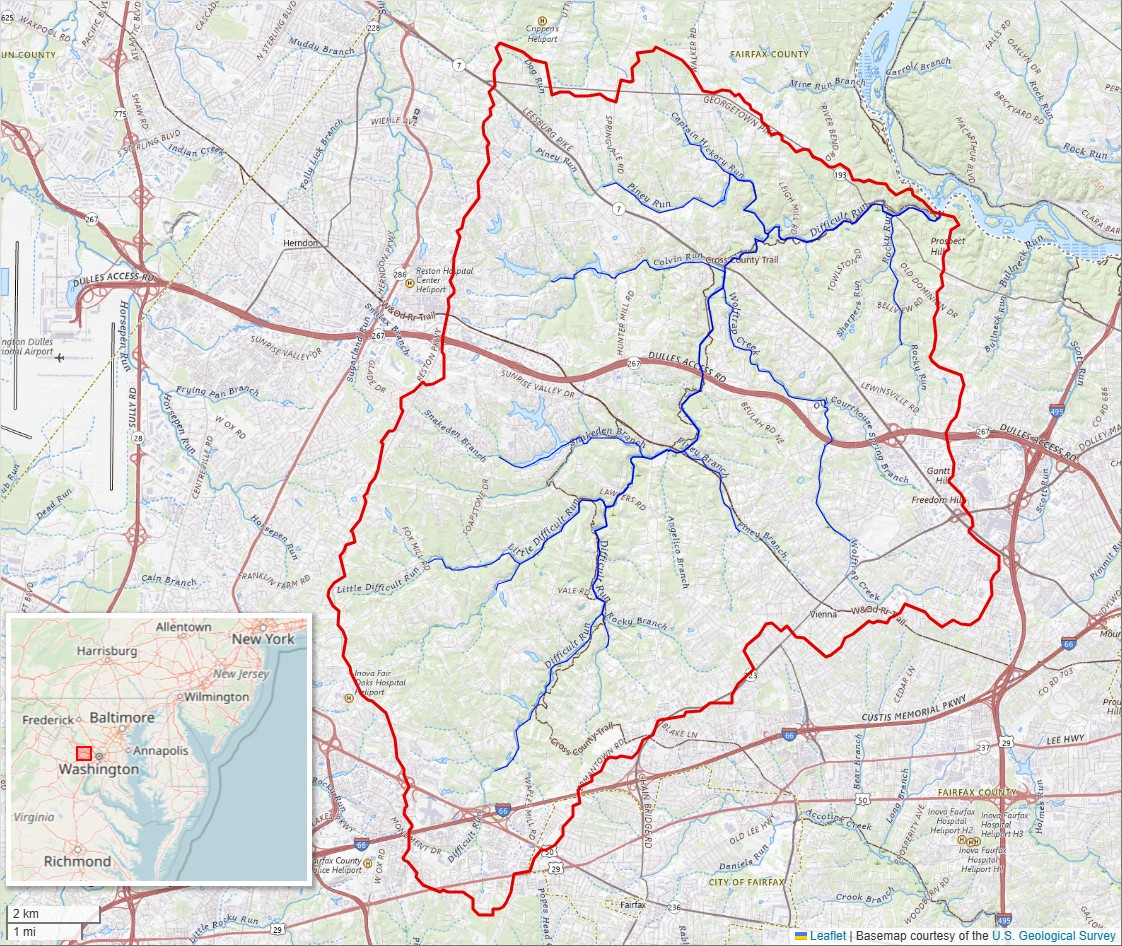
- Difficult Run watershed (Interactive map)

Location
- Country: United States
- Location: Northern Virginia

Physical characteristics
- Mouth
  - location: Potomac River
- Basin size: 57.7 mi^{2} (149 km^{2})

Difficult Run is a 15.9-mile-long (25.6 km) tributary stream of the Potomac River in Northern Virginia in the United States.

The stream is part of a 57.7-square-mile drainage basin, or watershed, in the north-central portion of Fairfax County, Virginia. Difficult Run flows through Great Falls Park, where it has been characterized as "a miniature Mather Gorge and Great Falls." The stream picks up speed as it runs through a steep gorge with waterfalls, and drains into the Potomac.

The wildlife includes 163 species, depending on the season, and 41 soil types are found on the trail and alongside the stream.

Used for many purposes since the early 1800s, the area is today used for hiking, biking, fishing, boating, climbing, and bird watching.

== Historical and cultural usage ==
It was named by long-boatmen in the time of the Patowmack Company, who found the two sharp bends of the Potomac near Difficult Run's mouth treacherous.

=== Mills ===
Tolston's Mill on the east side of the trail is today owned by the Madeira School. Leigh Mill, once on the west side of the trail, ground flour during the late 1800s. Colvin's Mill, today part of Colvin Run Mill Park, used to be managed by Fairfax County Park Authority. Brown's Mill was on a tributary of the trail across from Beulah Road.

==== Pikes and roads ====
Old Georgetown Pike developed into a state highway in June 1974. The pike was a route followed by colonists and Indians where commerce was brought from Loudoun County and the Shenandoah Valley to Georgetown. Another road that went along the trail is the Old Leesburg Pike. This pike initially went through the Difficult Run on the northern side of the current bridge. General Braddock utilized the old highway during the French and Indian Wars where he marched his troops throughout the road on their way to Fort Duquesne. The old access to the bridge is still visible, but not currently in use.

==== Houses and taverns ====
The Thomas Peacock house is still currently located on the eastern part of the Difficult Run. This land was once owned by George Washington. After Washington owned it the Sheppards bought it from him and built the house on this land in the early 19th century. The 18th century miller's house stands on the Difficult Run and was built by the miller of the mill on Hunter Mill Road. Wiley's Tavern is located on the south side of current Leesburg Pike.

==== Other sites ====
There are various other sites along the trail, which include Drover's Rest, Old Quarry, Old Dominion Drive Bridge, Colvin Run Village, and Day Family Cemetery.

=== Modern usage ===
Today the trail is used for hiking, biking, sightseeing, etc. The stream also is known for its various rapids that flow down it. The different rapids are all classified differently as one goes farther down the stream. The seven rapids that occur in the stream all have classifications that range from Class III to V. The Difficult Run is also famously known for its views of the Potomac and Mather Gorge cliffs.

== Recreation ==
Recreational activities at Difficult Run include hiking, biking, climbing, boating, fishing, and sightseeing. The watershed itself encompasses a few parks and trails originating in Reston and reaching all the way to the Potomac River, at the end of the Difficult Run trail in Great Falls. Additionally, Difficult Run offers access to Great Falls National Park from certain areas of the trail, adding to the options for recreational activity.

=== Mountain biking ===
Using community planning, a secluded 12-mile (19 km) hiking and biking trail was built along Difficult Run from Reston to Great Falls Park. The trail is well known among area mountain biking enthusiasts for its rolling terrain which makes for fast, smooth rides although there are portions requiring technical skills. The portion of the trail that sees the most mountain biking activity starts near the end of Michael Faraday Court, behind SkateQuest-Reston ice skating rink and follows the tributary stream valley to Lake Fairfax. From Lake Fairfax the trail crosses over Hunter Mill Road and follows Difficult Run itself all the way to Great Falls Park. Great Falls Park is a unit of the George Washington Memorial Parkway, and is administered by the National Park Service. In addition, almost the entire length of Difficult Run is paralleled by the Cross County Trail, which is maintained by the Fairfax County Park Authority for continuous coverage along the run.

=== Hiking ===
The Difficult Run trail enters Great Falls Park and offers views of the Potomac River and Great Falls. The trail is 4.9 miles roundtrip and is estimated to take 2.5 hours. The various trails of Great Falls National Park (Ridge trail, Matildaville trail, Swamp trail, and Old Carriage Road) are also accessible from this hike. Trail markers and other indicators for key locations are present. Along the trail is the Cow Hoof Rock, which is a popular spot for many of the parks rock climbers.

=== Fishing ===
While fishing is allowed at Great Falls National Park and Difficult Run, a license is required for fishermen 16 years or older. This section of the Potomac River is known mainly for hosting Smallmouth Bass, Sunfish, and Catfish. It is encouraged that all mess is cleaned, as the park has a no trash policy and has no trash cans available on-site.

=== Boating ===
This is the most popular of recreational activities at the Potomac River adjacent to Difficult Run. Whitewater boating (kayak/canoe) is commonly exercised as the rapids found in Great Falls Park are rated from class II (moderately easy) to class VI. Class VI rapids are considered extremely dangerous, as they are highest category of all rapid classes. A series of rapids starting at the Difficult Run Georgetown Pike entrance will lead to directly into the Potomac River. These rapids along the Difficult Run stream range from class III to class V. The Potomac River has many challenging currents, standing waves, and hydraulics. Swimming, wading, and tubing are not allowed in the river.

=== Climbing ===
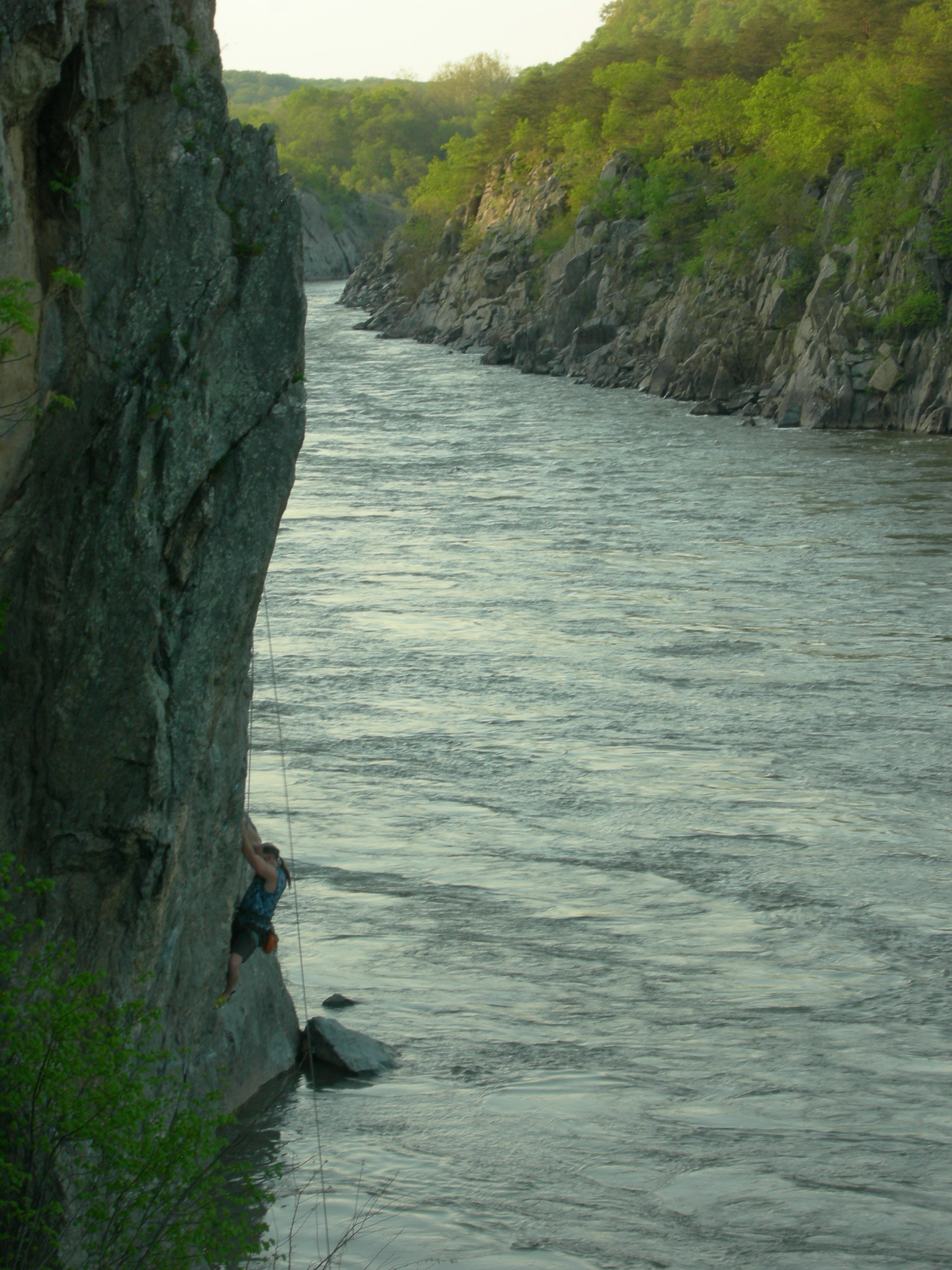
View of the Mather Gorge that is visible from the end of the Difficult Run Trail.

Climbing at Difficult Run can be done both with or without direction. The large number of rocks offer creative options for some park visitors. Others find direction by climbing routes set near the Potomac River. Routes vary from 25 to 75 feet in length. All climbing is top rope and no screws may be drilled into the rock. All climbing materials must be supplied by the park goer. Climbing routes are not available when the water level is high, specifically above a 4.5 on the Little Falls gauge. This reading can be found daily in the Washington Post's “River Stages” section.

The Cow Hoof Rock features 9 different climbing routes ranging from 5.8 to 5.12 in difficulty. The climbs include:

•F.I.S.T. (5.9-)

•Hemlock (5.10+)

•Hard Nut (A3)

•Socrates’ Downfall (5.8)

•Claws (5.12)

•Titania (5.10-)

•Ariel (5.9)

•Caliban (5.8)

•It's the Feet (5.10-)

== Flora and fauna ==
American-Copperhead snake: The only venomous snake which inhabits Difficult Run Trail

Various species of birds, fish, and other animals live along the trail. Muskrat and beaver can be found in the stream which runs adjoined to the trail which empties into the river known to provide habitation for various fish. 163 different species of birds are found here, these birds would include ducks, geese, and herons. Others would include songbirds, woodpeckers, vultures, and kingfishers. As for snakes, copperheads are the only type of venomous snake found in the trail.

In the region where Difficult Run trail is found, birds such as the Scarlet Tanager and Kentucky Warbler inhabit the environment during the Spring months. These birds migrate North to live for the Summer, which includes Fairfax County. These are song birds brightly colored with plumage of gold, red, and blue. The ground nesting birds appear in the Spring first, which would consist of the Kentucky warbler. Nested in the trees are the Scarlet Tanager. Other birds native to the trail during the Spring are the Prothonotary warbler and Swallows.

During the Spring, Skunk cabbage is the first to bloom in January. Seasonal varieties also include Pink lady slippers, Fairy spuds, and Trout lilies.

== Geography ==
=== Trail ===
Located at 38.98 latitude and 77.25 longitude, the Difficult Run trail is located inside of Great Falls Park. Difficult Run lands in the Virginia side of the park. The trail is 0.7 miles one way making it a 1.4 mile round trip. The scenic trail starts near Georgetown Pike and ends where the difficult run stream meets the Potomac River. The trail is narrow and rocky in some sections and could cause problems to those with handicaps. The route consists of mostly non-paved trail systems with a few paved areas. Hikers, cyclists and horseback riders can make connections using Difficult Run to get to the Fairfax Cross Country Trail. This can be done on the Georgetown Pike end of the Difficult Run trail. Pets are allowed on the trail but must be on a leash at all times.

=== Drainage basin ===
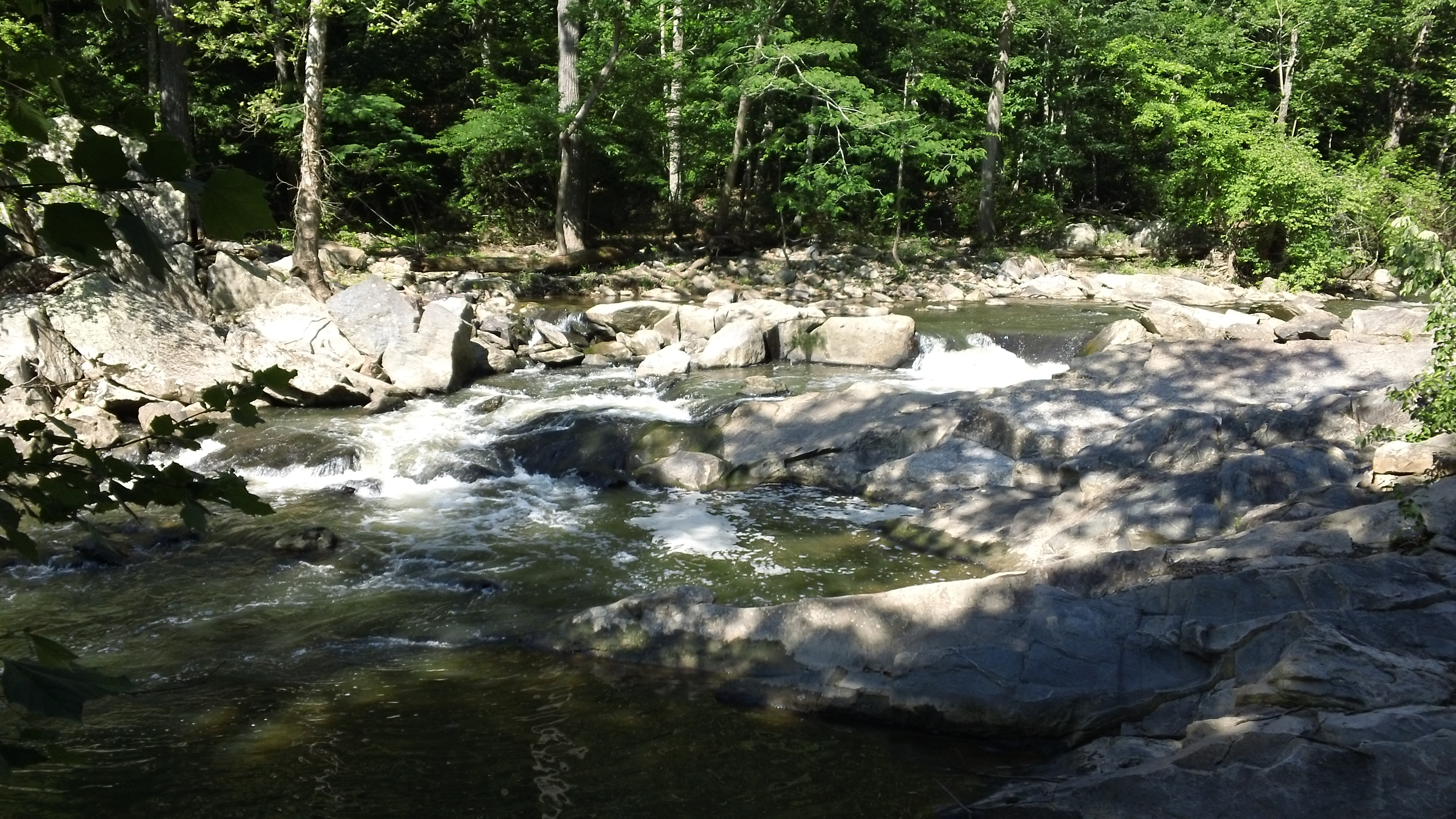
The Difficult run tributary as seen from the Georgetown Pike entrance, before it flows into the Potomac River

The stream is member to a 57.7- square-mile watershed located in the north-central portion of Fairfax County and drains directly to the Potomac River. Along its journey the stream travels over a series of rapids and through numerous rocky beds. There are 9 different streams and tributaries that work into or out of the Potomac river. They are Captain Hickory Run, Piney Run, Colvin Run, Snakeden Branch, Little Difficult Run, Rocky Run, Angelico Branch, Piney Branch, and Wolftrap Creek. The water is crossed by several major highways, including Leesburg Pike, I-66, Route 50, the Dulles Access Road, and by the W&OD Trail. The water runs off and forms four man made lakes. Lake Anne, Lake Fairfax, Lake Thoreau and Lake Audubon. Difficult Run flows through a wide variety of watershed conditions, from forest to urban areas. Just before it empties into the Potomac River, it flows through a narrow, cliff-lined valley. Difficult Run is the largest watershed in Fairfax County, Virginia.

=== Soil ===
There are 41 different soil types found on the trail and alongside the stream. Two major soil groups make up the contents: The Glenelg-Elioak-Manor association and the Manor-Glenelg-Elioak association. The Glenelg soil type makes up 40.5 percent of the watershed area and is found throughout the watershed, primarily on hilltops and side slopes. Manor soils make up almost 11 percent of the watershed. Suspended sediment is a major problem in the Difficult Run area and water entering Chesapeake Bay. In 1993 Fairfax Relief and the Virginia Soil and water conservation district planted 1,109 native hardwoods as a part of a restoration project on a large flood plain for the main stem of the Difficult run stream. A lot of the soil found in this area is marine clay. This type of soil is found all around Fairfax County and is very problematic. This particular soil contains clays that swell up when wet and then shrink down when they dry. This can cause land slippage, slope instability, poor foundation support and poor drainage. Another soil problem found in this area is naturally occurring asbestos fibers that have weathered off of greenstone bedrock. It is a very rare problem but asbestos can be potentially very hazardous if not detected. Soil conservation has rapidly been accelerating in the Difficult Run area for a very long time. This conservation can help stop landslides, corrosion, and contamination by metals

== Crossings ==
All locations are in Fairfax County, Virginia. Pedestrian-only bridges are marked in italics.

Image	Crossing	Location	Opened	Coordinates	Notes
	SR 193 (Georgetown Pike)	Great Falls–McLean	1978	38.7899°N 77.0514°W	
	SR 738 (Old Dominion Drive)	Great Falls–McLean	1979		
	Cross County Trail	Great Falls–McLean			
	SR 683 (Leigh Mill Road)	Great Falls–McLean	2011 (reopened)		
	Cross County Trail	Great Falls–McLean			
	SR 7 (Leesburg Pike)	Great Falls–McLean / Wolf Trap	1969		
	SR 675 (Browns Mill Road)	Wolf Trap	1969		
	Cross County Trail	Wolf Trap			
	SR 267 Toll (Dulles Toll Road / Dulles Access Road); Washington Metro Silver Line	Wolf Trap	1963, 1984		
	Cross County Trail	Wolf Trap			
	Washington & Old Dominion Trail	Wolf Trap			
	SR 674 (Hunter Mill Road)	Wolf Trap–Oakton	2011		
	SR 673 (Lawyers Road)	Reston–Oakton	1985		
	Gabrielson Bridge	Difficult Run–Oakton			Old bridge constructed late 1940s and removed in 2018; replacement bridge in planning
	SR 672 (Vale Road)	Difficult Run–Oakton	1986		
	Cross County Trail (Old Vale Road Bridge)	Difficult Run–Oakton			
	SR 665 (Waples Mill Road)	Difficult Run—Oakton / Fair Oaks	1970		
	Valley Road	Fair Oaks			
	US 50 (Lee Jackson Memorial Highway); I-66	Fair Oaks	1964		culvert beneath interchange
	Random Hills Road	Fair Oaks			
	Monument Drive	Fair Oaks	2004		
	Fairfax Government Center footbridge	Fair Oaks			
	Fairfax Government Center footbridge	Fair Oaks			
	Fairfax Government Center footbridge	Fair Oaks			
	Fairfax Government Center footbridge	Fair Oaks			
	Government Center Parkway	Fair Oaks			

== See also ==
- List of Virginia rivers

== Bibliography ==
- Corbett, Roger. "Difficult Run - Old Georgetown Pike (Route 193) to Potomac R." American Whitewater. American Whitewater, n.d. Web. 08 Apr. 2016.
- "Difficult Run Hike." Hiking Upward. Virginia Parks and Forests, n.d. Web. 08 Apr. 2016.
- Sihler, Bob. "Cow Hoof Rock." : Climbing, Hiking & Mountaineering : SummitPost. Summitpost, 11 Nov. 2013. Web. 08 Apr. 2016.
- Sihler, Bob. "Difficult Run Trail." : Mountain Biking : MBPost. MBpost, 12 Nov. 2011. Web. 08 Apr. 2016.
- United States. National Park Service. "Hiking." National Park Service. U.S. Department of the Interior, n.d. Web. 08 Apr. 2016.
- United States. National Park Service. "Outdoor Activities." National Park Service. U.S. Department of the Interior, n.d. Web. 08 Apr. 2016.
