= Occoquan =

Occoquan may refer to:

- Occoquan, Virginia
- Occoquan River
- Occoquan Bay National Wildlife Refuge
- Lorton and Occoquan Railroad
- Occoquan Workhouse (prison)
- 1917 imprisonment of suffragettes at the Occoquan workhouse
