= NOVA Wild =

Zoo in Virginia, US

Coordinates: 38°58′21″N 77°18′48″W

NOVA Wild is a 30-acre (12 ha) zoo in Reston, Virginia. The zoo features a self-drive-through Safari with zebras, bison, and llamas, and a walking tour with cheetahs, capybaras, kangaroos, sloths, camel rides, and a bird aviary. The zoo has over 50 species of animals.

== History ==
=== 20th century ===
In 1975, local developer and entrepreneur Mack Slye "Jack" Crippen Jr. opened the Pet-A-Pet Farm on a 60-acre (24.28-hectare) parcel he owned near Lake Fairfax Park, which he had developed in the 1960s and later sold to Fairfax County, Virginia. Crippen had been a collector of exotic animals for a few years, and the closing of ABC's 280-acre (113.31-hectare) Largo Wildlife Preserve in Prince George's County, Maryland and the availability of its menagerie was the trigger for his venture.

After operating Pet-A-Pet for a few years and losing nearly $200,000 in the venture, Crippen decided to close it in 1978, selling off or giving away most of the 500 animals at the petting zoo. The last animal to be rehomed was a 17-year-old female Asian elephant named Topsy, who originally supposed to be sent to the Portland Zoo in February 1979, but the deal fell through and Topsy instead wound up in a circus, where she was euthanized after injuring a trainer.

Mark Smith, an employee of the Zoological Consortium, a professional management group, which had been brought in by Crippen to help dispose of all the animals at Pet-A-Pet, decided to try to reopen the park. Smith was able to find a financial backer in Loudoun businessman Robert D. Johnson, and the new zoo, now named Pet Farm Park, opened in the spring of 1980.

In 1993, Pet Farm Park was renamed Reston Animal Park.

In 1994, Johnson and his wife, Shirley, sued Mack Crippen for violating an agreement over the rental of the park property, but eventually reached an agreement that would allow the couple to continue to rent the property, now reduced to 30 acres (12 hectares), for the next five years.

When the lease ran out in 1999, the Johnsons were not able to reach a new lease agreement with Mack Crippen and moved Reston Animal Park to a rented location on the Sunshine Farms in Loudoun County. Eventually, Johnson would change the name to the Leesburg Animal Park in 2001.

=== 21st century ===
As the zoning for the location required that it be used as either a zoo or become open space, Crippen leased the location to Eric and Janet Mogensen, who moved in new animals and opened the Reston Zoo in the spring of 2000. Following Mack Crippen's death in 2006, the Mogensens bought the property from Crippen's estate in 2009.

In 2012, the Reston Zoo was embroiled in controversy when its director, Meghan Mogensen, was found guilty of illegal possession of animal anesthesia and animal cruelty after drowning a wallaby in a bucket. She was sentenced to 30 days in jail. After appealing a guilty verdict, Mogensen pleaded guilty in January 2013. Part of her plea agreement prohibited her from overseeing animal euthanization.

Prior to opening for the season in March 2016, the Reston Zoo was purchased by Vanessa Stoffel and Jacob Roer, who changed its name to Roer's Zoofari.

On the afternoon of Monday March 8, 2021, a fire burned one of the large two-story barns, killing two giraffes.

On December 30, 2022, local Tara Campbell Lussier purchased the land and Zoo and reopened it as NOVA Wild in the Spring of 2023. NOVA Wild is dedicated to animal welfare, education and conservation and their team has made many improvements and renovations to revitalize Reston's beloved local zoo.
