= Gerry Connolly Cross County Trail =

Hiking trail in Virginia, United States

Coordinates: 38°57′51″N 77°18′41″W

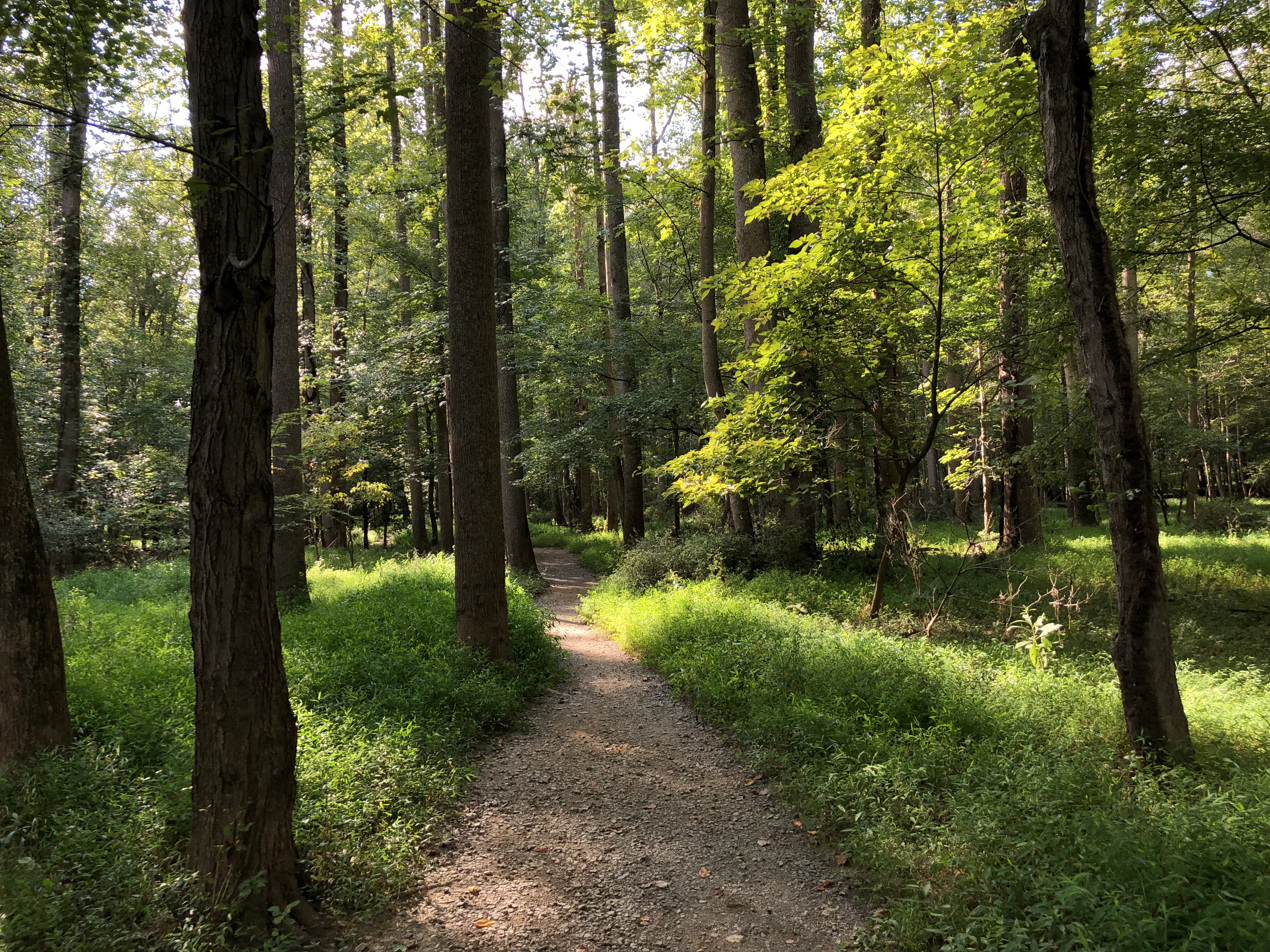
- Cross County Trail in Great Falls Park
- Length: 40.5 mi (65.2 km)
- Location: Virginia, U.S.
- Trailheads: Occoquan Regional Park, Great Falls National Park
- Use: Biking; Horseback riding Running; Hiking
- Highest point: Fairfax Acres, 430 ft (130 m)
- Lowest point: Boat Ramp at Occoquan, 10 ft (3.0 m)
- Difficulty: Easy
- Season: All

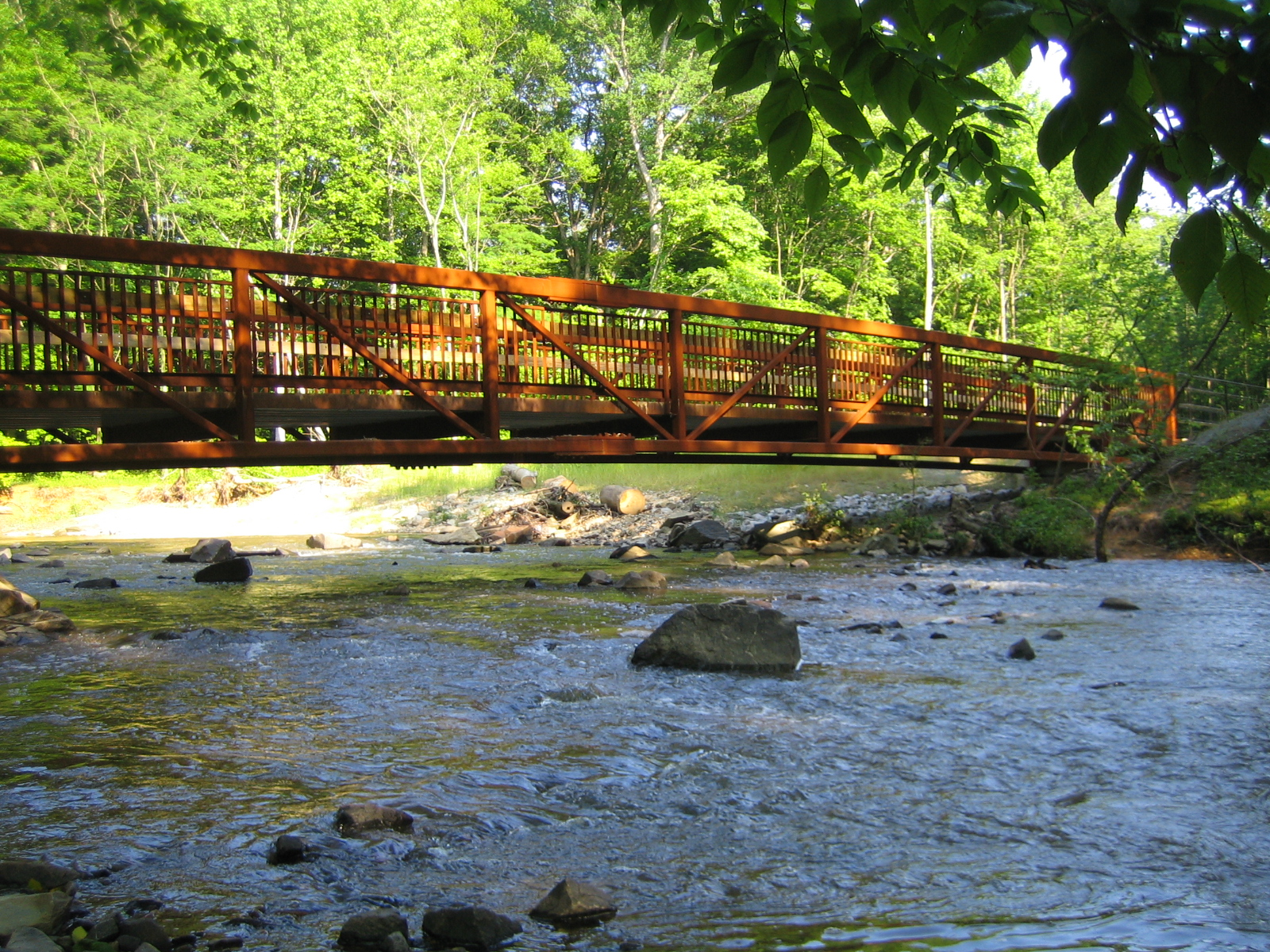
Cross County Trail crossing Accotink Creek

The Gerry Connolly Cross County Trail is a 40.5-mile hiking, biking and bridle trail in Fairfax County, Virginia that traverses the entire length of the county in an arc that begins and ends at different points near the Potomac River. The northern portion of the trail follows Difficult Run, while the southern half largely follows Accotink Creek and Pohick Creek.

== Route ==
The trail is a mix of paved, crushed gravel and natural surface trails that connects to the Potomac Heritage National Scenic Trail and the Washington and Old Dominion Trail. From the north, it starts at the mouth of Difficult Run along the Potomac River in Great Falls National Park and follows Difficult Run southwest, across the Washington and Old Dominion Trail to Oakmont. From there it travels on road over I-66 to Accotink Creek in Fairfax and then follows Accotink Creek to the Daventry area in Springfield. The trail travels west from there to the Pohick Creek valley and follows Pohick Creek southeast to the Laurel Hills area of Lorton. It then goes south, parallel to I-95, and across Rocky Branch to the right-of-way of the old Lorton and Occoquan Railroad. It then uses much of the old right-of-way to reach the Occoquan River.

== History ==
The $6.5 million trail was conceived by hiking enthusiast Bill Niedringhaus, president of Fairfax Trails and Streams, in 1997. He noticed a nearly continuous stretch of publicly owned land across the county which already contained 26.5 miles of discontinuous trail and he presented the idea to the Fairfax County Board of Supervisors at a park bond hearing in 1998, enlisting the support of Gerry Connolly. In 1999, Connolly pitched the idea of building the trail to the County Board after it voted to spend $4.2 million on trails over the next 6 years. Supervisors voted to investigate the matter at the time and a month later attempted to hike across the county over a weekend, but were thwarted by the lack of connections. A month later, in early 2000, the Board voted to spend $100,000 on the first 5 phases on the trail and at the end of the year allocated another $500,000 left over from a budget surplus. The money was needed to acquire 10 parcels, build several connections and construct 10 culverts and 8 fair-weather stream crossings.

The construction of the trail in the early 2000s was the largest construction project in the Fairfax County Park Authority's history and required the purchase of multiple pieces of land. Part of the Accotink Gateway Connector Trail, from Daniels Run to Pickett Road, was opened in 2001 and dedicated at a National Trails Day ceremony on June 5th of that year. In 2002, the county acquired the Lorton Reformatory, the District of Columbia's former prison, which enabled them to connect the trail to the Occoquan. In 2003, the county unveiled the first trail marking sign near Laurel Hill. By 2004, the initial 31.5 miles of the trail were complete. That year the Park Authority bought 3 parcels, accounting for 31.74 acres, in the Accotink stream valley that connected to other park properties and provided a link for the trail. The County Parks Authority began the expansion of the Accotink Stream Valley Trail, from King Arthur Road in Annandale to Wakefield park, which is also part of the Cross County Trail, in May of 2005. It, including three new concrete bridges, was completed in June of that year. The entire trail - between Pohick road in southern Fairfax County and Great Falls - opened on December 17, 2005 with a small ribbon-cutting ceremony. Fairfax County had a larger ceremony and celebration, called "Trailfest", officially opening the trail on May 6, 2006.

In 2008, the Fairfax County Park Authority built a new section of the Accotink Stream Valley Trail/Cross-County Trail between Lake Accotink and Hunter Village Drive.

In 2013, the Fairfax County Board of Supervisors voted to name the trail after Connolly and made it formal at a ceremony held on National Trails Day in 2014.

In 2016-17, as part of the Lorton Road Improvement Project, The Fairfax County Department of Public Works rebuilt the trail as a sidepath along Workhouse Road (nee Old Lorton Road) where it had previously been an on-road facility on Old Lorton. In addition Lorton Road was rebuilt south of its prior location and DPW built a trail tunnel under the new Lorton Road. That project was completed on March 31, 2017.
