= Lake Mooney =

Artificial lake

- Location within Virginia Location within the United States
- Location: Stafford County, Virginia, United States
- Coordinates: 38°20′06″N 077°32′57″W
- Type: Man-made
- Basin countries: United States
- First flooded: 2014
- Surface area: 520 acres (210 ha)
- Water volume: 740,600,000 cu ft (20,970,000 m^{3})
- Shore length^{1}: 33 miles (53 km)
- Surface elevation: 187 ft (57 m)
- Settlements: Fredericksburg
- ^{1} Shore length is not a well-defined measure.

Lake Mooney formerly Rocky Pen Reservoir, is a 520 acres (210 ha) reservoir in Stafford County, Virginia. The lake has 33 miles (53 km) of shore line, forty million US gallons (150,000 m^{3}) of water enter the lake every day from the Rappahannock River. Mooney is the newest lake in Virginia.

== History ==
The lake was opened in 2014. Lake Mooney Reservoir was named on May 29, 2015. The lake was named for Jason Mooney who was a Stafford sheriff's deputy who died in the line of work in 2007. The lake is primarily used as a long-term water supply reservoir for Stafford County, and is also available for recreation. The lake is stocked with game fish and officially opened for sport fishing in July 2017.

== See also ==
List of lakes in the Washington, D.C. area
