= Culler Lake =

Artificial lake

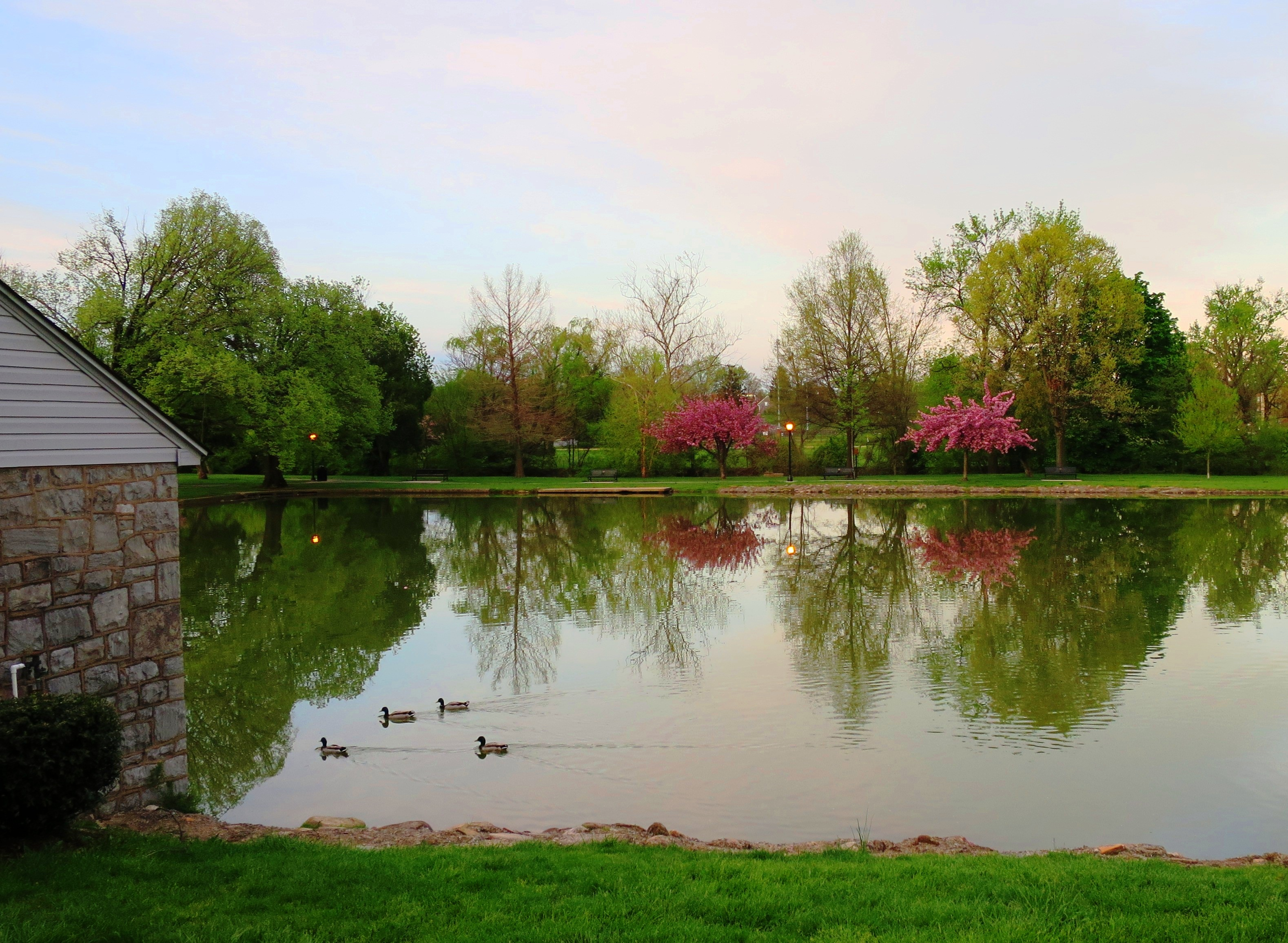
- Morning at Culler Lake

- Location within Maryland Location within the United States
- Location: Frederick, Maryland, United States
- Coordinates: 39°25′03″N 077°25′27″W
- Type: Man-made
- Basin countries: United States
- Surface elevation: 285 ft (87 m)
- Settlements: Frederick

Culler Lake

Culler Lake is a man-made lake in Frederick, Maryland. The lake is used as part of stormwater management and it is also a gathering place for community recreation and it was restored and revitalized in 2016. The lake is located in Baker park.

== History ==
In 1938 the lake was originally called Kidwiler. In 1940 the lake was renamed Culler Lake in honor of Mayor Lloyd Culler. The lake is man made and it serves as part of a stormwater management system that protects downtown Frederick Maryland from flooding. In 2016 the lake was dredged and 500 dump trucks of debris and sediment was removed. The city stocks the lake with fish and festivals are held there.

== See also ==
List of lakes in the Washington, D.C. area
