= Thompson-Kidwell Cemetery =

Historic cemetery in Fairfax County, Virginia, US

Coordinates: 38.9137°N 77.3607°W

Thompson-Kidwell Cemetery is a cemetery located on the grounds of Fox Mill Park in Reston, Virginia. The cemetery dates from the late 19th century and was a burying plot for members of the Thompson and Kidwell families who lived in this area of Fairfax County, Virginia. The cemetery was largely forgotten until the mid-1970s when adjacent neighborhood Fox Mill Woods was built. Even at that point it was located in dense woods only accessible by taking a little-known path from the nearby park. When A. Scott Crossfield Elementary School was built nearby in 1988, the cemetery was cleaned up by the Fairfax County Park Authority, who installed a surrounding fence and a pathway leading from the parking lot of the Park.

24 known graves are known to exist, but due to years of neglect, severe weathering and vandalism no headstones are currently readable. Many of the headstones are broken in pieces and scattered around the grounds.

The cemetery is currently under supervision of the Fairfax County Park Authority.
