= Lorton and Occoquan Railroad =

Overview
- Headquarters: Washington, DC
- Locale: Lorton, Virginia, United States
- Dates of operation: 1911–1977

Technical
- Track gauge: 4 ft 8 1/2 in (1,435 mm) standard gauge

The Lorton and Occoquan Railroad (L&O) was a seven-mile railroad line running between the District of Columbia-operated Lorton Reformatory prison in Lorton, Virginia, and the wharf at Occoquan, Virginia, across the Occoquan River separating Fairfax County and Prince William County. The line operated from 1911 until it was decommissioned in 1977, and most of the rolling stock was sold in 1980. It was powered at various times by cable, steam, and diesel.

== History ==
The main stretch of railroad for the L&O was only about four miles long. Four rail spurs increased the overall length to approximately seven miles in total.

The railroad was used for prisoner transport as well as freight for hauling coal to prison-industry sites and removal of finished products and waste. Prisoners were transported to and from the Richmond, Fredericksburg and Potomac Railroad line at Pohick Creek, and between sites within the Lorton Reformatory grounds, especially between the workhouse and the brickyard and other prison-industry facilities. Although as many as 60 prisoners at a time were aboard trains running along the prison line, no guns were permitted aboard and no shots were ever fired from the train. The railroad maintained two civilian employees to operate the line — an engineer and a track manager — as well as 19 prison inmate workers.

In addition to prisoners, the railroad was used to haul coal to the prison brickyard and to transport finished brick out of the prison. Sewage was also hauled out of the prison by trains prior to the extension of sewer facilities to Lorton by the Fairfax County Water Authority.

In response to prison overcrowding, the District of Columbia purchased ten hospital cars in 1970 that were surplused by the United States Army and parked them on a spur, in order to house additional prisoners without building permanent facilities. The hospital cars were heavily vandalized and security was difficult to maintain in the cars, leading to their abandonment only months after they were placed in use.

In 1977, the railroad ended service as road transport became cheaper than the costs of maintaining and operating the specialized Lorton and Occoquan line. When the engines were sold in 1980, a company in Alabama refurbished them and one remains in service on a tourist line in West Virginia. The trackage was mostly covered by pavement or recycled for scrap, but portions remained visible along various areas of Lorton.

During construction of the I-95 HOV expansion project in the 1980s, the railroad tunnel that went under I-95 and over Pohick Creek was demolished and the tunnel entrances covered over.

In 2005, a little over two miles of the right-of-way was converted into the Gerry Connolly Cross County Trail and a few hundred feet into other trails. The bridge over Giles Run is built on the extant abutments from the railroad and the trail utilizes the old underpass beneath the historic barrel bridge.
