= Gunston Cove =

Coordinates: 38°40′10″N 77°08′55″W

Gunston Cove is an inlet of the Potomac River, at the confluence of Accotink Creek and Pohick Creek in Northern Virginia. The Cove forms the northern boundary of Mason Neck, once home to the revolutionary hero George Mason and now site of several regional parks and the Mason Neck National Wildlife Refuge.

George Mason University's notable multi-decadal study of water quality and aquatic habitat in Gunston Cove and the adjacent Potomac River has illustrated how a tidal freshwater ecosystem can gradually recover from human-induced eutrophication following management of upstream nutrient pollution.
