= Lake Fairfax Park =

Park in Reston, Fairfax County, Virginia

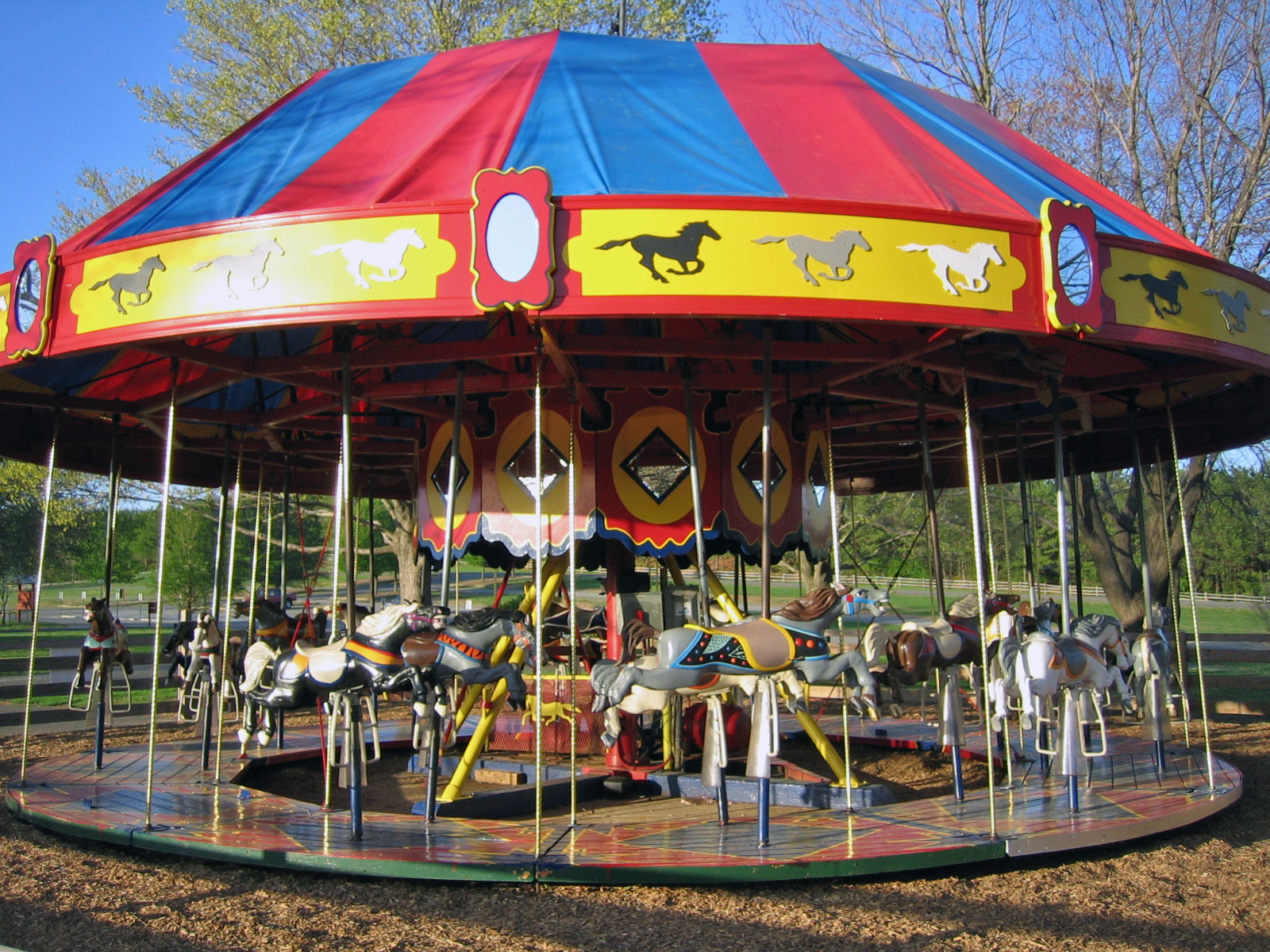
- Interactive map of Lake Fairfax Park
- Location: Reston, Fairfax County, Virginia, USA
- Coordinates: 38°57′52″N 77°19′05″W
- Area: 476 acres (1.93 km^{2})
- Operator: Fairfax County Park Authority
- Status: Open all year
- Website: Official FCPA site

Lake Fairfax Park is a park in Reston, Fairfax County, Virginia, USA owned and maintained by the Fairfax County Park Authority. Contained within the park is the 18-acre (0.073 km^{2}) Lake Fairfax. The park also offers a waterpark, carousel, picnic areas, campgrounds, trails, playground and more.

The park has also played host to music festivals, including Lollapalooza and The HFStival.

== Water Mine ==
The Water Mine is a waterpark contained within Lake Fairfax Park which has over an acre of water play activities surrounded by a lazy river called Rattlesnake River with a 2.5-mile-per-hour (4.0 km/h) current.

== History ==
Lake Fairfax was originally developed as a private recreation facility in the late 1950s - early 1960s by local developer and entrepreneur Mack Slye "Jack" Crippen Jr, the former owner of Roer's Safari, now known as NOVA Wild.

In 1965, James S. Mott and his wife Marguerite were denied entry to the park because they were black. Mott sued Lake Fairfax under the 1964 Civil Rights Act, and Lake Fairfax was enjoined from refusing entry to people on account of their race.

At the end of 1965, the Fairfax County Park Authority expressed interest in purchasing the facility, and Crippen sold Lake Fairfax to the authority in 1966 for $1.7 million.

== See also ==
List of lakes in the Washington, D.C. area
