= Fairfax County Park Authority =

Government department in Virginia, US

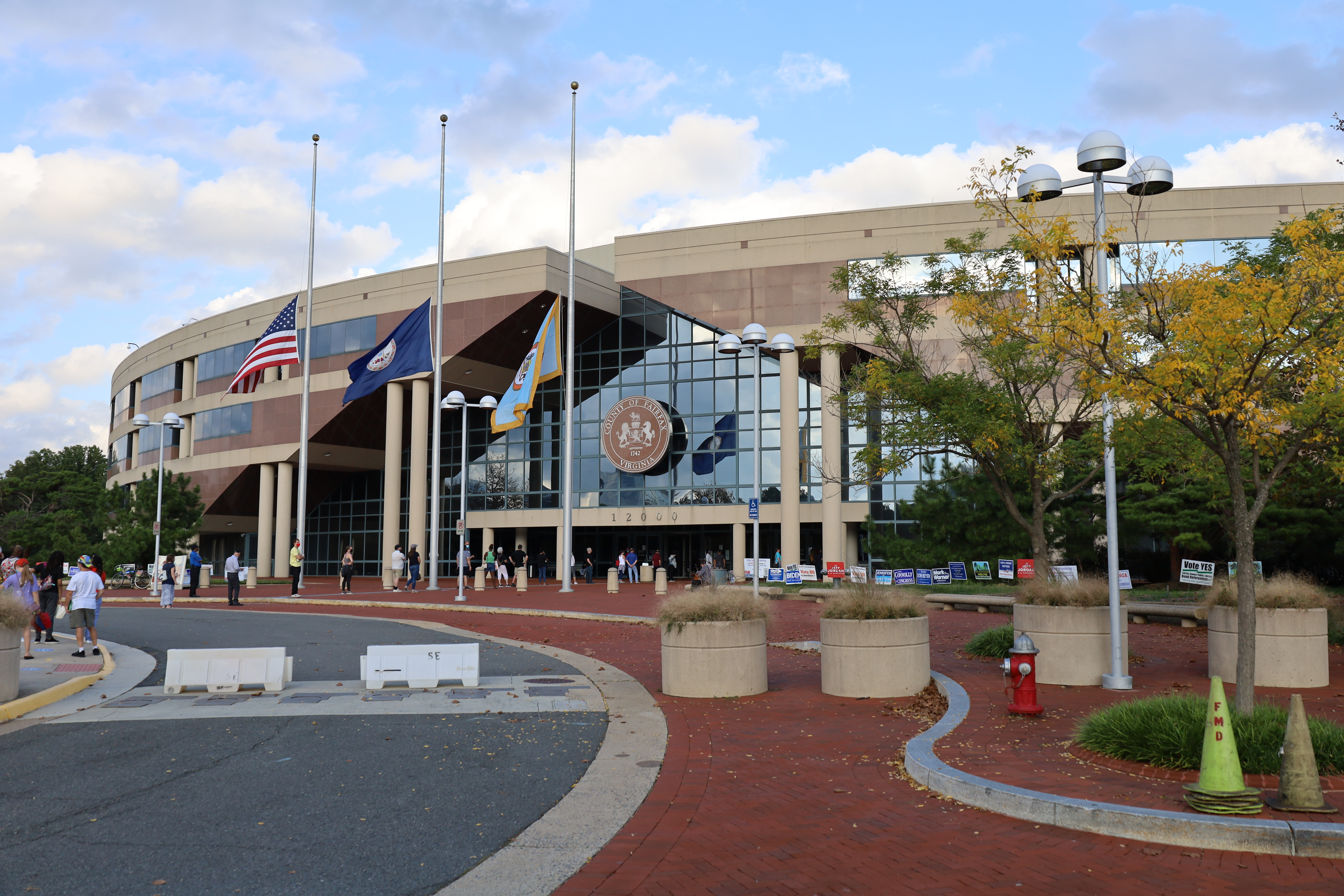
- The Fairfax County Government Center is the park authority's headquarters.

Agency overview
- Formed: 1950
- Type: Authority
- Jurisdiction: Fairfax County, Virginia, U.S.
- Headquarters: Fairfax County Government Center, Fairfax County, Virginia, U.S.
- Agency executive: Jai Cole, Executive Director
- Website: fairfaxcounty.gov/parks/

The Fairfax County Park Authority is the department of the Fairfax County, Virginia government responsible for developing and maintaining the various parks, historical sites, and recreational areas owned or administered by Fairfax County. Figures published as of 2003 indicate that the Park Authority manages over 22,617 acres (92 km^{2}) of parkland.

== History ==
The Fairfax County Board of Supervisors established the Park Authority in 1950 under a provision of the Code of Virginia, with the published goal of providing 15 acres (60,000 m^{2}) of parkland for every 1000 county residents. John W. Brookfield was named to the board of the new authority and elected its first chairman.

In 1953, the county made its first purchase of parkland, 15 acres in Great Falls, for $37,717 from the receivers of the Washington and Old Dominion Railroad. In March 1953, the authority appointed William H. Lindberg as superintendent of parks.

By 1955, the authority had nine public parks, and its budget was $60,000 per year.

In January 1959, Fred M. Packard became the first director of the Fairfax County Park Authority. As director, Packard would work vigorously over the next few years to acquire park land and preserve natural areas in the rapidly developing county.

Under a new county program of acquiring small parks in urban areas, FCPA bought its first neighborhood park, the 9.5-acre Bren Mar Park, in April 1959.

The authority gained control over the disused Fort Belvoir reservoir in March 1960 when it was awarded a 25-year lease to operate the 242-acre site as a public park and recreation facility. The lake was renamed Lake Accotink.

Appointed in November 1961, Joseph Brown became the second director of the Fairfax County Park authority in January 1962.

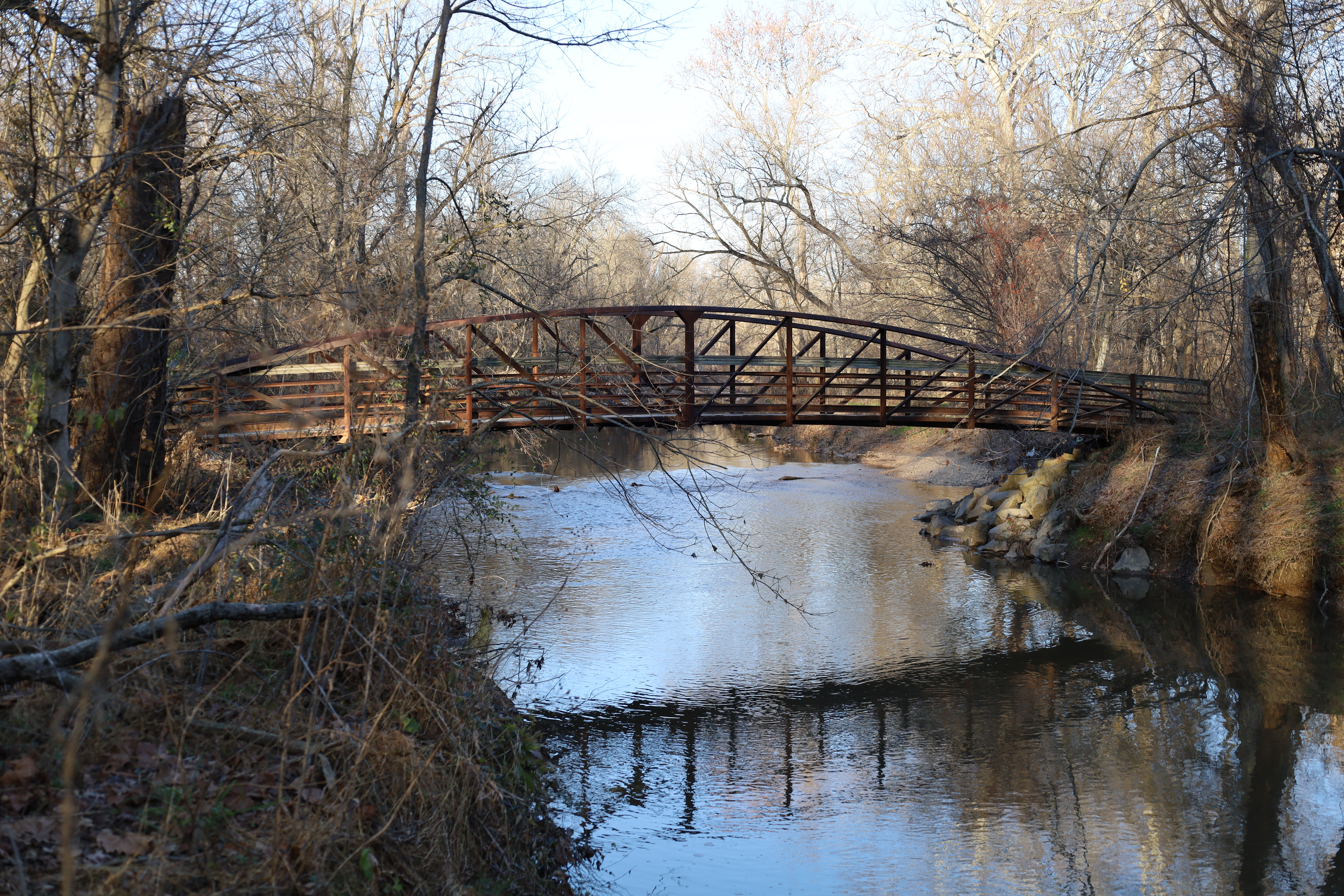
A footbridge in Lake Accotink Park

Lake Accotink was sold by the Army outright to the Fairfax County Park Authority in April 1965 for $176,500 following the property being declared surplus the previous year.

In April 1965, Director Brown was appointed to head the National Park Service's north National Capital area, and assistant director James D. Bell was named to replace him.

The authority purchased Lake Fairfax from its owner, developer Mack Slye "Jack" Crippen Jr., for $1.7 million in 1966.

Columnist and publisher David Lawrence in December 1970 donated a nearly 640-acre tract of land near Centreville worth $5 million to the Authority in respect of the wishes of his late wife, Ellanor C. Lawrence, who had died the previous year. The land became the core of Ellanor C. Lawrence Park.

The approval of a $28.5 million bond issue by county voters in 1971 allowed the authority to purchase 4,400 acres of land over the next five years, adding 39 parks to the system and increasing its total holdings to 10,200 acres by 1976.

James D. Bell was demoted from his position as director of the Park Authority in January 1973 after using park employees to move from the authority-owned house in Great Falls he had been living in. Deputy Director Joseph P. Downs was appointed acting director following Bell's demotion, which also included a more than 30% pay cut from his former $26,972 salary. Downs was permanently appointed as director of the 7,200-acre system in May 1973.

The Federal government agreed in 1974 to give 1,262-acres of land that had been declared surplus the previous December to Fairfax County under the Legacy of Parks program. This vast area would become the Huntley Meadows Park when it was formally deeded to the county the following year.

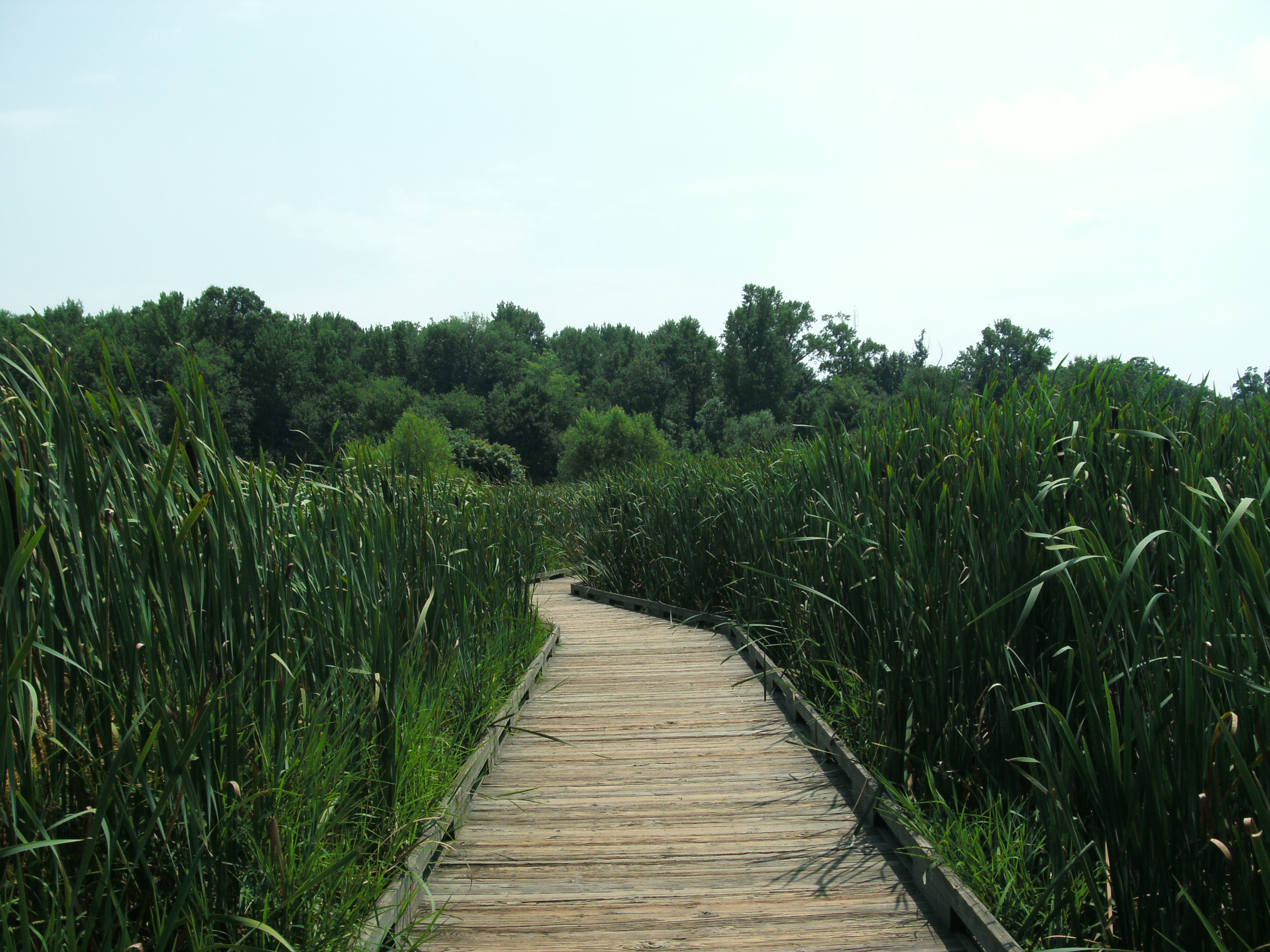
Wetlands and boardwalk in Huntley Meadows Park

By 1986, the authority had 342 parks and 14,360 acres under its control.

In 1986, the Fairfax County Board of Supervisors sought to exercise greater control over the county's parks. Faced with the potential loss of the Park Authority's charter, the Park Authority Board voted 5–3 in April 1986 to give up its power to appoint its employees and enter into contracts to the county Board of Supervisors. Even with this concession, the Board of Supervisors at their April 7 meeting only voted to extend the Park Authority's charter through May 19, awaiting a decision by Virginia Attorney General Mary Sue Terry as to the legality of the Board's actions. Fairfax County Executive J. Hamilton Lambert was appointed as executive director of the Park Authority in addition to his role as county executive.

After 16 years as director of the Fairfax County Park Authority, Joseph P. Downs resigned in 1989 to take a position with the Fairfax County Economic Development Authority. William C. Beckner took over as director of the Park Authority. Kirk Kincannon was the most recent director, serving from 2014 to 2021.

As of 2003, the Park Authority had at least 22,617 acres (92 km^{2}) of parkland under Park Authority oversight for a resulting 23 acres (93,000 m^{2}) of parkland per 1000 county residents.

The Park Authority dedicated its first urban park, the 16,000 square foot Merrifield Park civic plaza, in June 2009.

== Operations ==
The authority officially classifies parks in its system as local parks, district parks, countywide parks or resource-based parks. Additionally, the authority uses the classification of regional parks for those parks and facilities administered by the Northern Virginia Regional Park Authority.

In addition to numerous local parks, which are generally less than 50 acres (200,000 m^{2}), the Park Authority also manages nine recreation centers (Cub Run, George Washington, Lee District, Mount Vernon, Oakmont, Providence, South Run, Spring Hill, and Audrey Moore/Wakefield) in several of its district parks. The authority also owns seven golf courses (Oakmont, Pinecrest, Jefferson, Burke Lake, Greendale, Laurel Hill, and Twin Lakes), as well as over 200 acres (0.81 km^{2}) of trails.

Fairfax County has adopted a program to both link the various existing trails and to acquire new land for trails with the goal of creating a county-wide network of pedestrian trails.

== Governance ==
In terms of political structure and oversight, the Fairfax County Park Authority reports an independent board including twelve members appointed by the Fairfax County Board of Supervisors, the Fairfax County Park Authority Board, although appointment of the Director of the Park Authority is subject to approval by the Fairfax County Board of Supervisors (the highest governing body of Fairfax County).

The twelve members of the Board comprise nine members respectively representing the nine magisterial districts of Fairfax County, as well as three at-large members.

Public meetings of the Board are held on the second and fourth Wednesdays of each month at 7:30 in the Herrity Building of the Fairfax County Government Center.

== See also ==
- Huntley Meadows Park, the largest park overseen by the Authority
- Eakin Community Park, part of the land that became Fairfax County's very first park
- Thompson-Kidwell Cemetery, a cemetery maintained by the Authority.
