= Accotink Bay Wildlife Refuge =

Nature preserve in Virginia, US

Accotink Bay Wildlife Area
- IUCN category IV (habitat/species management area)
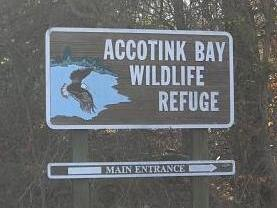
- Entrance to Accotink Bay Wildlife Refuge
- Interactive map of Accotink Bay Wildlife Area
- Location: Fairfax County, Virginia, United States
- Nearest city: Springfield, Virginia
- Coordinates: 38.69444°N 77.15417°W
- Area: 1,200 acres (4.9 km^{2})
- Established: 1979
- Governing body: United States Army

Accotink Bay Wildlife Refuge is a nature preserve on the grounds of Fort Belvoir in Fairfax County, Virginia, United States. Several other parks, including Mason Neck State Park, Pohick Bay Regional Park, and the Jackson Miles Abbott Wetland Refuge are located nearby.

The refuge was established in 1979 to protect sensitive wetlands and wildlife habitats associated with Accotink Bay and to provide opportunities for environmental education and low-intensity recreation. The refuge offers more than eight miles of hiking trails, including a short paved trail for handicapped access.

Species native to the preserve include:

- Foxes
- Deer
- American toads
- Raccoons
- Black rat snakes
- Eastern box turtles
- Various millipedes, including Narceus americanus
- Various salamanders, including spotted salamanders and red back salamanders
- Various spiders, including Lycosa aspersa

The Accotink Bay Wildlife Refuge Environmental Education Center is located at the entrance to the refuge. The center features exhibits, videos and trail guides about the refuge and offers nature education programs.

A small parking area with space for six cars (two reserved for handicapped) is located just outside the Tulley Gate entrance off Route 1.
