= Accotink Creek =

Accotink Creek Tributary to Potomac River
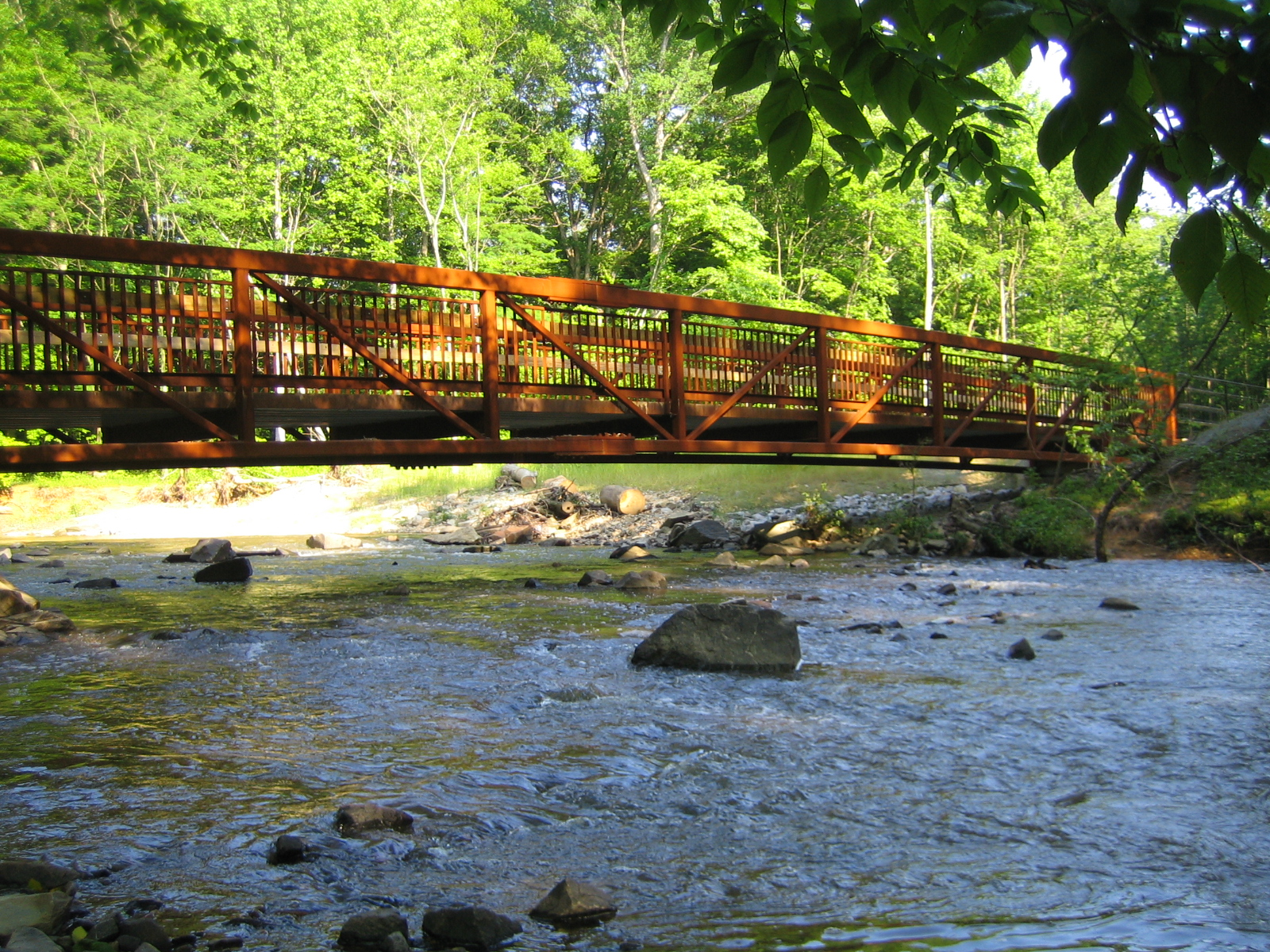
- Cycling trail over Accotink Creek

- Location within Virginia Location within the United States

Location
- Country: United States
- State: Virginia
- County: Fairfax
- City: Fairfax

Physical characteristics
- Source: Difficult Run divide
  - location: Cobbdale, Virginia
  - coordinates: 38°51′05″N 077°19′18″W
  - elevation: 360 ft (110 m)
- Mouth: Potomac River (Accotink Bay)
  - location: Fort Belvior Military Reservation
  - coordinates: 38°41′56″N 077°09′40″W
  - elevation: 0 ft (0 m)
- Length: 23.86 mi (38.40 km)
- Basin size: 52.83 square miles (136.8 km^{2})
- Discharge
  - location: Potomac River (Accotink Bay)
  - average: 61.46 cu ft/s (1.740 m^{3}/s) at mouth with Potomac River

Basin features
- Progression: southeast
- River system: Potomac River
- Tributaries
  - left: Bear Run; Long Branch; Flag Run; Calomo Branch; Field Lark Branch; Long Branch
  - right: Crock Branch; Turkey Run; Long Branch
- Waterbodies: Lake Accotink
- Bridges: Hill Street, Scott Drive, Warwick Avenue, US 29, Keith Avenue, Rust Hill Place, Chain Bridge Road, University Drive, US 50 (x2), Old Lee Hwy, Pickett Road, Barkley Drive, Prosperity Avenue, Woodburn Road, King Arthur Road, Accotink Drive, VA 236, VA 620, Old Keene Mill Road, VA 289, Hooes Road, Barta Road, VA 286, Fullerton Road, I-95, Telegraph Road, Ehlers Road, John J. Kingman Road, US 1, Poe Road

Accotink Creek is a 25.0-mile-long (40.2 km) tributary stream of the Potomac River in Fairfax County, Virginia, in the United States. At Springfield, Virginia, Accotink Creek is dammed to create Lake Accotink. The stream empties into the Potomac at Gunston Cove's Accotink Bay, to the west of Fort Belvoir.

== Variant names ==
According to the Geographic Names Information System, it has also been known historically as:

- Accotonck Creek
- Main Branch

== Course ==
Accotink Creek rises near the intersection of Rt. 66 and Rt. 123 in Fairfax County, Virginia. Accotink Creek then flows southeast to meet the Potomac River in Accotink Bay at Fort Belvoir Military Reservation.

== Watershed ==
Accotink Creek drains 52.82 square miles (136.8 km^{2}) of area, receives about 43.7 in/year of precipitation, has a topographic wetness index of 436.37 and is about 22.5% forested.

== See also ==
- List of crossings of Accotink Creek
- Accotink, Virginia
- List of rivers of Virginia

== Maps ==
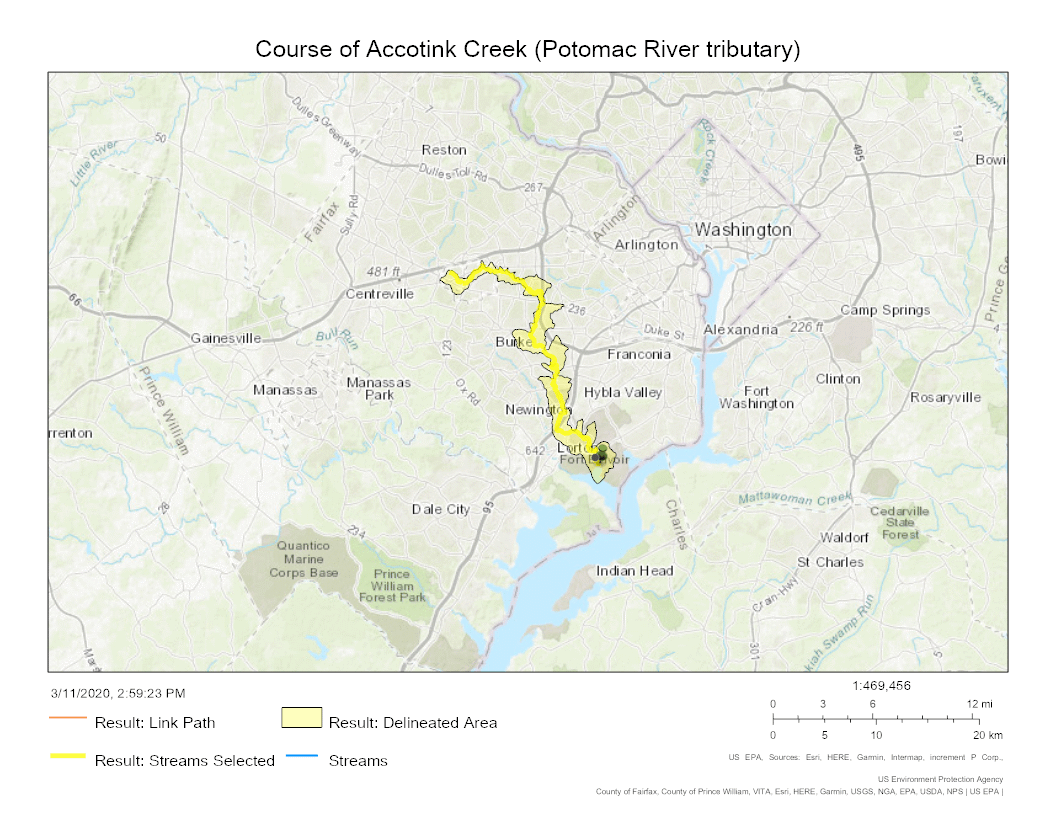
Course of Accotink Creek (Potomac River tributary)

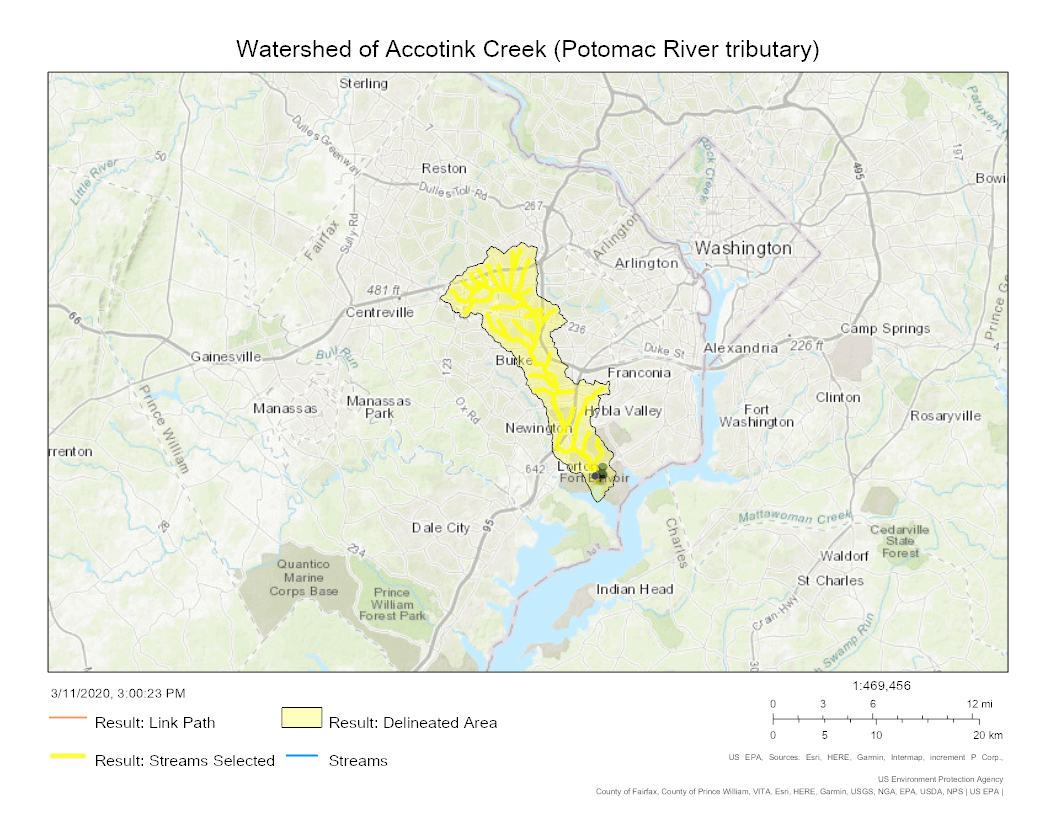
Watershed of Accotink Creek (Potomac River tributary)
