= Lake Accotink =

Reservoir in North Springfield, Virginia USA

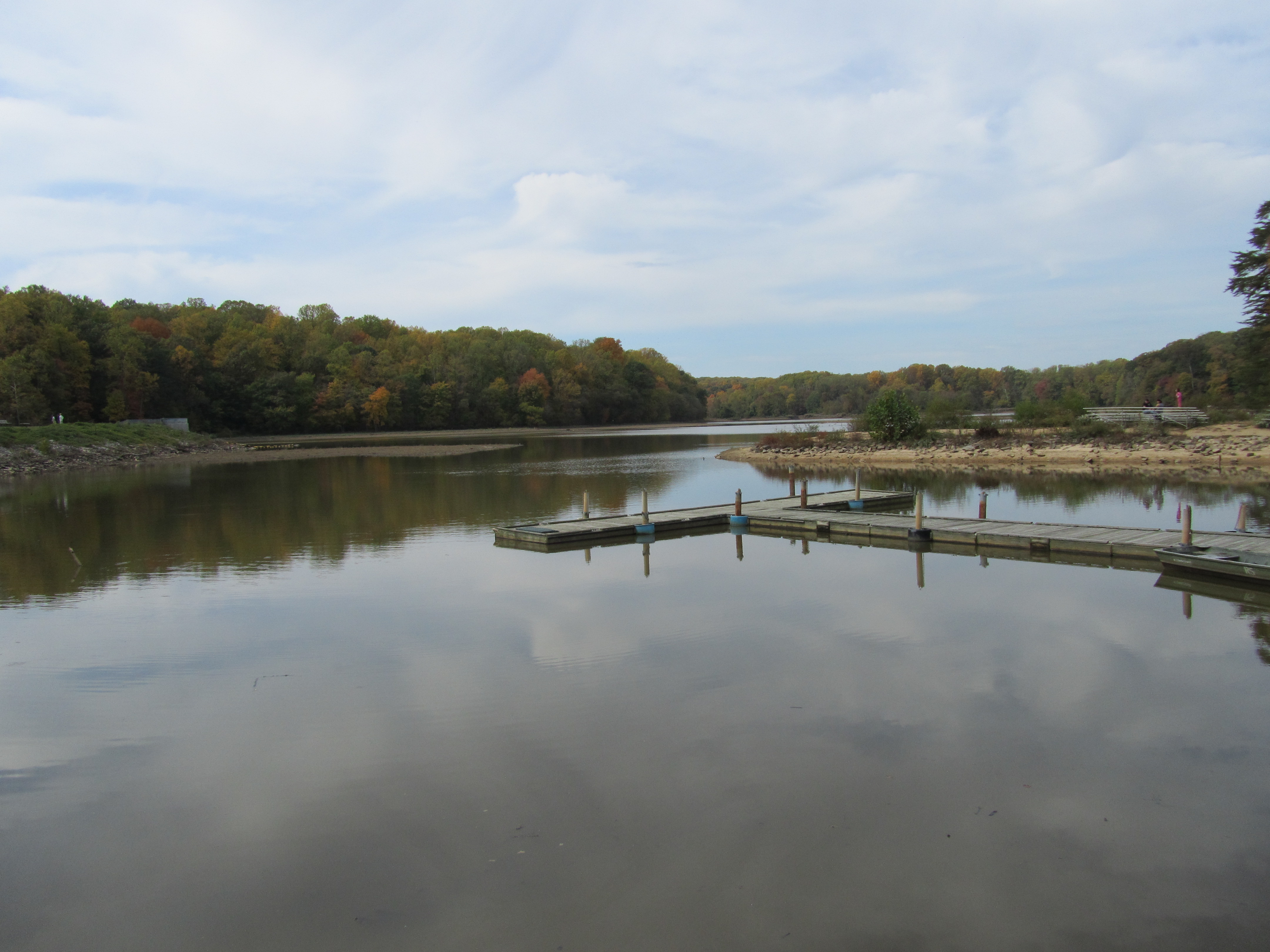
- Lake Accotink

- Location within Virginia Location within the United States
- Location: Fairfax County, Virginia
- Coordinates: 38°47′35″N 77°13′06″W
- Type: reservoir
- Primary inflows: Accotink Creek
- Primary outflows: Accotink Creek
- Basin countries: United States
- Surface area: 48.1 acres (19.5 ha)
- Surface elevation: 184 ft (56 m)

Lake Accotink Park
- Interactive map of Lake Accotink Park
- Location: Springfield, Fairfax County, Virginia, United States
- Area: 493-acre (2.00 km^{2})
- Operator: Fairfax County Park Authority
- Status: Open all year
- Website: Official site

Lake Accotink is a reservoir in North Springfield in Fairfax County, Virginia, United States. Lake Accotink is formed by the damming of Accotink Creek. The lake is surrounded by Lake Accotink Park.

== The lake ==
The lake is 48.1 acres (19.5 ha), and the surrounding park is 493 acres (200 ha). The primary inflow and outflow is Accotink Creek, which is dammed on the south side, near a Norfolk Southern railway trestle. During 2010, the dam underwent construction.

== Recreation ==
The park has bikes, canoes, paddleboats, and rowboats available for rent. Visitors can also ride tour boats, or walk or run the 3.75 miles (6.04 km) trail loop around the lake. Other trails stretch beyond the park and connect to the Cross County Trail, with its running trails and mountain biking trail. A miniature golf course surrounds an antique carousel near the south entrance to the park. Gas-powered motorboats are not allowed on the lake.

== Wildlife ==
Lake Accotink hosts a great variety of wildlife. Waterfowl such as great blue herons, ducks, and Canada geese float on the water. Birds like seagulls, American robins, swifts, swallows, osprey, and occasionally bald eagles inhabit the park. Along the edges of the lake, red foxes, white-tailed deer, beaver dams, common watersnakes, and skinks are frequently found.

== History ==
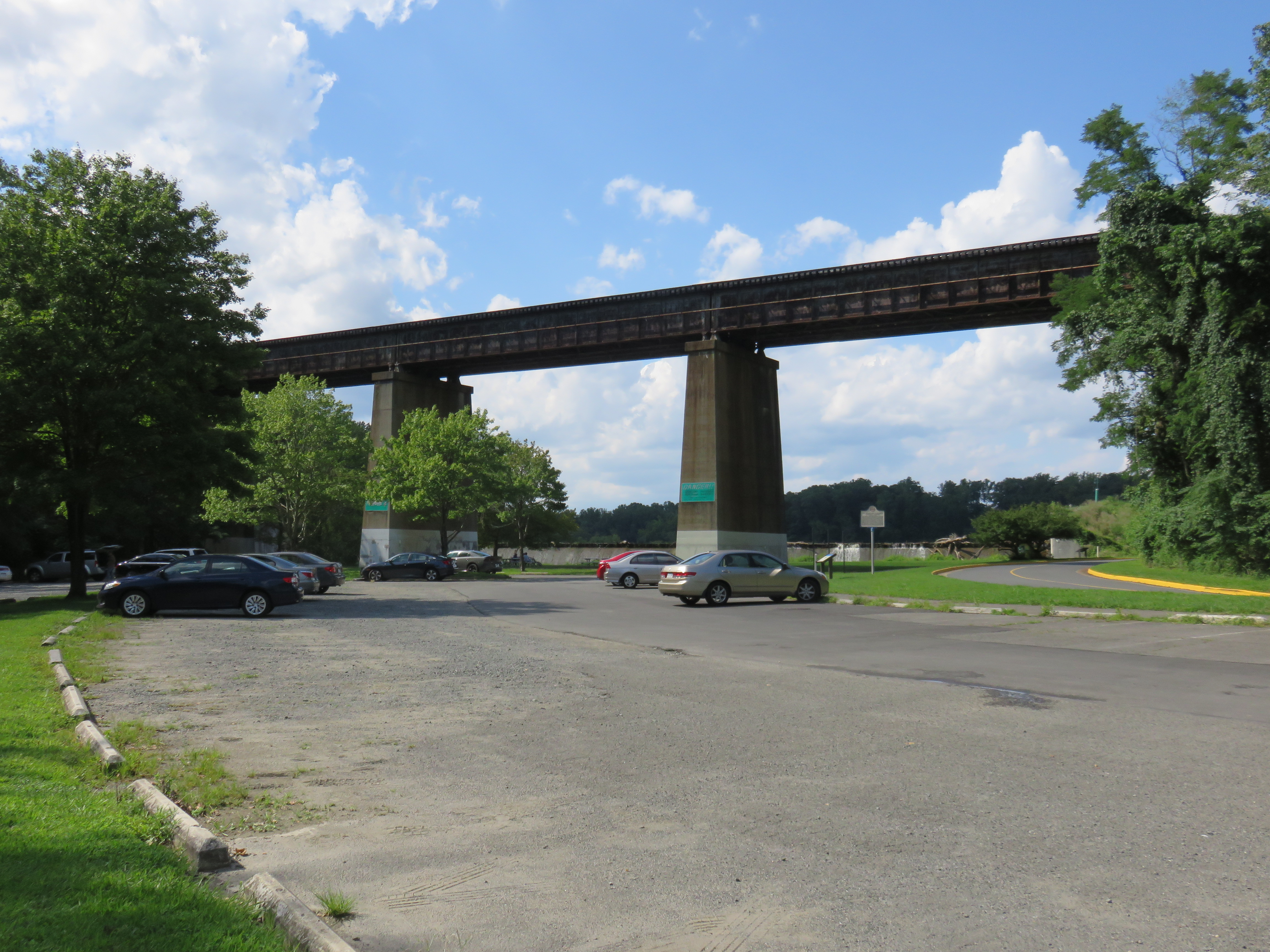
The Norfolk Southern Railway Washington District crosses the valley just downstream of the dam forming Lake Accotink.

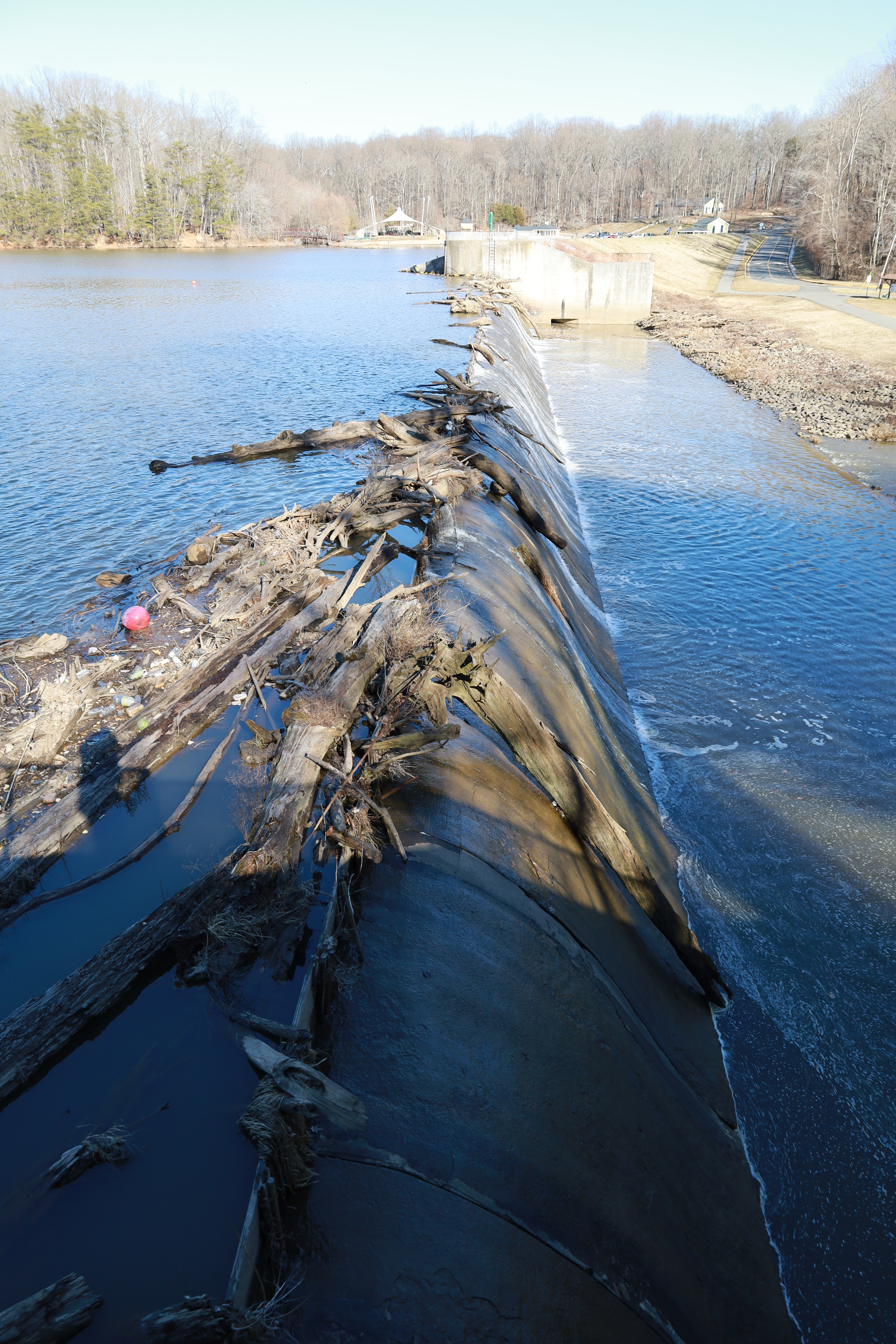
View along the dam

Lake Accotink was constructed in 1943-44 by the U.S. Army as a reservoir for Fort Belvoir. The dam impounding the Accotink Creek was built on the site of a previous dam which had existed for that same purpose from 1918 to 1922.

The discharge of sewage treatment plants in Fairfax and Vienna into the Accotink Creek eventually led to the contamination of the water to the point where it was no longer fit for drinking, and the Army sought to dispose of the reservoir.

The area had been open to recreational use previously, but the Army's discontinuing use of the reservoir led to closing of the site, as guards were no longer posted. After the land and reservoir were officially declared as surplus, Fairfax County in 1958 expressed its interest in acquiring the land and reservoir for use as a public park and recreation area.

Although the reservoir had previously been declared surplus, the Army decided it wanted to retain title to the property in case of future need. In March 1960, Fairfax was awarded a 25-year license to develop the lake for public park and recreational use. Shortly thereafter, the reservoir was officially renamed Lake Accotink.

In 1964, Lake Accotink was declared surplus and put up for auction. The Fairfax County Park Authority was the high bidder, and officially purchased the 242-acre tract, including the 100-acre lake, for $176,500 in April 1965.

Fairfax County Park Authority Director James D. Bell closed Lake Accotink in June 1970 when samples taken from Accotink Creek above the lake were found to be so contaminated with intestinal bacteria from the City of Fairfax's overloaded sewage treatment plant that the water was a health hazard. Following the closure of the Fairfax City sewage plant and the connection of the city to the county's sewer system in February 1971, Director Bell announced a plan to drain, refill and restock the lake with fish.

Despite the closure of the sewage plant and the draining and refilling of the lake, tests still showed the lake as being too polluted to use, as runoff from development had silted the 80-acre lake and trapped the filth in sediment. The lake was finally opened in July 1971, although only for boating and fishing, as it was still too polluted to swim in.

In September 2014, the Fairfax County Board of Supervisors funded a $179,000 study of Lake Accotink Park, resulting in various options proposed for controlling sedimentation that include eliminating or significantly reducing the size of the lake. In 2018, in response to the possibility that the lake might be eliminated or reduced in size, a group of concerned citizens formed a 501(c)(3) organization, Save Lake Accotink. On September 19, 2019, the Park Authority announced its recommendation to dredge the lake to eight foot depth so as to preserve the recreational use of the lake. Local government meetings were held in February 2023, stating that the dredging project would cost Fairfax County roughly 400 million dollars over the next 25 years. As a result, the Fairfax County Department of Public Works and Environmental Services suggested at the time that the county not undergo the dredging operation. As of December 2023 the Board of Supervisors is evaluating the Lake Accotink Findings Report of a community task force chaired by Sharon Bulova, which recommended dredging the lake.

== Incidents ==
On June 3, 1961, 4-year-old Kevin Kilduff drowned in the spillway after wandering off from a picnic with his mother. The boy was taken to the Alexandria Hospital, where he was pronounced dead.

45-year-old Merrill J. Fogle drowned in the lake on the night of July 5, 1976 when the boat in which he and two friends were in overturned and he disappeared while swimming for the shore. Fogle was found by rescue divers early the next morning and was taken to Fairfax Hospital, where he was pronounced dead.

On May 29, 1993, 8-month old Mario Roberto Sierra drowned in the lake when the canoe he was riding in capsized. Sierra was not wearing a life jacket. His corpse was recovered the following day, about 200 yards from shore.

On July 12, 1997, Eric A. Barcia, a fast-food worker, taped a bunch of bungee cords together, wrapped an end around one foot, anchored the other end to the trestle at train bridge, jumped off and was found dead early in the morning.

== See also ==
Accotink Creek
