= Middlegate =

Middlegate, Middle Gate, or MiddleGate may refer to:

== Buildings ==
- Middle Gate School, an elementary school in Newton, Connecticut, United States
- Middlegate, a house located in Ellanor C. Lawrence Park in Chantilly, Virginia, United States

== Cities and towns ==
- Middlegate, Nevada, United States
- Middlegate, Norfolk Island, Australia
- Middlegate Village, a master-planned community in Copperfield, Texas, United States

== Other ==
- Middle Gate (Piraeus), one of the city gates in the wall of Piraeus, Athens, Greece
- MiddleGate Books, a series of children's fantasy books by Rae Bridgman
- Middlegate Formation, a geologic formation in Nevada, United States
- Middlegate Japanese Gardens, a Japanese garden in Pass Christian, Mississippi, United States
