= Dean Dinwoodey =

Dean Dinwoodey (November 12, 1899 – February 7, 1983) was an American Mormon missionary who was the first president and chairman of BNA (The Bureau of National Affairs, Inc., now Bloomberg Industry Group) and a noted intellectual property law scholar. The Dean Dinwoodey Center for Intellectual Property Studies at George Washington University in Washington, D.C., bears his name.

Dinwoodey was born in Idaho Falls, Idaho and received his bachelor's degree from the University of Utah. He attended George Washington University Law School, and during that period took a job at the fledgling BNA. BNA was conceived and established by noted newsman David Lawrence, founder of U.S. News & World Report, to report on the inner workings of Washington.

Dinwoodey was a Latter-day Saint. He served a three-year mission in Germany for the Church of Jesus Christ of Latter-day Saints.

In 1946, when Lawrence wanted to devote his energies to the magazine, he sold BNA to his five top editors. Dean Dinwoodey, together with John D. Stewart (BNA), Ed Donnell, Adolph Magidson, and John Taylor opened up ownership in BNA to the other 279 full-time and 49 part-time employees, founding one of the nation's first wholly employee-owned corporations.

Over the 31 years that Dinwoodey was BNA's chief executive, he was appointed by President Harry Truman during the Korean War to serve on the three-man Salary Stabilization Board, was awarded an honorary law degree from Brigham Young University, and later received the University of Utah's distinguished alumnus award.

Dinwoodey was interested in the developing field of intellectual property law. The Dinwoodey Center, part of the university’s National Law Center, supports research and programmes on domestic and international intellectual property issues.

He was the brother-in-law to Annette Richardson Dinwoodey.

== Sources ==
- page of Dinwoodey center that explains who Dinwoodey was
