= Bloomberg Industry Group =

Legal, tax and regulatory news company

Bloomberg Industry Group, Inc.

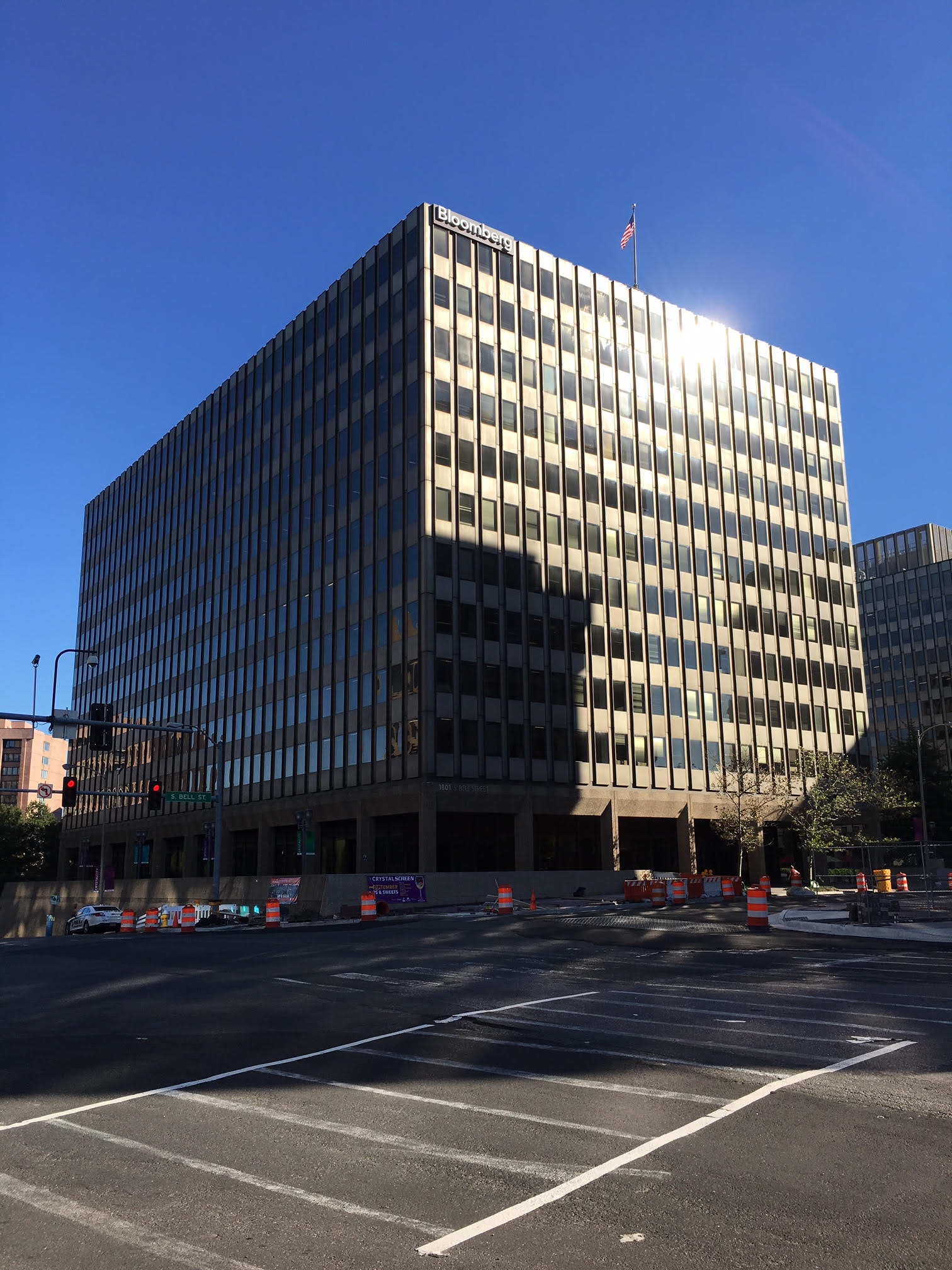
- The Bloomberg Industry Group building in Crystal City, Virginia
- Type: Subsidiary
- Industry: Legal, Tax, Government, Environment & Business news
- Founded: 1929; 97 years ago
- Founder: David Lawrence
- Headquarters: Crystal City, Virginia, Arlington County, U.S.
- Key people: Josh Eastright (CEO)
- Number of employees: 1300+ (2024)
- Parent: Bloomberg, L.P.
- Divisions: Bloomberg Government; Bloomberg Law; Bloomberg Tax & Accounting
- Website: www.bloombergindustry.com

Bloomberg Industry Group, Inc. (formerly known as Bloomberg BNA, The Bureau of National Affairs, Inc., and BNA) is an affiliate of Bloomberg L.P. and a source of legal, tax, regulatory, and business news and information for professionals. It is headquartered in the Crystal City section of Arlington County, Virginia. The CEO of the company is Josh Eastright.

The company was founded in 1929 by David Lawrence and became employee-owned in 1947. When it was acquired by Bloomberg in September 2011, it was the oldest employee-owned company in the United States.

== History ==
=== Early history (1929–2011) ===
The Bureau of National Affairs, Inc. (BNA) was founded in 1929 by newsman David Lawrence as a subsidiary of United States Daily, now known as the U.S. News & World Report. BNA's first publication was U.S. Patent, Trademark & Copyright Reports (now United States Patent Quarterly). In 1946, Lawrence sold BNA to five of his top editors: Dean Dinwoodey, John D. Stewart, Ed Donnell, Adolph Magidson and John Taylor. The editors opened up ownership to the rest of their BNA colleagues and from 1947 until 2011, the company was owned entirely by current and former employees.

Tax Management, Inc., a subsidiary of Bloomberg BNA, was founded in 1959 by Leonard Silverstein to provide tax analysis in the form of the Tax Management Portfolios. The company has published over 500 Portfolios and now offers research, news, practice tools, and guidance for tax attorneys, CPAs, corporate tax managers, estate planners, and financial accountants. It offers federal, state, international tax and accounting services. Tax Management, Inc., is fully integrated into Bloomberg Industry Group and is based in Arlington, Virginia.

=== Recent history (2011–present) ===
On August 25, 2011, Bloomberg L.P announced it would purchase BNA for an estimated $990 million. The transaction closed in late September 2011 at which time Bloomberg paid $39.50 a share in cash through a tender offer to BNA's employee owners. Bloomberg purchased BNA to bolster its existing Bloomberg Government, Bloomberg Law and Bloomberg News services and integrated BNA's vast databases and deep reporting of policy into its news and online products.

In January 2014, Bloomberg BNA took over day-to-day operations of Bloomberg Law. On July 1, 2017, Bloomberg Government officially became part of Bloomberg BNA. On September 3, 2019, Bloomberg BNA changed its name to Bloomberg Industry Group.

=== Timeline ===
- 1926 – Publisher David Lawrence launches The United States Daily, a daily newspaper of record covering the effects of government on business.
- 1929 – U.S. Patent, Trademark & Copyright Reports; BNA's first publication launched March 4 (today called United States Patents Quarterly).
- 1933 – The United States Daily folds in the aftermath of President Franklin Roosevelt's "bank holiday;" converts into a weekly. The United States News - Law Journal launched (later U.S. Law Week, under the BNA name).
- 1941 – Daily Report on Price and Production Controls begins in April; it is the only privately produced publication to receive an unlimited allocation of paper during World War II.
- 1947 – BNA begins operation as an employee-owned company under President Dean Dinwoodey; the National Labor Relations Board certifies the American Newspaper Guild as the bargaining agent for BNA employees (Bloomberg Industry Group employees are now covered by the Washington-Baltimore News Guild).
- 1959 – BNA subsidiary Tax Management, Inc. is founded.
- 1970 – Environment Reporter is launched eight days after the first Earth Day.
- 1984 - BNA acquired the legal publisher Pike & Fisher.
- 1993 – BNA's Health Care Publishing Division is launched.
- 2007 – BNA moves corporate headquarters from the West End of Washington, DC to Arlington, Virginia.
- 2011 – Bloomberg L.P. announces intent to purchase BNA for an estimated $990 million.
- 2012 – Bloomberg L.P. announces appointment of Greg McCaffery as CEO and President of Bloomberg BNA.
- 2014 – Bloomberg Law becomes part of Bloomberg BNA.
- 2017 – Bloomberg L.P. announces that Bloomberg Government will become part of Bloomberg BNA.
- 2019 – Bloomberg BNA announces name change to Bloomberg Industry Group.
- 2026 – Bloomberg Industry Group announces acquisition of Regology, the leading global regulatory intelligence platform.

== Products and services ==
Bloomberg Industry Group produces news publications in a broad array of topics. The company offers solutions to practitioners in the areas of law, tax and accounting, government affairs, government contracting, and environment, health and safety. The company's network of more than 2,500 reporters, correspondents, and leading practitioners publish practical analysis, news, practice tools, and guidance.

=== Legal and Bloomberg Law ===
Bloomberg Law is a subscription-based product for online legal research. The platform, which Bloomberg L.P. introduced in 2009, provides legal content, proprietary company information and news to attorneys, law students, and other legal professionals. The service integrates Bloomberg L.P. news with Bloomberg BNA's primary and secondary legal content and business development tools, as well as tools to analyze case law, corporate representation, and judicial history. Features include Litigation and Dockets, Legal and Financial Analytics, Business Development Center, Practice Tools and News and Law Reports. In 2014, Bloomberg Law moved under the umbrella of Bloomberg Industry Group.

=== Tax, Accounting, and Payroll ===
Bloomberg Industry Group provides tax guidance resources to accounting, corporate and legal professionals that specialize in tax planning and compliance. As part of many of its tax and accounting research products, Bloomberg Industry Group offers more than 500 "Tax Management Portfolios" written by outside practitioners on key tax planning, transactional, jurisdictional, or financial accounting issues. Each Portfolio includes an analysis of the alternative approaches to a certain issue, worksheets and a practice tools section, sample forms, primary sources and a bibliography.

Bloomberg Industry Group serves the professional payroll marketplace through products such as Payroll Administration Guide and Bloomberg Tax & Accounting's International Payroll Country Primers. The company's payroll products include news on U.S. and international payroll developments, strategic white papers, and customized research answers.

=== Government Affairs and Government Contracting ===
Bloomberg Industry Group offers news, information, and analytics to government affairs and government contracting professionals through Bloomberg Government.

=== Regulatory Compliance ===
Bloomberg Industry Group provides regulatory intelligence and regulatory change management through Regology, an AI-powered RegTech platform used by legal, compliance, risk, and operations teams to monitor laws, regulations, and regulatory updates across jurisdictions. The platform helps organizations identify relevant regulatory changes, map them to business obligations and controls, manage workflows, and maintain compliance with applicable requirements. Regology serves companies in highly regulated industries that need to track global, federal, state, and local regulatory developments and assess their impact on products, services, policies, and operations.

== Corporate citizenship ==
Bloomberg Industry Group provides support to a variety of charities and community organizations, including Arlington Food Assistance Center, DC Central Kitchen, Martha's Table, and Humane Rescue Alliance. It supports the Legal Aid Society of the District of Columbia by offering complimentary access to Bloomberg Law. Michael Bloomberg, the founder of Bloomberg Industry Group's parent company formed the charitable foundation Bloomberg Philanthropies in 2006. According to the organization's mission statement, Bloomberg Philanthropies focuses on public health, environment, education, government innovation and the arts.

== Notable products and publications ==

- Bloomberg Law
- Bloomberg Government
- Daily Tax Report
- Daily Labor Report
- Environment & Energy Report
- Occupational Safety & Health Reporter
- Tax Management Portfolios
- United States Patents Quarterly
- United States Law Week
- Regology
