= Bloomberg Government =

News and business analysis division

- Type: Division
- Industry: Information services
- Founded: 2011
- Headquarters: Washington, D.C.
- Key people: Arielle Elliott (President)
- Owner: Bloomberg Industry Group
- Parent: Bloomberg L.P.
- Website: about.bgov.com

Bloomberg Government is a division of Bloomberg Industry Group that provides data-driven decision tools, news, and analytics in a digital workspace for professionals who influence government action.

== History ==
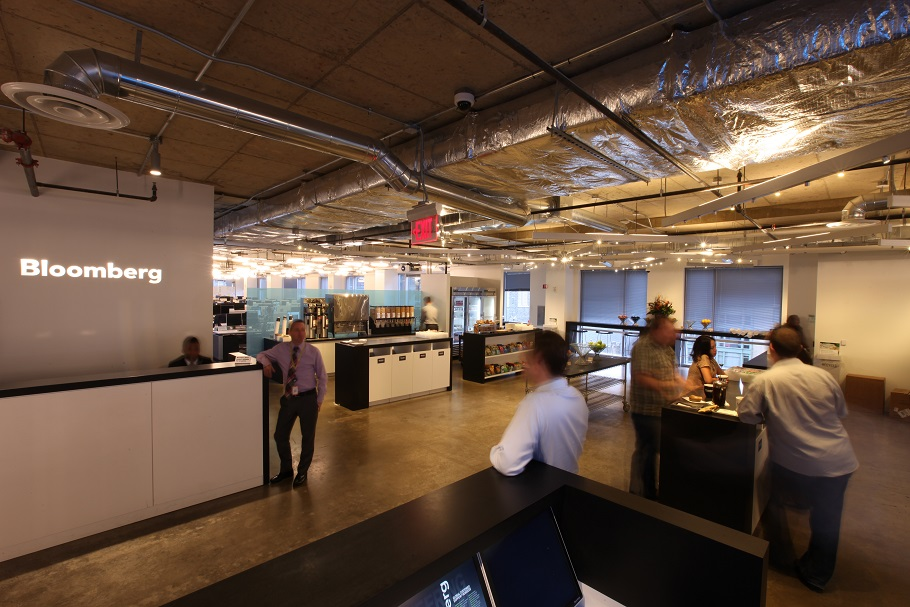
The entrance to the Bloomberg Government offices in Washington, DC

Bloomberg Government launched in 2011 as a comprehensive solution to eliminate multiple government information resources. According to The New York Times, the service was developed to provide news and information about politics, along with the less "glamorous" aspects of government reporting, including legislative and regulatory coverage.

The first stages of what is now Bloomberg Government began in 2009, when a team led by Chris Walters and Don Baptiste spent most of the year researching to find a solution to match market needs, and after two years of market sizing, the product was launched. Bloomberg Government is now used by Congressional offices, trade associations, federal contractors, lobbyists, and corporate government-affairs professionals.

On April 6, 2017, Bloomberg L.P. announced that Bloomberg Government will become part of Bloomberg BNA.

== Staff ==
Bloomberg implemented an aggressive recruiting strategy to staff Bloomberg Government in Washington, DC, which included hiring industry analysts, political staff, product developers, and a business development team. The business is currently organized in two primary segments focused on serving government-affairs professionals and federal contractors, respectively.

Arielle Elliott serves as the head of Bloomberg Government.

== Product ==
Bloomberg Government is a digital tool focused on three types of users: government-affairs professionals, congressional staff, and federal contractors.

Government affairs and Congressional staff

Bloomberg Government provides clients in Congress, corporate government affairs, trade associations, and lobbying detailed analytics that enhance decision-making. The company’s government-affairs service includes lobbying performance analytics, access to more than 35,000 aggregated news sources, in-depth legislative tracking, regulation monitoring, directories of federal agencies, professionals and congressional staff, tools to track federal spending, and access to exclusive events.

Federal Contractors

Bloomberg Government’s federal procurement service is designed for contracting professionals focused on strategy and competitive intelligence, as well as business development and sales executives. The company’s service allows teams to hone business strategy, build pipelines, perform strategic research, size markets, and identify partners throughout the industry.

Mobile App

In 2015, Bloomberg Government released an application for iPhone users featuring the product's news alerts, calendars, and congressional directories for government affairs professionals. The app is free to use for Bloomberg Government subscribers.

== Awards ==
In its inaugural year, Bloomberg Government received a Knight-Batten Award for Innovation in Journalism for combining interactive data, analytics, and reporting that quantifies the business impacts of government action.

== Events ==
Bloomberg Government convenes proprietary and underwritten events. Recent event topics range from cybersecurity and defense spending to immigration and trade policy.

Recent speakers at Bloomberg Government events include: US Vice President at the time and former president Joe Biden, Senators John McCain, Ted Cruz, Saxby Chambliss, and Bob Corker; Representatives Mario Díaz-Balart, Bill Shuster, Randy Forbes, and Adam Smith; Secretary of Transportation Anthony Foxx, White House Cybersecurity Coordinator Michael Daniel, Air Force Secretary Deborah Lee James, former Director of the National Security Agency Keith Alexander, former FBI Director Robert Mueller, former Secretary of Transportation Ray LaHood, former Environmental Protection Agency Administrator Carol Browner, and former Governors Haley Barbour and Ed Rendell.
