= Bloomberg Law =

Online legal research service

- Website type: Subscription-based service for online legal research
- Available in: English
- Owners: Michael Bloomberg (88%) and Bank of America (12%; through Merrill Lynch)
- Parent: Bloomberg L.P.
- Website: pro.bloomberglaw.com
- Commercial: Yes
- Registration: Required
- Launched: 2010; 16 years ago
- Current status: Online

Bloomberg Law is a subscription-based service that uses data analytics and artificial intelligence for online legal research. The service, which Bloomberg L.P. introduced in 2009, provides legal content, proprietary company information and news information to attorneys, law students, and other legal professionals. More specifically, this commercial legal and business technology platform integrates Bloomberg Law News with Bloomberg Industry Group's primary and secondary legal content and business development tools.

== Creation and services ==
Bloomberg Law's web-based platform was first released under a pilot program in late 2009. According to the Financial Times, "the unit forms part of the data provider's drive to diversify beyond the banks and investment groups that make up the core customers for its eponymous terminals." In 2010, the service was formally launched. According to Bloomberg BNA, the platform was developed to help law firms grow their top line revenue, provide counsel by getting answers quickly and efficiently, and maintain and increase their profitability.

Prior to the creation of Bloomberg Law, two services, LexisNexis and Westlaw, comprised the majority of the legal research market. Bloomberg L.P. sought to separate itself from the competition by offering an integration of the Bloomberg company and financial data with legal research. Bloomberg Law combines content from Bloomberg's global news network, legal analysis, court dockets, legal filings and reports from Bloomberg legal analysts as well as business news and information. Attorneys can also draw upon stock charts, search patent histories and find information about relevant judges and attorneys. The service is priced to include all features under a fixed monthly fee.

In 2011, Bloomberg L.P. purchased Bureau of National Affairs (BNA), and integrated legal materials from BNA into Bloomberg Law. Features include Litigation and Dockets, Legal and Financial Analytics, Business Development Center, Practice Tools and News and Law Reports. In September 2019, Bloomberg BNA changed its name to Bloomberg Industry Group, which includes Bloomberg Law, Bloomberg Tax, Bloomberg Government, and Bloomberg Environment.

== Growth and expansion ==
In October 2010, Lou Andreozzi, a former chief executive officer of LexisNexis North American Legal Markets, joined Bloomberg Law as chairman and Larry Thompson, a former global marketing officer of LexisNexis, joined as chief operating officer. In September 2011, Bloomberg acquired legal publisher Bureau of National Affairs (BNA) to bolster its proprietary data and content.

In September 2012, Greg McCaffery was named chief executive officer of Bloomberg Law, having been CEO and president of Bloomberg BNA. In January 2014, Bloomberg BNA, a Bloomberg L.P. subsidiary, took over day-to-day operations of Bloomberg Law. In 2018, Josh Eastright became CEO of Bloomberg BNA.

Between 2014 and 2015, Bloomberg Law expanded and debuted features including dockets covering state, federal, and select international court cases, financial and legal analytics, and practice-specific products for corporate transactions, privacy and data security, and banking. In July 2018, Joe Breda was named president, succeeding Scott Mozarsky. Breda previously was the Executive Vice President of Bloomberg Industry Group's (then called Bloomberg BNA) product team.

Bloomberg Law has integrated Bloomberg Industry Group products and focuses on practice tools for attorney productivity.

=== Features ===
- Dockets: Bloomberg Law Dockets cover state, federal, and select international court cases. Users also have access to Breaking Complaints, unlimited alerts, and searches.
- Analytics: There are two major sets of analytics available on Bloomberg Law: financial and legal. Bloomberg Law News Search houses over 50,000 news wires, while the Business Development Center pulls together business news searches to provide insights into M&A rumors, bankruptcy rumors, recent attorney moves, and other criteria.
- Points of Law: Case law research tools using artificial intelligence to identify court decisions on a particular point of law.
- State Chart Builders: Allows comparison of relevant laws and regulations from different jurisdictions.
- Smart Code: Uses artificial intelligence and machine learning to create virtual annotated codes.
- Brief Analyzer: Tools that use artificial intelligence to reduce time analyzing legal briefs.
- Litigation Analytics: Organization of analysis by attorneys, law firms, courts, judges, and companies.
- Practical Guidance: Coverage for litigators and transactional attorneys in various practice areas.
