= United States Daily =

Early 20th-century American newspaper

- Type: Daily newspaper
- Owner: David Lawrence
- Founder: David Lawrence
- Publisher: United States Daily Pub. Corp
- Founded: March 6, 1926; 100 years ago
- Ceased publication: May 13, 1933
- Relaunched: → United States News → U.S. News & World Report → Bloomberg Industry Group
- Language: English
- City: Washington, D.C., U.S.
- Country: USA

United States Daily (1926–1933) was an American newspaper founded in Washington, D.C., by publisher David Lawrence.

== History ==
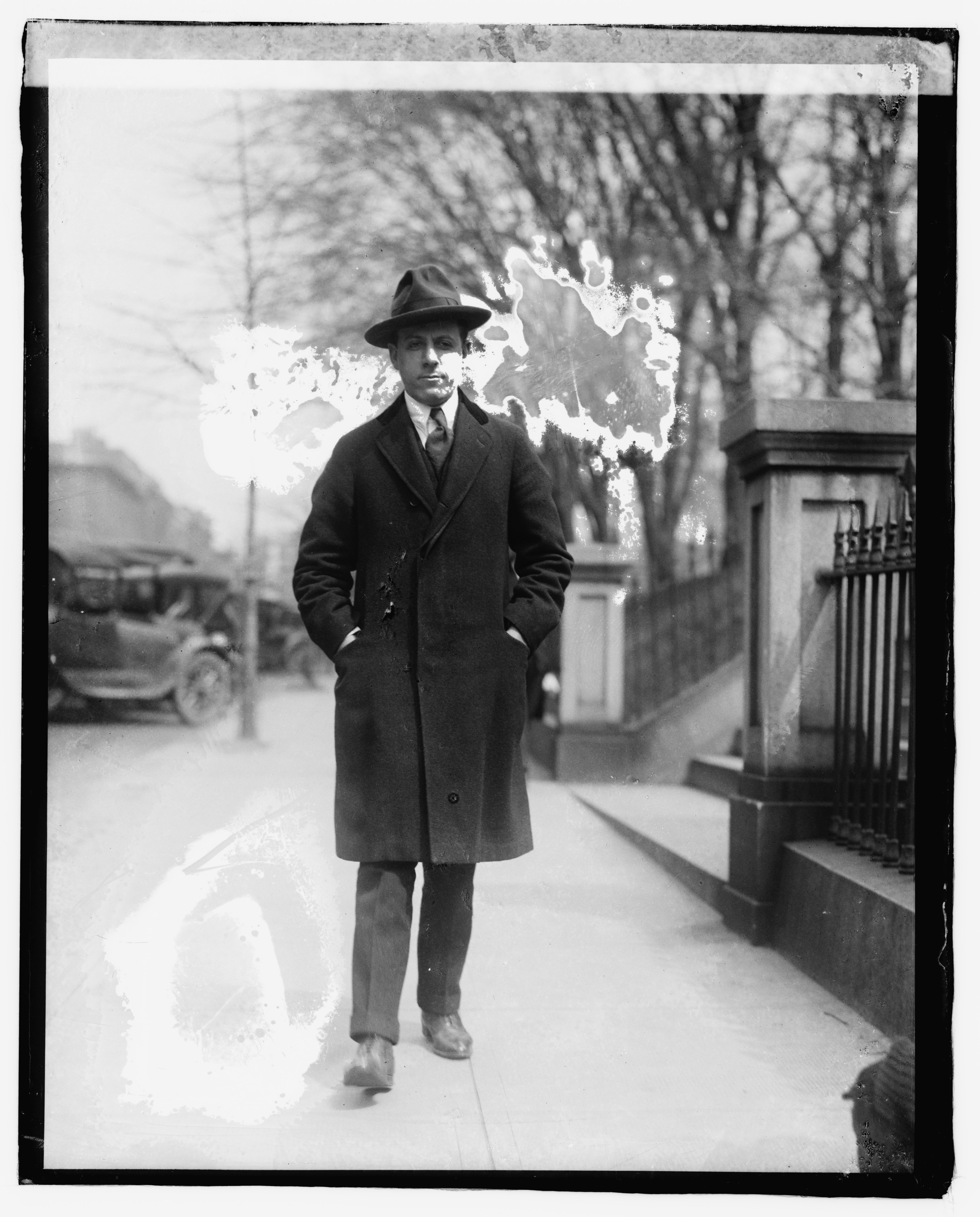
United States Daily founder David Lawrence in 1920

United States Daily started on March 4, 1926. Rival publication Time magazine reported that, "A daily tabulation of Government news, presented without comment or color, it was the dullest newspaper in the land. To a limited group of businessmen, lawyers, teachers, editors, officials it was also the most useful."

In November 1926, U.S. President Calvin Coolidge praised United States Daily, stating "Making a daily topical survey of all the bureaus of the National Government, grouping related activities, is a work which will enable our citizens to understand and use the fine facilities the Congress provides for them."

In May 1928, David Lawrence of United States Daily testified before the Federal Trade Commission about lobbying by public utilities.

In July 1931, United States Daily published a half-page ad about its content and its advertising in the New York Sun:

What Makes

A GOOD ADVERTISING MEDIUM?

Readers who display an interest and confidence in its contents.

The United States Daily is read by America's informed leadership. It is read by men and women whose responsibilities and activities make it necessary for them to have original and authentic sources of information.
The United States Daily, America's National Newspaper, is ready by people with their feet on the floor. It is read for facts which become a part of their daily program. Not everyone can use these facts, but 120,000 of America's informed leaders find them indispensable.
The confidence which the readers of The United States Daily place in its contents is shared by the messages in its advertising column.

When money isn't everyowhere, it pays to go where money is.

In August 1931, United States Daily published a full-page ad about advertising in the New York Sun.

United States Daily closed in March 1933, unable to sustain itself commercially and dependent on "endowment."

After its closure, Lawrence founded the United States News newspaper, which merged with World Report in 1948 to form the news magazine U.S. News & World Report. The newspaper claimed that it was "Presenting the only daily record of the official acts of the legislative, executive, and judicial branches of the government of the United States of America." It was Bureau of National Affairs, Inc. (BNA), founded in 1929 by Lawrence as a subsidiary of United States Daily, that over time became today's Bloomberg Industry Group.

== Circulation ==
At its peak in 1929, the newspaper had a circulation of 40,000 and expanded its news to all US states (48 at that time).

== Cost ==
The cost of subscription started at $10 per year, then $15 and eventually $50.

== Staff ==
Staff included:

- Louis Brownlow, writer (1927)
- Wilhelm Heinrich Detlev Körner, illustrator

== See also ==
- David Lawrence (publisher)
- U.S. News & World Report
- Bloomberg Industry Group
