= Middle Gate (Piraeus) =

Archaeological site in Piraeus, Athens

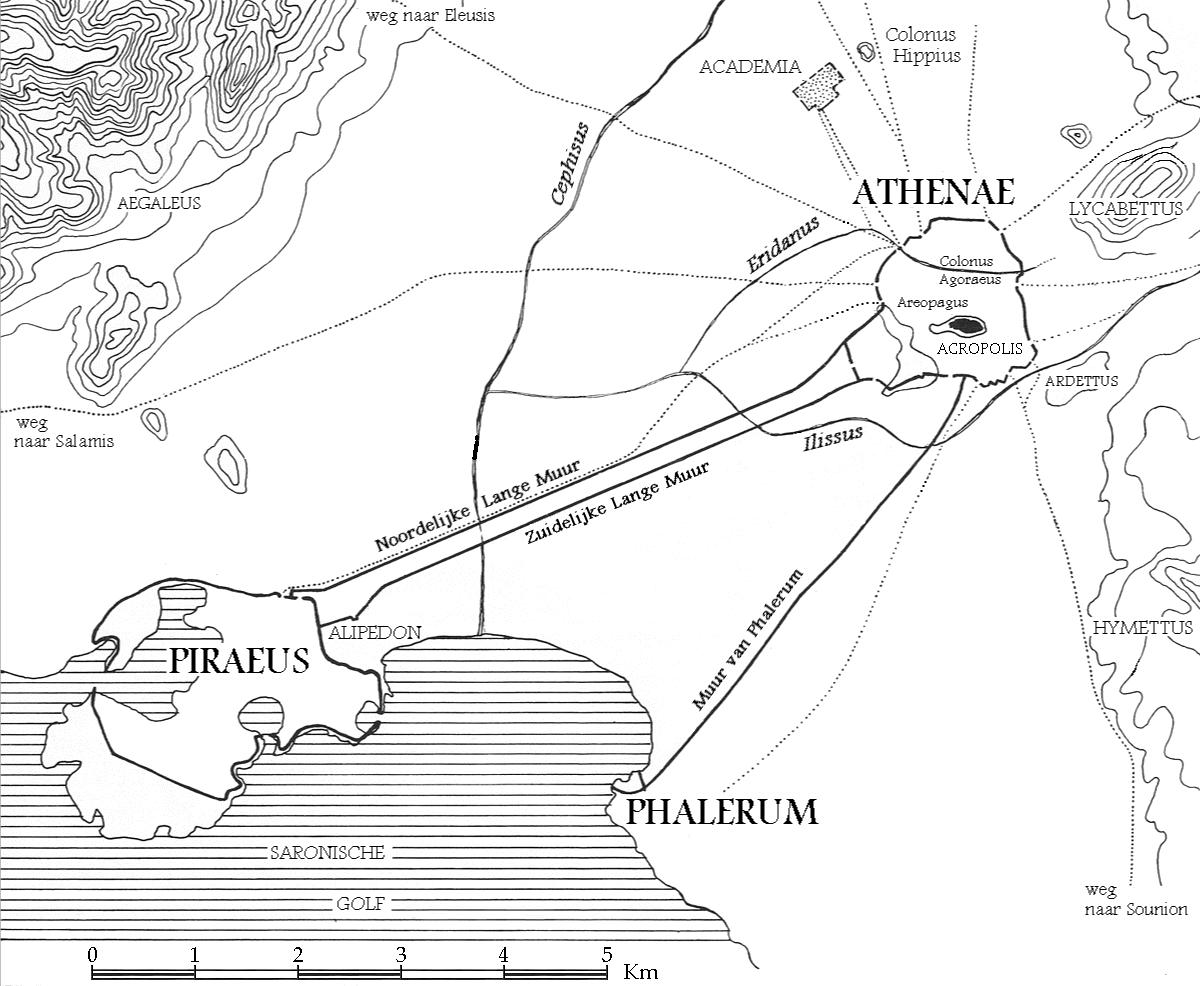
- The Long Walls of Athens
- Interactive map of Middle Gate
- Type: City Gate
- Periods: Classical Period
- Cultures: Greek
- Satellite of: Athens
- Location: Piraeus, Athens
- Region: Attica

History
- Built: 493 BC
- Built by: Themistokles

Site notes
- Material: stone
- Condition: Ruined
- Owner: Private
- Management: Ephorate of Antiquities of West Attika, Piraeus and Islands
- Public access: Visible from road

The Middle Gate was one of the city gates in the ancient walls of Piraeus, in Athens, Greece

== History ==
Themistokles built the walls and city gates of Piraeus in 493 BC and according to Thucydides this marked the foundation of the city of Piraeus. However, most of the construction took place following the Greco-Persian Wars.

The city gates were monumental gates that formed the ancient entrance to Piraeus. They were built in the form of a dipylon and had a rectangular courtyard with two opposing entrances. Each Gate was reinforced with towers. The city walls were made out of ashlar, comprising large cut rectangular stones and the Gates were linked by two parallel roads that connected the main settlement of Athens with its harbour of Piraeus. One road lay between the Long Walls and the other lay outside them. The outside road ended at the City (Asty) Gate, which was built between 479 and 477 BC and is the older of the two City Gates.

== Middle Gate ==
The Middle Gate was built after the City (Asty) Gate and after the construction of the Long Walls (southern and middle section). It was built in order to keep communication with Athens if the city was under siege. The Gate was built by Perikles in the fifth century BC.

At this archaeological site the entire floor plan of the Middle Gate can be seen, together with traces of the door mechanism.

== Gallery ==
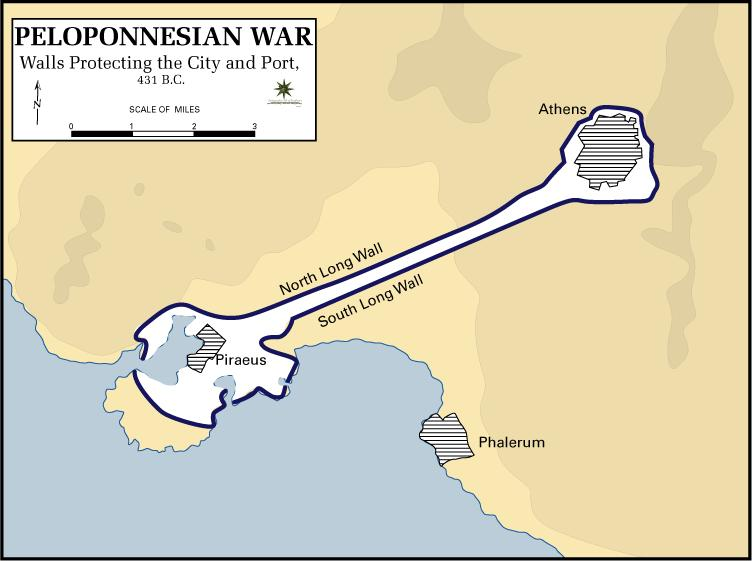
Plan of the Long Walls of Athens

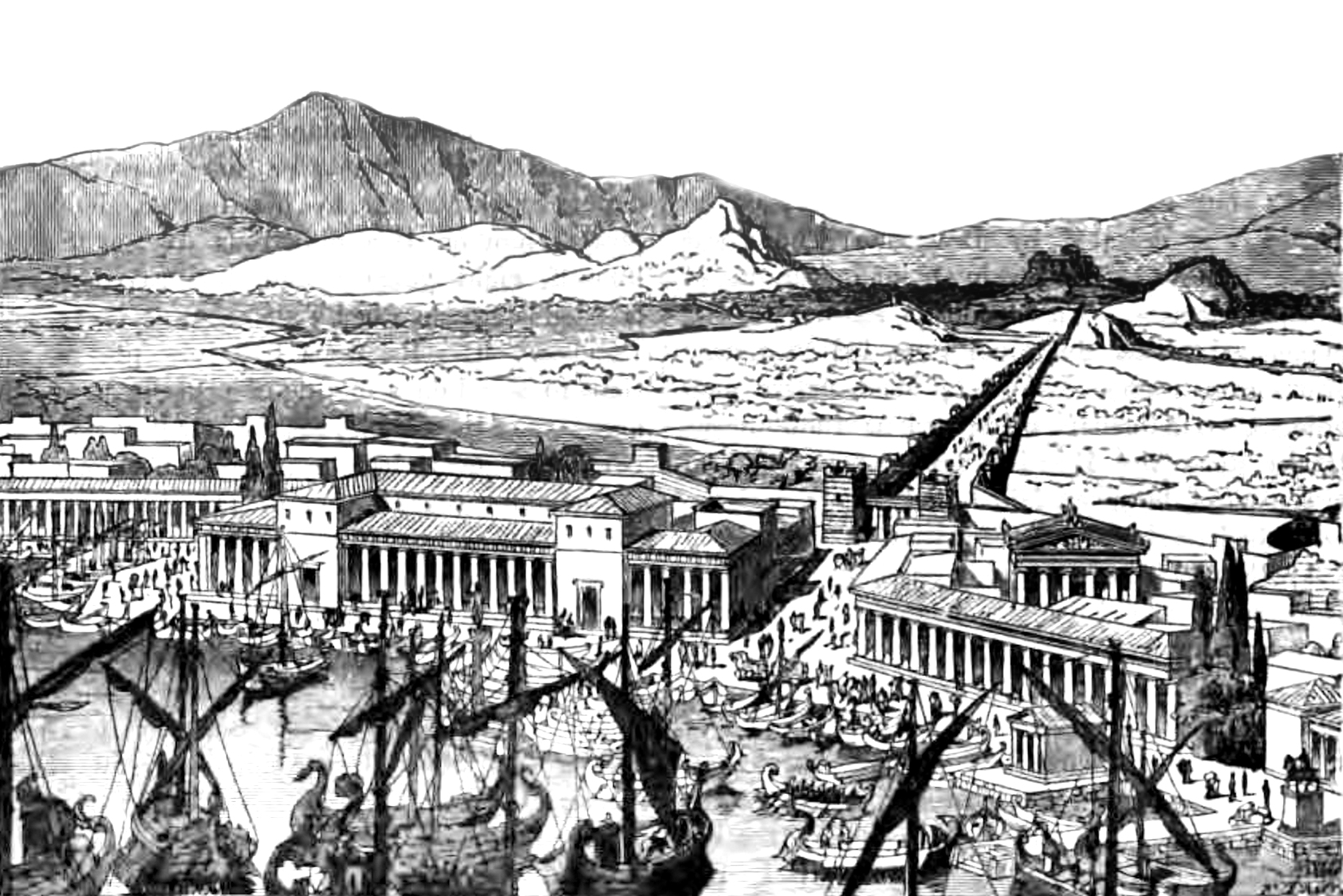
The Piraeus and the Long Walls of Athens.

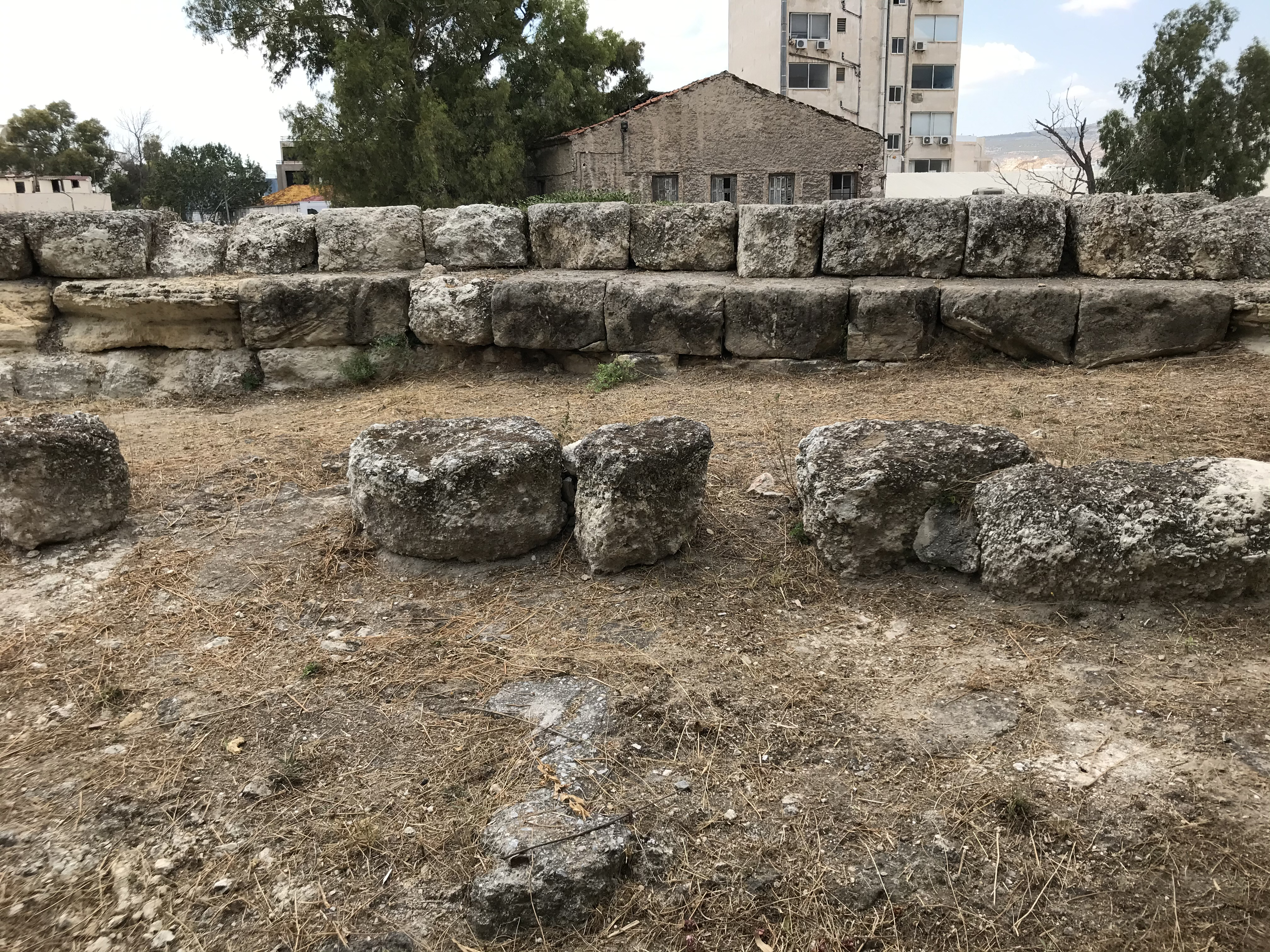
Middle Gate (Piraeus).

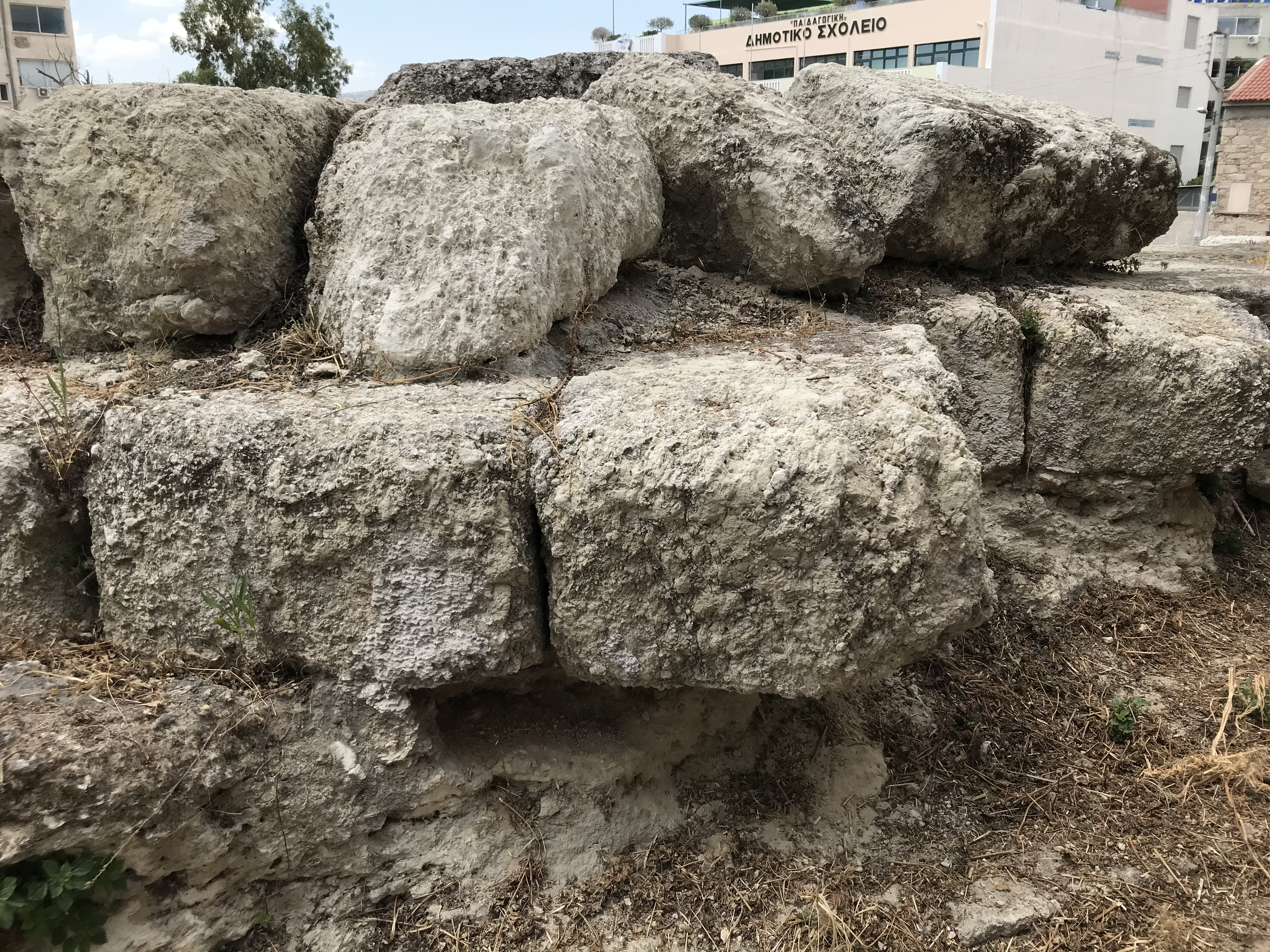
Middle Gate (Piraeus).

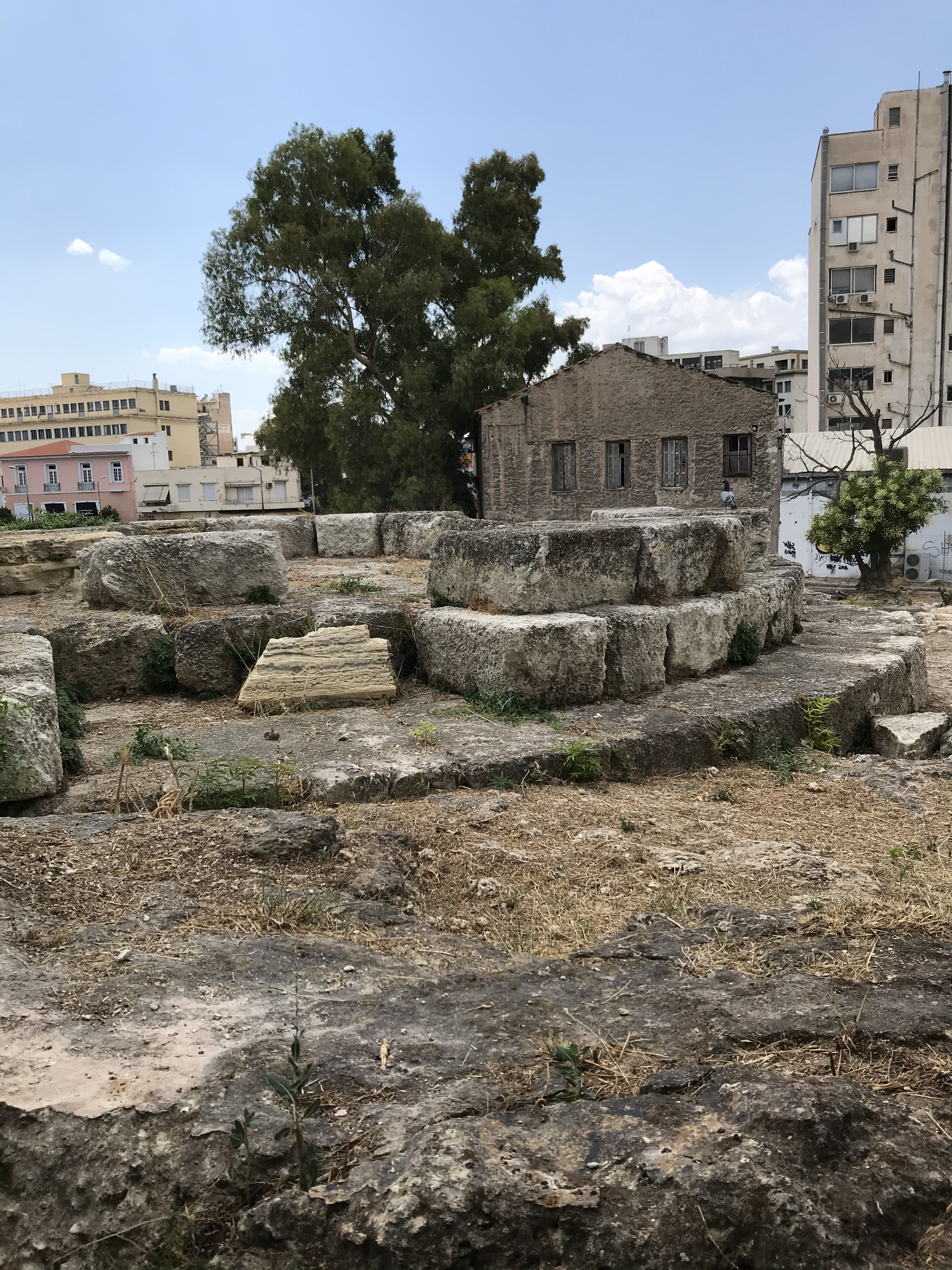
Middle Gate (Piraeus).

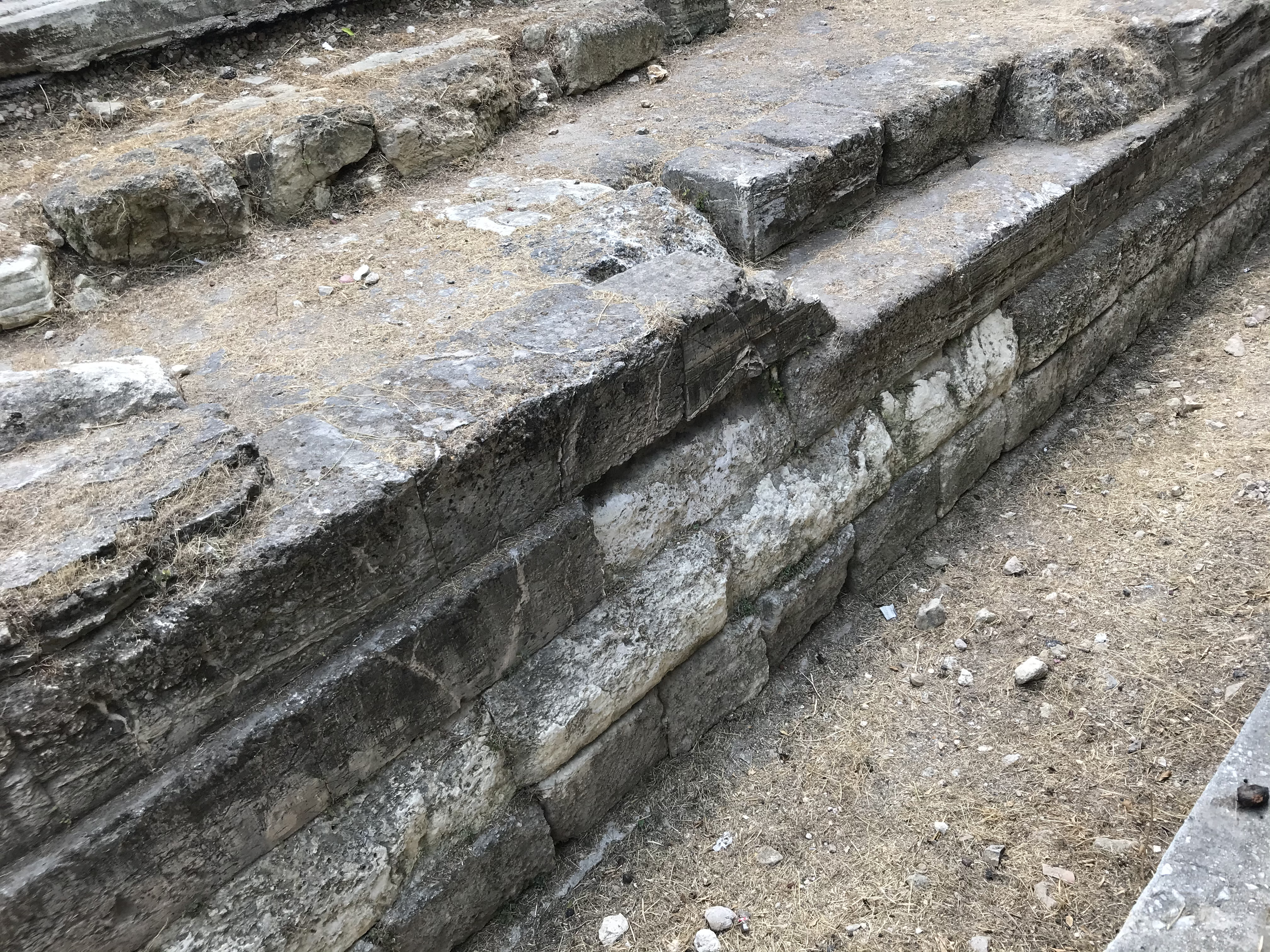
Middle Gate (Piraeus).

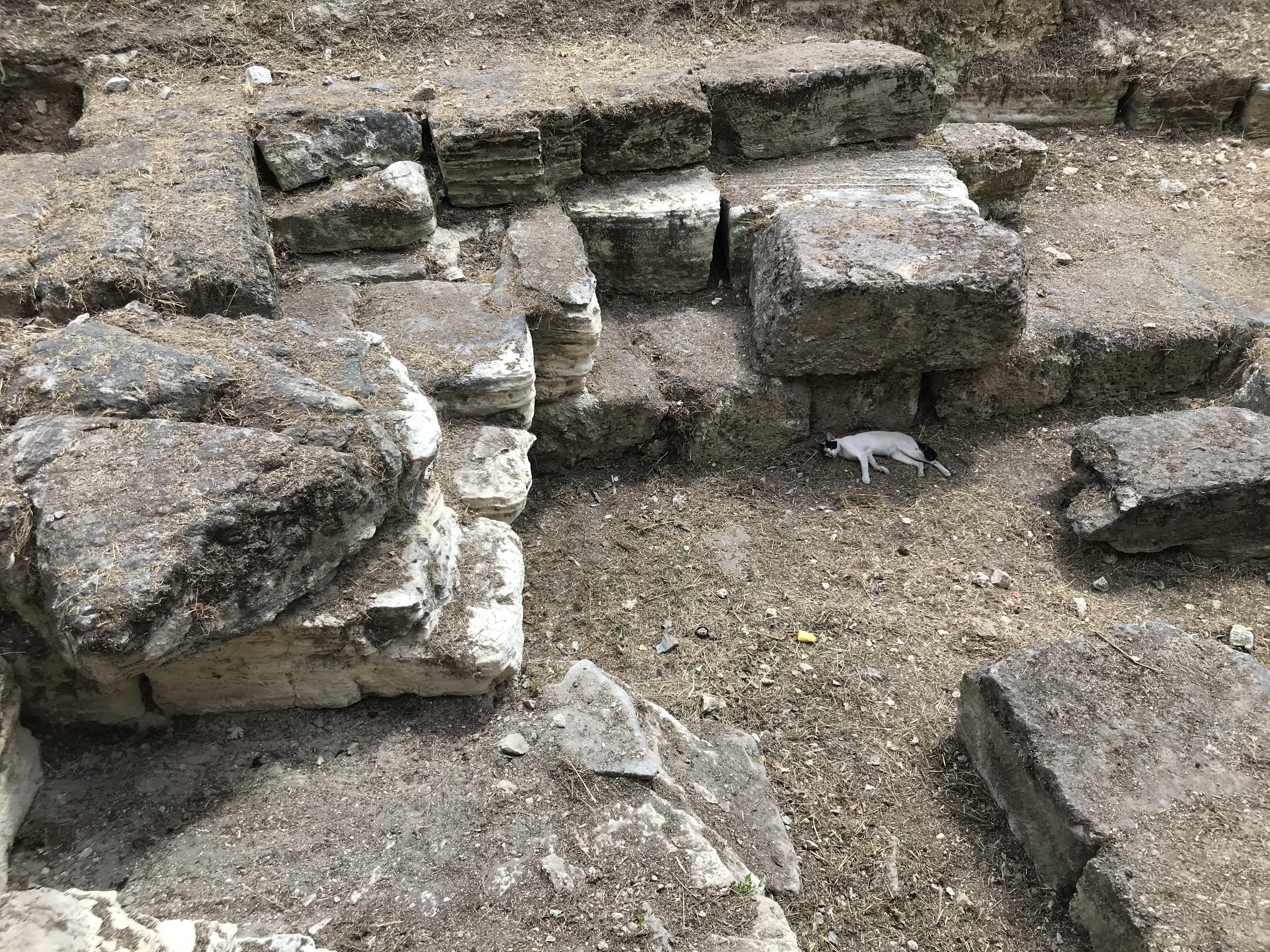
Middle Gate (Piraeus).

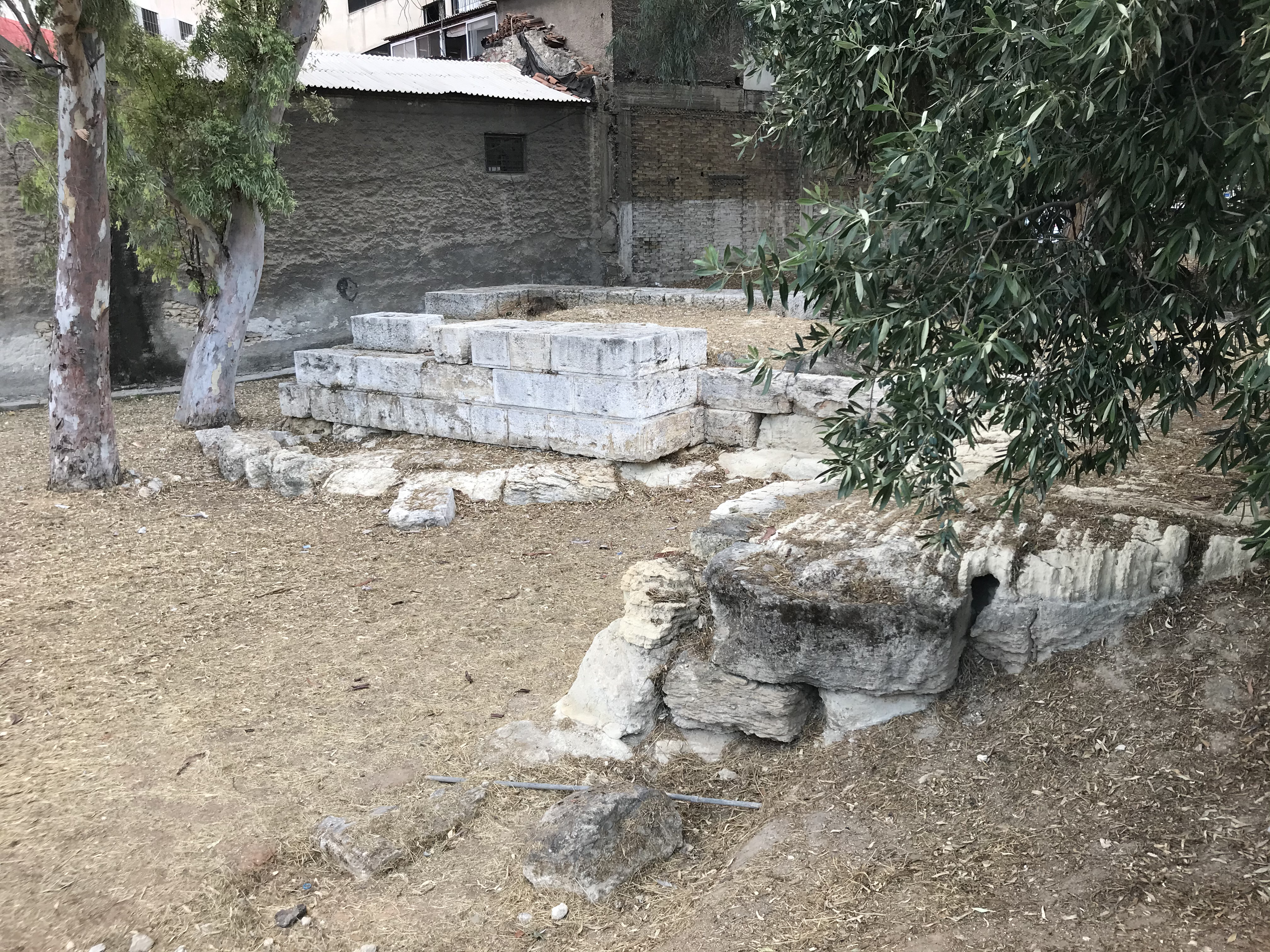
Middle Gate (Piraeus).

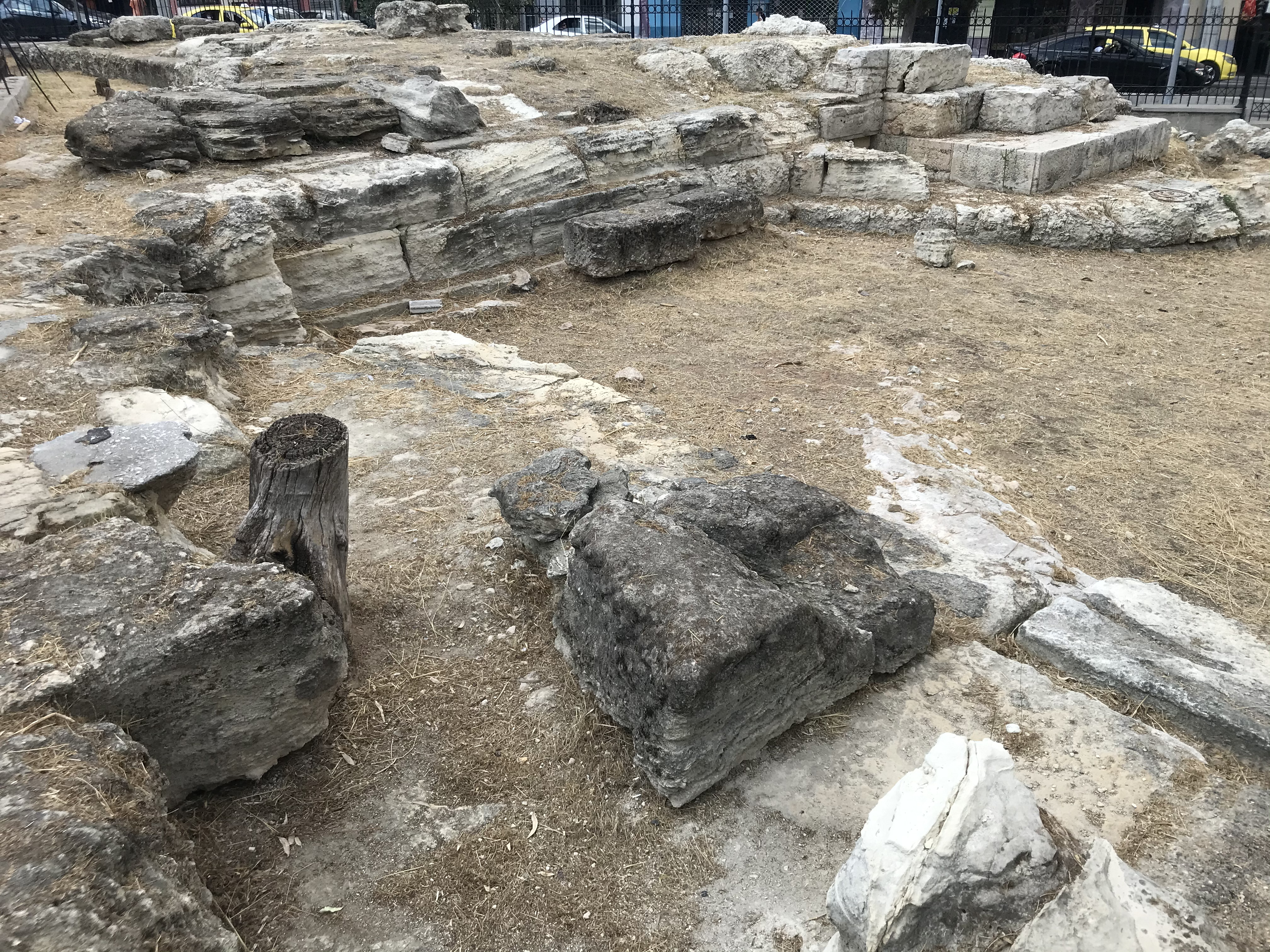
Middle Gate (Piraeus).
