= Ellanor C. Lawrence Park =

Park in Chantilly, Virginia, United States

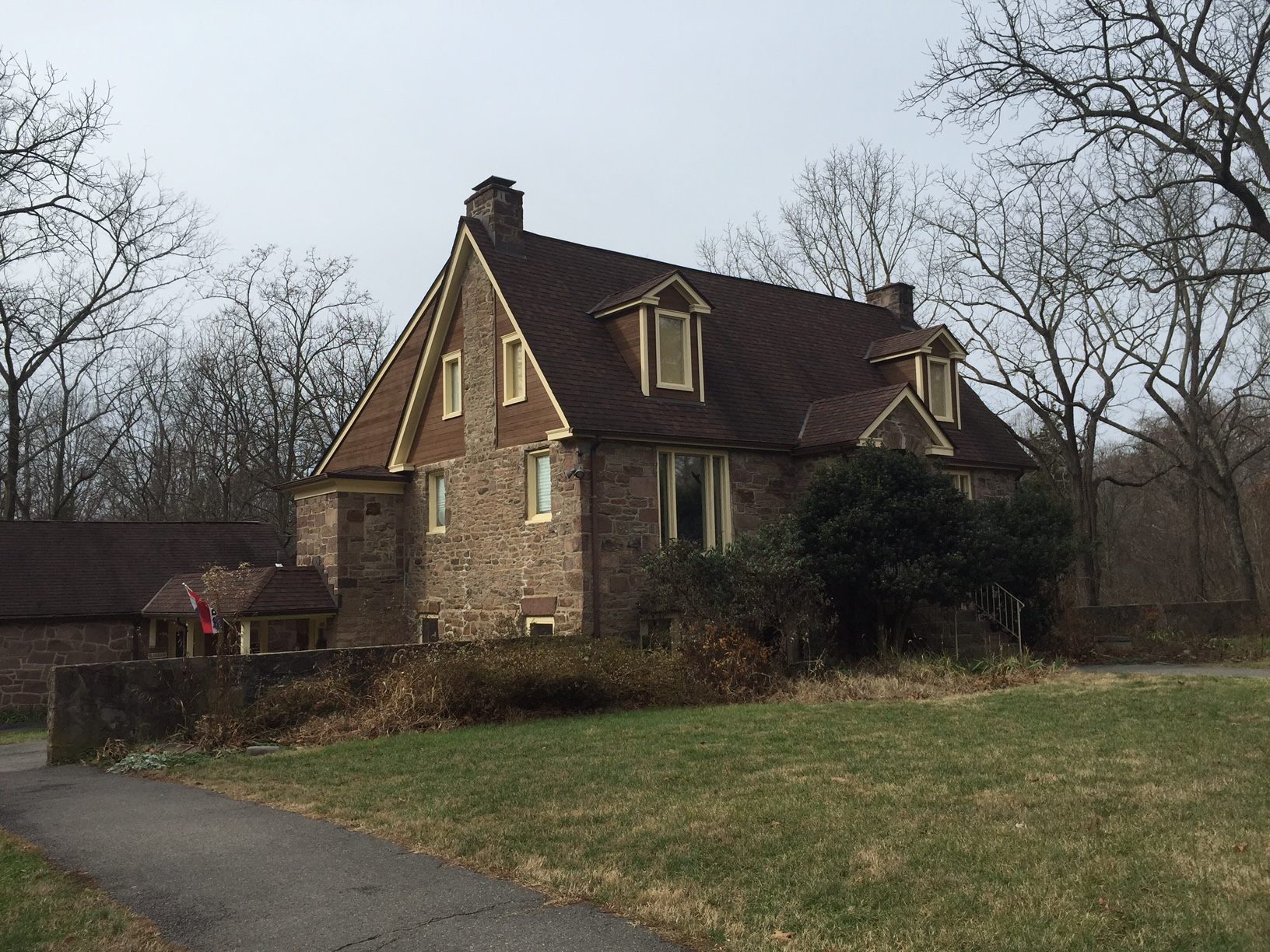
- Walney Visitor Center

- Location within Virginia
- Location: North of the junction of VA 28 and I-66, near Chantilly, Virginia
- Coordinates: 38°51′41″N 77°25′50″W
- Area: 640 acres (260 ha)
- Operator: Fairfax County Park Authority
- Website: Ellanor C. Lawrence Park

Ellanor C. Lawrence Park is located in Chantilly, Virginia, just north of Centreville, on Route 28. The park preserves the cultural and natural resources of western Fairfax County and has a long and complex history lasting 8,000 years. The land was originally inhabited by Native Americans, but as Europeans settled in Virginia, the land was shaped by only three families: the Browns, Machens and Lawrences. Through these periods, the land was used as a tenant farm, family homestead, and country estate until it was deeded to Fairfax County Park Authority as a 640-acre nature park in 1971.

On the eastern side of Route 28, visitors can learn about the site’s natural and cultural history at Walney Visitor Center, where visitors can see the park’s several significant structures including Walney, an 18th-century farmhouse, and 19th century outbuildings and features, including a smokehouse, dairy, ice house and ice pond remnants. Cabell's Mill and Middlegate stand in the southeastern end of the park. Middlegate is an early 19th-century stone house associated with Cabell’s Mill, which was built in the 18th century. Cabell's Mill is a popular setting for weddings and is available for rent through the Fairfax County Park Authority. Middlegate is used for park administrative offices.

Approximately four miles of mostly earthen trails are accessible from the Visitor Center, the pond, Cabell's Mill and the park's northern terminus on Poplar Tree Road. The trails pass through the park's diverse habitats and are popular with birders, runners, dog walkers, and families. Trail maps are available at the Walney Visitor Center. Bicycles are not permitted on most park trails except the paved or gravel Big Rocky Run Stream Trail, which begins near Cabell's Mill and ends at the Fairfax County Parkway.

Fishing under state regulations and licensing is permitted in the pond and Big Rocky Run.

On the western site of Route 28, the park houses playgrounds, athletic fields (including soccer, baseball, and softball fields), and a fitness trail with stations.

== History ==
=== Brown family ===
In 1739, Willoughby Newton purchased a series of properties surrounding the Centreville area totaling to 2,500 acres. Newton never settled in western Fairfax County, but instead leased the property to tenant farmers. Thomas Brown received a “three-lives lease” from Willoughby Newton in 1742 for 150 acres. This meant his lease would be valid through his life, as well as that of his wife, Elizabeth, and first son, Joseph. Through the lease, Brown was required to have a 200-tree apple orchard and pay an annual rent of 530 pounds of dried and cured tobacco.

Thomas Brown farmed tobacco as well as crops and vegetables to help support his family. As Brown worked the land, he began build up his wealth and purchased acres outside of his lease. By 1776, Thomas Brown and his youngest son Coleman had acquired some 630 acres, sold the “three-lives lease” and may have built the stone house that would become Walney Visitor Center. As tobacco depleted the soil, Thomas and Coleman switched from tobacco monoculture to mixed crops including wheat, corn, and rye.

At Thomas Brown’s death in 1793, the property was given to his son Coleman who operated the farm until his death. Coleman left the bulk of the farm to the children of his daughter, Mary Lewis, with the expectation that it would be sold and the proceeds divided among them. But he stipulated that his wife Elizabeth be allowed to reside there for the remainder of her life. For the next ten years, until her death in 1840, Elizabeth had legal oversight of the farm. There are few records pertaining to this period. It is possible she turned over management to her son-in-law, Coleman Lewis. Advertisements for the sale of the farm noted the presence of tenant houses, so it may be that she left management to them. Whoever was responsible, the farm was in poor condition in 1843 when, following Elizabeth's death, it was sold to Lewis H. Machen, one of Thomas Brown's great-grandchildren.

=== Machen family ===
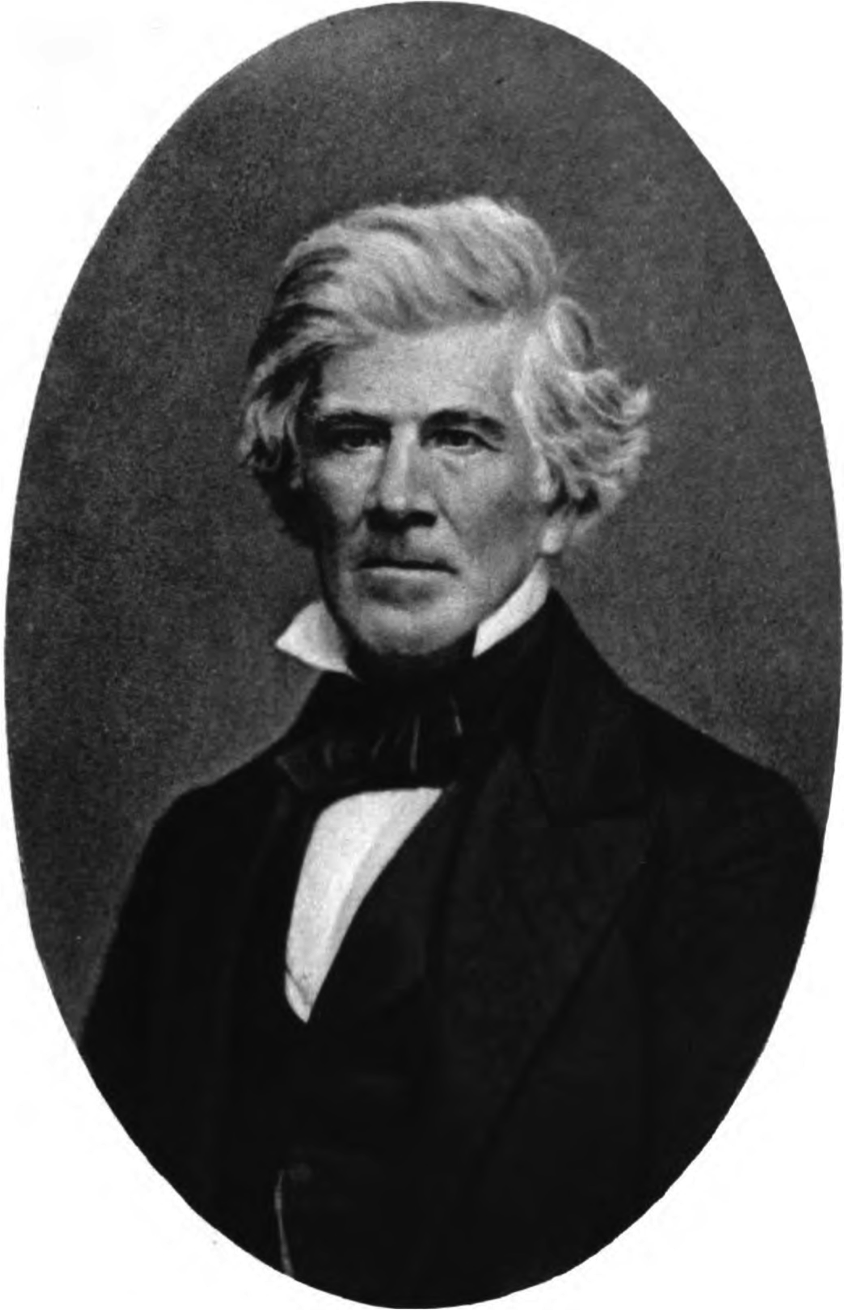
Lewis H. Machen

In 1843 Lewis H. Machen purchased 725 acres from Coleman Brown's grandchildren for $10,879 and moved to the property with his wife Caroline, daughter Emmeline, and sons Arthur and James. The Machens moved into a framed house that was located near the stone house that still remains on the property. Lewis Machen had a large and valuable collection of books and he converted the small stone house into a library and study. Lewis Machen was not a farmer, but instead served as a clerk for the United States Senate. Lewis was aware that maintaining his position required a political adroitness that did not come easily to him. He hoped the farm would be a source of economic security for him and his family when he chose to retire, or if he lost his position. The Machens also expected that the sale of their home in Washington would help to pay for the farm. Unfortunately, no one was interested in buying the DC property. As a result, Machen was forced to rely on his Senate income to maintain the farm and he remained in DC much of the time, leaving the farm in the care of his wife and two sons.

The farm was in poor condition when it was purchased, but Lewis had an avid interest in revitalizing the farm and making it profitable. A participant of the scientific farming movement of the 1840s and 1850s, Lewis experimented with crop rotation and the use of fertilizer including Peruvian guano. Because Lewis was not always on the farm, he wrote extensive letters giving directions to Arthur and James and kept records of the farm in workbooks. These workbooks contain detailed information about the operation of the farm including what tasks were completed each day, who completed them, and what the weather was.

The eldest son, Arthur, lived at Walney in his teen years, operating the farm alongside his brother James. It was Arthur who named the farm Walney, a name that referred to the walnut trees that grew in front of the house. Arthur did not, however, have much interest in farming. He was a scholar and entered Harvard Law School in 1849 and settled in Baltimore, Maryland, as a lawyer.

On the farm, the Machens grew a variety of crops for market or to supply the needs of farm animals, including oats and wheat, corn, radishes and potatoes. They also raised cattle, sheep, and milk cows for market as well as personal use. The Machens also had a kitchen vegetable garden, chickens and hogs which they harvested for their own use. In the winter of 1853, the Machens constructed an ice pond and ice house to harvest and store their own ice. To help them manage the farm, the Machens hired white farmhands and rented enslaved African Americans from slave-owners.

In 1859, Lewis finally retired from service as a clerk for the United States Senate. However, Lewis was not able to have a peaceful retirement with the coming of the American Civil War.

=== American Civil War ===
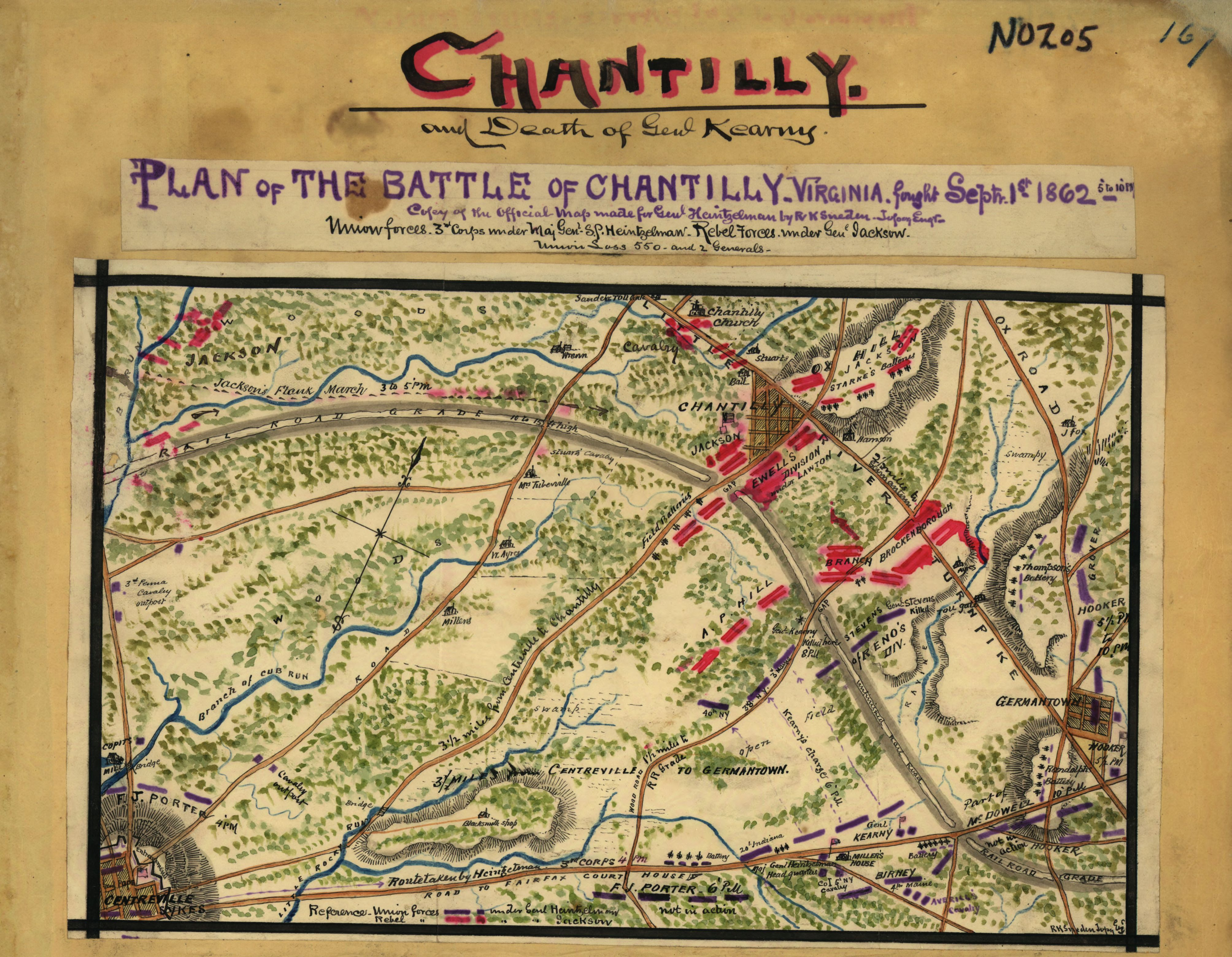
Map of the Battle of Chantilly (also known as the Battle of Ox Hill) on September 1, 1862, depicting events from 5 to 10 PM.

Walney witnessed extensive troop movement during the American Civil War due to its proximity to Washington, D.C. and especially the Manassas rail junction, which linked to the Shenandoah Valley. In the winter of 1861-1862, over 40,000 troops camped in the Centreville area, cutting down local trees for firewood, fortifications and shelter, damaging woods, fields, and gardens. During this winter, Walney was used to house a few of the sick soldiers in the area to be cared for by the Machen women.

In August 1862, directly following the Battle of Second Manassas, Walney was right in the path retreating Union soldiers, who stole oxen, horses, food and supplies. They also plundered the stone house and tried to break into the frame house in which Lewis Machen was lying ill. Union soldiers were stopped from entering by Caroline Machen, who stood, barricading the door, until a passing Union officer ordered the men away and stopped the assault. The next day, on September 1, 1862, the Battle of Ox Hill occurred on a portion of the property in the Machen’s cornfield.

Despite the troop movements and action seen during the war, Walney survived with less property loss than many of the neighboring farms. However, the war had taken a toll on the Machens. Lewis Machen died in 1863, shortly after leaving Walney to take refuge in Baltimore with Arthur. Caroline and daughter Emmeline would remain in Baltimore for the rest of their lives, returning to Walney only for family visits. James returned from service with the Confederate Army to try to rebuild his family's farm despite the losses of war.

=== Postbellum ===
James Machen took over Walney after the war. He struggled to replace animals and equipment that had been lost during the war. In December 1874, a faulty chimney caused the frame house in which James and his family lived to burn, forcing James to move his family into the stone house after renovations in 1875. But James persevered and transformed the farm from growing crops to a dairy farm. By 1880, James was producing 3000 pounds of butter a year. In 1881 he expanded his dairy and began to produce cheese as well as butter. As James grew older he began to abandon farming. While historians do not know for certain why James did this, contributing factors could be the death of his wife Georgie in 1895, or the fact that none of his children were interested in taking over the farm. After James' death in 1913, his children rented the farm until the 1920s. Throughout this period, the farm deteriorated significantly and was abandoned until the 1930s.

=== Lawrence family ===
In 1935, Ellanor C. Lawrence purchased the property from Machen descendants for $16,500. Ellanor and her husband David Lawrence had lived in Washington, D.C., since 1916. Her husband was a columnist and founder of U.S. News & World Report. Though the property would become part of their country estate and retreat from Washington, D.C., the Lawrences rented the Walney stone house to various tenants and never lived there. In 1942, Ellanor purchased the adjoining Cabell’s Mill property, increasing her landholdings by 20 acres. The Lawrences lived at Middlegate, which had been the miller's house, when staying at their Walney estate. Both Cabell's Mill and Middlegate remain as features of Ellanor C. Lawrence Park.

Ellanor made several changes to the old Walney farm. She tore down several of the original farm and tenant structures and renovated the Walney house and Middlegate. She was also an avid gardener and added landscape features and flowers, many of which were imported from Japan. Old farm field and pastures were left to return to wild fields and forests.

When Ellanor C. Lawrence died in 1969, she willed the property to her husband with the intent that it be given to a public agency so that its natural and cultural resources could be preserved. In 1971, David Lawrence deeded 640 acres including Walney and Cabell’s Mill to the Fairfax County Park Authority in memory of Ellanor. In 1982, the little stone house that was built by the Browns, had housed the Machen library, and was James' home, became the Walney Visitor Center, interpreting the site’s natural and cultural history and greeting visitors who visit the park.

=== Chain of title ===
NORTH OF ROCKY RUN

1728 Richard Brett/Britt granted land north of Rocky Run

circa 1739 Scarlett and Lettice Hancock inherit from Brett/Britt

1741 John Hancock inherits from Scarlett Hancock

1761 Thomas Brown purchases from John Hancock

1769 Coleman Brown purchases from Lettice Hancock Langfitt

1793 Coleman Brown inherits from Thomas Brown

1830 children of Mary Lewis inherit from Coleman Brown, except 2 acres & house granted to Mary Lewis

1843 Lewis Machen purchases from children of Mary Lewis, includes Mary Lewis 2 acres & house

1863 James, Arthur, and Emmeline inherit from Lewis Machen

1935 Ellanor C. Lawrence purchases from Machen heirs

1971 Fairfax County Park Authority receives donation from estate of Ellanor C. Lawrence

SOUTH OF ROCKY RUN: THOMAS BROWN LEASE

1727 Francis Awbrey granted land south of Rocky Run

unknown John Tayloe purchases from Francis Awbrey

1740 Willoughby Newton purchases from John Tayloe

1742 Thomas Brown leases 150 acres from Willoughby Newton

1767 Katherine and John Lane inherit 350 acres from Willoughby Newton

1769 James Hardage Lane purchases from Katherine and John Lane

1776 Thomas Brown assigns lease to William Fintch

1776 William Fintch assigns lease to James Hardage Lane

1810 Coleman Brown purchases approx. 135 acres from estate of James Hardage Lane, consolidating with property north of Rocky Run

SOUTH OF ROCKY RUN: MILL PROPERTY

1727 Francis Awbrey granted land south of Rocky Run

unknown John Tayloe purchases from Francis Awbrey

1740 Willoughby Newton purchases from John Tayloe

1767 Katherine and John Lane inherit 350 acres from Willoughby Newton

1769 William Carr Lane leases mill property from Katherine and John Lane

1770 Wilson Carr Lane inherits from William Carr Lane

1772 Wilson Carr Lane purchases 20 acres, including 4 inherited from Willam from Katherince & John Lane

1791 Samuel Love purchases from Wilson Carr Lane

1800 Charles Love inherits from Samuel Love

1808 Daniel Harrington purchases from Charles Love

1811 Carr Wilson Lane purchases from Daniel Harrington

1816 George Brittan purchases from Wilson Carr Lane

1818 James Lane Triplett purchases from estate of George Brittan

1846 Edward Caple purchases from estate of James Lane Triplett

1866 James Caple inherits from Edward Caple

1875 E. M. Pittman purchases from James Caple

1906 Carrie Settle inherits from E. M. Pittman

1908 Singelton & Mary Copper purchase from Carrie Settle Kemper

1909 W. I. and May Marsteller purchase from Coopers

1911 Louie and James May purchase from Marstellers

1914 Harvey and Olive Nichols purchase from May & May

1916 Louie May purchases from Nichols

1918 Amos and Martha Kendall purchase from May

1926 W. T. Harris purchases from Kendalls

1929 John Rixey-Smith purchases from Harris

1932 Dorothy and Arthur Radford purchase from Rixey-Smith

1944 Herbert and Claire Weiller purchase from Dorothy Radford

1944 Ellanor C. Lawrence purchase from Weillers, consolidating with property north of Rocky Run

== Natural resources ==
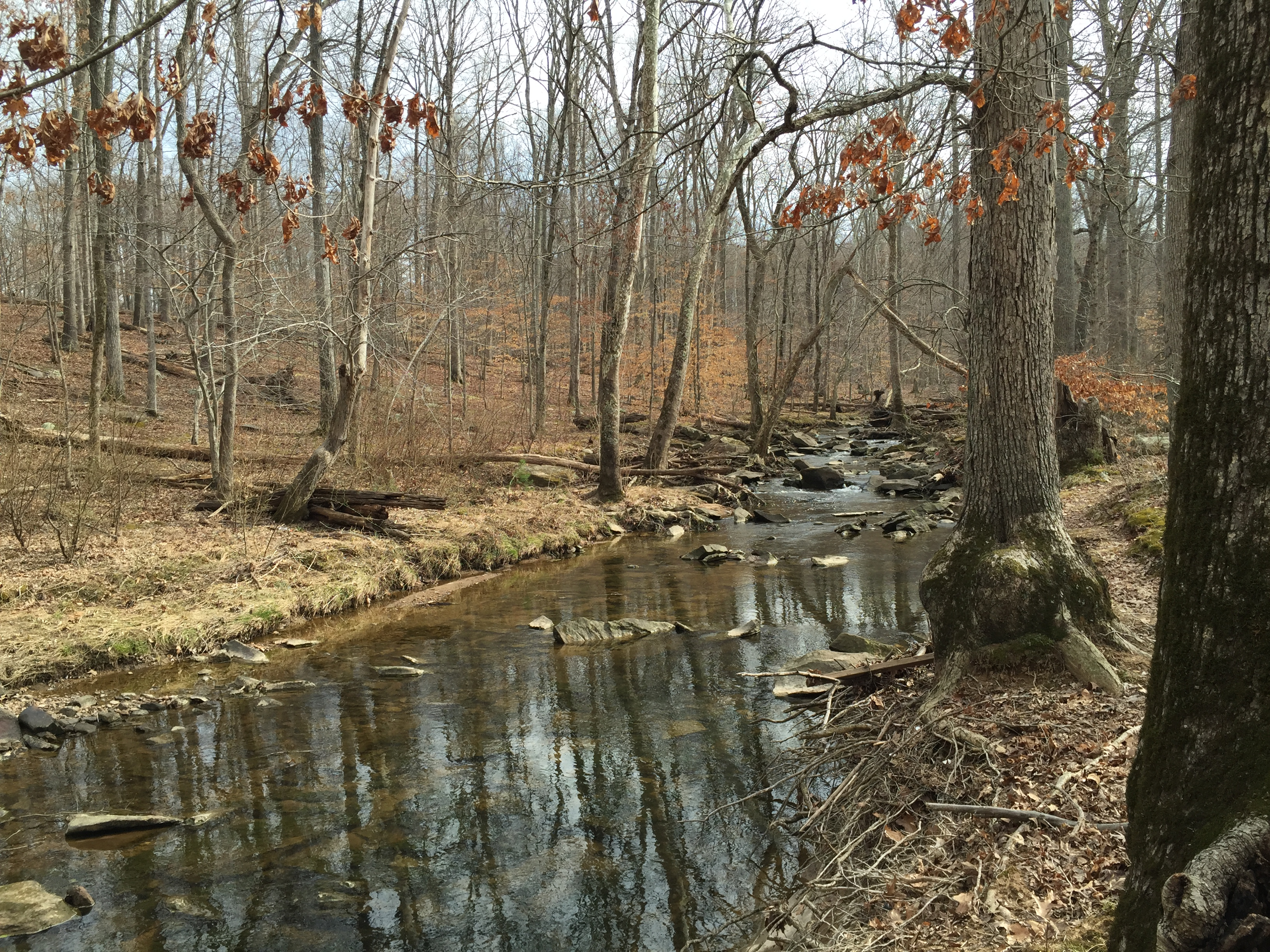
Big Rocky Run in Ellanor C. Lawrence Park

Nestled in Virginia’s Piedmont region, Ellanor C. Lawrence Park contains oak-hickory and cedar forests, streams, meadows and a pond that help support the local ecosystem. Streams inside the park, including Big Rocky Run, Walney Creek, and Round Lick Run, drain into the Chesapeake Bay Watershed. Native animals can be found inside the park including a robust number of reptiles and amphibians, 133 document species of birds, and more than 30 species of mammals including white-tailed deer and coyotes. More than 300 plant species have been identified. A complete list of the plants and animals found inside the park can be found on the park’s website.
