= David Lawrence (publisher) =

American newspaperman

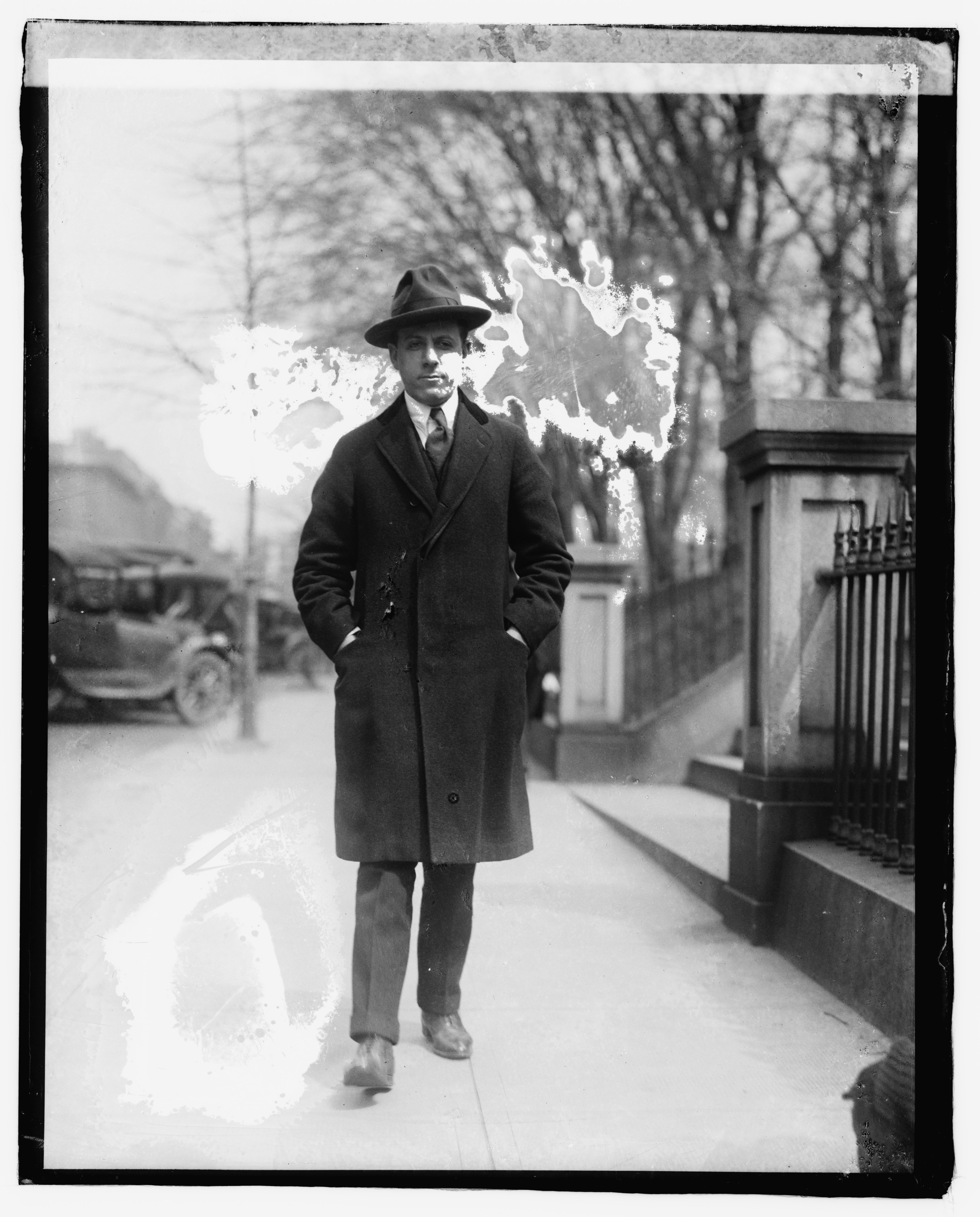
- Lawrence in 1920
- Born: December 25, 1888; Philadelphia, Pennsylvania, U.S.
- Died: February 11, 1973 (aged 84); Sarasota, Florida, U.S.
- Education: Princeton University
- Known for: Founder of U.S. News & World Report

David Lawrence (December 25, 1888 – February 11, 1973) was an American conservative newspaperman.

== Early life and education ==
Lawrence was born in Philadelphia, on December 25, 1888. He attended Princeton University in Princeton, New Jersey, where he graduated as part of the Class of 1910. While at Princeton University, he was a student of Woodrow Wilson.

== Career ==
In 1916, Lawrence became the Washington, D.C. correspondent of New York Evening Post, which was the since-discontinued evening edition of the New York Post.

After Woodrow Wilson's reelection as U.S. president, Wilson fired his White House secretary (chief of staff) Joseph Patrick Tumulty in 1916 to placate anti-Catholic sentiment, which was being espoused from his wife and Colonel Edward M. House, his advisor. Lawrence then successfully interceded on Tumulty's behalf to remain.

== Political views ==
During the presidency of Franklin Roosevelt, Lawrence criticized the New Deal in his 1934 book Beyond the New Deal. His observation of economic activity led him to distinguish between free enterprise and corporatism, and he wrote, "Theoretically, a corporation is a creature of a state."

He sharply criticized the use of the atomic bomb against Japan, compared it to the gas chambers of Nazi concentration camps, and maintained that the United States had become guilty and needed to apologize to the world.

He was a critic of the 1963 March on Washington and called it "the mess in Washington."

== Publisher ==
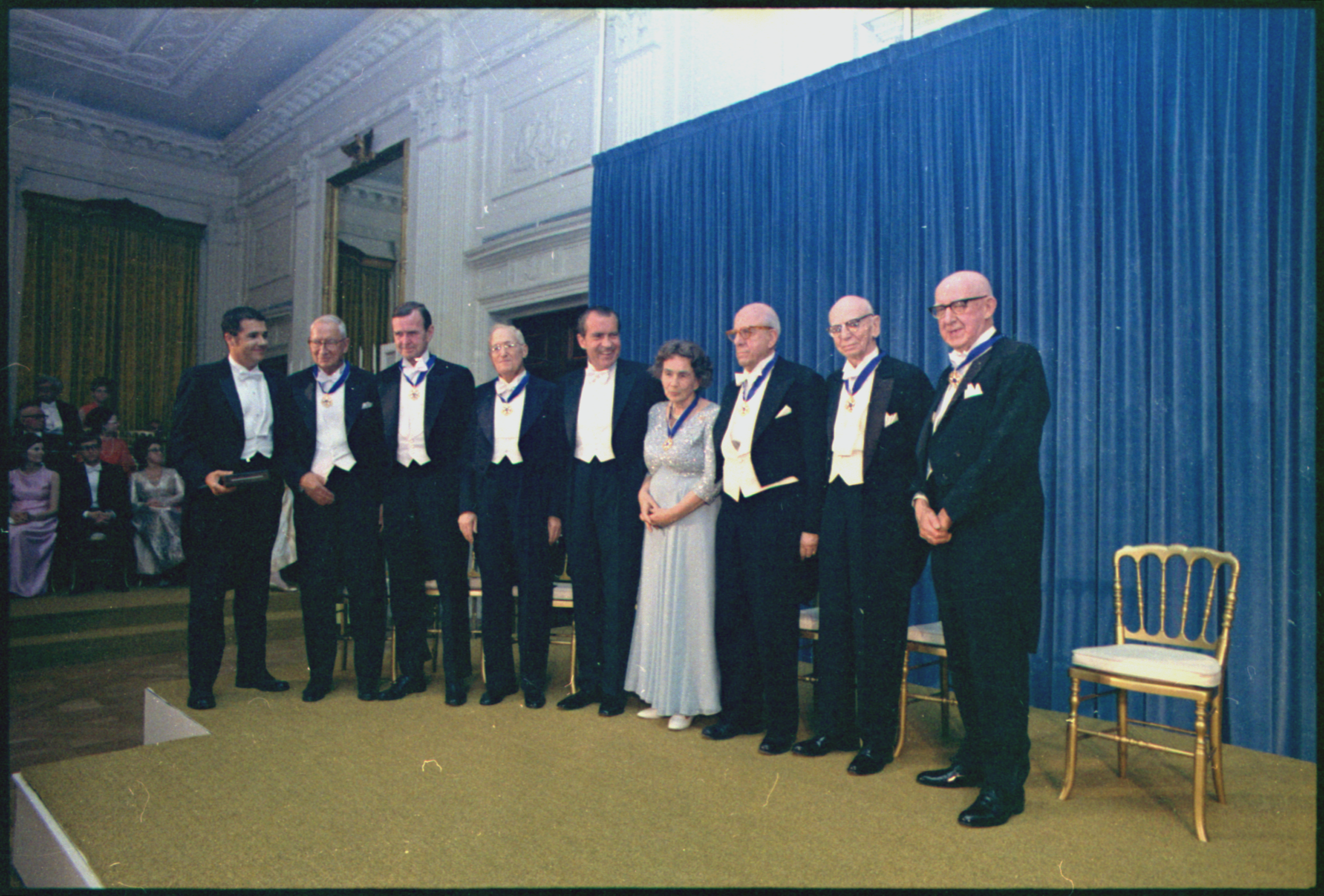
Lawrence (third from right) accepts the Presidential Medal of Freedom from President Richard Nixon on April 22, 1970

In 1926, Lawrence founded United States Daily, a weekly newspaper devoted to covering government. Seven years later, he shut it down to start United States News for an audience of community leaders, businessmen, and politicians. In 1948, United States News merged with Lawrence's two-year-old weekly magazine, World Report, to form the news magazine U.S. News & World Report. At the time of his death, the magazine had a circulation of two million.

== Awards ==
On April 22, 1970, Lawrence was presented with the Presidential Medal of Freedom by President Richard Nixon.

== Personal life ==
Lawrence married Ellanor (Campbell Hayes Daly) Lawrence on July 17, 1918, and they had three children: David Jr., Mark, and Nancy. A foster daughter, Etienne, was married in 1927 to Herbert Sturhahn, a former college football player for Yale University. Ellanor died June 13, 1969. In 1971, to honor her memory, Lawrence gave Fairfax County, Virginia, the land that became Ellanor C. Lawrence Park in Chantilly, Virginia.

== Death ==
On February 11, 1973, Lawrence died of an apparent heart attack at his Sarasota, Florida home.
