= Governorship of Glenn Youngkin =

Glenn Youngkin's tenure as the 74th governor of Virginia

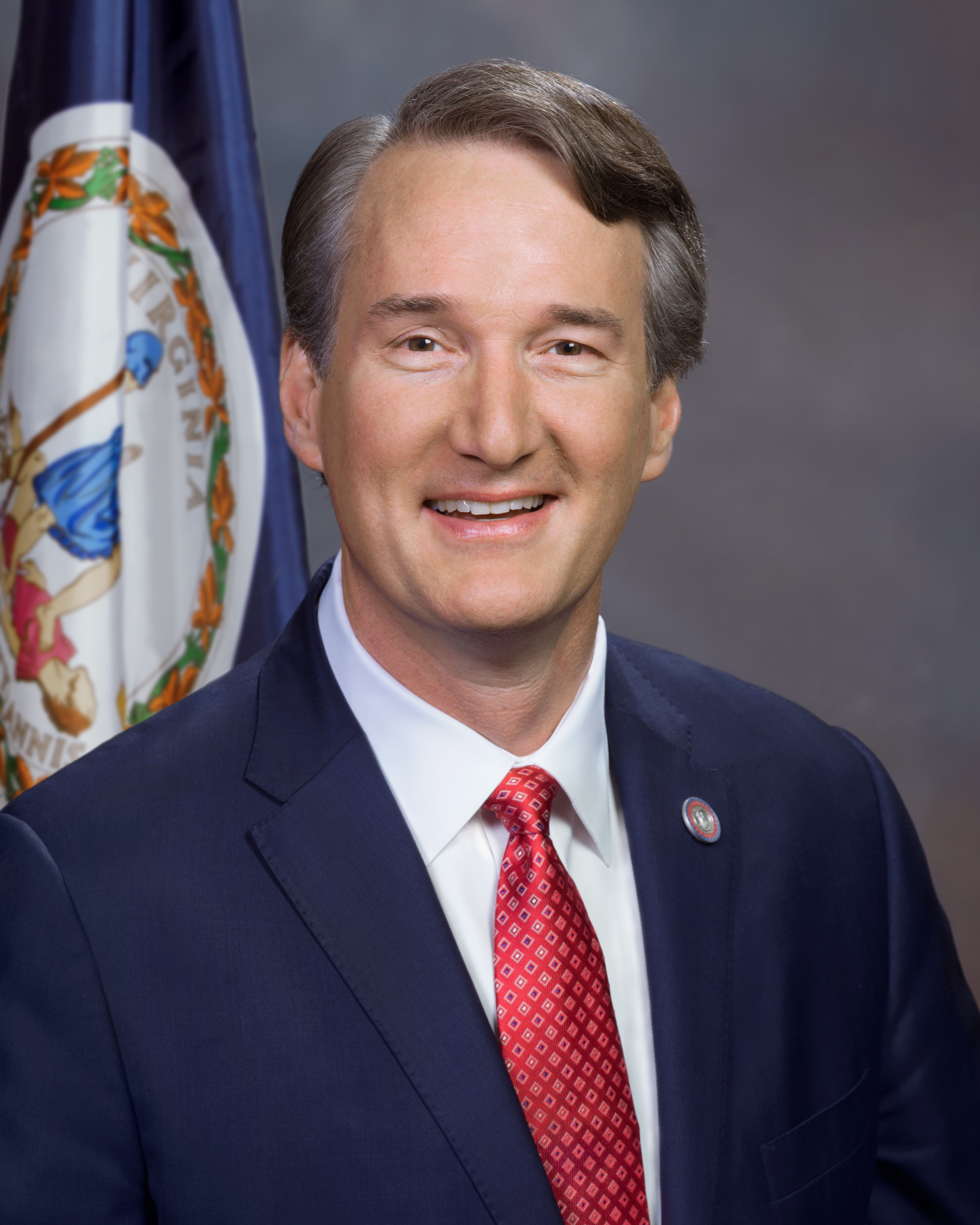
- Governorship of Glenn Youngkin; January 15, 2022 – January 17, 2026
- Party: Republican
- Election: 2021
- Seat: Executive Mansion
- Seal of Virginia

Glenn Youngkin served as the 74th governor of Virginia from January 15, 2022, to January 17, 2026. He was elected in 2021, defeating former Virginia governor Terry McAuliffe 50.58% to 48.64%.

== Inauguration ==
Youngkin was sworn in as governor on January 15, 2022. He took office alongside his Republican ticket mates, Lieutenant Governor Winsome Sears, the first woman of color elected to statewide office in Virginia, and Attorney General Jason Miyares, the first Latino elected to statewide office in the state. The Washington Post called this ticket "historically diverse" and reported that it was a sign of "inroads" made by the Republican Party "in the African American and Latino communities." Former Democratic Governor of Virginia Douglas Wilder commented after the election that Republicans had "one-upped" Democrats with the historic achievement, which, he said, showed that Democrats "can't take the [Black] community for granted."

Youngkin was inaugurated two years into the ongoing COVID-19 pandemic. His first week in office coincided with the January 14–17, 2022 North American winter storm. The Richmond Times-Dispatch reported that the morning before his inauguration, Youngkin participated in a community service project at "the Reconciliation Statue along the Richmond Slave Trail in Shockoe Bottom, which was home to the second largest domestic slave market in the United States before the Civil War." Later that night, an inauguration eve party was held for Youngkin at the Omni Richmond Hotel. Another inauguration eve event for Youngkin was later held at the Science Museum of Virginia. On the night of his inauguration, Youngkin held a celebratory event at the Richmond Main Street Station.

The Washington Post wrote that Youngkin's inaugural address "delivered the blend of religious confidence and boardroom bravado that powered his victory", while The Associated Press characterized the address as one that carried "a tone of bipartisanship and optimism". The Washington Post noted that Youngkin used the address to criticize modern politics as "too toxic", but also wrote that, immediately after the address, Youngkin "stirred partisan rancor" by signing a series of polarizing executive actions. The publication noted that Youngkin's praise for the COVID-19 vaccine "fell flat with the largely mask-free crowd". Along with NPR, it reported that Youngkin's biggest applause was for a line about "removing politics from the classroom".

== Day One executive actions ==
After his inauguration, Youngkin signed eleven executive actions. The first of these bans the teaching of what it calls "inherently divisive concepts" and identifies critical race theory as one such concept. While critical race theory has been widely discussed by teachers at workshops sponsored by the Virginia Department of Education, it has never been endorsed by the department or included in the state's public school curriculum. In his executive order, Youngkin characterized critical race theory and related concepts as "political indoctrination" that "instruct students to only view life through the lens of race and presumes that some students are consciously or unconsciously racist, sexist, or oppressive, and that other students are victims." Frederick Hess, education policy director at the American Enterprise Institute, a conservative think tank, approved of the order as "sensible and thoughtful and well-written".

The Washington Post has noted that while critical race theory specifically refers to "an academic framework that examines how policies and laws perpetuate systemic racism in the United States", the term has been reappropriated by conservatives "as a catchall symbolizing schools’ equity and diversity work." Youngkin's stance on critical race theory has been condemned by leaders of the Virginia Legislative Black Caucus, and according to The Richmond Times-Dispatch, has "alarmed many educators" in the state. Youngkin's critics, the publication wrote, view the banning of critical race theory as an attempt to "whitewash" history and "erase black history".

Two of the executive actions signed by Youngkin on his first day in office rescinded COVID-19 regulations that had been enacted by the previous administration; one of these actions rescinded Virginia's statewide mask mandate for public schools and attempted to make compliance with local public school mask mandates optional; the other rescinded the COVID-19 vaccine mandate for all state employees. Additionally, one of Youngkin's Day One executive orders called for a reevaluation of the workplace safety standards that had been adopted by the Northam administration as a protection against COVID-19.

The other executive actions taken by Youngkin on his first day in office were devoted to firing and replacing the entire Virginia Parole Board, calling for the state's Attorney General to investigate the handling of sexual assaults that had recently occurred in the Loudoun County public school system, initiating reviews of the Virginia Parole Board, the Virginia Department of Motor Vehicles, and the Virginia Employment Commission, creating commissions to combat antisemitism and human trafficking, ordering state agencies under Youngkin's authority to reduce nonmandatory regulations by 25%, and calling for the state to reevaluate its membership in the Regional Greenhouse Gas Initiative.

The Washington Post noted that Youngkin's first executive orders had gone "far beyond the practice of his predecessors in the Executive Mansion over the past 20 years", writing that while each of those predecessors had focused their first executive actions on "less incendiary topics", such as anti-discrimination protections and policy studies, Youngkin's first executive actions, "by contrast...poked a stick directly into a host of polarizing issues". Former Lieutenant Governor of Virginia Bill Bolling, a Republican, condemned Youngkin's repeal of public school mask mandates, saying that it introduced "unnecessary controversy, confusion and litigation" and calling it "in direct conflict with an existing state law." The legality of Youngkin using an executive order to ban the teaching of critical race theory has also been called into question. VPM News reported that Youngkin's critics view the order as "unenforceable". The Washington Post noted that no governor had "banned critical race theory via executive order" before Youngkin and predicted that any such order would face court challenges, writing that it was "not clear" whether Youngkin would be exceeding his legal authority by issuing such an order.

=== Lawsuits ===
Two lawsuits were brought in January against Youngkin's executive order nullifying local public school mask mandates in Virginia. One of the lawsuits was brought by a group of parents from Chesapeake and the other was brought by seven of the state's school boards. The lawsuits argued that Youngkin's executive order infringed upon local control given to Virginia school boards by the state constitution and violated a state law requiring that Virginia public schools comply with CDCP health guidelines "to the maximum extent practicable". The ACLU, representing a group of medically vulnerable students in Virginia, brought an additional lawsuit in February, arguing that Youngkin's policy violated the Americans with Disabilities Act by discriminating against students who would be at high risk if infected by COVID-19. Youngkin called on Virginia parents to cooperate with school principals while the lawsuits proceeded.

A majority of public school districts in Virginia refused to comply with the executive order and continued to enforce local mask mandates into February. On February 4, an Arlington County judge ruled to allow mask mandates to be temporarily retained in the seven school districts that had sued to stop Youngkin's order while their case proceeded through the courts. Three days later, the Virginia Supreme Court dismissed the lawsuit brought by the group of parents from Chesapeake; the dismissal was for procedural reasons and did not rule on the legality of Youngkin's executive order, nor did it overturn the ruling that had been issued that week in Arlington County. The same day that the Chesapeake lawsuit was dismissed, the Youngkin administration joined a lawsuit against the Loudoun County school system, brought by a group of parents in that county, who were challenging their school system's decision to continue enforcing a mask mandate.

School systems throughout Virginia began dropping their mask mandates in mid-February, after Youngkin signed a bill requiring that they do so by March 1. The ACLU expanded the scope of its lawsuit against the Youngkin administration to include this new law, and on March 23, 2022, a federal judge decided the lawsuit by ruling that school districts in Virginia could choose to require masking in areas frequented by the plaintiffs. The ruling did not overturn Youngkin's executive order or the state law and only applies to school systems attended by the plaintiffs. Following an appeal by the Youngkin administration, a settlement was reached in December 2022. The settlement allows mask mandates under similar terms to those established by the March court ruling.

== Cabinet ==
Youngkin began announcing nominations for his sixteen-member cabinet on December 20, 2021, and did not finish the process until after his inauguration. According to The Washington Post, Youngkin assembled his cabinet at a slower pace than prior Virginia governors. Commenting on this process, the publication wrote in December 2021, "The slow pace has turned the quadrennial parlor game of predicting Cabinet picks into a far more protracted and opaque process [than usual], with lobbyists, interest groups and other Richmond insiders left guessing what the new administration might look like. Youngkin’s practice of sidestepping many policy specifics during the campaign has only heightened the anticipation."

Several news outlets noted that Youngkin's focus on education as a campaign priority was reflected in his decision to begin announcing his cabinet nominees with his choice for Secretary of Education. Although Youngkin suggested while campaigning for the Republican gubernatorial nomination that he would name his then-opponent Kirk Cox, a former Speaker of the House of Delegates, to the position, he instead chose Aimee Rogstad Guidera, the founder of a data firm focused on fostering student achievement.

Five of Youngkin's cabinet nominees were women and three were African American. Many of his nominees were brought in from other states, and only a few of his nominees had any prior government experience. The Washington Post wrote of these nominees, "Their newcomer status is on brand for Youngkin, who ran touting his lack of political experience as an asset. But it also presents the new administration with a steep learning curve."

Four of Youngkin's cabinet nominees served under previous Virginia governors: Youngkin's Secretary of the Commonwealth nominee, Kay Coles James, served as Secretary of Health and Human Resources under Governor George Allen; Youngkin's Secretary of Labor nominee, George Bryan Slater, served as Secretary of Administration under Governor Jim Gilmore; Youngkin's Secretary of Health and Human Resources nominee, John Littel, served as Deputy Secretary of Health and Human Resources under Allen; and Youngkin's Secretary of Transportation nominee, W. Sheppard "Shep" Miller III, served on the Commonwealth Transportation Board under Northam.

Several of Youngkin's cabinet nominees were from the private sector, while three – James, Littel, and Chief Diversity Officer Angela Sailor – worked for the Heritage Foundation, a conservative think tank. James was the first Black woman to serve as president of the foundation, Sailor was an executive there at the same time, and Littel worked there as a lawyer. Youngkin's Secretary of Commerce nominee, Caren Merrick, was Chief Executive of the Virginia Ready Initiative, described by The Washington Post as "a nonprofit organization that Youngkin founded in 2020 to fund workforce training for people struggling during the economic shutdown linked to the coronavirus pandemic." Daniel Gade, who ran unsuccessfully as the Republican nominee in Virginia's 2020 Senate election, was named by Youngkin as commissioner of Virginia's Department of Veterans Services, serving under Youngkin's Secretary of Veterans Affairs, Craig Crenshaw. Jeff Goettman, who served as a Treasury Department official in the first Trump administration before becoming the chief operating officer of Youngkin's campaign, was chosen by Youngkin to serve as chief of staff.

For the role of counselor, a cabinet-level position, Youngkin chose Richard Cullen, an attorney described by The Washington Post as "the ultimate Richmond insider". Cullen had been chairman of McGuireWoods, and in the 1990s, served out the remainder of Jim Gilmore's term as Attorney General of Virginia, after Gilmore resigned to run for governor. The Washington Post reported that Cullen's appointment was "widely seen as a nod to the establishment class" and theorized that the choice "could suggest that Youngkin does not intend to thoroughly disrupt 'politics as usual' in a state where cozy ties between government and business interests have long been lauded – and derided – as 'the Virginia way.'" The publication further wrote, "At the very least, the choice indicates that Youngkin wants an experienced political hand on his team as he tries to get his arms around the state’s sprawling bureaucracy."

=== Chief Diversity Officer ===
Youngkin finished announcing his cabinet nominees on January 19, 2022, with his choice for Chief Diversity Officer. This position was established by Youngkin's immediate predecessor, Ralph Northam, in response to a scandal involving racist imagery appearing on Northam's medical school yearbook page – a scandal that nearly caused Northam to resign from office. The idea for a Chief Diversity Officer was born out of a commitment made by Northam to focus the remainder of his term on advancing racial equity in Virginia. Youngkin did not announce a nomination for Chief Diversity Officer until after his inauguration, which led to media speculation that he would be eliminating the position. Youngkin's nominee for Chief Diversity Officer, Angela Sailor, was an executive at the Heritage Foundation and held multiple roles in George W. Bush's presidential administration.

Virginia's Chief Diversity Officer oversaw the state's Office of Diversity, Equity and Inclusion, which was designed under Northam to "address systemic inequities" existing within the state government. Upon announcing Sailor's nomination to serve in his cabinet, Youngkin issued an executive order restructuring the agency. The order said that the agency would "be an ambassador for unborn children", devote resources towards emphasizing parental involvement in public school education, take an increased role in "[assisting] Virginians living with disabilities and bringing Virginians of different faiths together", elevate "viewpoint diversity in higher education", and focus on creating "equal opportunity" for every Virginian. Youngkin sought to rename the agency as the Office of Diversity, Opportunity and Inclusion, but a legislative proposal to do so was voted down in the state senate.

=== Andrew Wheeler nomination ===
Youngkin's initial nominee for Secretary of Natural Resources, Andrew Wheeler, was voted down on a party-line vote in the Democratic-controlled State Senate. Wheeler had served as Administrator of the Environmental Protection Agency in the Trump administration, and before that, worked as a coal lobbyist. His tenure at the EPA was marked by reversals of environmental regulations that had been implemented by the Obama administration, and his nomination to serve in Youngkin's cabinet was heavily criticized by environmental advocates. A letter signed by 150 former EPA employees was sent to the Virginia legislature expressing opposition to Wheeler's nomination.

As noted by The Washington Post, cabinet nominees almost always receive bipartisan support in Virginia state politics; although prior Virginia governor Bob McDonnell withdrew one of his cabinet nominees in response to Democratic opposition, only one cabinet nominee before Wheeler had ever been formally voted down by the Virginia state legislature – Daniel G. LeBlanc, an AFL–CIO chief whose nomination by Tim Kaine to serve as Secretary of the Commonwealth was rejected by Republicans in 2006. Wheeler served as acting Secretary of Natural Resources until mid-March 2022, when Youngkin appointed him as a senior advisor, a role that does not require confirmation by the legislature. In June of that year, Youngkin appointed Wheeler to direct the Office of Regulatory Management, an office newly established by Youngkin through executive order for the purpose of reducing state regulatory requirements. Just as Wheeler had done with his advisory role, he was able to assume his role at the Office of Regulatory Management without legislative approval.

Leading up to the vote on Wheeler's nomination to serve as Secretary of Natural Resources, Republicans in the Virginia House of Delegates retaliated against Democrats for opposing the nomination, by both blocking the reappointment of a judge to the State Corporation Commission and leaving two Virginia Supreme Court vacancies open. After Wheeler's nomination was defeated in the State Senate, House Republicans, with Youngkin's support, announced plans to reject about 1,000 appointees to state boards; the appointees had all been nominated by Northam, and it was a long-standing custom in Virginia politics for an outgoing governor's nominees to be confirmed with bipartisan support. Many of the nominees had already been serving in their positions for several months. After Democrats responded by threatening to reject all future appointments made by Youngkin, Republicans scaled back their plan and rejected only eleven of Northam's nominees. The rejected nominees had been appointed to the Virginia State Board of Education, the State Air Pollution Control Board, the State Water Control Board, the Virginia Safety and Health Codes Board, and the Virginia Marine Resources Commission. According to Republican leadership in the Virginia House of Delegates, vacancies were created on these specific boards so that Youngkin would have greater influence over boards related to his main policy priorities. Democrats retaliated in turn by rejecting four of Youngkin's five nominees to the Virginia Parole Board and one of his nominees to the Virginia Safety and Health Codes Board.

According to The Washington Post, conflict continued to escalate throughout the 2022 legislative session between Youngkin and Democratic state legislators as a result of the dispute that had begun with Wheeler's nomination. Youngkin went on to issue more vetoes during that session than any of his immediate predecessors had done during their own first years in office. All of the bills vetoed by Youngkin had been sponsored by Democrats and had passed the legislature with bipartisan support. In several cases, Youngkin vetoed bills sponsored by Democratic state senators while signing identical bills that had been sponsored by Republican delegates. It is common for identical bills to be passed in both chambers of the Virginia legislature, and it is considered standard for governors to sign both versions of such bills. In response to Youngkin's vetoes, The Washington Post wrote, "Typically a governor signs both versions, allowing both sponsors bragging rights for getting a bill passed into law. Longtime state legislators said they could not think of a case in which a governor signed one bill and vetoed its companion." The publication further wrote that "the vetoes were widely seen as payback" for the portion of Youngkin's nominees that had been rejected by Democrats.

=== Unpaid advisors ===
The Youngkin administration had drawn notice from both The Washington Post and The Richmond Times-Dispatch for its use of Matthew Moran and Aubrey Layne as unpaid advisors.

Moran served pro bono in the administration during the first half of 2022 as both Deputy Chief of Staff and Director of Policy and Legislative Affairs. He did so while on paid leave from two political consulting firms; one of these firms "runs public affairs campaigns designed to influence legislators through such things as TV ads and polling", according to The Washington Post. That publication, along with The Richmond Times-Dispatch, noted that Moran's role in the Youngkin administration drew scrutiny for presenting a possible conflict of interest. The former publication wrote at the time that while there was precedent for Virginia governors to have unpaid advisors, "Moran’s situation is especially unusual, because he works full time for the administration with a state title, but without upfront disclosure that he’s a volunteer on someone else’s payroll." In June 2022, the same publication wrote that Moran was "transitioning to a new role as [Youngkin's] full-time senior political adviser".

Aubrey Layne, who served as Secretary of Finance in the Northam administration, has served as an unpaid advisor to his successor in the Youngkin administration, Stephen E. Cummings, and has done so while serving as an executive at Sentara Healthcare.

Richard Cullen, Youngkin's counselor, had said that he personally determined both Layne and Moran's roles in the administration to be in compliance with state ethics rules.

== Abortion ==
Youngkin describes himself as "pro-life" but says he supports legal access to abortion in cases of rape, incest, or protecting the mother's life. During his gubernatorial campaign, he criticized the Texas Heartbeat Act, which bans abortions around the sixth week of pregnancy except for when needed to protect the life of the mother. At that time, Youngkin stated his preference for a "pain threshold bill", which bans abortion at around twenty weeks. In July 2021, while running for governor, he was caught on a hot mic telling an activist that he would "start going on offense" against abortion rights if elected governor but would largely avoid the topic until then, saying "as a campaign topic, sadly, that in fact won’t win my independent votes that I have to get."

As governor, Youngkin introduced a failed amendment to the state budget, that if adopted by the legislature, would have banned the state government from funding abortion services in cases of severe fetal abnormalities. Youngkin claimed that this would have made Virginia's policy on the public funding of abortion services consistent with the federal Hyde Amendment, which allows it only in cases of rape, incest, or to protect the mother's life. In actuality, as noted by the Richmond Public Interest Law Review, Virginia policy on the matter still would have been broader than the Hyde Amendment, as the state law also allows public funding of abortion services when needed to protect the pregnant mother's health.

In May 2022, following the leaked draft opinion of Dobbs v. Jackson Women's Health Organization, Youngkin joined with Maryland Governor Larry Hogan in calling on the federal government to intervene against peaceful protests targeting the homes of conservative Supreme Court Justices living in Virginia and Maryland. Commenting on these abortion rights protests, Youngkin said, "We have moments where common sense needs to prevail. And common sense here fully dictates that the ability to, in fact, demonstrate and express your views is protected under the First Amendment. It’s just not appropriate nor is it legal to do it at the residence of justices." Youngkin was criticized by some conservatives for seeking federal action rather than enforcing a state law that bars protesters from targeting private residences. The state law was dismissed as "weak" by Youngkin. The Washington Post described the state law's constitutionality as unclear while noting that "enforcement would be up to local authorities in Fairfax County, not the governor." The publication noted that Youngkin and Hogan both believed the protests to be in violation of "a federal law that forbids demonstrations intended to sway judges on pending cases". Youngkin sought to block the protesters by having a perimeter established around Justice Samuel Alito's neighborhood, but his request was denied by Fairfax County officials, on the grounds that they believed such a perimeter would have been unconstitutional. In June 2022, Youngkin responded to the protests by introducing an amendment to the state budget, that if adopted, would have made it a felony in Virginia to participate in any protest seeking to intimidate or influence a judge. That budget amendment was defeated after receiving bipartisan opposition in the state legislature.

After the final opinion in Dobbs v. Jackson was issued, Youngkin expressed his support for the ruling and announced that he would sign "any bill" restricting abortion access in Virginia. He then tasked four Republican state lawmakers with developing legislation on the topic. Advocating for a 15-week abortion ban, he acknowledged that there would be limitations on what could pass through the State Senate, controlled by Democrats, and suggested a 20-week ban as a possible compromise. Either ban as proposed by Youngkin would have included exceptions for rape, incest, or protecting the mother's life. Youngkin had indicated that he would support restricting abortion access in Virginia beyond a 15-week ban if he was able to garner enough votes to do so.

== COVID-19 ==
Youngkin supported the COVID-19 vaccination effort but opposed mask and vaccine mandates. He and his family were vaccinated. In his first address to the General Assembly, he emphasized his position on the state's vaccination efforts by stating, "Speaking to you as your governor, I’ll never tell you what you must do. But speaking to you as your neighbor and a friend, I strongly encourage you to get the vaccine."

Shortly before taking office, Youngkin announced that he would challenge the Biden administration's employer vaccine mandate. After the U.S. Supreme Court ruled in favor of the mandate for certain health care workers but against the mandate for other private employers, Youngkin co-signed a letter with West Virginia Governor Jim Justice, asking the Biden administration to exempt rural and state run hospitals from the mandate, citing staffing shortages at many of those hospitals. In October 2022, after the Centers for Disease Control and Prevention's recommended that the COVID-19 vaccine be added to each state's list of required immunizations for school children, Youngkin stated that he would oppose any effort by the legislature to implement the recommendation.

While running for governor, Youngkin said that he would model his public school mask policy after that of Florida Governor Ron DeSantis by banning local school boards from implementing their own mask mandates. Youngkin reversed this position later in the campaign, saying through his PR team that although he opposed Virginia's statewide public school mask mandate, he would give local school boards the discretion to implement their own mask policies. After winning the election, he re-emphasized his intention to repeal the statewide mandate while still allowing for local mandates. On his first day in office, January 15, 2022, he reversed his position again, signing an executive order that both repealed the statewide mandate and attempted to nullify any local mandates. This executive order was challenged by two lawsuits contending that it was in violation of state law at the time and exceeded Youngkin's constitutional authority. It was also challenged by the ACLU in a lawsuit arguing that the order was discriminatory against medically vulnerable students. Youngkin called on Virginia parents to cooperate with school principals while the lawsuits proceeded. On February 16, 2022, Youngkin signed a bill that made masking optional in all public schools throughout Virginia. The bill passed along mostly party lines and took effect on March 1. The ACLU's lawsuit against the Youngkin administration was decided on March 23, in a ruling that maintains Youngkin's ban on school mask mandates except for in areas frequented by students that were represented in the lawsuit. The Youngkin administration appealed the ruling, and in December 2022, reached a settlement with the plaintiffs. As described by The Associated Press, that settlement "largely tracks the terms" of the court ruling from March. The settlement allows mask mandates to be implemented by Virginia public schools in areas frequented by the plaintiffs but also allows alternative seating or class assignments for any student impacted by such a mandate who does not want to wear a mask. Although the settlement applies only to students represented in the lawsuit, the ACLU has expressed the view that the settlement established a precedent allowing the same accommodations upon request for any medically vulnerable students attending Virginia public schools.

Two other executive actions signed by Youngkin on his first day in office related to his pandemic response policies. One rescinded the COVID-19 vaccine mandate for all state employees; the other called for a reevaluation of the workplace safety standards that the Northam administration had adopted as a pandemic mitigation strategy. On February 16, 2022, Youngkin convened the Virginia Department of Labor and Industry's Safety and Health Codes Board to vote on whether to revoke those safety standards. A few days before the vote, House Republicans rejected the nominations of two members that had been appointed to the board by Northam; both members were expected to vote against revoking the safety standards. Their nominations were rejected as part of a larger process of expelling Northam appointees from several state boards, which was undertaken by Republicans in response to Democrats defeating Youngkin's nomination of Andrew Wheeler to serve as a cabinet secretary.

The remaining members of the Safety and Health Codes Board voted 7 to 3 in favor of recommending that the safety standards be revoked. Following a public comment period, the board reconvened on March 21 and voted to officially revoke the safety standards. Virginia had been the first state to adopt workplace safety standards in response to the COVID-19 pandemic, and the standards, which included a mask mandate for workers in high-risk indoor areas, officially ended on March 23, 2022.

Upon taking office, Youngkin extended a limited state of emergency that had been implemented by the Northam administration ten days earlier to increase hospital capacity and allow medical professionals licensed in other states to practice in Virginia. The extension was originally set to last until February 21, 2022 but was renewed through March 22 of that year.

In January 2022, the Virginia Department of Health, under Youngkin's authority, became one of the first states to cease efforts at contact tracing every positive case of COVID-19. Health officials with the department explained that the decision was made primarily due to the increased difficulty of contact tracing the omicron variant. These officials further explained that the policy would allow the department to better focus its resources on responding to "outbreaks and cases in high risk settings" and that individuals who test positive should continue to personally notify contacts.

In May 2022, Youngkin announced that on July 5 of that year, he would be scaling back the telework policy for Virginia's executive branch employees, which had been expanded two years earlier by Northam in response to the pandemic. Under Youngkin's policy, those employees can telework one day a week or on a temporary basis with approval from the head of their agency, two days a week with approval from a cabinet secretary, and three or more days a week with approval from Youngkin's chief of staff. As noted by The Richmond-Times Dispatch, "employees of state colleges and universities, legislative or judicial agencies, or independent commissions and authorities" are all exempt from the policy.

Youngkin argued that his telework policy would lead to increased innovation and improved customer service across state agencies. Democrats criticized the policy, arguing that it would endanger state workers amid the ongoing pandemic while causing retention problems for state agencies. They called on Youngkin to maintain Northam's policy until at least after Labor Day, so as to ease pressure on state employees struggling to find childcare over the summer. Youngkin's policy not only rescinds Northam's policy but gives state agencies less discretion to approve telework arrangements than they had held before the pandemic began. The Richmond Times-Dispatch reported that Youngkin's policy diverged from private sector trends favoring telework options and could lead to challenges for state employees in rural areas with particularly long commutes. In early June, the Youngkin administration missed a self-imposed deadline for approving telework requests. In between Youngkin's announcement of the policy and the July 5 start date of the policy, hundreds of state employees resigned.

== Criminal justice ==
=== FOIA law ===
In 2022, Youngkin signed a bill reversing the effects of a 2021 amendment to the Virginia Freedom of Information Act. Under the 2021 amendment, which had been signed by Youngkin's predecessor, Ralph Northam, law enforcement was required to fulfill all requests for files pertaining to closed investigations, although they were allowed to redact any information that could violate privacy and were not allowed to release audio or visual materials depicting victims to anyone other than those victims or their families. According to The Washington Post, before this amendment was enacted, law enforcement in Virginia "typically used their discretion to deny access to virtually all of their files, from all requesters".

The bill signed by Youngkin in 2022 restored discretion to law enforcement over whether to release files pertaining to closed investigations but still requires that access to such files be granted to the families of victims and to attorneys working on post-conviction proceedings. Under the bill, if law enforcement chooses to fulfill any other request, they can do so only after victims involved in the investigation have been notified and given a chance to object; any victim who objects can then file for an injunction, at which point a judge would determine the outcome of the request. Youngkin's reform of Virginia's FOIA law gained some bipartisan support in the Virginia legislature but was opposed by the Innocence Project.

=== Policing ===
On March 1, 2022, Youngkin vetoed a bipartisan bill that would have shifted authority for hiring a local auditor of police misconduct in Arlington County from the County Manager to the County Board. The auditor would be tasked with working alongside a civilian oversight board that Arlington County had established one year earlier in response to the racial justice protests of 2020. As a Dillon Rule state, Virginia localities require approval from the state government to make decisions over any matter that state law has not explicitly given them control over, and the Arlington County Board had wanted authority for hiring the auditor, so as to ensure the position's independence from local law enforcement, which is overseen by the County Manager, who also hires the county's police chief.

The Washington Post described the vetoed legislation as "esoteric but noteworthy". The publication wrote that Youngkin's veto "appeared to tie the bill...to much broader debates over how local governments should scrutinize police" and was largely inspired by Youngkin's displeasure with the civilian oversight board, which had already been approved. While explaining his veto, Youngkin criticized the auditor's position as one with disciplinary powers over police officers – according to the author of the vetoed legislation, Youngkin mischaracterized the position, as the auditor does not have disciplinary powers. This was the first veto of Youngkin's governorship.

Later in 2022, Youngkin signed a bill downscaling the Marcus alert system, which had been established by Northam about two years earlier in response to both the George Floyd protests of 2020 and the 2018 killing in Richmond of Marcus-David Peters. Wherever implemented, the Marcus alert system requires that mental health professionals be involved in responding to any mental health crises reported to 911. Certain localities in Virginia began adopting the system in late 2021. When signed into law by Northam, the system was required to be implemented statewide by July 2026. The legislation signed by Youngkin in 2022 exempts Virginia localities with populations of under 40,000 from having to adopt the Marcus alert system. This exemption applies to about 67% of Virginia localities and over 19% of the state's population. It was adopted due to concerns about the cost of implementing the system statewide.

When first established by Northam, the Marcus alert system was criticized by Peters' sister, Princess Blanding, for its slow adoption process and for continuing to give law enforcement a significant role in responding to many mental health crisis situations. Her belief that the Marcus alert system needed to be improved upon led her to run as an independent candidate against Youngkin and McAuliffe in Virginia's 2021 gubernatorial election. Although Youngkin's legislation downscaling the system gained some bipartisan support in the state legislature, it was opposed by Blanding and most House Democrats.

Another bill signed by Youngkin in 2022 bans law enforcement agencies in Virginia from using quotas for ticket-writing or arrests. This bill, which was proposed by the Virginia Police Benevolent Association, also states that "the number of arrests made or summonses issued by a law-enforcement officer shall not be used as the sole criterion for evaluating the law-enforcement officer's job performance." Both parties in the state legislature supported the bill. Although as originally written, the bill provided for violations of its bans to be investigated by the FBI, this provision was removed from the final bill.

=== Sentence credits ===
An amendment that Youngkin introduced to the 2022 state budget limited the number of inmates who could qualify for an expanded early release program that was scheduled to begin later that summer. The program allows inmates in Virginia to earn time off their sentences through good behavior credits. It had been expanded through legislation signed in 2020 by Youngkin's predecessor, Ralph Northam, so that Virginia's cap on how many good behavior credits could be earned was raised for most inmates. As this expansion of the program was originally designed, the newly available credits could not be used to reduce sentences for violent crimes but could be used by inmates convicted of violent crimes to reduce any concurrent or consecutive sentences that had been imposed for nonviolent crimes. Youngkin and other Republicans characterized this aspect of the program as an unintentional loophole that needed correcting. Democrats largely disagreed with that characterization, arguing that the expanded program had been intentionally designed to give violent offenders the ability to reduce sentences unrelated to violent offenses. Youngkin's amendment was adopted by the General Assembly along mostly party lines. It made inmates convicted of violent crimes fully ineligible for the expanded program, meaning that these inmates could not use the newly available credits to reduce any sentences.

Although the expanded early release program was approved by Northam in 2020, it did not take effect until July 1, 2022. Because the newly available credits were made applicable retroactively for anyone who would have earned them earlier in their sentences, about 550 inmates convicted of violent crimes were set to be released once the law took effect in July 2022. Youngkin's amendment was approved a few weeks before these inmates would have been released. As a result, these inmates were not released at that time, even though they had already been told of their planned release.

== Economy ==
During his campaign for governor, Youngkin frequently said that Virginia's economy was "in the ditch". Some political scientists, such as Mark Rozell, considered this an unusual position, since throughout the campaign, Virginia had low unemployment, a budget surplus, and a AAA bond rating. The state had also been rated that year by CNBC as the Top State for Business. Youngkin argued against the merits of the CNBC rating, stating that it put too much emphasis on inclusivity and noting Virginia's poor ratings in the "cost of living" and "cost of doing business" categories. During Youngkin's first year in office, Virginia lost its top spot on the CNBC list, after having earned that spot twice in a row during Northam's governorship. The lower ranking under Youngkin was due to Virginia earning worse scores in the "life, health and inclusion" and "workforce" categories.

=== Taxes ===
The Washington Post noted that more than two months after winning the Republican nomination, Youngkin had "yet to disclose any formal economic plan." One of Youngkin's main proposals at that stage of the race was an elimination of Virginia's individual income tax. According to NPR, this proposal received "criticism from both Democrats and Republicans that doing so would wipe out around 70% of Virginia's General Fund." Before the end of his campaign, Youngkin retracted his proposal to eliminate the tax, calling it "aspirational" and saying, "In Virginia, we can't get rid of income tax, but we sure can try to bring it down."

In late August 2021, Youngkin announced a series of more modest tax cut proposals. These included eliminating the grocery tax, suspending the gas tax increase, offering a one-time rebate on income tax, doubling the standard deduction on income tax, cutting the retirement tax on veterans' income, implementing voter approval for any increase to local real estate property taxes, and offering a tax holiday for small businesses. Upon their announcement, the Associated Press called these proposals "the most wide-ranging and detailed look at the priorities of a potential Youngkin administration". Had these proposals gone on to be enacted in full, they would have amounted to $1.8 billion in one-time tax cuts and $1.4 billion in recurring tax cuts. During the campaign, Youngkin proposed paying for much of his proposed tax cuts with the state's budget surplus, which at the time, was projected to total $2.6 billion. Although The Washington Post and NPR both noted that much of that revenue would be unavailable for tax cuts, since state law required that over half of the amount be devoted to the state's "rainy day" reserve fund, water quality improvement fund, and transportation fund, Virginia's budget surplus continued to grow, and by the end of Northam's term, was projected to total at least $13.4 billion for the state's then-upcoming budget cycle.

As his campaign's senior economic advisor, Youngkin hired Stephen Moore, who had helped oversee significant tax cuts in Kansas several years earlier when Sam Brownback was in office as that state's governor. NPR noted towards the end of the Virginia gubernatorial campaign that Youngkin "sourced much of his fiscal agenda from [Moore]." In response to Moore's hiring, The Washington Post described the Brownback tax cuts as "an experiment widely seen as a failure, leading the state to slash spending for priorities such as education and transportation when revenue dried up". The publication noted that the tax cuts were ultimately repealed "on a bipartisan vote". Youngkin's Democratic gubernatorial opponent, Terry McAuliffe, cited the economic downturn in Kansas as a way to critique Youngkin's economic platform. Moore acknowledged after joining the Youngkin campaign that the Brownback tax cuts had negatively impacted the Kansas economy but argued that they should be perceived as an anomaly, saying that several other states "did really well when they lowered taxes".

In 2022, Youngkin signed a two-year, $165 billion state budget featuring $4 billion in tax cuts. According to The Washington Post, the "centerpiece" of this budget was "a big increase in the standard deduction for personal income tax." Rather than doubling the standard deduction, as Youngkin had proposed, the budget increased it by about 80%, raising it from $4,500 to $8,000 for individuals and from $9,000 to $16,000 for couples filing jointly. The budget included one-time tax rebates and a partial elimination of Virginia's grocery tax, both of which aligned with Northam's own outgoing budget proposals rather than with Youngkin's preferred tax policies. As Northam had proposed, the one-time tax rebates amounted to $250 for individuals and $500 for couples, slightly less than Youngkin's desired $300 for individuals and $600 for couples, and although the final budget enacted Northam and Youngkin's shared goal of eliminating a 1.5% grocery tax that had been levied by the state, Democrats blocked Youngkin's additional proposal to eliminate a separate 1% grocery tax levied by Virginia localities. Fully included in the budget was Youngkin's proposal to enact a tax exemption of up to $40,000 a year for military pensions. According to The Washington Post, the exemption will be "phased in over several years." Another proposal of Northam's included in the budget was making up to 15% of the earned income tax credit refundable. This policy, designed to benefit low-income tax filers, was described by The Richmond-Times Dispatch as "a longtime Democratic priority" and had been opposed by Republicans. It was included in the budget as a compromise between the two parties.

Youngkin's goal of offering relief from the state's gas tax was blocked by the legislature along mostly party lines. Democrats argued that the plan proposed by Youngkin would have deprived the state of revenue for transportation projects while offering insufficient relief to consumers. According to WVTF, a Virginia NPR affiliate, it was estimated that about one-third of the savings from Youngkin's gas tax holiday proposal would have been kept by the oil industry, while about one-quarter of the savings would have gone to out-of-state drivers. Youngkin acknowledged that his proposal may not have resulted in significant savings for Virginians, saying, "We can’t guarantee anything". He opposed a Democratic counter proposal to send direct payments to Virginia car owners. Both WTOP and WRIC estimated that Youngkin's proposal for suspending the gas tax would have decreased funding for Virginia transportation projects by about $400 million.

During the 2022 legislative session, Youngkin failed to enact a proposal of his that would have required Virginia localities with rising real estate values to either gain approval through public referendums for any increases in revenue resulting from local real estate taxes or else lower their local real estate tax rates. This proposal was described by the Youngkin administration as "a pillar" of its tax plan.

Even though the budget signed by Youngkin in 2022 passed with bipartisan support, it was opposed by several Democrats who argued that too much of the state's record surplus was spent on tax cuts at the expense of funding for affordable housing, mental health services, gun violence prevention, and transportation.

=== Affordable housing and tenant protections ===
The state budget signed by Youngkin in 2022 included a $150 million investment in the Virginia Housing Trust Fund, which is devoted to providing affordable housing in the state. This amounted to half the total Northam had proposed investing in the fund. According to WVTF, a Virginia NPR affiliate, the state would need to invest $5 billion annually to fully address its affordable housing needs. Youngkin has said that he opposes any further investments in affordable housing.

In 2022, Youngkin vetoed a bipartisan bill that would have given judges the ability to mandate that landlords address code violations. Under current Virginia law, negligent landlords can be fined or have their properties condemned, but localities have no way to mandate that safety hazards be addressed by landlords. In explaining his veto, Youngkin called the legislation "unnecessary" and said that tenants should share responsibility with landlords for maintaining safe living conditions.

=== Labor rights and public services ===
Youngkin had said that he intended to continue efforts begun under his predecessor, Ralph Northam, to modernize the Virginia Employment Commission, which, according to The Washington Post, "struggled with outdated computer systems and a lack of staffing during the heightened demands of the pandemic." On his first day in office, Youngkin signed an executive order calling for a review of the state agency. In March 2022, his administration was awarded a grant from the Biden administration's Labor Department to combat inequities in the Virginia Employment Commission's operations. The grant was made available through the American Rescue Plan Act of 2021. Virginia was among the first states to receive such a grant, because, according to The Washington Post, its application to participate in the program had been one of the "most thorough". Youngkin's administration has not announced its plans for the grant money.

Youngkin had also said that he intended to continue efforts begun under Northam to expand broadband access in Virginia.

Youngkin opposed the gradual minimum wage increase that was initiated in Virginia by the Northam administration, arguing that the eventual target of $15 an hour will cause the state to "lose jobs". He supports Virginia's right-to-work law and has promised to veto any legislation repealing it. He has also backed the idea of repealing both collective bargaining rights for public employees and the requirement that all public works use project labor agreements.

=== Trade and economic development ===
In April 2023, Youngkin led an international trade mission to Japan, South Korea, and Taiwan, where he met with president Tsai Ing-wen and announced plans to open a Virginia–Taiwan trade office. He officially announced the opening of the office in New Taipei, Taiwan in September. The establishment of the office was in response to Youngkin's Executive Order 25 to strengthen the business relationship between Virginia and Taiwan. The office was Virginia's fourth international office, after Virginia Economic Development Partnership's offices in Germany, Japan, and South Korea.

== Education ==
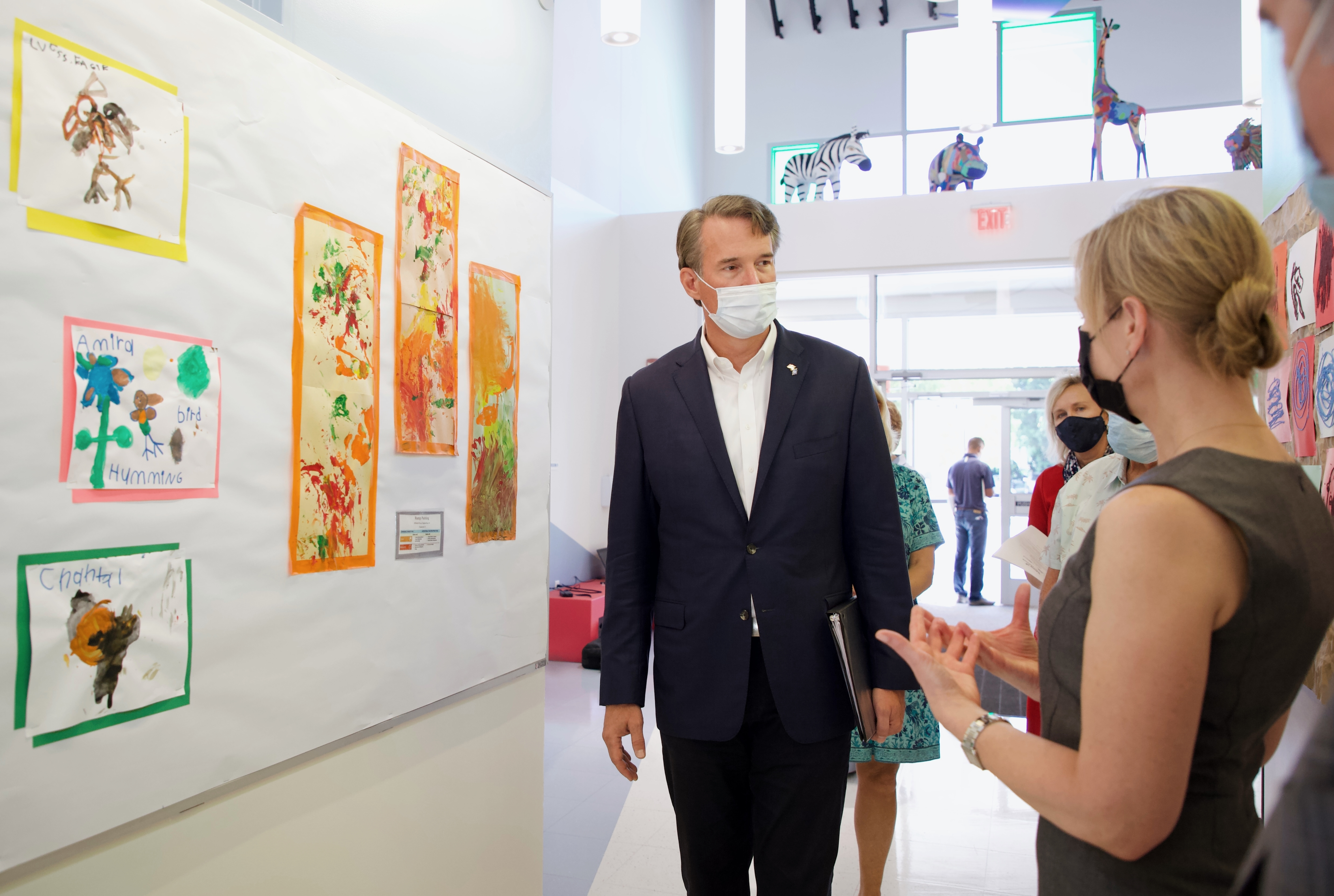
Youngkin on a tour of the New E3 School in Norfolk, Virginia

Youngkin's education platform was identified as the centerpiece of his campaign by much of the national media, and he sought to mobilize voters on the issue by holding Parents Matter rallies. According to Politico, Youngkin "hung his campaign on education". The New York Times wrote that Youngkin's campaign turned Virginia public schools into "a cultural war zone".

=== Cultural issues and curriculum ===
Throughout the campaign, Youngkin spoke against what he characterized as the pervasive teaching of critical race theory in the state. PolitiFact found this characterization of his to be false, saying it found no evidence that critical race theory was part of state curriculum standards and little evidence of it being taught in classrooms. The publication wrote, "Critical race theory is being widely discussed by educators across Virginia. But there's a difference between educators learning about the theory and actually teaching it to students." Critics of Youngkin noted that he sent his own children to private schools where resources promoting critical race theory have been recommended. Youngkin served on the governing board for one of those schools from 2016 until 2019 but has distanced himself from anti-racism initiatives that were adopted by the school.

The Washington Post identified the Loudoun County school system as "ground zero for Youngkin's victory", citing the widespread activism among parents in the county who opposed progressive school policies. Following two sexual assaults that occurred in Loudoun County schools, Youngkin called for campus police to be stationed at every school in Virginia, and after winning the election, he directed the state's Attorney General, Jason Miyares, to investigate the Loudoun County school system's handling of those assaults. Initially, the perpetrator of the assaults was characterized as gender fluid; although this was later denied by the perpetrator's lawyer, conservative media coverage focused on this aspect of the assaults, and the news story fueled opposition to bathroom policies that had been newly adopted in Virginia to accommodate transgender students. Youngkin's Democratic opponent in the election, Terry McAuliffe, said that the assaults were being exploited during the campaign as "a transphobic dog whistle".

A major subject of opposition among Republicans during the campaign was a state law signed in 2020 by Youngkin's predecessor, Ralph Northam, requiring that all Virginia public schools adopt protections for transgender students. Youngkin has been critical of these protections. While running for governor, he supported teachers who refused to refer to their students by preferred pronouns and argued against allowing transgender girls to play on girls' sports teams. As governor, he has stated that he believes public school teachers should be required to out LGBTQ students to their parents. His administration has since announced plans to repeal all of the protections for transgender students that had been introduced under Northam.

Youngkin's first official action as governor was to sign an executive order banning Virginia schools from teaching critical race theory. The order also bans critical race theory from teacher diversity trainings and any other materials produced by the Virginia Department of Education. The Richmond Times-Dispatch reported that the executive order "targets various initiatives...including the EdEquityVa Initiative, a program aimed at promoting cultural competency in classrooms, higher teacher diversity, and decreasing suspension rates for Black students."

This same executive order cancels the Virginia Mathematics Pathways Initiative, a program that had been developed and proposed by the Northam administration in an effort to both close the racial achievement gap and better equip students with modern job skills. According to The Virginian-Pilot, some critics of the program viewed it as "a dumbing down of standards". Youngkin called the program a "left-wing takeover of public education", and many conservatives claimed that it would have eliminated advanced high school math classes – a claim that Youngkin gave prominence to during his campaign. James Lane, Virginia Superintendent at the time, and NPR, both disputed this characterization of the program. The Virginia Math Pathways Initiative would have prioritized data science and data analytics over calculus while still offering students the opportunity to enroll in calculus at an accelerated pace. Although education officials within the Northam administration explored the potential benefits of detracking students prior to the 11th grade, no plans to do so were ever adopted, and in April 2021, those officials explained that the Virginia Math Pathways Initiative was not designed to eliminate advanced math classes at any grade level. Shortly after Youngkin and other conservatives first began speaking out against the Virginia Math Pathways Initiative, The Washington Post reported that the actual nature of the program had been "obscured...[by] prominent Virginians and copious coverage from right-wing news outlets" as "outrage built online" among those opposed to it.

In early April 2022, Youngkin signed a bill allowing school parents throughout Virginia to review and opt their children out of any educational material containing "sexually explicit content"; any opted out student would be provided with alternative material. This is the first statewide law in the nation allowing for parental review of sexually explicit content in school curriculum. Democrats have criticized the bill for taking control over education away from local school systems and have argued that its definition of "sexually explicit content" is "overly broad". The bill passed along mostly party lines. A similar bill, known as the "Beloved Bill", was vetoed by McAuliffe in both 2016 and 2017. That bill, which had originated when a conservative activist took issue with the inclusion of Beloved in her high school senior son's AP English class, became one of the focal points of Virginia's 2021 gubernatorial election, and reviving the bill was identified by The Washington Post as "one of the key promises" of Youngkin's campaign. The provisions of the bill will take effect in 2023.

In May 2022, Youngkin sent a letter to the Council of Presidents overseeing Virginia colleges and universities, urging mandatory political diversity in their hiring practices. That year, he introduced a budget amendment, which succeeded in the General Assembly, requiring that the state's public colleges and universities promote "free speech and diversity of thought on [their] campuses."

In August 2022, Youngkin enlisted the Thomas B. Fordham Institute, a conservative think tank, to assist in revising Virginia's educational standards for history and social sciences.

During the 2022 legislative session, Youngkin advocated for a bill that would have reversed reforms that had been recently adopted to the admissions processes at some Governor's Schools in Virginia, specifically at Thomas Jefferson High School for Science and Technology in Alexandria and at Maggie L. Walker Governor's School for Government and International Studies in Richmond. The reforms that Youngkin wanted to reverse had been adopted to increase racial diversity among the student bodies at those two schools, where Black and Hispanic students had been consistently underrepresented. Although race blind, the reformed admissions processes achieved their goal by implementing an approach largely based on geographic and socioeconomic factors. The bill supported by Youngkin would have banned such an approach, characterizing the use of geographic and socioeconomic factors as "proxy discrimination". This bill passed in the Republican-controlled House of Delegates but failed in the Democratic-controlled State Senate. A separate bill signed by Youngkin that same year bans Governor's Schools in Virginia "from discriminating against any individual or group on the basis of race, sex, color, ethnicity, or national origin in the process of admitting students to such school." This bill, which received bipartisan support, was described by The Richmond Times-Dispatch as "a watered-down version" of Youngkin's preferred bill. According to WRIC-TV, a Virginia ABC News affiliate, it has been argued that the bill signed by Youngkin "has no legal impact because it largely reiterates existing federal law."

=== Tipline for "divisive practices" ===
During his first week as governor, Youngkin set up an email tipline to receive reports about what he characterized as "divisive practices" in Virginia schools. The tipline was announced in a January 21, 2022 news release focused on Youngkin's executive order banning school mask mandates. Three days later, Youngkin discussed the tipline on a conservative radio show, where he said that parents should use the tipline to report "any instances where they feel that their fundamental rights are being violated, where their children are not being respected, where there are inherently divisive practices in their schools." Speaking of the practices to be reported, he said on the radio show that his administration would "catalogue it all" and begin "rooting it out".

The tipline was described by The Washington Post as "part of a broader push by Youngkin to identify and root out what he says are elements of critical race theory in the state’s curriculum." The publication further reported that the tipline was viewed by "a teachers union, Democrats in the General Assembly, some parents and other observers...as divisive, authoritarian and unfairly targeting educators." Virginia Republicans have defended the tipline by comparing it to systems that previous governors of the state had set up for people to report violations of business regulations and health protocols. On January 26, a spokesperson for Youngkin tweeted that critics of the tipline had mischaracterized it and described the tipline as "a customary constituent service."

A week after the tipline debuted, CNN reported that the initiative had drawn national attention. Colin Jost derided the tipline on Saturday Night Live during Weekend Update, and John Legend encouraged opponents of the initiative to co-opt the tipline, tweeting, "Black parents need to flood these tip lines with complaints about our history being silenced. We are parents too." Several media outlets reported that critics of Youngkin were spamming the tipline. Describing it as a "snitch line", political scientist Larry Sabato predicted that the tipline would "backfire" on Youngkin. Near the end of January, WSET reported that the tipline had been criticized by "Virginia teachers and the Virginia Education Association...for targeting teachers who are already struggling amid staffing shortages and other challenges related to the COVID-19 pandemic", while The Lead with Jake Tapper reported that the tipline could cause retention problems among Virginia educators.

On February 3, 2022, Youngkin explained that his administration was "responding" to complaints submitted to the tipline but did not say whether there would be ramifications for teachers mentioned in those complaints. That month, it was reported that multiple inquiries by The Virginian-Pilot about how complaints sent to the tipline would be used by the Youngkin administration had gone unanswered and that FOIA requests to see emails sent to the tipline had been denied by the Youngkin administration, citing the "working papers and correspondence" exemption in Virginia's FOIA law. In April, a group of over a dozen media outlets sued the Youngkin administration for access to the emails. The lawsuit argued that the "working papers and correspondence" exemption did not apply in this instance, because access to the emails had not been restricted solely to Youngkin's office (Youngkin had allowed a conservative think tank to access the emails). In August, a nonprofit watchdog group, American Oversight, and a law firm, Ballard Spahr, joined in bringing a second lawsuit against the Youngkin administration, seeking access to the emails. In November, the first lawsuit concluded with a settlement that granted the media outlets access to 350 of the emails, representing a small portion of the total number. Shortly after the settlement was reached, the Youngkin administration revealed that it had closed down the tipline in September. The Washington Post reported that the administration had "quietly pulled the plug on the tipline...as tips dried up". The second lawsuit is still ongoing.

=== Loudoun County School Board proposal ===
During Virginia's 2022 legislative session, a bill concerning elections for the Loudoun County School Board was amended by Youngkin in an effort that, if successful, would have caused elections to be held a year in advance for seven of the board's nine members. A spokesperson for Youngkin described the amendment as an attempt at "holding [the board] to account" for their handling of two sexual assaults that had occurred in that county's school system a year earlier. Opposing the Loudoun County School Board over a variety of issues had been a major focus of Youngkin's gubernatorial campaign. In response to Youngkin's proposed amendment, Democrats, several political scientists, and the county school board itself charged that Youngkin was attempting to subvert the election results that had placed the board members in office. The Washington Post reported that Youngkin's effort had "stunned many state political observers as an intrusion into local election integrity without modern precedent in Virginia." The publication further wrote at the time that the amendment was one of the "more controversial actions" that Youngkin had taken and led to "one of the harshest partisan eruptions" in the Virginia state legislature since the start of Youngkin's term. Legal scholar A.E. Dick Howard argued that the amendment was likely in violation of Virginia's Constitution, which Howard had helped to write in the 1970s. The proposed amendment passed in the Republican-controlled House of Delegates but was defeated in the Democratic-controlled State Senate.

=== Repeal of protections for transgender students ===
In September 2022, the Youngkin administration announced that it would be repealing protections for transgender students in Virginia schools. These protections had been established through a bipartisan bill signed by Northam in 2020. That bill requires that policies pertaining to transgender students be in compliance throughout all school districts with "model policies" developed by the Virginia Department of Education. Under Northam, these model policies had mandated that students be allowed access to school facilities and nonathletic school programs corresponding with their gender identity; the policies deferred to the Virginia High School League in matters pertaining to transgender student athletes. The policies also mandated that all school staff use the preferred name and pronoun of each student. Under Youngkin, the model policies were revised by the Virginia Department of Education to mandate that student-access to school facilities and programs be determined by biological sex rather than by gender identity; the policy revisions introduced under Youngkin also mandate that legal documentation be provided before school records can reflect a change in a student's name or gender and that a written request by a parent be provided before school staff can refer to a student by that student's preferred name or pronoun; even after such a request has been submitted by a parent, Youngkin's policies do not require school staff to comply with parental preferences when addressing students. It has been suggested that Youngkin's policies may require teachers to out students to their parents, as the policies state that schools cannot "encourage or instruct teachers to conceal material information about a student from the student’s parent, including information related to gender."

The Youngkin administration framed its replacement of the Northam administration's policies as part of a "commitment to preserving parental rights and upholding the dignity and respect of all public school students." The Washington Post noted that Youngkin's actions fit into a national trend among Republicans, writing that "at least 300 pieces of legislation" curtailing the rights of transgender Americans had been introduced throughout the country in 2022, mostly focusing on children. Despite the legal requirement that they do so, most Virginia school districts had failed to adopt the Northam administration's model policies by the time that the Youngkin administration's replacement policies were announced. Other school districts have refused to adopt the Youngkin administration's model policies, expressing the view that these policies are in violation of state law.

Youngkin's actions are expected to face court challenges. Although the 2020 bill signed by Northam did not specify what Virginia's model policies for the treatment of transgender students should be, it stated that the policies should "address common issues regarding transgender students in accordance with evidence-based best practices" and that the policies should protect transgender students from bullying and harassment. Several legal scholars and Democratic politicians have argued that Youngkin's model policies fail to meet these criteria, and as a result, may be in violation of Virginia law. It has been reported that Youngkin's model policies may also be in violation of the Virginia Human Rights Act, which bans schools from discriminating on the basis of gender identity, and that Youngkin's policy mandating that students use restrooms corresponding with their biological sex may be unenforceable due to the 2020 court ruling in G.G. v. Gloucester County School Board, which mandates that students in Virginia be allowed to use restrooms corresponding with their gender identity.

Shortly after the Youngkin administration's policies were announced, several thousand students from over ninety Virginia schools protested the policies by engaging in walkouts. Organizers of the walkouts stated that the Youngkin administration's policies "will only hurt students in a time when students are facing unparalleled mental health challenges, and are a cruel attempt to politicize the existence of LGBTQIA+ students for political gain."

=== Education budget ===
Youngkin and McAuliffe both campaigned on increasing the education budget in Virginia, where teacher salaries had perpetually lagged behind the national average. Shortly before leaving office, outgoing governor Ralph Northam proposed increasing Virginia's biennual education budget from $14.8 billion to $17.2 billion, while McAuliffe's platform called for increasing the state's spending on education by $2 billion annually. The two Democrats sought to focus their proposed spending increases on raising teacher salaries, expanding preschool to disadvantaged children, investing more in both STEM programs and ESL services, ensuring internet access for all students, and closing the state's achievement gaps.

In contrast to McAuliffe, who introduced much of his education platform concurrently with his announcement to run in the Democratic primary, Youngkin did not begin sharing proposals for state spending on education until months after securing the Republican nomination. McAuliffe criticized Youngkin for not releasing budget details until late in the campaign and argued that spending on education in Virginia could be threatened by the extent of Youngkin's tax cut proposals. The Washington Post wrote that Youngkin's education platform was "far lighter on details" than McAuliffe's and that it largely focused on cultural issues over budgetary proposals. Youngkin began offering specific proposals for education spending late in the summer of 2021, only a few months before the election. These proposals included $100 million a year for raising teacher salaries, $200 million for improvements to school infrastructure, and over $1 billion for expanding school choice programs.

Youngkin inherited a record surplus in state revenue from Northam, which was projected to continue growing during the state's then-upcoming budget cycle. As a result of this surplus, Youngkin had the opportunity to sign a biennial state budget in 2022 that committed $19.2 billion to education, a record for the state even when accounting for inflation. This exceeded the $16.95 billion in education spending that Republicans had wanted to include in the biennial budget. Republicans agreed to the higher amount as part of a budget compromise with Democrats. In exchange for getting much of their desired education spending enacted, Democrats agreed to enact several of Youngkin's tax cut proposals.

Incorporated into the budget compromise was an outgoing proposal of Northam's to enact a 10% salary increase for Virginia teachers over two years. Also included in the compromise were one-time $1,000 bonuses for teachers. This plan was chosen over the one preferred by Republicans, which would have paired a more modest 8% salary increase for teachers over two years with 1% bonuses.

School construction and maintenance received $1.25 billion in the 2022 biennial state budget. This exceeds the amount that had been allotted for these needs in Northam's outgoing budget proposals but is a small fraction of the $25 billion that the Virginia Department of Education says it would take to fully replace the state's oldest schools.

The Virginia Preschool Initiative was expanded by the 2022 biennial state budget. This program provides preschool for many low-income children in the state. Prior to 2022, the program only served children aged four or older, and only families earning less than the federal poverty line could qualify. The 2022 state budget that Youngkin signed lowered the age eligibility to include three year olds and raised the income threshold to 300% of the federal poverty line.

=== Teacher shortages ===
In September 2022, Youngkin issued an executive order directing education officials in his administration to combat Virginia's teacher shortages by easing the process of gaining a teaching license in the state. The order aims to fill vacancies by focusing in large part on recruiting retired teachers, people whose teaching licenses have expired, people with out-of-state teaching licenses, college students in teacher training programs, and military veterans seeking to transition into teaching careers. The order also provides additional funding to school districts with the most severe teacher shortages in Virginia and seeks to bolster in-school child care options for teachers.

The Washington Post reported that "Youngkin’s actions to loosen standards regarding who can become a teacher mirror efforts in other states, including Florida and Arizona, as the nation faces a catastrophic teacher shortage." According to the same publication, some educator groups in Virginia have criticized aspects of Youngkin's executive order, arguing that it could "allow unqualified individuals to teach children", while education policy experts have argued that teacher shortages have been exacerbated in Virginia by education-related culture war issues that Youngkin has escalated during his governorship.

=== Charter schools and lab schools ===
While running for governor, Youngkin voiced support for expanding charter schools in the state and set a goal of adding at least twenty during his term. After the election, The Richmond-Times Dispatch reported that Youngkin's actual goal for charter schools would be to increase the number in Virginia "to match North Carolina, which has more than 200." Only seven charter schools currently exist in Virginia, one of the lowest amounts in the country, and Youngkin has backed proposed legislation that would shift the authority to approve new charter schools from local school boards to newly created "regional charter school divisions". These divisions would have nine voting members, eight appointed by the Virginia State Board of Education, and one appointed by local school boards within the region.

The state budget that Youngkin signed for 2022 includes $100 million for re-establishing lab schools in Virginia. These K-12 public schools, which are separate from charter schools, had previously existed in the state and had continued to be allowed under Virginia law before Youngkin came into office, but none remained operating in the state by the start of Youngkin's term. Previous lab schools in Virginia had been established as partnerships with institutions of higher learning; only public colleges and universities with teacher training programs were allowed to enter into these partnerships. An amendment that Youngkin introduced to the 2022 state budget removed the requirement that all lab schools in the state act as teacher training programs. It also opened lab school partnerships to be formed with community colleges or certain private universities. Lieutenant Governor Winsome Sears had to break a tie vote in the State Senate for this budget amendment to be approved by the General Assembly. Youngkin has additionally advocated for allowing private businesses to enter into lab school partnerships. He has said that lab schools could be either newly established or converted out of existing schools and has supported legislation that would direct the Virginia State Board of Education to "give substantial preference" to lab school applications filed by historically black colleges or universities. Under that legislation, the same preference would be given to applications seeking to establish lab schools in "underserved communities".

Youngkin supports revising how Virginia public schools are funded, so that per pupil funding for any students attending lab schools in the state would go to the institutions operating the schools attended by those students instead of going to the public school boards for the districts where those students reside. An amendment proposed by Youngkin for the 2022 state budget would have enacted this plan but was not adopted by the General Assembly. Although the Virginia Education Association and the editorial board of The Free Lance–Star have both supported Youngkin's goal of re-establishing lab schools in Virginia, they have also both criticized Youngkin's plan for redirecting per pupil funding away from local school boards, noting that because Virginia law allows lab schools to enroll students from anywhere in the state, the plan could lead to decreased funding for certain school districts.

=== College athletics ===
In 2022, Youngkin signed legislation allowing college athletes in Virginia to profit through name, image, and likeness deals. This permanently codified a policy that had already been enacted on a temporary basis a year earlier when Northam was in office. The policy had been temporary under Northam because it had been enacted through the state budget. As had been the case when enacted by Northam, the policy as enacted by Youngkin does not allow college athletes to sponsor or endorse alcohol, tobacco, marijuana, drugs, weapons, casinos, or adult entertainment. The policy allows student athletes to hire agents and ensures that scholarships cannot be lost as a result of earning compensation through a name, image, and likeness deal.

=== School safety ===
In April 2022, Youngkin signed House Bill 741 into law mandating all public schools in Virginia to create detailed digital floor plans of their buildings. The law also provides $6.5 million to schools to create these floor plans.

In May 2022, Youngkin signed a bipartisan bill requiring that principals report to law enforcement certain misdemeanor crimes committed by students on school grounds. This restores a law that had existed before the Northam administration. In 2020, Northam had signed a bill giving principals discretion over whether to report misdemeanor crimes to law enforcement. Northam's policy, which had still required the reporting of felonies, had been adopted in an effort to combat the school-to-prison pipeline. Data from before Northam's policy had been adopted showed that more students in Virginia were reported to law enforcement than in any other state.

In June 2022, shortly after the Robb Elementary School shooting in Uvalde, Texas, Youngkin stressed his support for placing school resource officers in every school in Virginia.

Another bill signed by Youngkin in 2022 requires that all members of student organizations at colleges or universities in Virginia receive training to prevent hazing. The bill, which was adopted with near unanimous support in the state legislature, also requires chapter advisors to undergo such training, requires that all hazing violations be publicly disclosed, and provides immunity to bystanders who report hazing violations.

== Environment ==
Asked if he accepts the scientific consensus on the causes of climate change, Youngkin said he does not know what causes climate change and that he considers the cause to be irrelevant. He supports climate change adaptation efforts such as building additional seawalls. While running for governor, Youngkin said he would not have signed Virginia's Clean Economy Act (which calls for Virginia's carbon emissions to reach net zero by 2050) because he believes it would increase utility prices. Youngkin is in favor of what he calls an "all of the above approach" to energy, saying that he supports both renewable energy sources and natural gas. He has called for Virginia to become a world leader in nuclear energy, proposing that a small modular reactor be built in Southwest Virginia within the next decade.

After winning the election, Youngkin said that he would use an executive action to withdraw Virginia from the Regional Greenhouse Gas Initiative, a regional carbon cap-and-trade market. Youngkin has called the initiative a "carbon tax" and has stated that leaving the initiative would save ratepayers an average of about $50 a year. Democrats have countered that leaving the initiative would cut off a source of revenue for the state that raises hundreds of millions of dollars a year; this revenue is used for flood control and to provide low income ratepayers with energy assistance. On his first day in office, Youngkin signed an executive order calling for a reevaluation of Virginia's membership in the initiative. The Washington Post noted that because Virginia entered the initiative through legislative action, Youngkin may lack the legal authority to withdraw from the initiative without legislative approval. The publication theorized that this legal limitation may have been why Youngkin ultimately ordered a reevaluation of the initiative rather than a withdrawal. In August 2022, the Youngkin administration announced that, despite the likely legal challenges, it would attempt to withdraw Virginia from the initiative by the end of 2023 without seeking legislative approval to do so. Around that same time, Youngkin announced his desire to block a law set to take effect in 2024, which would require that Virginia follow California's vehicle emissions standards.

In his 2022 address to the General Assembly, Youngkin called for the state to better protect against pollution of the James River, voiced support for ongoing efforts to clean the Chesapeake Bay, and proposed that the state establish a Coastal Virginia Resiliency Authority to combat rising sea levels. Later that year, Youngkin opposed the scope of a bill that had been designed to improve Virginia's flood preparedness. According to The Washington Post, Youngkin attempted to "gut" the bill by amending it but was overruled by a unanimous vote by the State Senate.

In April 2022, Youngkin issued an executive order that rescinded former governor Ralph Northam's order to ban single-use plastics at executive branch state agencies. Although the replacement order issued by Youngkin also directed state agencies to develop a plan for increasing recycling in Virginia and reducing food waste by companies in the state, environmental groups criticized the order, claiming that recycling alone without measures to curb the sale of single-use plastic is "a clear step in the wrong direction that will result in irreversible damage."

Additional action taken by Youngkin in April 2022 included signing legislation that revised the state's permit-issuing process for controversial projects with environmental impacts. This revision transferred authority to issue such permits away from two citizen review boards and to the Department of Environmental Quality, which oversees those boards. Virginia's two review boards impacted by the legislation were the Water Control Board and the Air Pollution Control Board. According to VPM, a Virginia NPR affiliate, before Youngkin's legislation, these two review boards were "only responsible" for permitting decisions when projects were "considered to be controversial". That same publication noted that the review boards almost always based their permitting decisions on recommendations made by the Department of Environmental Quality.

Only a few months before the permitting process was changed under Youngkin, the state Air Pollution Control Board had made the decision to deny a permit for a compressor station that would have been part of the Mountain Valley Pipeline. The Air Pollution Control Board made this decision even though the Department of Environmental Quality had recommended approval for the compressor station, and this marked one of only four instances in the preceding twenty years that any citizen review board in Virginia had decided against issuing a permit recommended for approval by that department. The Richmond-Times Dispatch reported that in making this decision, the Air Pollution Control Board was "angering business groups". VPM reported that the decision was cited by Republicans as a reason for transferring permitting authority away from citizen review boards. Although Youngkin's legislation revising the permitting process gained some bipartisan support in the state legislature, it was opposed by environmental groups.

== Health care ==
During Virginia's 2022 legislative session, Youngkin vetoed bills that would have set a three-year statute of limitations on the collection of medical debt and prohibited health insurance companies from charging higher premiums for tobacco use. Both bills had passed the state legislature with broad bipartisan support. Youngkin explained his veto of the latter bill by claiming that such a policy would have caused higher costs for consumers. According to The Washington Post, this claim conflicted with national studies showing that the policy would have decreased costs for consumers. The publication also noted that Youngkin's veto of that bill was in opposition to "the unanimous recommendation of a bipartisan study commission".

== Immigration ==
An amendment that Youngkin introduced to the 2022 state budget took $10 million over two years that had been planned as financial aid for undocumented immigrants pursuing higher education in Virginia and used the money instead to increase financial aid for students attending Virginia's historically black colleges and universities. The amendment was passed by the General Assembly along mostly party lines. According to The Washington Post, half of the money reallocated by the amendment will be "used to supplement in-state student aid at Norfolk State and Virginia State universities, which are both public institutions" and the other half will be used to "increase Virginia Tuition Assistance Grants, a form of aid for residents attending private colleges and universities, to $7,500 from $5,000 a year for students enrolled in historically Black institutions." Lamont Bagby, chair of the Virginia Legislative Black Caucus, condemned the amendment, calling it the wrong way to help HBCUs. Several Democrats characterized the amendment as an effort to "pit" two different disadvantaged student groups against each other. The Richmond Times-Dispatch noted that Youngkin could have drawn from "up to $50 million in unappropriated money" in state revenue to assist Virginia's HBCUs, rather than taking money that had been initially allocated to assist undocumented immigrant students.

== LGBTQ rights ==
Youngkin personally opposes same-sex marriage, but has said he would not interfere with the issue as governor. In an interview with the Associated Press, he said that he considers same-sex marriage "legally acceptable" and that "as governor, [he] would support [legal same-sex marriage]." He has maintained the governor's LGBTQ+ Advisory Board but has been criticized by members of that board for what they have described as his lack of meaningful support for the LGBTQ+ community.

In June 2022, Youngkin expressed some support for LGBTQ+ Pride Month; he hosted "a private Pride reception at the Capitol" but did not invite any of Virginia's openly LGBTQ+ state legislators to the event, which was boycotted by all but one member of the LGBTQ+ Advisory Board and by other LGBTQ+ groups. Those who boycotted the event did so because they saw it as inconsistent with Youngkin's policy stances, which they considered to be in opposition to the LGBTQ+ community. That same month, Youngkin hosted the Log Cabin Republicans, an LGBTQ+ Republican group, at the Governor's Mansion. Youngkin rejected a request from the LGBTQ+ Advisory Board to issue a proclamation recognizing Pride Month. His decision to hold a Pride event has been condemned by the socially conservative Family Foundation of Virginia, which wrote that Youngkin's choice to celebrate Pride Month "dismays many people of faith".

In July 2022, shortly after the United States Supreme Court overturned Roe v. Wade, Youngkin was asked how Virginia would respond if that court were to overturn Obergefell v. Hodges, the case that legalized same-sex marriage nationwide in the United States. Youngkin responded by stating, "I can't live in the world of hypotheticals." The Virginia Constitution includes an amendment banning same-sex marriage, which, according to Washington Post, "would become operative again if the Supreme Court were to reverse itself." An effort to repeal that amendment was defeated by Republicans during Youngkin's first year in office.

== Marijuana ==
A few months after his inauguration, Youngkin proposed that Virginia recriminalize possessing more than two ounces (57 g) of marijuana. When the Northam administration, a year earlier, had legalized possessing up to one ounce (28 g) of marijuana in Virginia, it did so while establishing a system in which possessing between one ounce (28 g) and one pound (450 g) was made punishable by a $25 fine; possessing over one pound remained a felony. This system made Virginia the only US state to have legalized marijuana possession without having misdemeanor penalties for possessing over the legal amount. Youngkin's proposal to introduce such penalties in Virginia was inspired by a recommendation made in 2021 by the state legislature's nonpartisan Joint Legislative Audit and Review Commission.

Under Youngkin's proposal, possessing more than two ounces of marijuana would become a Class 2 misdemeanor, while possessing more than six ounces (170 g) would become a Class 1 misdemeanor. Before this proposal was made, the Democratic-controlled State Senate had passed a bill during the 2022 legislative session that would have made possessing more than four ounces (110 g) of marijuana a Class 3 misdemeanor. That bill, which also would have legalized the sale of recreational marijuana in Virginia, was rejected by the Republican-controlled House of Delegates. Later that year, as part of a bipartisan budget deal signed by Youngkin, Virginia made possessing between four ounces (110 g) and one pound (450 g) of marijuana in public a Class 3 misdemeanor for a first time offense and a Class 2 misdemeanor for repeat offenses. This same budget deal banned the sale of cannabis products shaped as animals, humans, vehicles, or fruits, so as to protect against accidental consumption by children.

Separate marijuana legislation signed by Youngkin in 2022 allows patients to purchase medical marijuana immediately upon receiving a certificate to do so from a registered medical provider. Previously, patients were required to register with the State Board of Pharmacy before they could make such a purchase. This reform was enacted due to long wait times occurring during the registration process.

Youngkin had also proposed raising the legal age for purchasing CBD products in Virginia to 21 and banning products that contain Delta-8 THC, which is described by The Washington Post as "a hemp-derived compound that has become popular for its similarity to Delta-9, the main compound in marijuana that gives consumers a high.

== Voting rights ==
As governor, Youngkin had continued the work of restoring voting rights to former felons, an effort that began under Governor Bob McDonnell and then intensified under McDonnell's immediate successors, McAuliffe and Northam. Virginia is one of only eleven states that does not automatically allow former felons to vote by the end of their sentences. An amendment to the state constitution that would have established automatic voting rights restoration for released felons in Virginia passed the legislature during Northam's final year in office, but amendments to the state constitution must be passed during two consecutive legislative sessions before they can be voted on by the public in a referendum, and Republicans in the House of Delegates voted against the amendment during Youngkin's first year in office.

In 2022, Youngkin signed bipartisan legislation requiring that the removal of deceased voters from Virginia's electoral rolls be conducted on a weekly basis; this had previously been done on a monthly basis. That same year, Youngkin signed legislation changing how absentee ballots are reported in Virginia. Previously, these ballots had been reported as part of a single, at-large precinct. Youngkin's legislation requires that they instead be reported precinct-by-precinct.

In May 2023, the administration withdrew from the Electronic Registration Information Center, an organization aimed at improving voter roll accuracy. The administration removed 3,400 eligible voters from the state's voter rolls ahead of the 2023 Virginia elections after probation violations were misclassified as felonies.

In August 2024, Youngkin signed an executive order removing 6,303 voters suspected of being non-citizens from Virginia's voter rolls. In October 2024, the Department of Justice sued the Virginia Board of Elections and Virginia commissioner of elections over the voter purge, accusing that it violated the National Voter Registration Act, which prevents states from removing voters from voter rolls within 90 days of federal elections. The suit also found a number of alleged non-citizens purged were actually citizens. District judge Patricia Tolliver Giles ruled that the removal was illegal, ordering the state to stop purging voter rolls and to restore the voter registration of more than 1,600 voters who had been removed. The 4th Circuit Court of Appeals then upheld the order. The administration filed an emergency appeal to the Supreme Court, which sided with Virginia in a 6–3 decision, allowing the state to continue purging voter rolls.

== Involvement in the 2022 federal midterms ==
During the 2022 federal elections, Youngkin campaigned frequently for Republicans in other states, supporting both candidates who had embraced Donald Trump's false claims about the 2020 election and those who had not. This led to The Washington Post writing that Youngkin had "demonstrated uncommon flexibility on an issue that for others...represents a bright line." Youngkin's refusal to distance himself from conspiracy theorists within his own party has elicited criticism from some moderate Republicans, such as Liz Cheney, David Jolly, and Bill Kristol.

Among the candidates Youngkin campaigned for during the midterms was former Maine governor Paul LePage, who was seeking a nonconsecutive third term in office. During his previous tenure as governor, LePage had drawn controversy for a series of comments that both Republican and Democratic politicians condemned as racist; these comments included LePage stating that "the enemy right now...are people of color or people of Hispanic origin." Youngkin initially claimed to be unaware of these comments. He later condemned the comments but defended his choice to campaign for LePage, claiming that LePage had apologized. As reported by The Washington Post, LePage had not actually apologized for most of the comments.

Hours after it was reported that Nancy Pelosi's husband, Paul Pelosi, was the victim of a politically motivated assault that left him with a fractured skull, Youngkin appeared at a campaign appearance in support of a Republican congressional candidate running in the 2022 federal midterms, where he stated, "Speaker Pelosi’s husband – they had a break-in last night in their house, and he was assaulted. There’s no room for violence anywhere, but we’re gonna send her back to be with him in California. That’s what we’re gonna go do." Virginia Democrats condemned Youngkin for choosing to speak against the Pelosis so soon after the attack. When asked if he wanted to apologize for the comment, Youngkin chose not to do so but stated, "a terrible thing happened to the speaker’s husband and it should never have happened and we wish him a speedy recovery. The first lady and I keep him in our prayers." Time magazine wrote that Youngkin and other Republicans who used the assault to engage in criticism of the Pelosis had "highlighted the devolved state of American political discourse", while Don Scott, the Democratic leader in Virginia's House of Delegates, stated that Youngkin's response to the assault was part of a long trend in which he felt that "Youngkin's espoused Christian values didn't match his actions". A few days after his initial comment, Youngkin stated that he "didn't do a great job" of condemning the attack and apologized for his rhetoric in a handwritten letter to Nancy Pelosi.

== Approval ratings ==
The following are polls of Glenn Youngkin's approval rating among Virginians.

Poll source	Date(s) administered	Sample size (Note: Key: A – all adults RV – registered voters LV – likely voters V – unclear)	Margin of error	Percent who Approve of Youngkin	Percent who Disapprove of Youngkin	Net approval	Percent Undecided
Wason Center	January 26 – February 15, 2022	701 (RV)	± 4.2%	41%	43%	-2	16%
Roanoke College	August 7-August 16, 2022	640 (A)	± 4.5%	55%	35%	+20	10%
Roanoke College	November 13–22, 2022	652 (A)	± 4.48%	52%	41%	+11	7%
Wason Center	January 13- January 23, 2023	1038 (RV)	± 3.8%	50%	36%	+14	14%
Roanoke College	February 12–21, 2023	680 (A)	± 4.23%	57%	35%	+22	8%
Roanoke College	August 12–16, 2024	691 (LV)	± 4.5%	59%	32%	+26	9%
Virginia Commonwealth University	December 18, 2024 – January 15, 2025	806 (A)	± 4.75%	51%	38%	+13	11%
