= American Accountability Foundation =

American conservative opposition research group

- Abbreviation: AAF
- Formation: 2020
- Tax ID no.: 85-4391204
- Headquarters: Washington, D.C., U.S.
- Executive director: Tom Jones
- Website: americanaccountabilityfoundation.com

The American Accountability Foundation (AAF) is an American conservative opposition research group founded in 2020 that opposed nominees to the Joe Biden administration. In the second Trump administration, it maintained lists of civil servants whom it accused of "subversion".

== History ==
=== Creation and funding ===
The AAF was launched in December 2020. In its first year, it received $335,100 from the Conservative Partnership Institute (CPI), led by former Trump chief of staff Mark Meadows and former Heritage Foundation president and Republican senator Jim DeMint. This constituted over half of its funding. The next year, the CPI provided a further $210,000; Russell Vought's Center for Renewing America (CRA) provided $100,000; and Stephen Miller's America First Legal Foundation (AFL) provided $25,000.

The AAF's executive director and co-founder, Tom Jones, previously worked for Republican senators Ron Johnson, Ted Cruz (directing opposition research for Cruz's 2016 presidential campaign), Jim DeMint, and John Ensign. Its other co-founder, Matthew Buckham, worked in the White House Presidential Personnel Office during the first Trump presidency.

At its founding the AAF was directly controlled by Miller's AFL and Vought's CRA. By February 2025, the AAF's president, Tom Jones, said the AAF was an independent organization.

In 2022, the AAF described itself as a "charitable and educational organization that conducts non-partisan governmental oversight research and fact-checking so Americans can hold their elected leaders accountable". Jones told Fox News in April 2021 that he aimed to "take a big handful of sand and throw it in the gears of the Biden administration".

According to Reuters:

In June 2022, as Trump prepared to run [for President], the Heritage Foundation named AAF a partner in Project 2025 ... Two years later, Heritage awarded AAF $100,000 to launch "Project Sovereignty 2025," a database of federal employees involved in Biden-era immigration policy.

Other sources of funding include the 85 Fund, associated with Leonard Leo, and private foundations such as the Dunn Foundation, the W.L. Amos Sr. Foundation, the Nord Family Foundation, and the Quinn Family Foundation. "Dark money" obscuring the donors has been contributed to AAF via donor-advised funds including the Goldman Sachs Charitable Fund, the Fidelity Investments Charitable Gift Fund, and the National Christian Charitable Fund.

In 2022, The New Yorker described the AAF as a "dark money group."

=== Political campaigns ===
The New Yorker said in April 2022 that the AAF "aims to thwart the entire Biden slate", and had targeted 29 nominees. The AAF acknowledged its role in derailing Biden's nominations of David Chipman to be director of the Bureau of Alcohol, Tobacco, Firearms and Explosives in 2021; Sarah Bloom Raskin to be vice-chair for supervision of the Federal Reserve Board in 2022; and David Weil for the Wage and Hour Division of the Department of Labor. The AAF's research was used by Republican opponents of the nomination of Ketanji Brown Jackson for the U.S. Supreme Court in 2022.

In September 2021, the AAF filed an ethics complaint against representative Alexandria Ocasio-Cortez for attending the Met Gala. The AAF claimed that her attendance amounted to accepting an illegal gift since her estimated $35,000 ticket was paid for by Conde Nast, a for-profit company, not a charity. The event itself is a charitable fundraiser.

In 2023, during Gigi Sohn's nomination to the Federal Communications Commission (FCC) she faced an aggressive campaign funded by the American Accountability Foundation (AAF). Sohn, a consumer advocate nominated by President Joe Biden, aimed to expand free internet access and improve broadband competition. The AAF, not required to disclose its donors, launched an attack on Sohn, labeling her as too partisan, anti-police, and soft on sex trafficking. Despite being a historic nominee as the FCC's first openly LGBTQ+ commissioner, Sohn faced opposition from moderate Democrats, leading to her withdrawal from the race. This instance showcased how dark money and untraceable donations influenced public opinion and nominee confirmations, shaping the political landscape. Telecom industry lobbyists were reportedly involved behind the scenes to thwart Sohn's nomination, emphasizing the power of such groups in American politics.

=== Websites targeting individual federal employees ===
In 2024, AAF published a website targeting nonpartisan federal civil servants working at the Department of Homeland Security, the Department of Justice, and the Office of Management and Budget. The website, "DHS Bureaucrat Watch List", targets employees who it describes as the "most subversive immigration bureaucrats." The website publishes career civil servants' personal information, including names, titles, photographs, small-dollar political donations, and screenshots of employees' personal social media accounts.

The organization received $100,000 from The Heritage Foundation to complete the project. A federal employee union compared the effort to McCarthyism and said it aimed to intimidate and frighten federal employees. A columnist for The Washington Post noted that career civil servants swear an oath to the Constitution and carry out the policies of the elected administration regardless of party.

In February 2025, AAF published a second website, "DEI Watch List", which expanded its targeting of federal civil servants to health agencies, such as the Centers for Disease Control and Prevention and the Food and Drug Administration. The website lists mostly Black people. The DEI Watch List targets employees primarily based on their personal political affiliation. The AAF said that it identified individuals based on their campaign donations to Democrats and social media posts, and that it did not attempt to verify the information. Many of the people on the list had worked on programs for improving health outcomes for rural and low-income communities, as well as for people of color. The director of the American Public Health Association said that the list seems to intend to threaten and scare employees.

Civil servants named on the lists have faced harassment, threats, destruction of property, and firing without cause by the Trump administration. By omitting details such as home addresses, the lists fall short of illegal violations of privacy. However, they, according to legal experts, have nevertheless had the effect of creating a chilling effect on the public service by deterring public servants from engaging in politically sensitive work. The AAF provides a portal for civil servants to ask for removal from its lists in exchange for providing evidence of being fired or resigning.
