= L&I =

L&I may refer to:

== Government ==
- Pennsylvania Department of Labor and Industry
- Washington State Department of Labor and Industries

== Transportation ==
- Lafayette & Indianapolis Railroad, a predecessor company of the Central Railroad of Indiana
- Louisville and Interurban Railroad, a defunct railroad in the US state of Kentucky

== See also ==
- Maryland Department of Labor, previously the Maryland Department of Labor and Industry
- Minnesota Department of Labor and Industry (DLI)
- Oregon Bureau of Labor and Industries (BOLI)
- Virginia Department of Labor and Industry (DOLI)
- Ministry of Labour
