= David Weil =

David Weil may refer to:

- David Weil (government official), United States Department of Labor official
- David N. Weil (born 1961), professor of economics at Brown University
- David Weil (filmmaker) (born 1989/1990), American television writer, producer, director and showrunner
