= Jessica Looman =

American government official

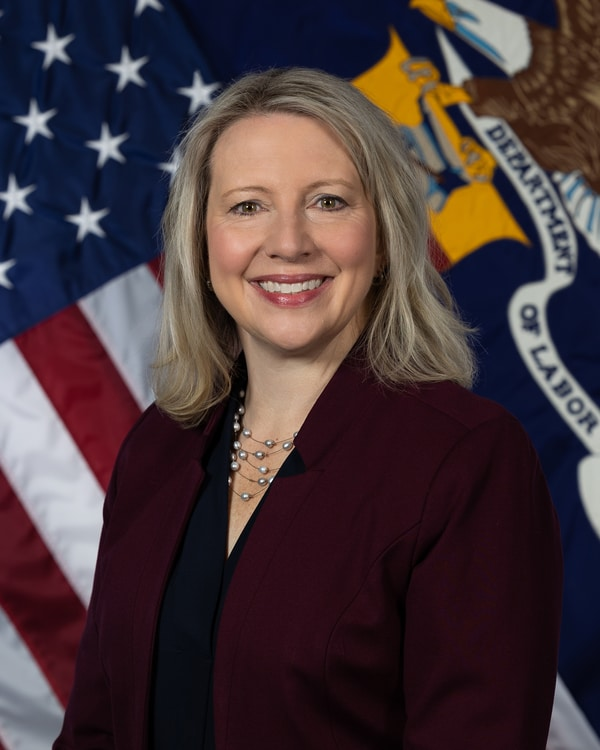
- Looman in 2021

3rd Virginia Secretary of Labor
- Incumbent
- Assumed office January 17, 2026
- Governor: Abigail Spanberger
- Preceded by: G. Bryan Slater

Administrator of the Wage and Hour Division
- In office January 20, 2021 – January 20, 2025; Acting: January 20, 2021 – October 26, 2023
- President: Joe Biden
- Preceded by: Cheryl Stanton
- Succeeded by: Andrew Rogers

Commissioner of the Minnesota Department of Commerce
- In office November 2017 – January 2019
- Governor: Mark Dayton
- Preceded by: Mike Rothman
- Succeeded by: Steve Kelley

Personal details
- Party: Democratic
- Education: George Washington University (BA); University of Minnesota (JD)

Jessica Looman is an American attorney and government official serving as the Virginia Secretary of Labor under Governor Abigail Spanberger since 2026. She served as the administrator of the U.S. Department of Labor Wage and Hour Division from 2021 to 2025.

== Early life and education ==
Looman is from Saint Paul, Minnesota. Looman earned a Bachelor of Art degree in politics and government from George Washington University and a Juris Doctor from the University of Minnesota Law School.

== Career ==
From 2001 to 2011, Looman worked as the general counsel for the Laborers District Council of Minnesota and North Dakota. Looman joined the Minnesota Department of Labor and Industry in 2011, serving as assistant commissioner until 2014 and deputy commissioner from 2014 to 2017.

From November 2017 to January 2019, she served as commissioner of the Minnesota Department of Commerce under Governor Mark Dayton. Looman succeeded Mike Rothman, who resigned to run for Minnesota Attorney General in the 2018 election. She ultimately left the position in 2019, and was succeeded by Steve Kelley. She worked as the executive director of the Minnesota State Building and Construction Trades Council from 2019 to 2021.

She joined the United States Department of Labor in 2021 as the principal deputy administrator of the Wage and Hour Division (WHD). After David Weil's nomination for administrator was defeated, President Biden nominated Looman instead to the position; she was confirmed by the Senate in October 2023.

After leaving the Department of Labor in 2025, she became a senior fellow at the New York University (NYU)'s Wagner Graduate School of Public Service Labor Initiative. Following Abigail Spanberger's victory in the 2025 Virginia gubernatorial election, Looman was selected to serve as Secretary of Labor of Virginia.
