= Dabney S. Lancaster =

American educator and government official (1889–1975)

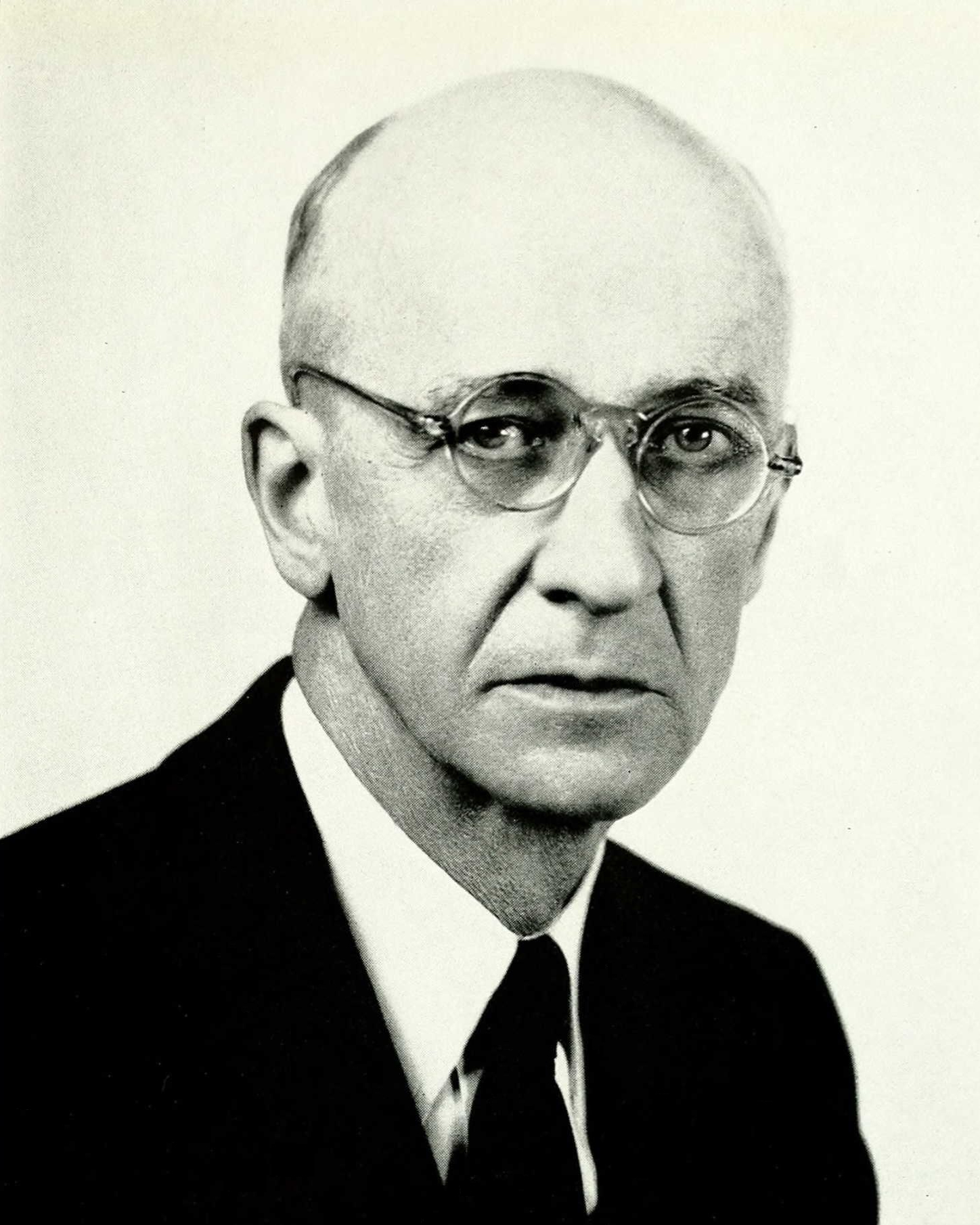
- Portrait of Lancaster, c. 1955

1st Chair of the State Council of Higher Education for Virginia
- In office August 21, 1956 – June 30, 1964
- Governor: Thomas B. Stanley; J. Lindsay Almond; Albertis Harrison
- Preceded by: Office established
- Succeeded by: Sol W. Rawls Jr.

17th President of Longwood University
- In office July 1, 1946 – July 1, 1955
- Preceded by: Joseph L. Jarman
- Succeeded by: Francis Lankford Jr.

10th Virginia Superintendent of Public Instruction
- In office September 1, 1941 – June 15, 1946
- Governor: James H. Price; Colgate Darden
- Preceded by: Sidney B. Hall
- Succeeded by: G. Tyler Miller

Personal details
- Born: Dabney Stewart Lancaster; October 12, 1889 Richmond, Virginia, U.S.
- Died: March 11, 1975 (aged 85) Lexington, Virginia, U.S.
- Resting place: Hollywood Cemetery
- Spouse: Mary Tabb Crump
- Children: 4
- Education: University of Virginia (BA); Virginia Tech (MS)

Dabney Stewart Lancaster (October 12, 1889 – March 11, 1975) was an American educator and government official.

== Early life & education ==
A native of Richmond, Virginia, Lacaster was educated at the Episcopal High School in Alexandria, Virginia. He attended the University of Virginia and Virginia Tech.

== Career ==
Lanacaster went on to serve as Virginia Superintendent of Public Instruction from 1941 to 1946, as the president of Longwood College (now Longwood University) from 1946 to 1955, and as the first head of the State Council of Higher Education for Virginia. In 1967, the state honored him by naming its new community college in Clifton Forge after him.

While Lancaster was previously described as a moderate on racial issues, relative to his contemporaries, advocating for equal pay for white and black teachers, his support of race-based segregation in public schools during his career and the discovery of his involvement with the Anglo-Saxon Clubs of America, a white supremacist organization, prompted state officials to change the name of Dabney S. Lancaster Community College to Mountain Gateway Community College, effective 2022, in the wake of the George Floyd protests.

== Death ==
He died in Lexington on March 11, 1975. He was buried in Hollywood Cemetery in Richmond.

Government offices
Preceded by Sidney B. Hall	Virginia Superintendent of Public Instruction; 1941–1946	Succeeded by G. Tyler Miller
Office established	Chair of the State Council of Higher Education for Virginia; 1956–1964	Succeeded by Sol W. Rawls Jr.
Academic offices
Preceded by Joseph L. Jarman	President of Longwood College; 1946–1955	Succeeded by Francis Lankford Jr.
