= Cheryl Stanton =

American lawyer

Cheryl Marie Stanton
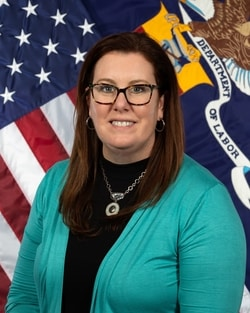

Administrator of the Wage and Hour Division at the United States Department of Labor
- In office April 29, 2019 – January 20, 2021
- President: Donald Trump
- Preceded by: Keith Sonderling (acting)
- Succeeded by: Jessica Looman

Personal details
- Education: Williams College; University of Chicago Law School
- Awards: Order of the Palmetto

Cheryl Marie Stanton is an American lawyer and former government official. She was the Administrator of the Wage and Hour Division at the United States Department of Labor under the first Trump Administration. She previously served as the Executive Director of the South Carolina Department of Employment and Workforce.

== Career ==
Stanton is a graduate of Williams College, and earned her J.D. from the University of Chicago Law School, graduating in 1997. During this time she was a clerk for Samuel Alito on the United States Court of Appeals for the Third Circuit.

Early in her career, Stanton worked as a labor and employment attorney in both the public and private sectors. She served as associate White House counsel for President George W. Bush, acting as the administration's principal liaison to the U.S. Department of Labor, National Labor Relations Board, and the Equal Employment Opportunity Commission.

=== South Carolina Department of Employment and Workforce ===
In 2013, Stanton was appointed as the Executive Director of the South Carolina Department of Employment and Workforce by governor Nikki Haley. While there, Stanton collaborated with the South Carolina Department of Commerce, the South Carolina Technical College System, and the South Carolina Department of Education to create the South Carolina Talent Pipeline project, which aims to create a consistent supply of qualified candidates for state jobs. She also partnered with the South Carolina Department of Corrections to establish the Second Chance program, which helps inmates who are preparing to be released from prison to search for work and secure jobs after incarceration.

In 2016, Nikki Haley awarded Stanton the Order of the Palmetto, which is the highest civilian honor awarded by the Governor of South Carolina.

On November 26, 2018, South Carolina governor Henry McMaster announced the resignation of Cheryl Stanton from her position at the Department of Employment and Workforce.

=== United States Department of Labor ===
Stanton was confirmed by the Senate for the position of Administrator of the Wage and Hour Division for the United States Department of Labor on April 10, 2019.
