= Jillian Balow =

American politician (born 1970)

- Balow in 2022

Virginia Superintendent of Public Instruction
- In office January 16, 2022 – March 9, 2023
- Governor: Glenn Youngkin
- Preceded by: James Lane
- Succeeded by: Lisa Coons

Wyoming Superintendent of Public Instruction
- In office January 5, 2015 – January 16, 2022
- Governor: Matt Mead; Mark Gordon
- Preceded by: Cindy Hill
- Succeeded by: Brian Schroeder (acting)

Personal details
- Born: 1970 (age 55–56) Laramie, Wyoming, U.S.
- Party: Republican
- Education: University of Wyoming (BA); Regis University (MEd)

Jillian Balow (born 1970) is an American politician who was appointed as the Virginia superintendent of public instruction in January 2022. She resigned from the position in March 2023. From 2014 to January 2022, she was the Wyoming superintendent of public instruction.

== Career ==
Balow was a division administrator in the Wyoming Department of Family Services.

Balow was president of the Council of Chief State School Officers. A Republican, she was elected as the Wyoming Superintendent of Public Instruction in 2014, winning 61% of the vote against Democrat Mike Ceballos. During her 2014 campaign, she opposed the Common Core initiatives. Balow ran unopposed in 2018. Her last day as the Wyoming superintendent was January 16, 2022. She was succeeded in the position by Brian Schroeder.

In January 2022, Balow was appointed by governor Glenn Youngkin as the Virginia superintendent of public instruction. She succeeded acting Virginia superintendent Rosa Atkins.

On March 1, 2023, Balow announced her resignation as Virginia's Superintendent of Public Instruction, effective March 9. Balow's tenure at VDOE was marked with high-profile fights over issues including revised state standards for history education and the treatment of transgender students in schools.

In January 2026, Balow announced that she would run for the U.S. House of Representatives in Wyoming's at-large congressional district as a Republican, seeking to succeed Harriet Hageman, who is running for U.S. Senate.

== Bibliography ==
- Eavis, Victoria (January 14, 2022). "Balow resigns for Virginia job". Casper Star-Tribune. pp. A1 – via newspapers.com.
- Graff, Trevor (November 2, 2014). "Candidates seek to unify education community". Casper Star-Tribune. p. 65 – via newspapers.com.
- "Youngkin names Wyoming schools leader as Virginia's next superintendent". The Virginian-Pilot. January 14, 2022.
- Beck, Bob (July 15, 2022). "Schroeder hopes to guide Wyoming schools into the future". Wyoming Public Media.

Political offices
Preceded by Cindy Hill	Wyoming Superintendent of Public Instruction; 2015–2022	Succeeded by Brian Schroeder; Acting
Preceded by James Lane	Virginia Superintendent of Public Instruction; 2022–2023	Succeeded by Lisa Coons
