= Virginia Department of Education =

State education agency of Virginia

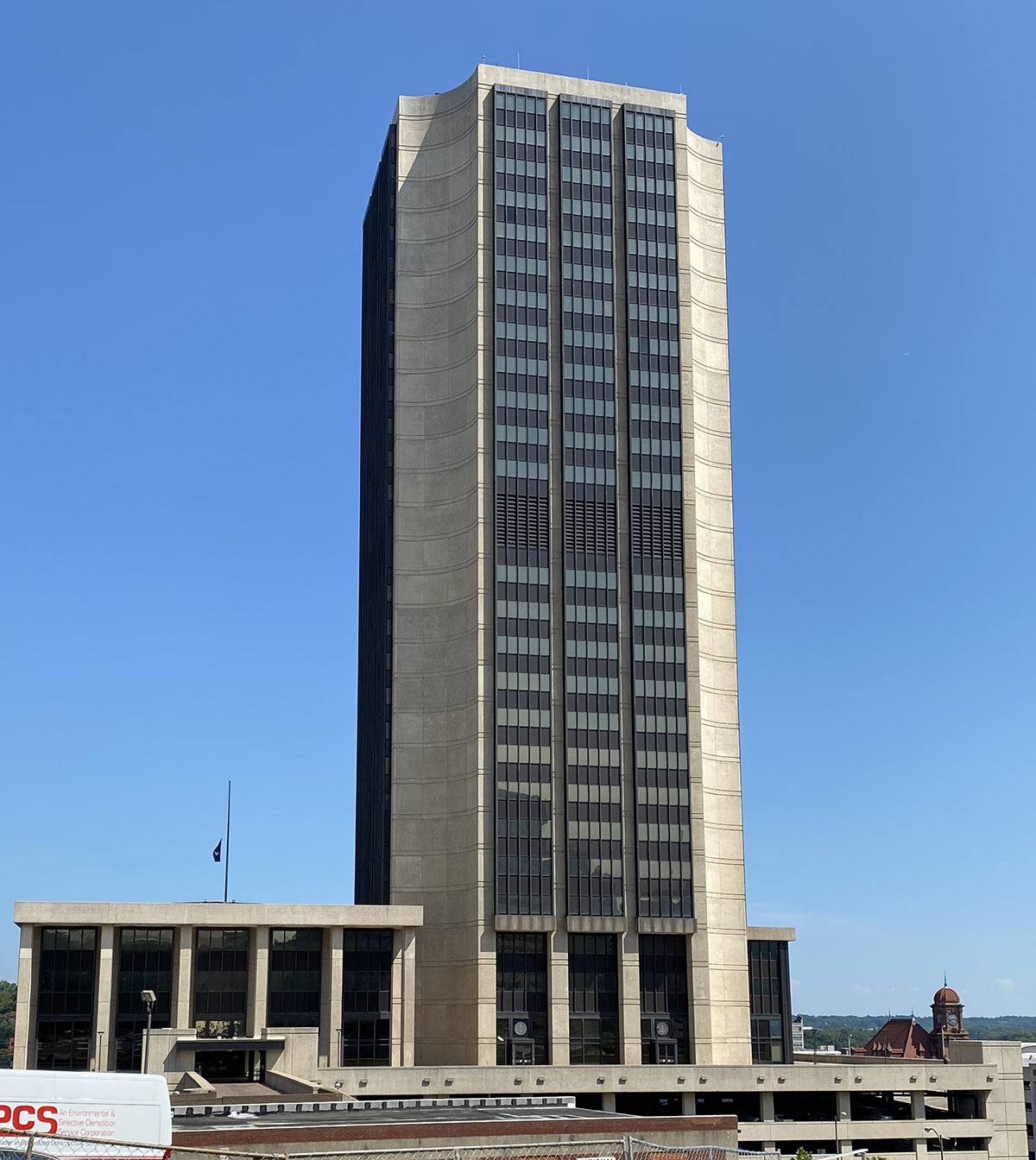

Agency overview
- Formed: March 4, 1918; 108 years ago
- Preceding agency: Department of Public Instruction
- Jurisdiction: Government of Virginia
- Headquarters: 101 N 14th St, Richmond, Virginia, U.S.
- Agency executives: Jeffrey O. Smith, Secretary of Education; Jenna Conway, Superintendent of Public Instruction
- Website: Official website

The Virginia Department of Education is the state education agency of the Commonwealth of Virginia. It is headquartered in the James Monroe Building in Richmond. The department is headed by the Secretary of Education (currently Jeffrey O. Smith), who is a member of the Virginia Governor's Cabinet, and the Superintendent of Public Instruction (currently Lisa Coons), a position that is also appointed by the Governor of Virginia. The Secretary of Education is responsible for heading the department and for overseeing Virginia's 16 public colleges and universities, the Virginia Community College System, the commonwealth's five higher education centers, and Virginia's public museums.

The Virginia Department of Education is organized into four divisions: Division of Budget, Finance, and Operations; Division of School Quality, Instruction, and Performance; Division of School Readiness; and the Department of Policy, Equity, and Communications. Communication by the agency is handled through news releases and memoranda from the Superintendent of Public Instruction.

== Educator licensure ==
Within the public schools in Virginia, teachers and school administrators must be licensed by the Department.

== Standards of learning ==
The state assesses student performance in the elementary school and secondary school grades by the Standards of Learning (SOL) test. Students are required to take them once they reach the third grade. Virginia did not join the consortium of states to adopt the Common Core standards within the Commonwealth; instead the Standards of Learning form the foundation for curriculum for all of Virginia's public schools.

Virginia provides Standards for certain subject areas that are not currently tested, including Technology, Computer Science, and World Languages.

== Educational outreach ==
In 2013, the Virginia Department of Education released a 25-minute video, "The Virginia Indians: Meet the Tribes," covering both historical and contemporary Native American life in Virginia.

== Pandemic response ==
In response to the global COVID-19 pandemic, the Virginia Department of Education created a guidance document for Virginia's public school leaders focused on a return to learning for the Fall of 2020. In December, 2020, the Governor of Virginia recognized members of the Virginia Department of Education with his Honor Awards, for the agency's pandemic response with the Recover, Redesign, and Restart document.

The American Rescue Plan Act of 2021 allocated $2.1 billion in pandemic relief money for Virginia public schools. Using $34 million of those funds, the Virginia Department of Education developed a grant program, "Onward and Upward: Supporting Literacy and Mathematics" awarding grants to public colleges and universities to develop resources and professional development programs for reading and mathematics teachers.
