= List of presidents of Longwood University =

Longwood University, a public liberal arts college in Farmville, Virginia, is led by a president selected by a Board of Visitors, who are appointed by the Governor of Virginia. Beginning with its founding as a private finishing school in 1839, through its 1884 conversion to a public normal school, and its postwar transition to a coeducational university, Longwood has had twenty-seven presidents. The current president is W. Taylor Reveley IV, who was inaugurated in 2013.

== Principals (1839–1884) ==
In the private finishing school era, when the school was known as Farmville Female Seminary and later Farmville Female College, the school president was known as a principal.

#	Name	Years	Reference	Image
1	Solomon Lea	1839–1843		
2	Lorenzo Lea	1843–1846		
3	Lorenzo Coburn	1846–1850		
4	John Benjamin Tinsley	1850–1855		
5	Benjamin Gould	1855–1859		
6	George La Monte	1859–1862		
7	Arnaud Preot	1862–1869		
8	S.F. Nottingham	1869–1870		
9	Frances Marion Edwards	1871–1872		
10	James Crawley	1872–1873		
11	Paul Whitehead	1873–1882		
12	Mary Elizabeth Carter	1882–1884		

== Presidents (1884–present) ==
Following the Virginia government's purchase of the then-Farmville College in 1884 and conversion into a normal school, the head official of Longwood became known as a president.

#	Name	Years	Reference	Image
13	William Henry Ruffner	1884–1887		
14	John Atkinson Cunningham	1887–1897		
15	Robert Frazer	1898–1902		
16	Joseph L. Jarman	1902–1946		
17	Dabney S. Lancaster	1946–1955		
18	Francis Lankford, Jr.	1955–1965		
19	James Heflin Newman	1965–1967		
20	Henry Irving Willett, Jr.	1967–1981		
21	Janet Daly Greenwood	1981–1987		
22	George Robert Haley	1987–1988		
23	William F. Dorrill	1988–1996		
24	Patricia Cormier	1996–2010		
25	Patrick Finnegan	2010–2012		
26	W. Taylor Reveley IV	2013–present		
