= Virginia Employment Commission =

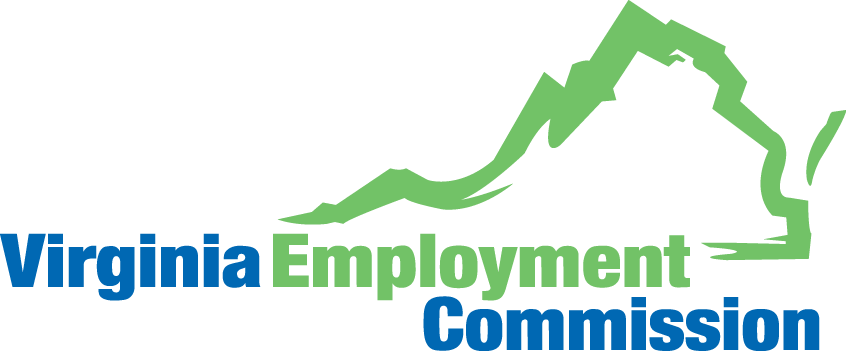

Agency overview
- Jurisdiction: Virginia
- Headquarters: Richmond, Virginia
- Agency executives: G. Bryan Slater, Virginia Secretary of Labor; D. Mitch Melis, Commissioner
- Website: www.vec.virginia.gov

The Virginia Employment Commission (VEC) is an agency of the Virginia state government, in the United States, that provides benefits and services to unemployed citizens, such as employment programs. The agency currently runs a monthly newsletter, sends monthly reports to the Virginia General Assembly, and issues press releases.
