= Megan Healy =

American government official

1st Virginia Secretary of Labor
- In office July 1, 2021 – January 15, 2022
- Governor: Ralph Northam
- Preceded by: None (office created)
- Succeeded by: G. Bryan Slater

Personal details
- Party: Democratic
- Education: Virginia Tech; Virginia Commonwealth University; Old Dominion University

Megan Healy is an American government official who served as secretary of labor in the cabinet of Virginia Governor Ralph Northam.

Political offices
Preceded by None	Virginia Secretary of Labor; 2021–present	Succeeded by Incumbent
