= Virginia Department of Labor and Industry =

State government agency in Virginia

Virginia Department for Labor and Industry
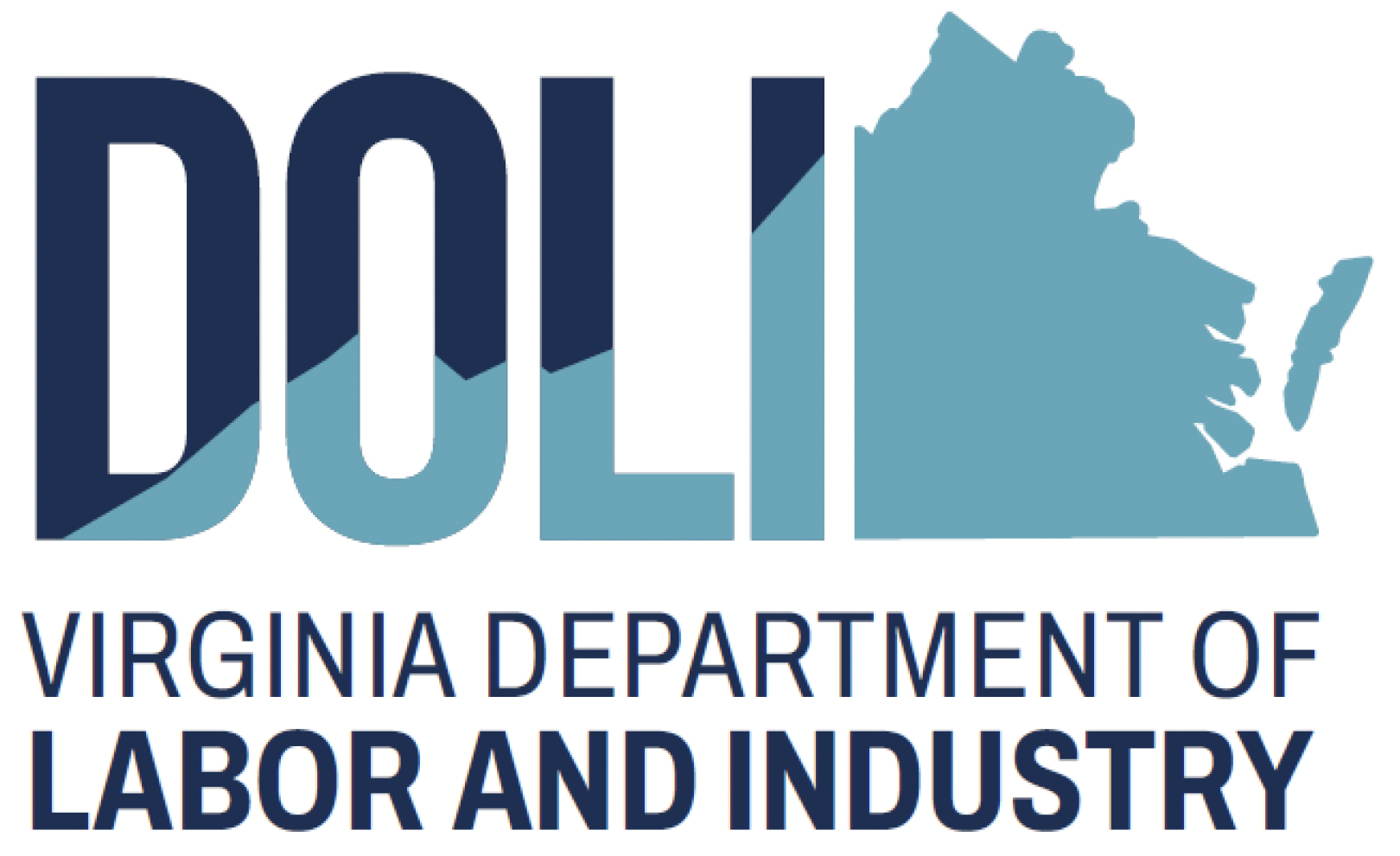

Agency overview
- Formed: 1898; 128 years ago
- Type: Department
- Jurisdiction: Virginia
- Headquarters: Richmond, Virginia
- Annual budget: $18.4m USD (2020)
- Agency executives: Jessica Looman, Virginia Secretary of Labor; James Frederick, Virginia Commissioner of Labor and Industry

The Virginia Department of Labor and Industry (DOLI) is the executive branch agency of the state government responsible for administering labor and employment laws and programs in the U.S. state of Virginia.

== Background ==
Established by the Virginia General Assembly in 1898, the agency is headquartered in Richmond, Virginia and is overseen by the Virginia Secretary of Labor, with day-to-day operations led by an agency commissioner appointed by the Governor of Virginia. The mission of the agency is "to make Virginia a better place in which to work, live, and conduct business."

Departments and divisions within the agency include a Labor Law Division, Virginia Occupational Safety and Health (VOSH) Compliance, and Boiler Safety Compliance Division. The agency administers occupational health and safety programs, and funds registered apprenticeship and job training programs in the state. The agency also administers child labor, minimum wage, and other labor laws. The Virginia Apprenticeship Council and the Safety and Health Codes Board are the advisory bodies formally constituted in the Code of Virginia which are affiliated with the agency.

The agency is currently led by James Frederick, who has served as commissioner since January 2026.
