= Lisa Coons =

American educator

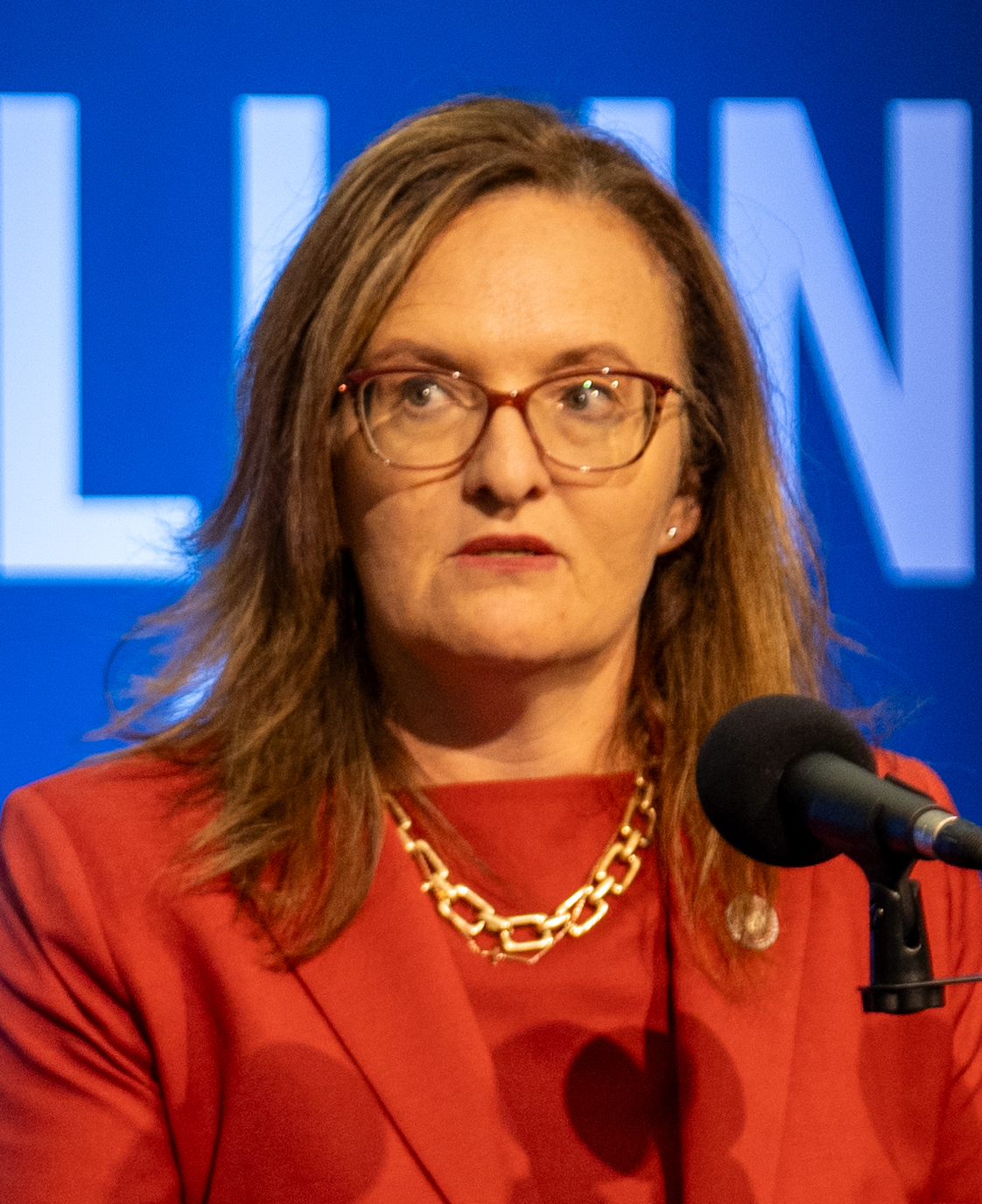
- Coons in 2023

27th Virginia Superintendent of Public Instruction
- In office April 17, 2023 – March 14, 2025
- Governor: Glenn Youngkin
- Preceded by: Jillian Balow
- Succeeded by: Emily Anne Gullickson

Personal details
- Education: Wright State University; Lipscomb University

Lisa Coons is an American educator who served as the Virginia Superintendent of Public Instruction from April 2023 to March 14, 2025. She was previously the chief academic officer of the Tennessee Department of Education from June 2019 to April 2023.

== Early life and education ==
Coons was raised on a military base. She completed a B.S. in secondary education (1998) and an M.A. in educational technology with a concentration in educational leadership (2003) from Wright State University. She earned an Ed.S. in collaborative professional learning in 2014 at Lipscomb University. Coons conducted her project, Improving Literacy for all Adolescents, under advisor Tammy Shutt. She earned an Ed.D. in learning organizations and strategic change in 2016 from Lipscomb University. Her dissertation was titled, The Impact of the EDI Framework and Inquiry-based Learning Strategies on Student Achievement in Middle School. Jeanne Fain was her doctoral advisor.

== Career ==
From August 2009 to April 2012, Coons was assistant superintendent of Ross Local Schools. She was director of academics of LEAD Public Schools from April 2012 to July 2013. Coons was a middle school supervisor at Sumner County Schools from July 2013 to September 2014. From October 2014 to August 2016, she was executive director of instructional leadership at the Tennessee Department of Education. Coons was executive officer of district priority schools at Metropolitan Nashville Public Schools from August 2017 to June 2019. Coons became the chief academic officer of the Tennessee Department of Education in June 2019.

In March 2023, Coons was named by Virginia governor Glenn Youngkin as the incoming 27th Virginia Superintendent of Public Instruction, succeeding Jillian Balow. She started on April 17, 2023. She had been a finalist to be the next commissioner of the Nebraska Department of Education. Coons abruptly resigned from her position on March 14, 2025.
