= Virginia Superintendent of Public Instruction =

Virginia state government position

Superintendent of Public Instruction of Virginia
- Incumbent; Jenna Conway since January 13, 2026
- Term length: Coincident with the Governor
- Website: State Website

In Virginia, the Superintendent of Public Instruction is the chief executive of the Virginia Department of Education and also serves as the Secretary of the Virginia Board of Education. Lisa Coons was appointed Virginia's 27th Superintendent of Public Instruction by Governor Glenn Youngkin, effective March 22, 2023. The former state superintendent, Jillian Balow, resigned in March 2023.

== Role ==
The Virginia Constitution states that the Superintendent be “an experienced educator.” The Superintendent of Public Instruction serves for a term coincident with the Governor making the appointment. The duties of the Superintendent of Public Instruction are addressed in Title 22.1, Chapter 3 of the Code of Virginia.

The duties of the State Superintendent of Public Instruction include:

1. Serve as secretary of the Board of Education;
2. Provide such assistance in his office as shall be necessary for the proper and uniform enforcement of the provisions of the school laws in cooperation with the local school authorities;
3. Prepare and furnish such forms for attendance officers, teachers and other school officials as are required by law;
4. (Expires July 1, 2025) At least annually, survey all local school divisions to identify critical shortages of (i) teachers and administrative personnel by geographic area, by school division, or by subject matter and (ii) school bus drivers by geographic area and local school division and report such critical shortages to each local school division and to the Virginia Retirement System.

== List of Superintendents of Public Instruction ==
Denotes acting/interim role before appointment or after resignation

List of Virginia superintendents of public instruction from 1870 – till date.
No.	Portrait	Name (Birth–Death)	Term	Governor
1		William Henry Ruffner (1824–1908)	March 5, 1870 – March 15, 1882	
2		Richard Ratcliffe Farr (1845–1892)	March 15, 1882 – March 15, 1886	William E. Cameron
3		John L. Buchanan	March 15, 1886 – January 1, 1890	Fitzhugh Lee
4		John E. Massey (1819–1901)	January 1, 1890 – March 15, 1898	Philip W. McKinney Charles Triplett O'Ferrall
5		Joseph W. Southall (1833–1909)	March 15, 1898 – February 1, 1906	James Hoge Tyler Andrew Jackson Montague
6		Joseph D. Eggleston II (1867–1953)	February 1, 1906 – January 1, 1912	
7		Reaumur C. Stearnes (1866–1945)	January 1, 1912 – February 1, 1918	
8		Harris Hart (1877–1962)	February 1, 1918 – January 1, 1931	
9		Sidney B. Hall	January 1, 1931 – August 31, 1941	
10		Dabney S. Lancaster (1889–1975)	September 1, 1941 – June 15, 1946	
11	Black-and-white photographic portrait of G. Tyler Miller	G. Tyler Miller (1902–1988)	June 15, 1946 – August 31, 1949 (Note: Resigned)	
–		Dowell J. Howard (Note: Served as acting superintendent until his appointment on May 12, 1950) (1897–1957)	September 1, 1949 – May 12, 1950	
12		Dowell J. Howard (1897–1957)	May 12, 1950 – February 23, 1957 (Note: Died in office)	
13		Davis Young Paschall (1911–2001)	March 13, 1957 – August 15, 1960	
14		Woodrow W. Wilkerson (1914–1986)	August 16, 1960 – 1975	
15		Walter Eugene Campbell (1916–1980)	1975 – 1979	
16		Spear John Davis (1928–2009)	1979 – 1990	
17		Joseph A. Spagnolo (1943–2020)	1990 – 1994	Douglas Wilder
18		William C. Bosher Jr. (1946–2014)	1994 – 1996	
19		Richard T. LaPointe	1996 – 1998	
20		Paul D. Stapleton	1998 – 1999	
21		Jo Lynne DeMary	2000 – 2006	
–		Patricia I. Wright	2006 – 2006	
22		Billy K. Cannaday Jr.	2006 – 2008	
23		Patricia I. Wright	2008 – 2014	
24		Steven R. Staples	2014 – 2018	Terry McAuliffe
–		Steven M. Constantino	2018 – 2018	
25		James F. Lane	2018 – 2022	Ralph Northam
26		Jillian Balow (born 1970)	2022 – 2023	Glenn Youngkin
27		Lisa Coons	March 22, 2023 – March 14, 2025	Glenn Youngkin
28		Emily Anne Gullickson	March 27, 2025 – 2026	Glenn Youngkin
28		Jenna Conway	January 13, 2026 – Incumbent	Abigail Spanberger
