= Virginia Secretary of Labor =

Secretary of Labor of the Commonwealth of Virginia
- Seal of the Commonwealth of Virginia

- Flag of Virginia

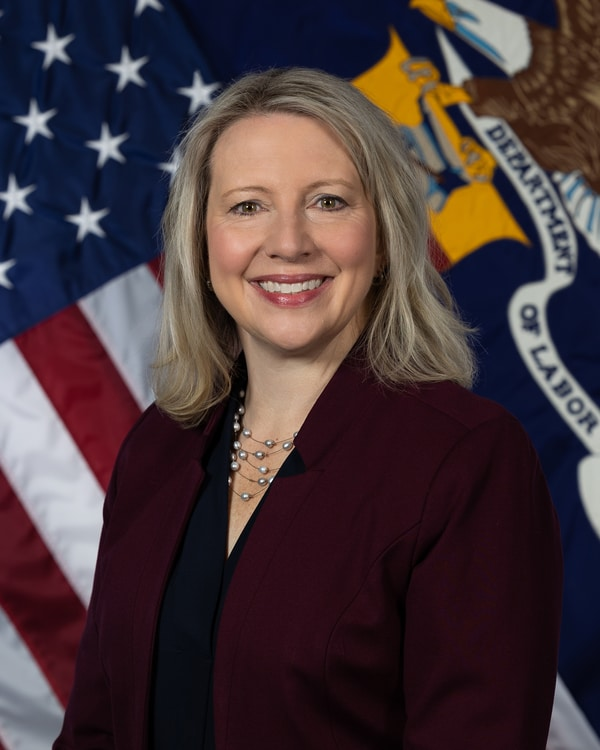
- Incumbent; Jessica Looman since January 17, 2026
- Style: Madam Secretary
- Member of: Virginia Governor's Cabinet
- Nominator: The governor
- Appointer: The governor with advice and consent from the Senate and House
- Term length: 4 years
- Inaugural holder: Megan Healy
- Formation: July 1, 2021; 5 years ago
- Website: labor.virginia.gov

The secretary of labor is a member of the Virginia Governor's Cabinet. The current secretary, as of January 2026, is Jessica Looman. The office was established in 2021 and oversees numerous labor-related agencies in Virginia.

== Duties ==
The Secretary is charged with advising the Governor of Virginia on all labor-related matters, while overseeing the following state agencies:

- Virginia Department of Labor and Industry
- Virginia Department of Professional and Occupational Regulation
- Virginia Employment Commission
- Virginia Board of Workforce Development
- Virginia Works - Department of Workforce Development and Advancement

== List of secretaries of labor ==
- Megan Healy (2021–2022)
- G. Bryan Slater (2022–2026)
- Jessica Looman (2026–present)
