= David Chipman =

American law enforcement officer (born 1966)

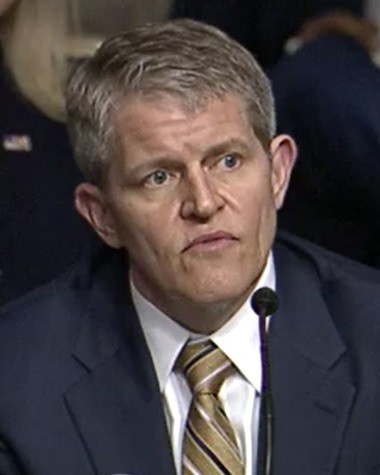
- David Chipman during a congressional hearing on May 26, 2021
- Born: 1966 (age 59–60); Hanover, New Hampshire, U.S.
- Education: American University (BS); Johns Hopkins University (MS)

David Howland Chipman (born 1966) is an American former ATF agent and gun control advocate who was most recently the nominee to serve as the director of the Bureau of Alcohol, Tobacco, Firearms and Explosives in the Biden administration; however, this nomination was withdrawn following strong opposition due to Chipman's work with gun control groups Everytown and Giffords.

== Early life and education ==
Chipman was born in Hanover, New Hampshire, and raised in Oakland County, Michigan. After graduating from Phillips Exeter Academy, he earned a Bachelor of Science degree in justice from American University and a Master of Science in management from Johns Hopkins University.

== Career ==
Chipman spent 25 years as a special agent in the Bureau of Alcohol, Tobacco, Firearms, monitoring firearm trafficking from Virginia to New York City. After leaving ATF, Chipman became a senior policy advisor at Giffords. In late-2013, he joined ShotSpotter as the senior vice president of U.S. public safety solutions. Chipman was nominated as director of ATF in April 2021, following an announcement from President Joe Biden. On April 12, 2021, his nomination was sent to the Senate. On May 26, 2021, a hearing on his nomination was held before the Senate Judiciary Committee. The committee deadlocked on his nomination in a party-line vote on June 24, 2021. On September 9, 2021, the White House announced that it would withdraw Chipman's nomination due to opposition to his stances on gun control.

== Alleged presence at the Waco siege ==
During his confirmation hearing, photos of David Chipman being present at the ruins of the Mount Carmel Center following the Waco Siege began to circulate online after being published by multiple news outlets. Chipman later denied being the man present in the photo, and it was said in Justice Department Records that the photo was taken on April 19, 1993, and that Chipman was not sent to the site until early May.
