= Minnesota Department of Labor and Industry =

Cabinet-level agency in America

Agency overview
- Jurisdiction: Minnesota
- Headquarters: 443 Lafayette Road N., Saint Paul, Minnesota
- Agency executive: Nicole Blissenbach, Commissioner
- Parent agency: State of Minnesota
- Website: Official website

The Minnesota Department of Labor and Industry (DLI) is a cabinet-level agency in the State of Minnesota.

== Background ==
The agency employs approximately 648 workers throughout the state and oversees the state's apprenticeship, construction codes and licensing, occupational safety and health, wage and hour standards, and workers' compensation programs.

== See also ==
- Minnesota Department of Corrections
- Minnesota Department of Education
- Minnesota Department of Employment and Economic Development
- Metropolitan Council (Minnesota)
- Metropolitan Sports Facilities Commission
- Minnesota Department of Military Affairs
- Minnesota Department of Natural Resources
- Minnesota Pollution Control Agency
