= David Weil (government official) =

American academic and economist

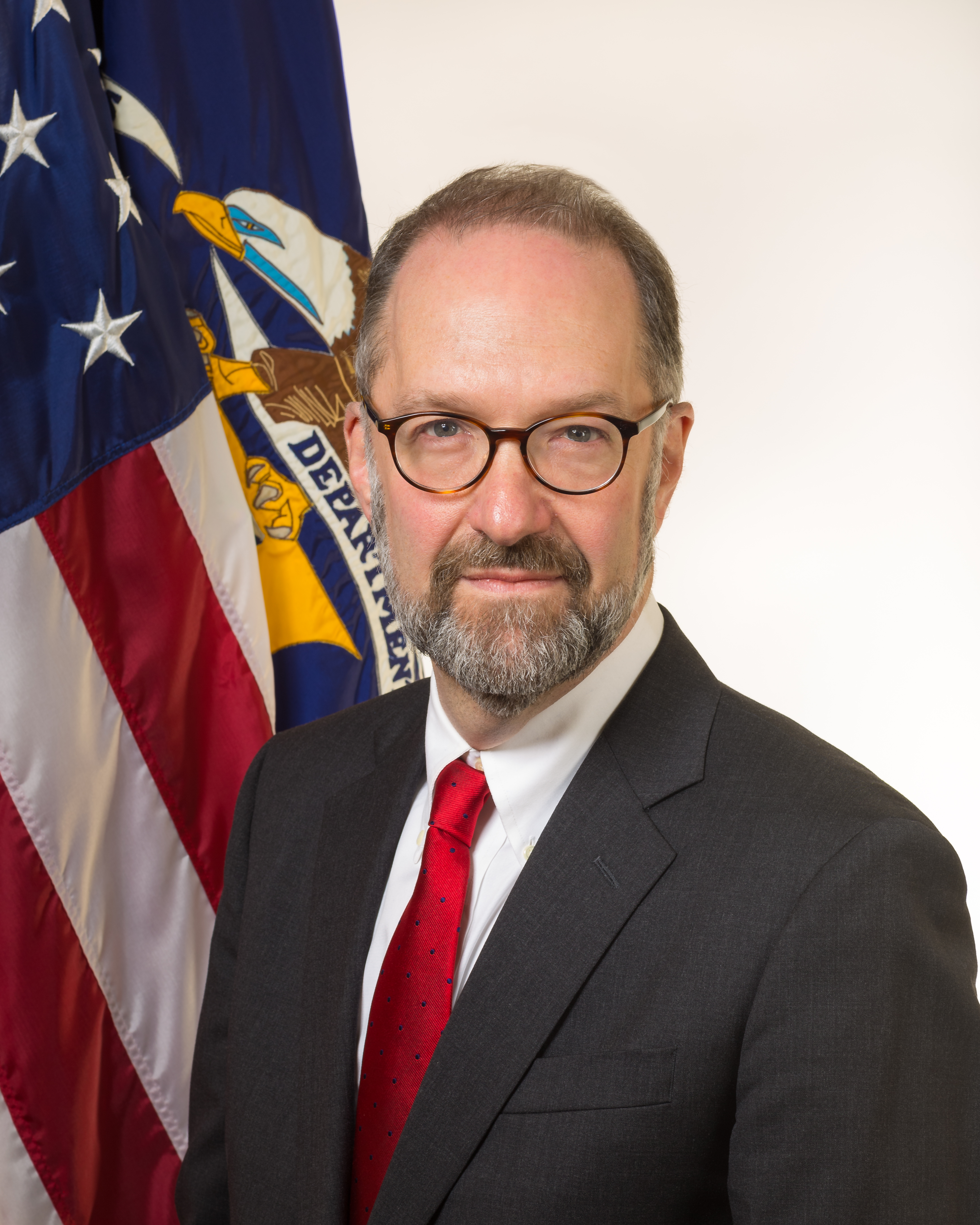

Administrator of the Wage and Hour Division
- In office 2014–2017
- President: Barack Obama
- Preceded by: Nancy Leppink
- Succeeded by: Laura Fortman

Personal details
- Education: Cornell University (BS); Harvard University (MPP, PhD)

David Weil is an American academic and economist who was the nominee to serve as administrator of the Wage and Hour Division at the United States Department of Labor in the Biden administration. He previously served in this role during the Obama administration from 2014 to 2017.

== Education ==
Weil earned a Bachelor of Science degree in industrial and labor relations from Cornell University, followed by a Master of Public Policy and PhD from Harvard University.

== Career ==
From 1998 to 2013, Weil worked as a professor of economics at Boston University. From 2017 to present day, Weil serves as the dean of the Heller School for Social Policy and Management at Brandeis University.

=== Obama administration ===
On September 10, 2013, President Barack Obama nominated Weil to serve as the administrator of the Wage and Hour Division. Hearings were held before the Senate HELP Committee on December 10, 2013. The committee favorably reported his nomination to the Senate floor on December 18, 2013. Weil's initial nomination expired at the end of the year and was returned to President Obama on January 3, 2014.

President Obama resent his nomination to the Senate shortly after. On January 29, 2014, the committee favorably reported his nomination to the Senate floor. Weil was confirmed by the entire Senate on April 28, 2014, by a vote of 51-42.

Weil served as administrator from 2014 until 2017.

=== Other work ===
After the end of the Obama administration, he joined the Heller School for Social Policy and Management as dean and professor. Weil has criticized the workforce models of companies like Uber, which categorize drivers as independent contractors rather than workers.

=== Biden nomination ===
On June 3, 2021, President Joe Biden nominated Weil to be the administrator of the Wage and Hour Division in the Department of Labor. Hearings were held before the Senate HELP Committee on July 15, 2021. The committee deadlocked on his nomination on August 3, 2021. Weil's nomination expired at the end of the year and was returned to President Biden on January 3, 2022. President Biden resent his nomination the next day.

On January 13, 2022, the committee favorably reported his nomination to the Senate floor. On March 30, 2022, a cloture motion to move forward with Weil's nomination failed to pass the entire Senate by a vote of 47–53; Democratic Senators Joe Manchin, Kyrsten Sinema and Mark Kelly voted against cloture. Without cloture, the nomination was effectively dead given that a nomination vote could not be held. This marked the first defeat of one of President Biden's nominees in a floor vote. Biden eventually nominated Acting Administrator Jessica Looman to the role; she was confirmed by the Senate in October 2023.
