= G. Bryan Slater =

American political operative (born 1961)

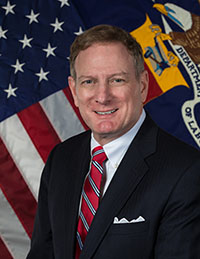

2nd Virginia Secretary of Labor
- In office January 15, 2022 – January 17, 2026
- Governor: Glenn Youngkin
- Preceded by: Megan Healy
- Succeeded by: Jessica Looman

United States Assistant Secretary of Labor for Administration and Management
- In office 2017–2021
- President: Donald Trump
- Succeeded by: Rachana Desai Martin

11th Virginia Secretary of Administration
- In office 1998–2001
- Governor: Jim Gilmore
- Preceded by: Michael E. Thomas
- Succeeded by: Donald L. Moseley

Personal details
- Born: George Bryan Slater; March 28, 1961 (age 64) Richmond, Virginia, U.S.
- Party: Republican
- Education: Ferrum College (AA); University of Richmond (BA)

George Bryan Slater (born March 28, 1961) is an American political operative who served as Virginia Secretary of Labor under Governor Glenn Youngkin from 2022 to 2026. A Republican, he managed Jim Gilmore's campaigns for Attorney General and Governor before serving as his Secretary of Administration from 1998 to 2001.

Political offices
Preceded by Michael E. Thomas	Virginia Secretary of Administration; 1998–2001	Succeeded by Donald L. Moseley
Preceded by Megan Healy	Virginia Secretary of Labor (nominee); 2022–present	Succeeded by Incumbent
