= COVID-19 pandemic in Maryland =

- Disease: COVID-19
- Pathogen: SARS-CoV-2
- Location: Maryland, U.S.
- Index case: Montgomery County
- Arrival date: March 5, 2020
- Confirmed cases: 1,303,829
- Hospitalized cases: 592 (current)
- Critical cases: 66 (current)
- Deaths: 15,575

Government website
- coronavirus.maryland.gov

The COVID-19 pandemic was confirmed to have reached the U.S. state of Maryland in March 2020. The first three cases of the virus were reported in Montgomery County on March 5, 2020. As of December 16, 2022, the Maryland Department of Health (MDH) reported 1,303,829 positive cases, 15,575 confirmed deaths, and 4,914,005 are fully vaccinated with the primary vaccination series. County fully vaccinated rates range from 93% in Montgomery County to 52% in Somerset County.

== Timeline ==
COVID-19 pandemic medical cases in Maryland by county
County (Note: County of residency. Location of original infection may vary.)	Cases (Note: Includes only confirmed cases. Actual case numbers are probably higher.) (Note: "–" denotes that no data is currently available for that county, not that the value is zero.)	Deaths	Ref.
24 / 24	1,318,234	15,691	Ref.
Allegany	21,062	379	
Anne Arundel	115,893	1,217	
Baltimore County	166,263	2,681	
Baltimore (City)	144,396	1,880	(Note: The City of Baltimore is considered the equal of a county for most purposes and is a county-equivalent.)
Calvert	14,341	160	
Caroline	7,137	88	
Carroll	27,133	444	
Cecil	19,632	277	
Charles	37,339	390	
Dorchester	9,290	113	
Frederick	56,573	573	
Garrett	6,929	123	
Harford	48,302	643	
Howard	61,658	424	
Kent	3,843	71	
Montgomery	236,964	2,225	
Prince George's	220,968	2,267	
Queen Anne's	8,638	127	
St. Mary's	23,920	238	
Somerset	6,041	77	
Talbot	7,023	105	
Washington	40,239	613	
Wicomico	24,106	349	
Worcester	10,544	179	
Unknown		48	
Updated December 30, 2022; Data is publicly reported by Maryland Department of Health

In late January 2020, Maryland hospitals began travel screening for coronavirus when taking in new patients entering the emergency room. State health officials announced on January 30, 2020, that the first person tested in Maryland for the novel coronavirus did not have the virus. Fran Phillips, deputy state health secretary for public health services, stated that the risk for Maryland residents of contracting the virus remained low. Maryland medical facilities, educational institutions, and businesses disseminated guidance from the Centers for Disease Control and Prevention (CDC). Towson University stated that a professor would not return to classes while a family member was tested.

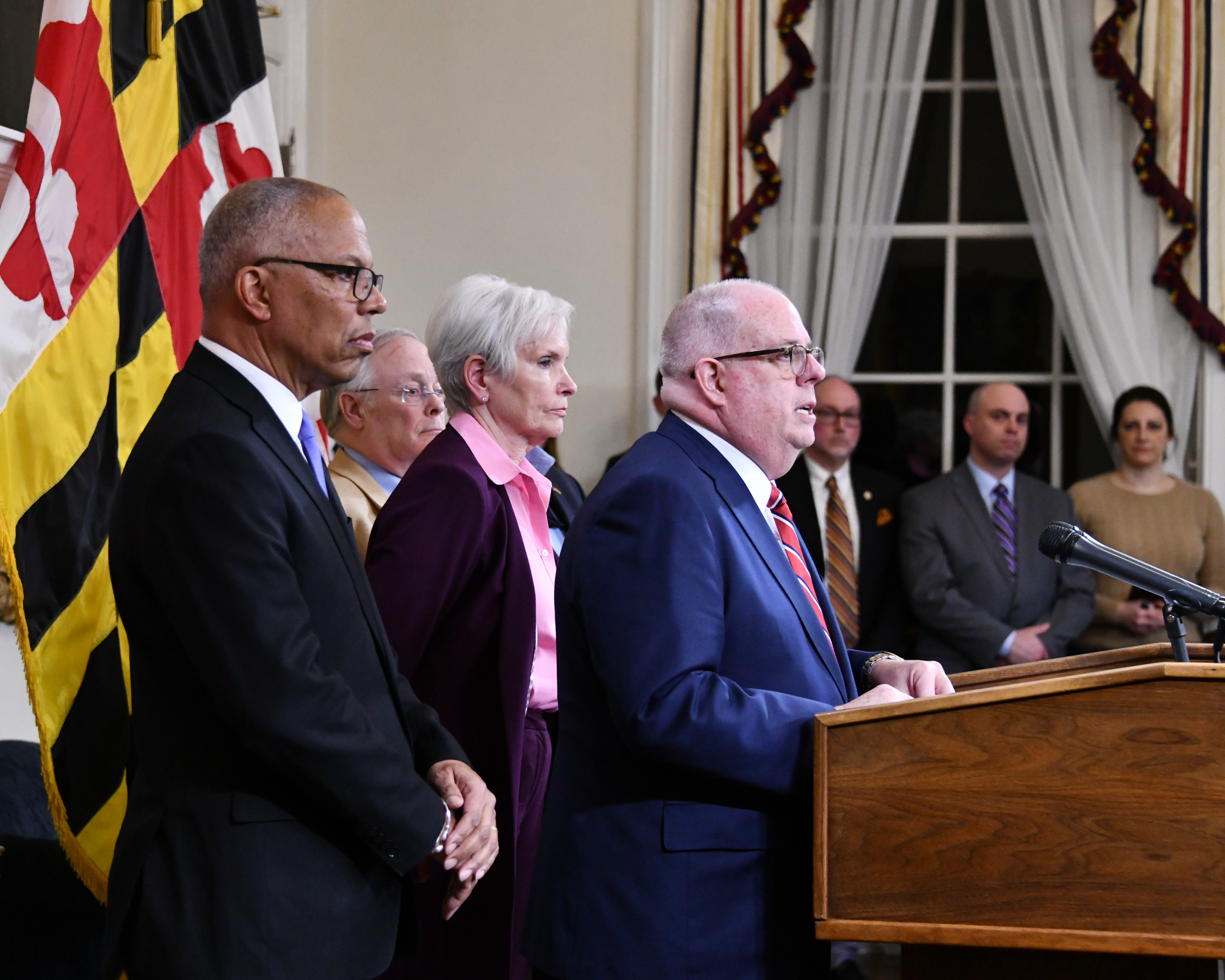
Governor of Maryland Larry Hogan announces the first confirmed case of coronavirus in Maryland to the press on March 5

On March 5, Governor Larry Hogan confirmed the first three cases of coronavirus in Montgomery County: one married couple in their 70s and an unrelated woman in her 50s. All three patients were on the same river cruise on the Nile River in Egypt. Upon their return, one of the patients traveled to suburban Philadelphia, Pennsylvania, meeting with students. This prompted the Pennsylvania Department of Health and Central Bucks School District to temporarily close three schools in that district to undergo cleaning. Another patient visited The Village at Rockville retirement community for an event that had between 70 and 100 people. Attendees of the event were told to monitor their temperature and call their physician or the Maryland Emergency Management Agency if they began to exhibit symptoms. All three patients had fully recovered by March 12. Hogan declared a state of emergency after announcing the state's first positive tests.

By March 12, twelve cases of coronavirus had been confirmed in Maryland — two remained hospitalized and three had recovered. Importantly, Maryland confirmed the state's first known case of community transmission in a Prince George's County resident with no known exposure to coronavirus through travel or an infected individual. The first case of community transmission indicates that "we are entering a new phase of working to mitigate and limit the spread of this pandemic," reported Hogan. On March 12, Karen Salmon, Maryland's Superintendent of Schools, announced that all public schools would be closed for two weeks beginning March 16. Hogan raised the state's emergency activation system to activate the Maryland National Guard and banned gatherings of more than 250 people. The National Guard was activated to a higher state of readiness. Hogan delegated routine state government operations to Lieutenant Governor Boyd Rutherford so he could allocate more time to combating the virus.

Hogan ordered all of the state's casinos, racetracks, and off-track betting to cease operations on March 15, with the shutdown beginning on March 16 at 12:01 am. In addition, Hogan also warned in a statement that bars and restaurants are to follow the ban of gatherings of over 250 people in advance of St. Patrick's Day celebrations. He stated that if any bar or restaurant failed to comply with the restrictions set, they would be charged with a misdemeanor carrying a penalty of one year in jail and/or up to $5,000 in fines.

In the afternoon, the Howard County Health Department announced the county's first confirmed coronavirus case: an 82-year-old woman with an underlying condition who resided at the Lorien Elkridge, a nursing home in Elkridge. The MDH initiated the process of contacting and notifying all staff, residents, and family members about the possible exposure to COVID-19 in the nursing home. Six medics were exposed to the woman not knowing that she was a COVID-19 patient; all six medics went into self-quarantine, according to the Howard County fire chief. This case brings the total number of positive cases to 32 for the state.

Hogan held a press conference in the late morning of March 16, where he announced an executive order that would require all bars, restaurants, gyms, and movie theaters in the state to close at 5:00 pm. Restaurants with delivery, drive-thru, and carry out services are exempt from closing completely.

On the morning of March 17, the MDH confirmed 20 additional positive cases in the state, including the first case in Frederick County. Only two of the three cases announced by Howard County on March 16 were added to the MDH's total figure for the day. The additional case announced by Baltimore Mayor Jack Young was also not included in the totals. The official figure from the MDH was now 57. Hogan announced an executive order that postponed the Maryland primary elections. A series of restrictions and cuts surrounding transportation were also announced on March 17.

For the first time since the Civil War, the Maryland General Assembly's annual session ended early, due to coronavirus concerns. The session, which usually runs for 90 days, was ended three weeks earlier than normal on March 18. In the time before the session was hurriedly ended, many coronavirus legislation measures were passed, including the authorization to draw up to $100 million from the "rainy day" fund and extending temporary unemployment benefits for workers who are either quarantined or whose jobs are closed temporarily. The Assembly also passed legislation that makes price gouging and firing workers for being quarantined illegal in the state. All legislation would have to be signed by Governor Hogan to be made law, but would take effect immediately.

A Prince George's County man in his 60s was announced to be the first death in Maryland on March 18. The man contracted the coronavirus through community transmission and had an underlying health problem.

On the morning of March 19, Hogan announced that all shopping centers and entertainment venues were to close as of 5:00 pm that day, stating "This is a race against time" and he's doing everything he can to "avoid shutting down society". He also announced access to the Baltimore/Washington International Airport terminals would be restricted to employees, ticketed passengers, and visitors assisting disabled passengers. On March 23, Hogan ordered all non-essential businesses in the state to close effective at 5:00 pm Monday to prevent further spread of COVID-19. He also announced initiatives to provide relief to small businesses and employees.

On March 25, the Maryland Superintendent of Schools, Dr. Karen B. Salmon, announced the extension of the Maryland school closure from March 30 to April 26, adding on an extra 4 weeks to the school cancellation.

On March 29, the number of confirmed COVID-19 cases in Maryland continued to rise, reaching over 1,000. Deaths also continued. On March 30, Governor Hogan issued a mandatory stay-at-home order, effective beginning at 8:00 pm EDT that evening. The Governor also required all individuals who have recently traveled out of the state to self quarantine for 14 days. Violation of the order would be punishable by a prison sentence of up to one year and/or a $5,000 fine. A wireless alert was also sent to all mobile devices in the state. Virginia's Governor Ralph Northam and the District of Columbia's Mayor Muriel Bowser issued similar orders on the same day (see COVID-19 pandemic in Virginia and in Washington, D.C.).

On April 2, Maryland confirmed cases of COVID-19 surpassed 2,000 to at least 2,331, 346 new from the previous day; five more people had died, bringing the state's death toll to 36. Of the total confirmed cases, 71% were patients younger than 60. In a request to the federal government, Maryland state asked for more than a million masks, gloves and face shields, and 15,000 body bags. Per released FEMA documents, the state received 138 of 200 requested ventilators, about a third of the 778,129 face masks it requested, just 110,240 of the 421,532 N95 respirator masks it sought, well fewer than half of the 330,540 requested gloves and none of the 100,000 testing swabs it hoped to acquire to test for the virus, nor their requested body bags. "Overall, the oversight committee said FEMA had distributed fewer than 10% of the N95 masks and less than 1% of gloves sought collectively by Maryland, Delaware, the District of Columbia, Pennsylvania, Virginia, and West Virginia."

On April 15, Governor Hogan announced an executive order requiring masks or face coverings in all Maryland grocery stores and pharmacies and on public transportation, effective on April 18, 7:00 AM. On April 17, State Superintendent of Schools Dr. Karen Salmon, after extensive consultation with the State Board of Education and leading public health experts in the state, extended the closure of schools through May 15. On April 18, Governor Larry Hogan announced the state had purchased 500,000 test kits for $9.46 million from South Korea. A Korean Air jet arrived at Baltimore-Washington International Airport with the delivery from LabGenomics. However they turned out to be flawed and were never used. The Hogan administration quietly paid the same South Korean company another $2.5 million for 500,000 replacement tests. On April 24, Hogan announced his "Maryland Strong: Roadmap to Recovery" to slowly lift restrictions and open businesses. The roadmap is a three-stage plan using federal guidelines, National Governors Association guidance, and AEI and Johns Hopkins reports.

On May 1, Hogan announced a Centers for Disease Control field team was dispatched to Wicomico County to increase testing in the area due to the increase of COVID-19 among poultry workers. Wicomico County had the fourth highest COVID-19 case rate in the state, per capita, higher than both Baltimore Baltimore City and County. A two-day drive thru testing site was set up at Arthur W. Perdue Stadium to focus on poultry workers.

On May 6, Hogan announced that effective May 7, safe outdoor activities are allowed such as golf, tennis, boating, fishing, camping, and other activities, although he cautioned that it was still "critical for Marylanders to continue practicing physical distancing." Additionally, the Maryland Department of Health (MDH) issued guidelines to allow elective procedures to resume at the discretion of local hospitals and health care providers. State Superintendent of Schools Dr. Karen Salmon announced the closure of all Maryland Public Schools for the remainder of the 2019 - 2020 academic school year. On May 15, effective at 5:00 pm the "stay-at-home" order was lifted and limited non-essential businesses reopened. However, some jurisdictions continued their "stay-at-home" restrictions including Baltimore City, Montgomery and Prince George's Counties.

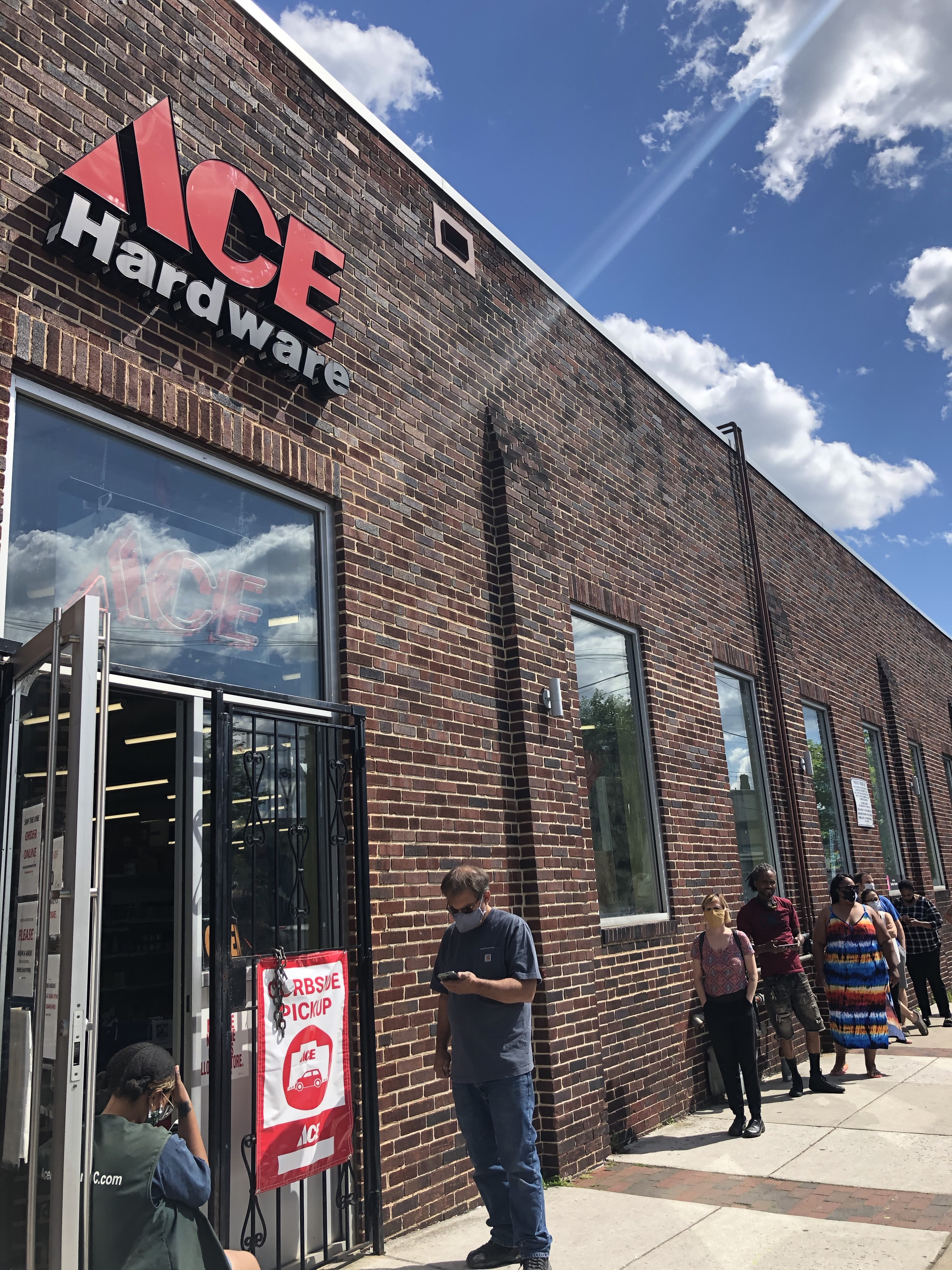
Customers lined up outside ACE Hardware in Baltimore practicing social distancing.

On June 3, Hogan announced Stage 2 of the reopening plan would be effective June 5 at 5:00 pm. On July 29, Hogan expanded his previous face covering order. Effective July 31 at 5:00 pm everyone older than 5 years old must wear face coverings inside all buildings where the public has access, on any public transportation, outside when unable to socially distance, obtaining healthcare services, engaged in work in any area where interaction with others is likely (including commercial office space), and where food is prepared and/or packaged.

On August 16, the state became the 19th state to surpass 100,000 cases. On September 1, Hogan placed the state in Stage 3, effective September 4 at 5:00 pm. On November 10, Hogan implemented restrictions, some similar to Stage 2, effective November 11 at 5:00 pm. Restaurants will be limited to 50% capacity, from 75%. Indoor gatherings of more than 25 people are strongly discouraged. Remote work became mandatory for state employees who were able to do so. The restrictions were imposed on the same day Stephen Decatur High School in Berlin MD moved back to distance learning effective November 11 as a result of positive COVID-19 cases on school. Baltimore and Montgomery County imposed even stricter measures. On November 17, Hogan implemented additional restrictions, similar to Stage 2, effective November 20 at 5:00 pm. Restaurants will be required to close at 10:00 pm each evening for dine in service. Retail, organizations, religious organizations, fitness centers, and similar will be restricted to 50% capacity. Hospital and Nursing Home visitation is suspended.

On December 1, Governor Hogan made numerous medical staffing announcements, including the launch of MarylandMedNow, a portal to recruit medical job seekers, urging colleges and universities to award credit to those with hand-on work experience in healthcare during the pandemic and allowing early graduation for those who have met all graduation requirements and are in their final semester. On December 14, the first doses of COVID-19 vaccines began to arrive in Maryland. On December 17, Governor Hogan implemented additional restrictions including reducing gatherings from 25 to 10 persons, advising against out of state travel, and adding required testing or quarantine after out of state travel.

On January 1, 2021, Maryland reported the second second-highest tally for new daily coronavirus cases since the pandemic began, at 3,557. On January 12, 2021, two confirmed cases of a new, more contagious SARS-CoV-2 variant from the United Kingdom were reported in Maryland. The patients are a married couple in Anne Arundel County, one of whom had a traveling history to the United Kingdom.

On June 15, 2021, Governor Hogan announced that Maryland's COVID-19 state of emergency will end on July 1, 2021. As of that date all remaining state level restrictions, including mask requirements in schools and medical facilities, will end.

On December 4, 2021, the Maryland Department of Health had a "network security incident" which stopped COVID-19 data reporting to the public. While the data reporting was unavailable, Anne Arundel County Health Officer Dr. Nilesh Kalyanaraman said, "It's kind of like our vision is a little fuzzy, right? We don't know the case rate." During this time, hospitals in Maryland neared capacity.

== Reopening stages ==
On April 24, 2020, Governor Larry Hogan announced his "Maryland Strong: Roadmap to Recover" plan that illustrates three stages in re-opening the state. The plan uses federal guidelines, National Governors Association guidance, and AEI and Johns Hopkins reports.

=== Stage 1 (May 2020) ===
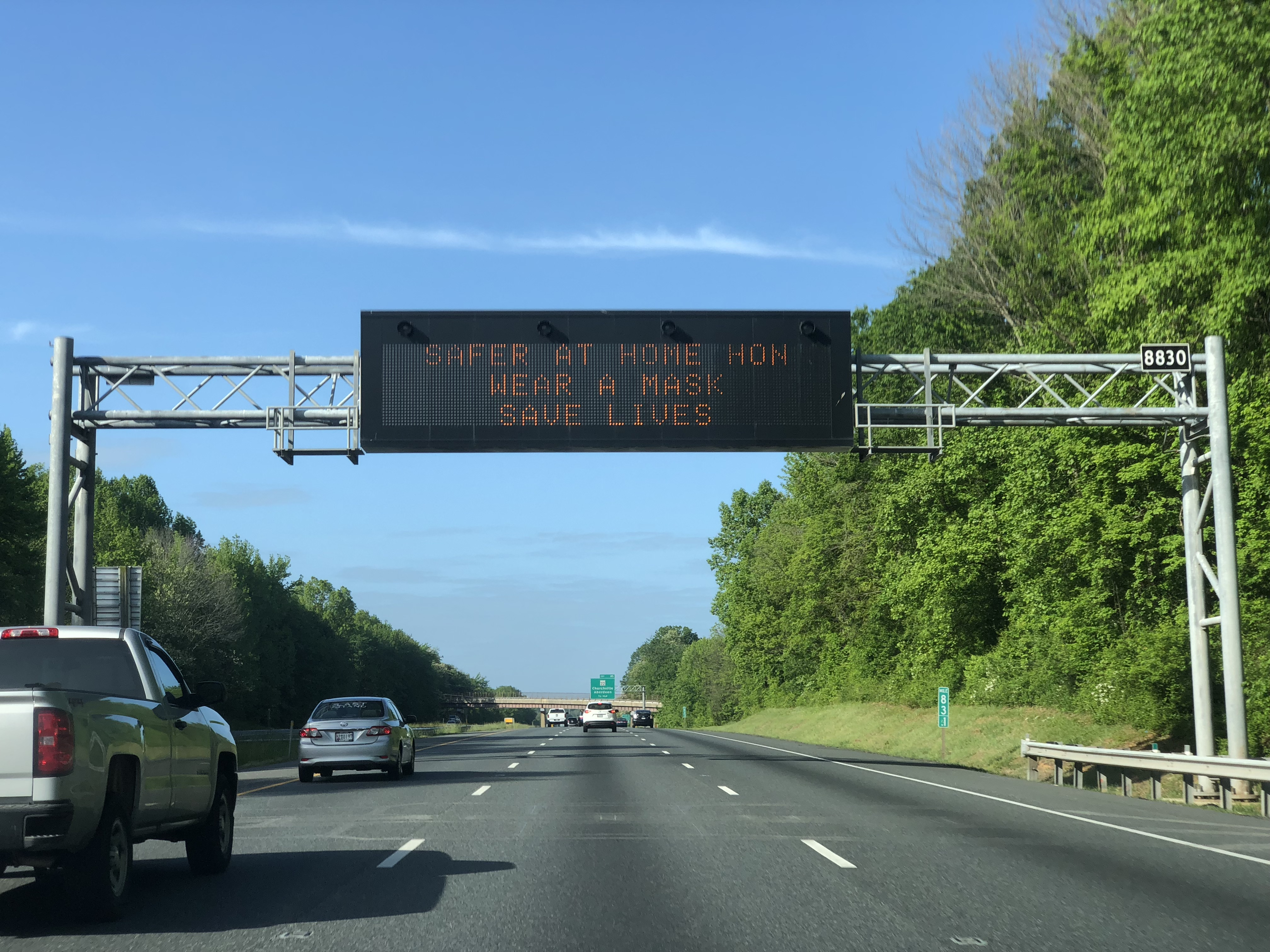
Variable-message sign along Interstate 95 in Harford County announcing the safer-at-home advisory and encouraging mask wearing

Stage 1 involves reopening activities considered low risk. Effective Friday, May 15, 2020, at 5:00 pm Hogan lifted the "stay at home" order, more than 45 days after the order was initially announced. "The fight against this deadly disease is far from over" but "Maryland and our nation can now at least begin to slowly recover," Hogan said. Although the stay at home order was lifted, the state would be moving instead toward a Safer-at-Home public health advisory. Hogan encouraged residents to practice social distancing and to continuing to wear face coverings when inside stores or on public transportation, as outlined in his previous Face Covering Order. Certain businesses reopened on May 15, including most retail establishments (at 50% capacity or less, and not enclosed shopping malls), manufacturing operations, religious facilities (at 50% capacity), personal services including barber shops and salons (at 50% capacity). All businesses opening are subject to local regulation. Gatherings larger than 10 persons remain prohibited. Restaurants, bars, fitness centers, theaters, malls, other non-essential businesses, and other recreational facilities remain closed.

Howard and Frederick counties enacted modified version of the first stage. Baltimore City, Montgomery and Prince George's Counties continued their stay-at-home restrictions. Montgomery & Prince George's Counties started stage 1 on June 1, 2020. Baltimore City did not start Stage 1 until June 8, 2020 - by which point many other places of the state were already in Stage 2.

With various counties initiating the rollout of Stage 1 in different ways and at different times. Many residents of the state were unsure what applied to where they lived. Frederick County Chamber of Commerce President and CEO Rick Weldon described the roll out of stage one as "slightly confusing."

Effective Friday, May 29, 2020, at 5:00 pm Hogan initiated the final reopenings in Stage 1. It included outdoor dining for restaurants and social organizations - such as American Legion, Elk Clubs, or VFWs. Additionally, youth sports, youth day camps, outdoor pools and drive-in movie theaters were included. Restaurants must follow all public health requirements outlined by the Centers for Disease Control and Prevention, Food and Drug Administration, and the National Restaurant Association, including things such as maintaining appropriate distance, limited seating, and proper sanitizing between customers. Limited outdoor gym and fitness classes, and limited outdoor religious gatherings were also permitted to resume.

=== Stage 2 (June 2020) ===
Stage 2 involves reopening activities considered medium risk. Effective Friday, June 5, 2020, at 5:00 pm Hogan announced the state will begin moving into Stage 2, allowing many nonessential businesses to reopen, and state agencies will return to normal operations the following Monday. Hogan said in a press conference, "Moving into Stage 2 does not mean this crisis is behind us." He still encouraged residents to continue to practice social distancing and wear face masks while inside. These lifted restrictions are still subject to local jurisdiction. At this point, Baltimore City still has the "stay at home" order in place. Montgomery and Prince George's counties also are not moving forward with Stage 2 at this time. Under this executive order large and small retail shops, specialty vendors, wholesalers, warehouses, banks, real estate offices, travel agencies, auto dealers, tattoo parlors and showrooms are all able to resume operations. However, social, community, recreational, leisure, and sporting gatherings and events of more than 10 are still prohibited. Additionally, senior centers, indoor service at restaurants and bars, fitness centers, theaters, indoor malls, and other indoor recreation such as pool halls, bowling alleys, mini golf, and social clubs must remain closed.

Effective Friday June 12, 2020, at 5:00 pm, Hogan initiated additional reopenings in Stage 2. It included indoor service at restaurants, at 50% capacity, and outdoor amusements. Effective Friday June 19, at 5:00 pm, arcades, bingo halls, bowling alleys, casinos, indoor gyms, malls, roller rinks, social clubs, and studio fitness were permitted to reopen.

=== Stage 3 (September 2020) ===
Stage 3 involves reopening activities considered high risk. This stage originally was set to require an FDA approved vaccine that was widely available, however Governor Hogan placed the state in Stage 3 effective September 4, 2020 at 5:00 pm. In Stage 3 all businesses are permitted to be open. Movie theaters and live entertainment are restricted to 50% capacity, or up to 100 people at indoor venues and 250 at outdoor venues.

Effective September 21, 2020, Hogan expanded capacity of indoor dining at restaurants from 50% to 75%.

Effective October 1, 2020, Hogan resumed permitting indoor visitation at nursing homes, as long as there is not a COVID-19 outbreak at the nursing home, and the county's positivity rate is less than 10%. Additionally, child care centers are permitted to return to their full licensed capacity.

Effective March 12, 2021, Hogan lifted capacity limits for indoor and outdoor dining, retail, religious facilities, fitness centers, personal services, and indoor recreation. In addition, Hogan expanded capacity for large indoor and outdoor venues including conference venues, wedding venues, concert venues, conventions, theaters, racing venues, and sports venues to 50%. Hogan also lifted quarantine requirements and restrictions for out-of-state travel. Some counties and municipalities continue to have restrictions in place, such as the City of Salisbury's residential gathering limit.

Effective May 15, 2021, Hogan lifted all remaining restrictions on businesses, restaurants, and other venues. He also lifted the majority of the face covering mandate, except for the requirement to wear a face covering in schools, health care settings, and public transportation per CDC guidelines.

== Vaccination timelines ==
Maryland is distributing the vaccines using a phased approach, based on relative risk of exposure or developing serious illness.

- Phase 1A: Health care workers; Residents and staff of nursing homes; First responders, public safety, corrections. (Phase 1A began in mid-late December 2020.)
- Phase 1B: Assisted living, independent living, behavioral health and developmentally disabled group homes, and other congregate facilities; Adults age 75 and older; Education and childcare; and continuity of government. (The state entered Phase 1B on January 18, 2021.)
- Phase 1C: Adults age 65–74; Essential workers in lab services, food and agriculture, manufacturing, postal service, public transit, and grocery workers. (The state entered Phase 1C on January 25, 2021.)
- Phase 2A: Adults age 60–64. (The state entered Phase 2A on March 23, 2021.)
- Phase 2B: Ages 16+ at increased risk of severe COVID-19 illness due to comorbidities. (The state entered Phase 2B on March 30, 2021.)
- Phase 2C: Essential workers in critical utilities, transportation, finance, IT, food service, etc. (The state entered Phase 2C on April 13, 2021.)
- Phase 3: General population aged 16 and older (The state entered Phase 3 on April 19, 2021.)

== Government response ==
=== Primary and secondary schools ===
==== 2019-2020 school year ====
On March 12, 2020, Karen Salmon, Superintendent of the Maryland State Department of Education, announced that all Maryland public schools were to be closed from March 16 through March 27, 2020. Superintendent Salmon announced on March 25, 2020, an extended four-week closure, until April 24; Governor Hogan added that the additional four-week closure was "somewhat aspirational" and they would reassess the situation in that time. On April 17, 2020, Superintendent Salmon, after consultation with the State Board of Education and public health experts, extended the closure of Maryland public schools through May 15. On May 6, 2020, Superintendent Salmon announced that schools would remain closed for the remainder of the 2019–20 academic school year.

==== 2020-2021 school year ====
The Maryland State Department of Education granted authority to the individual county Boards of Education to develop a recovery plan consistent with the state's Maryland Together: Maryland's Recovery Plan for Education. Counties were required to complete and post to their websites a recovery plan by August 14, 2020. The plans must include various requirements, such as equity in instruction, stakeholder groups, and standards. Many boards developed a three-stage plan, with stage one being remote learning, stage two a hybrid of remote and in-class, and stage three a full return to class. Harford County Public Schools began the school year in the remote stage with "Learning Resource Centers" as a place for children needing supervision during the day to receive it, along with internet access and breakfast and lunch. The Maryland Public Secondary Schools Athletic Association postponed the fall and winter 2020 sports seasons.

On August 27, 2020, Governor Larry Hogan announced that all schools in Maryland can safely reopen. "I am announcing that as a result of our improved health metrics, every single county school system in the state of Maryland is now fully authorized to begin safely reopening," Hogan said. Superintendent of Schools Dr. Karen Salmon said she strongly encourages local school systems to reevaluate their mode of instruction at the end of the first quarter, and that the State of Maryland has $10 million in grant funding available to help systems that are able to move toward in-person instruction. Maryland School Superintendents had been requesting guidelines for reopening from Dr. Salmon, since June. The Public School Superintendents' Association of Maryland President, Talbot County Superintendent Kelly Griffith, said "The governor's health metrics and guidelines for reopening schools come far too late in the process of planning for the coming school year, which begins Sept. 8. Every school system was required to submit its plans for instruction for the coming months by Aug. 14, and school districts had already made a decision to go online."

On September 24, 2020, Governor Hogan announced that fall sports were authorized to resume on October 7.

Many school districts in Maryland opened in a virtual mode, shifting some or all grade levels to hybrid in late September to mid-October, 2020. All districts reverted to virtual by early December 2020 due to the spike in COVID-19 cases.

Maryland Public School Districts 2020 Hybrid Instruction
County	Date Hybrid Instruction Began	Date Hybrid Instruction Ended	References
Allegany	October 5, 2020	November 9, 2020	
Anne Arundel	Virtual		
Baltimore City	Virtual		
Baltimore	Virtual		
Calvert	November 9, 2020	November 19, 2020	
Caroline	October 5, 2020	November 23, 2020	
Carroll	October 19, 2020	November 19, 2020	
Cecil	October 12, 2020	November 15, 2020	
Charles	Virtual		
Dorchester	October 2, 2020	October 22, 2020	
Frederick	Virtual		
Garrett	September 8, 2020	November 12, 2020	
Harford	October 19, 2020	November 13, 2020	
Howard	Virtual		
Kent	September 28, 2020	December 7, 2020	
Montgomery	Virtual		
Prince George's	Virtual		
Queen Anne's	Virtual		
St. Mary's	October 5, 2020	November 16, 2020	
Somerset	October 5, 2020	November 9, 2020	
Talbot	October 12, 2020	November 19, 2020	
Washington	October 12, 2020	November 16, 2020	
Wicomico	October 19, 2020	November 18, 2020	
Worcester	September 28, 2020	November 16, 2020	

After the holiday break, some school systems, such as Worcester County, originally planned to return to hybrid instruction despite health metrics exceeding state recommendations. However, on the Sunday prior to in-person instruction resuming, the local health department asked the school system not to open.

On January 21, Governor Larry Hogan and State Superintendent of Schools Dr. Karen Salmon called on all Maryland school systems to return to hybrid instruction—a combination of in-person and virtual learning—no later than Monday, March 1. State health officials provided school systems with Maryland School Reopening Guidance.

==== 2021-2022 school year ====
Many county public school districts, such as Howard County, Baltimore County, and Wicomico County are requiring face coverings for all students, teachers, and staff when they return in the fall, as recommended by the Centers for Disease Control and Prevention, Maryland Department of Health, and local health departments. On August 26, 2021, the Maryland State Department of Education voted to require universal face coverings at all schools, after State School Superintendent Mohammed Choudhury said he supported universal face coverings two days prior. Universal face coverings was discontinued, on February 25, 2022, by the Maryland State Department of Education, after approval by the General Assembly's Joint Committee on Administrative, Executive and Legislative Review.

==== 2023-2024 school year ====
On September 5, 2023, Rosemary Hills Elementary School in Silver Spring imposed a temporary policy requiring students to wear KN95 respirators on campus, after "multiple students" reportedly tested positive for COVID-19.

=== Colleges and universities ===
==== 2020-2021 school year ====
Many schools in the University System of Maryland opened for the 2020–2021 school year allowing remote and in-person instruction. On August 16, 2020, Towson University temporarily switched all classes to remote due to positive tests conducted on campus, and on August 26 moved the remainder of the fall semester to remote instruction, closing resident halls. The University of Maryland, College Park began the fall semester on August 31, 2020, remotely, and started in-person classes on September 14.

=== Libraries ===
By Mid-March 2020, all 24 public library systems in the state had closed, and remained closed for at least two months. The first library to reopen was Ruth Enlow Library of Garrett County, on May 18, 2020, with curbside service. On June 15, 2020, the Enoch Pratt Public Library system in Baltimore started sidewalk services. Equipment was installed to boost wi-fi signals outside of the library at eight locations to start offering drive-in wifi. By August 3, 2020, all libraries had reopened for curbside service.

Libraries started opening for indoor service, with Ruth Enlow Library and Somerset County Library being the first, on June 22, 2020. Anne Arundel County Public Library reopened its building to the public on July 6, 2020, but closed again on August 13 after library staff "documented hundreds of instances of customers failing to wear face coverings or follow social distancing protocols."

== Public health response ==
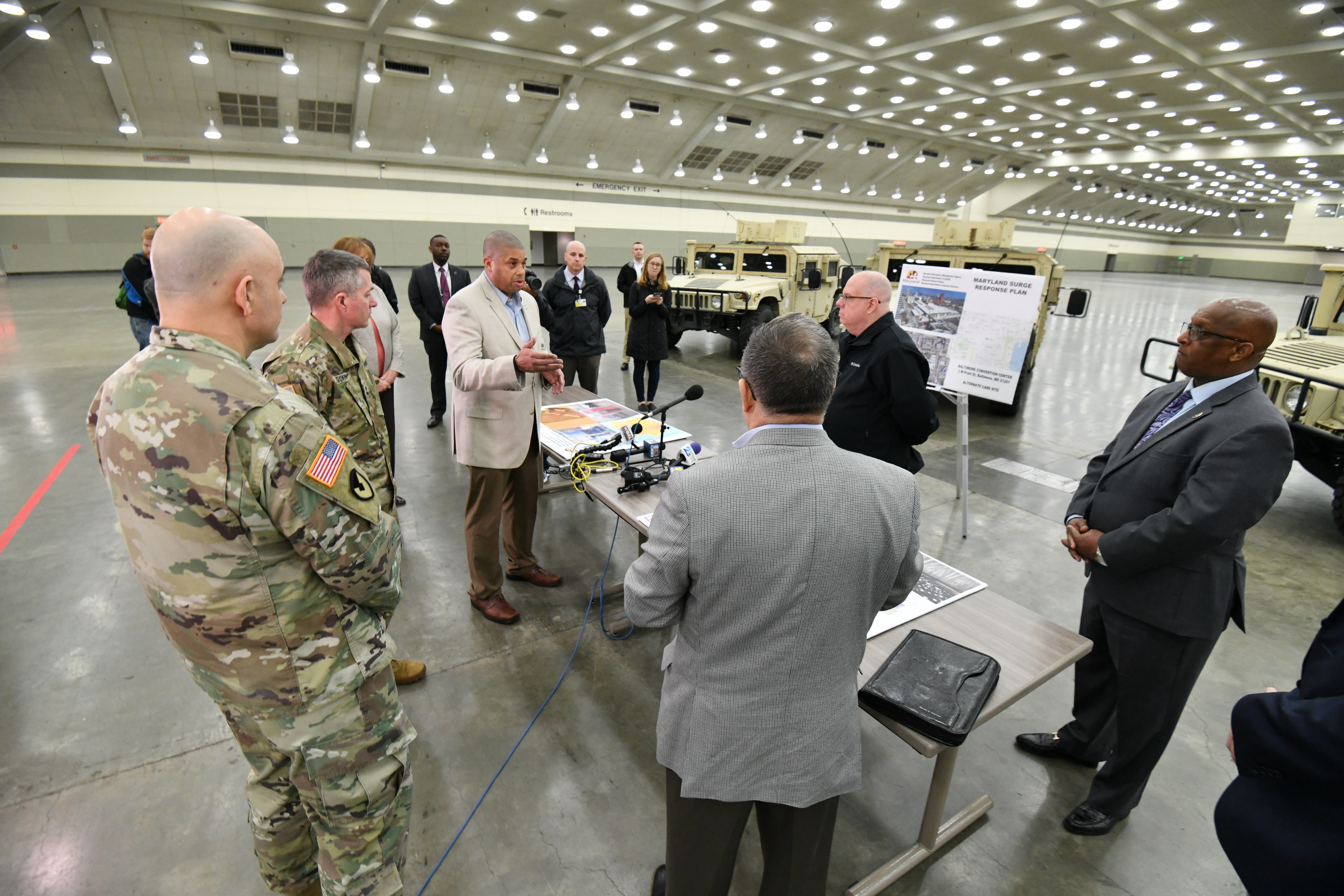
Larry Hogan and Jack Young discussing the construction of the new hospital with the USACE

On Monday, March 23, 2020, Larry Hogan announced that the Baltimore Convention Center and adjacent city owned Hilton, in partnership with Johns Hopkins Hospital and the University of Maryland Medical System, would become a makeshift hospital. Approximately 100,000 of the 300,000 square foot convention center would be used for 250 additional beds and could expand up to 750 in an effort to increase the statewide hospital capacity by an additional 6,000 beds.

Peninsula Regional Medical Center, in Salisbury, expanded capacity through converting a conference space into a fully equipped 43-bed intensive care unit. In addition, PRMC received a 20-bed inflatable hospital from the Delmarva Regional Healthcare Mutual Aid Group. In late April, 2020, Salisbury University and PRMC partnered to provide space for 100 individuals recovering from COVID-19 in vacant student housing, allowing those individuals to complete their 14-day quarantine outside the hospital setting.

== Effects on 2020 elections ==
=== Primary election ===
Governor Hogan announced an executive order on March 17, 2020, that the Maryland primary elections would be postponed. Scheduled to be held April 28, until June 2, with early voting changed to May 21 through May 28. Maryland became the fifth state in the country after Louisiana, Kentucky, Ohio, and Georgia to postpone primary elections. The state sent 4 million mail-in ballots and having limited in-person voting for the June 2 primary election.

Although standard primary elections were postponed, the governor stated that the state's 7th Congressional District's special election, to fill the seat of former Representative Elijah Cummings, would remain on April 28, 2020, citing that it was "imperative that the people of the 7th Congressional District have a voice in the House of Representatives and that Maryland has a full delegation representing our state in Congress." The special election was done through mail-in voting only. Democrat Kweisi Mfume won the special election, it's a seat he held for 10 years prior to serving as President of the NAACP.

=== General election ===
Governor Hogan directed the Maryland Board of Elections to hold the general election as normally permitted under state law, with no additional executive orders to expand mail-in voting. Hogan ordered that all early voting and polling centers would be open and an absentee ballot application would be mailed to all eligible voters, however an absentee ballot would not be mailed automatically like was the case with the primary election.

== Impact on sports ==
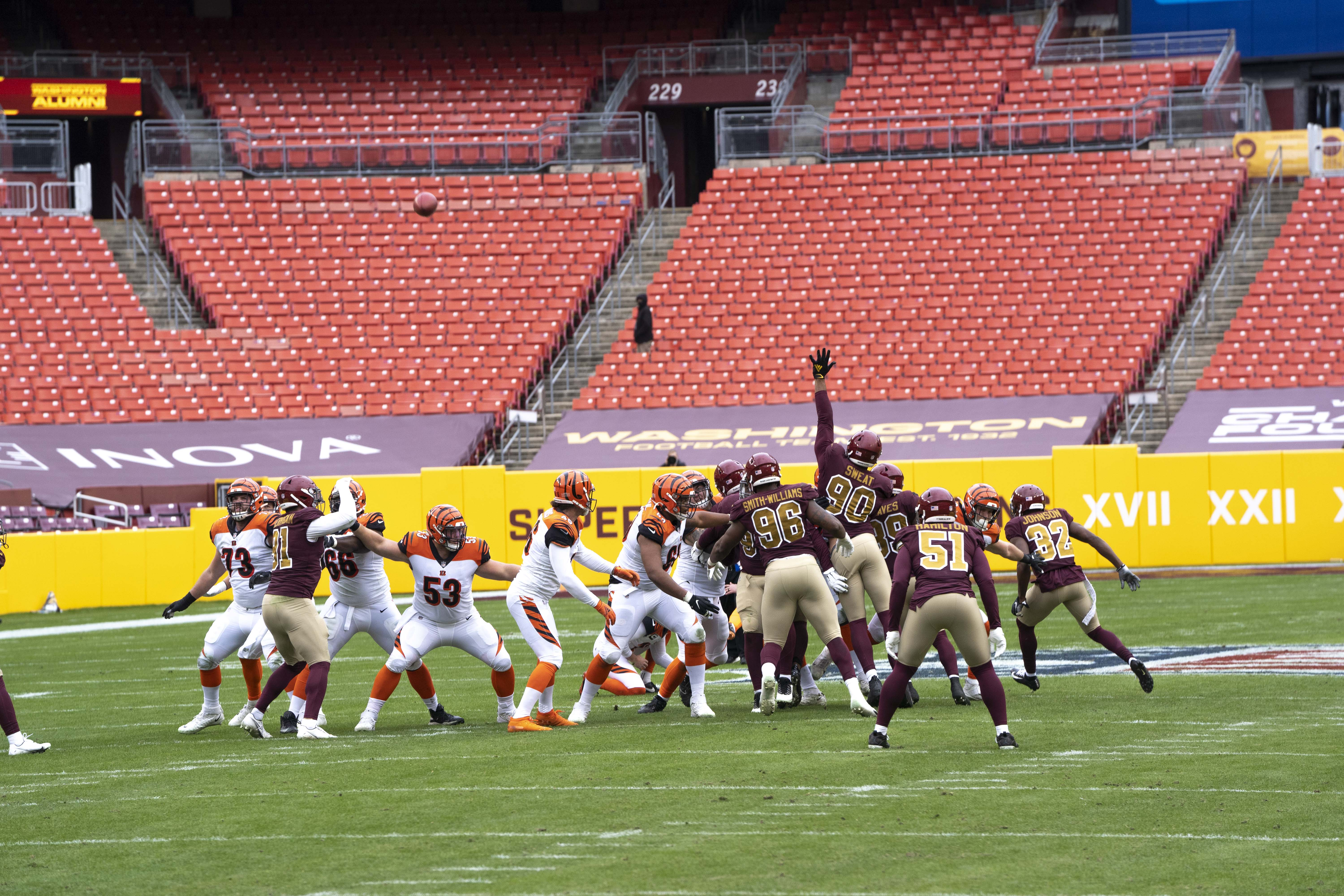
NFL game between the Washington Football Team and the Cincinnati Bengals at FedExField in Landover without fans in attendance

In March 2020, Major League Baseball canceled the remainder of spring training, and on March 16, 2020, they announced that the season will be postponed indefinitely, after the recommendations from the CDC to restrict events of more than 50 people for the next eight weeks, affecting the Baltimore Orioles. On June 24, 2020, it was announced that the 2020 season of 60 games will begin July 23 and 24 with players returning to spring training on July 1. On June 30, 2020, it was announced that the 2020 Minor League Baseball season would not be played, affecting teams like the Delmarva Shorebirds, who now plan to transition the stadium into a community entertainment center for the remainder of the year.

In college sports, the National Collegiate Athletic Association canceled all winter and spring tournaments, most notably the Division I men's and women's basketball tournaments, affecting colleges and universities statewide. On March 16, 2020, the National Junior College Athletic Association also canceled the remainder of the winter seasons as well as the spring seasons. The 2020 Preakness Stakes were postponed until after Labor Day.

== See also ==
- COVID-19 pandemic in Virginia – for impact on Virginia counties in the Washington metropolitan area
- COVID-19 pandemic in Washington, D.C. – for impact on the District of Columbia
- Timeline of the COVID-19 pandemic in the United States
- COVID-19 pandemic in the United States – for impact on the country
- COVID-19 pandemic – for impact on other countries
- Shortages related to the COVID-19 pandemic
