= COVID-19 pandemic in Washington =

COVID-19 pandemic in Washington may refer to:

- COVID-19 pandemic in Washington (state)
- COVID-19 pandemic in Washington, D.C.
