= COVID-19 pandemic in Virginia =

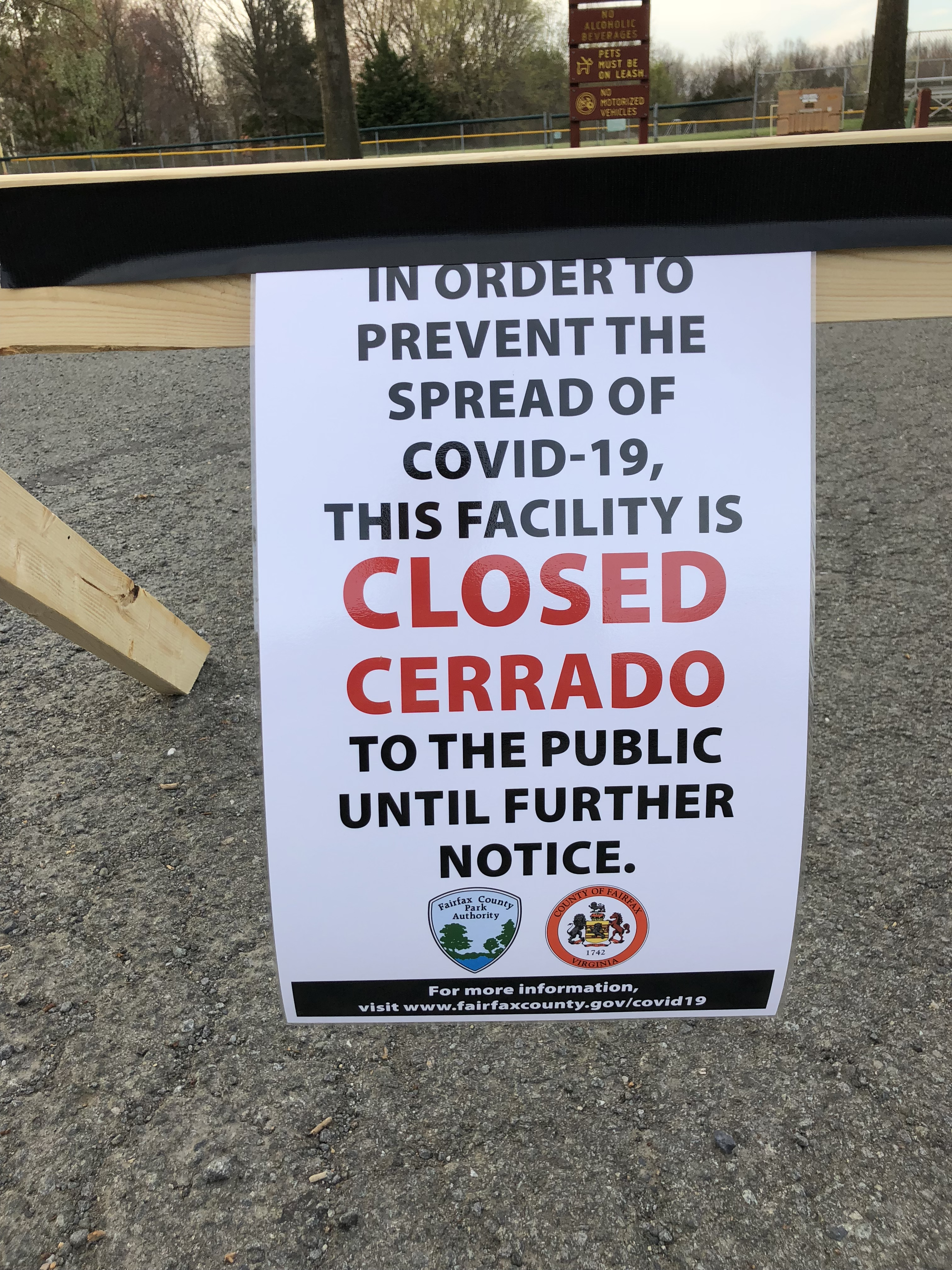
- Fairfax County Park Authority in Fairfax County closed March 24, 2020

- Map of the outbreak in Virginia by confirmed new infections per 100,000 people over 14 days (last updated March 2021) 1,000+ 500–1,000 200–500 100–200 50–100 20–50 10–20 0–10 No confirmed new cases or no/bad data

- Map of the outbreak in Virginia by confirmed total infections per 100,000 people (last updated March 2021) 10,000+ 3,000–10,000 1,000–3,000 300–1,000 100–300 30–100 0–30 No confirmed infected or no data
- Disease: COVID-19
- Pathogen: SARS-CoV-2
- Location: Virginia, U.S.
- First outbreak: Wuhan, Hubei, China
- Index case: Fort Belvoir
- Arrival date: February 23, 2020 (found March 7, 2020)
- Confirmed cases: 677,013
- Active cases: 3,254
- Hospitalized cases: 331 (current)
- Critical cases: 121 (current)
- Ventilator cases: 71 (current)
- Recovered: 662,506 (estimate); 56,678 (previously hospitalized)
- Deaths: 20,187
- Fatality rate: 1.69%

Government website
- www.vdh.virginia.gov/coronavirus/

The COVID-19 pandemic in Virginia began when the first confirmed case was reported on March 7, 2020, in Fort Belvoir, and the first suspected case arrived in Virginia on February 23, 2020, which was a man who had recently traveled to Egypt. In response to the spread of COVID-19, the state mandated a stay at home order from March 18, 2020, until May 12, 2020, when the state began a four-phased reopening plan that lasted through July 1, 2020. From May 31, 2020, until May 28, 2021, the state enforced a mask mandate, being one of the first states in the nation to enforce a statewide mask mandate which was to stop the spread of the disease. The state remained relatively stagnant in COVID-19 cases through November 2020, until there was a large surge in COVID-19 cases during the winter of 2020–21, as part of a nationwide surge in cases. Cases gradually subsided to summer and fall 2020 numbers by March 2021, with numbers falling to early pandemic numbers by June 2021.

On December 14, 2020, the state began a mass vaccination effort as part of the country's larger COVID-19 vaccine campaign. In January 2021, the state imposed a four-phase plan to prioritize what individuals by profession and age group would be eligible to receive the vaccine. On April 18, 2021, the entire population became eligible for the vaccine. By May 10, 2021, half of the state received at least COVID-19 vaccine.

As of June 1, 2021, the Virginia Department of Health reported 675,538 positive cases and 11,186 deaths in the U.S. state of Virginia (officially known as the Commonwealth of Virginia).

As of June 5, 2022, Virginia has administered 16,858,301 COVID-19 vaccine doses, and has fully vaccinated 6,334,662 people, equivalent to 74.93% of the population.

On February 13, 2025, the Virginia State Health Commissioner signed a variance officially ending the requirement for clinicians to report individual suspected or confirmed cases of COVID-19. As the disease reached an endemic stage, the Virginia Department of Health (VDH) transitioned to monitoring aggregate data, such as hospitalizations, emergency department visits, and wastewater surveillance, aligning with the surveillance methods used for other endemic respiratory viruses.

== Timeline ==
=== March 2020 ===
==== March 7–12 ====
On March 7, Virginia confirmed its first case, a US Marine assigned to Fort Belvoir. He had recently traveled abroad. On March 8, the state reported its second presumptive positive case, an 80-year-old man from Fairfax who had recently returned from a cruise on the Nile River.

On March 9, the state reported 3 more presumptive positive cases: a man in his mid 60s from Arlington County who had recently travelled internationally, a woman from Fairfax City who is the spouse of the patient reported the day before, and a Spotsylvania County resident. This brings the total number of cases in the state to 5. On March 10, health officials in Loudoun County announced that a county resident tested presumptive positive for coronavirus. During the same day, a Virginia Beach couple who traveled on a Nile River cruise was tested presumed positive, becoming the first two cases for Hampton Roads, bringing the state's total to eight.

On March 10, Fairfax County Public Schools announced that they would close on March 13 and March 16 to begin the transition to online classes if the school system would need to shut down. On March 15, it was announced that all schools and school administration buildings in Fairfax County would close until April 10.

On March 11, the University of Virginia in Charlottesville announced that classes will be moved online beginning on March 19 "for the foreseeable future, quite possibly through the end of the semester." Furthermore, administrators issued a blanket prohibition on "events with more than 100 people," saying that such events "should be postponed, cancelled, or offered virtually." The closure followed closely on the heels of the first confirmed case of coronavirus in Central Virginia in a teenager from Hanover County near Richmond who returned from international travel "to a country...[with] a Level 3 alert" on March 8. The teenager was reported to be "doing well" in isolation at home, and Hanover County Public Schools confirmed that the teenager is not a current student attending a public school in that county.

On March 12, Governor Ralph S. Northam declared a state of emergency and cancelled out-of-state travel for public employees, after the state's total cases doubled since the last update. The declaration activated the Virginia Emergency Operations Center, banned price gouging, activated the Virginia National Guard to State Active duty, and authorized $10,000,000 to be used for any recovery and/or response efforts in the state due to the coronavirus. Northam stated that local school districts were allowed to make their own decisions about closing schools. Several public school districts, including Loudoun County, Prince William County, Stafford County, and Fairfax County suspended classes.

==== March 13–16 ====
Several jurisdictions declared local states of emergency throughout March. The Code of Virginia permits officials of local jurisdictions that have issued declarations of local emergencies to, among other things, "control, restrict, allocate or regulate the use, sale, production and distribution of food, fuel, clothing and other commodities, materials, goods, services and resource systems which fall only within the boundaries of that jurisdiction and which do not impact systems affecting adjoining or other political subdivisions" without being under the supervision and control of the Governor. Local emergencies were declared in Arlington County and Madison County on March 13; Alexandria and Stephens City on March 14; Prince William County, Loudoun County, Fauquier County, Stafford County, Falls Church, Fredericksburg, and Purcellville on March 16.

On March 13, the state's total cases increased by 13, raising the total sum of confirmed cases to 30. Governor Ralph Northam suspended all K–12 schools in the state for a minimum of two weeks.

On the evening of March 14, the Virginia Department of Health announced the number of positive cases had increased to 41. They also announced the state's first death from the coronavirus: a man in his 70s who died of respiratory failure. The county where the man died was not released, but it was announced he was from the Peninsula Health District. The same day, the College of William & Mary announced that a member of staff had tested positive for the disease.

On March 15, the Virginia Department of Health announced the number of positive cases had increased to 45, Fairfax County has the most cases among Virginia's counties with 10 confirmed cases.

On March 16, the University of Virginia confirmed its first case, a member of staff in her late 50s. The Virginia Department of Health announced an additional six positive cases of coronavirus in the state, as well as the state's second death. The man who died was in his 70s from the Peninsula region and died of respiratory failure. These cases increased the number of positive cases to 51.

==== March 17–22 ====
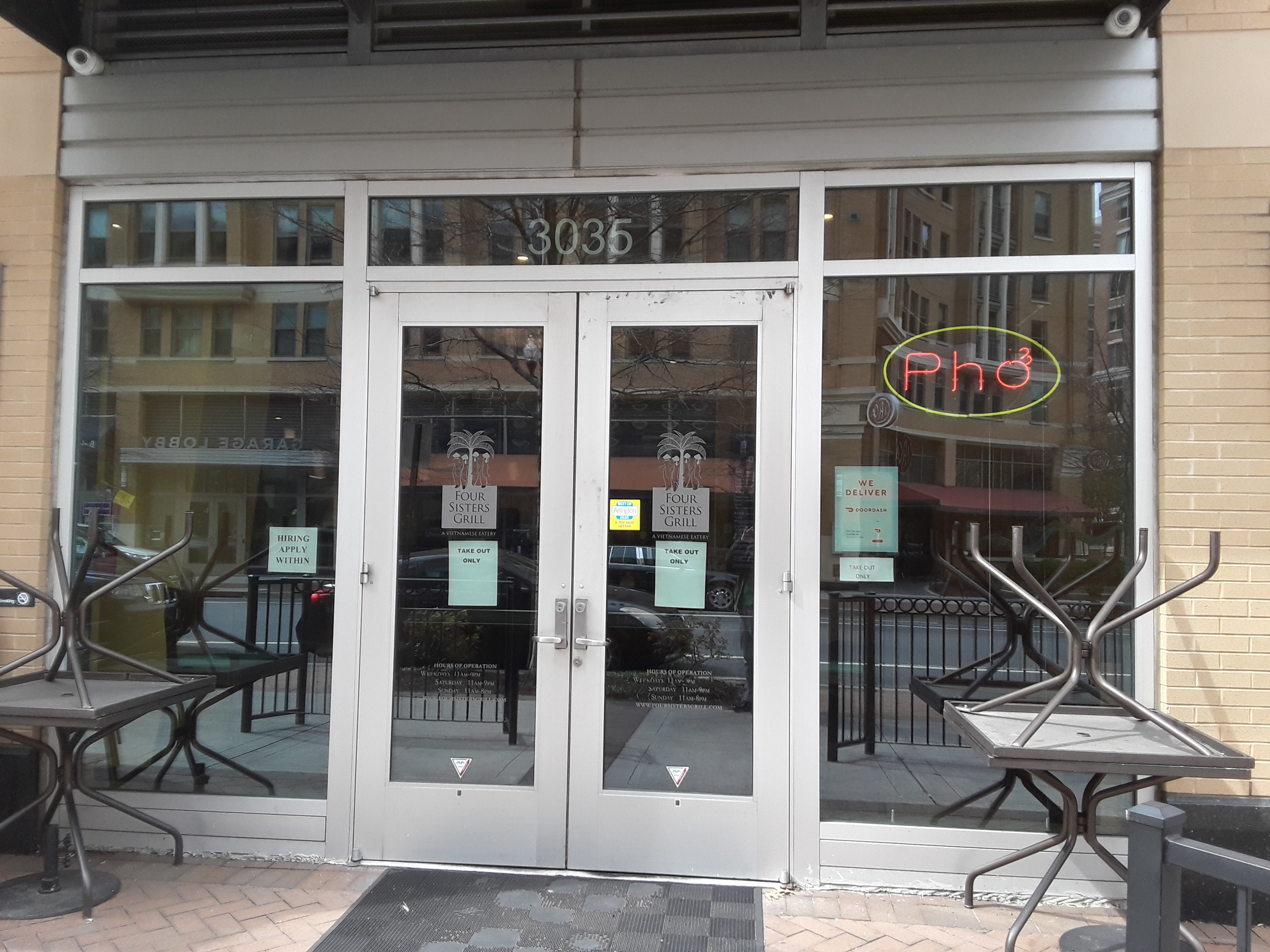
A restaurant in Clarendon, Arlington, Virginia offering only take-out options on March 18, 2020.

Local emergencies were declared in Fairfax County, Rappahannock County, Spotsylvania County, Clarke County, Culpeper County, Warren County, Page County, Shenandoah County, the City of Fairfax, Manassas City, and Winchester on March 17; Leesburg on March 18; and Frederick County on March 19.

During the afternoon of March 17, Governor Northam issued an order allowing law enforcement to enforce a ban on gatherings of more than 10 people in public spaces; earlier in the day, he had appeared unwilling to take such measures. Some restaurant owners had previously expressed dissatisfaction with the lack of direction provided by the government.

On March 19, Virginia officials asked law enforcement to avoid arrests where possible. The administration also asked magistrates and judges to consider alternatives to incarceration. On March 19, Virginia reported its first coronavirus case in a minor, a child under the age of 10 in Gloucester County.

On March 20, Governor Northam activated the Virginia National Guard and elements of the Virginia Defense Force. The state announced they have 114 cases of COVID-19, with 20 hospitalizations.

==== March 23 ====
On March 23, Northam issued an order that banned within Virginia all gatherings of more than 10 people. The order required all public schools to be closed for the remainder of the current school year. The order also closed all public access to recreational and entertainment businesses, such as bowling alleys, gyms, and theaters.

The March 23 order closed "dining and congregation areas" in restaurants, dining establishments, food courts, farmers markets, breweries, microbreweries, distilleries, wineries and tasting rooms, but left open all other areas in those types of businesses. The order also left open certain specified "essential retail businesses" including pharmacies, grocery stores, and banks (among others). On March 26, an Alexandria pub — that a COVID-19 positive person had visited on March 10, March 14, and March 15 — reportedly said on its Facebook page that it was closed only through March 28 for cleaning and sanitizing.

The March 23 order stated that all "essential" retail establishments must, to the extent possible, adhere to social distancing recommendations, enhanced sanitizing practices on common surfaces, and other appropriate workplace guidance from state and federal authorities. The order also stated that any brick-and-mortar retail business not listed in the order as "essential" must limit all in-person shopping to no more than 10 patrons per establishment, adhere to social distancing recommendations, sanitize common surfaces, and apply relevant workplace guidance from state and federal authorities. The order stated that if any such business cannot adhere to the 10-patron limit with proper social distancing requirements, it must close.

Northam's March 23 order did not define construction activity as being "essential". However, the Washington Post reported on March 28 that the District of Columbia, Maryland and Virginia had designated construction as well as several other types of businesses as essential. The Post reported that construction projects were still underway in those jurisdictions and that a spokesperson for Northam had claimed that the federal government had determined that construction is essential. The Post also reported that the State of Washington's transportation department had suspended work on nearly all of its projects and that Washington's governor had clarified his stay-at-home order to state that construction was not considered an essential activity.

On March 23, Governor Northam closed all public and private schools until the end of the academic year. Jerry Falwell Jr. announced that Liberty University was reopening its dorms to students who wished to return to campus from spring break even though classes were being taught online. University staff and faculty have also been told to report to work. Both decisions remain controversial.

A local emergency was declared in Front Royal on March 23.

==== March 24–31 ====
On March 25, Northam and the State Health Commissioner issued a public health emergency order that prohibited inpatient and outpatient surgical hospitals, free-standing endoscopy centers, physicians' offices, and dental, orthodontic, and endodontic offices from providing procedures and surgeries that require personal protective equipment (PPE), which if delayed, are not anticipated to cause harm to the patient by negatively affecting the patient's health outcomes, or leading to disability or death. The prohibition did not include outpatient visits delivered in hospital-based clinics.

The United States Department of Homeland Security's March 28 guidance on essential critical infrastructure lists as "essential" the construction of residential/shelter facilities and services (see "essential services"), energy-related facilities, communications and information technology, public works including the construction of critical or strategic infrastructure and infrastructure that is temporarily required to support COVID-19 response, is for certain other types of community- or government-based operations, or is otherwise critical, strategic, or essential. The guidance does not contain any such listings for other types of construction.

During the afternoon of March 30, Governor Northam issued a stay-at-home order, to be effective until June 10 unless amended or rescinded by a further executive order. The order required everyone to remain at their place of residence, with certain specified exceptions (including traveling to work, to obtain food and for outdoor exercise). Maryland's Governor Larry Hogan and the District of Columbia's Mayor Muriel Bowser issued similar orders on the same day (see COVID-19 pandemic in Maryland and in Washington, D.C.).

=== April 2020 ===
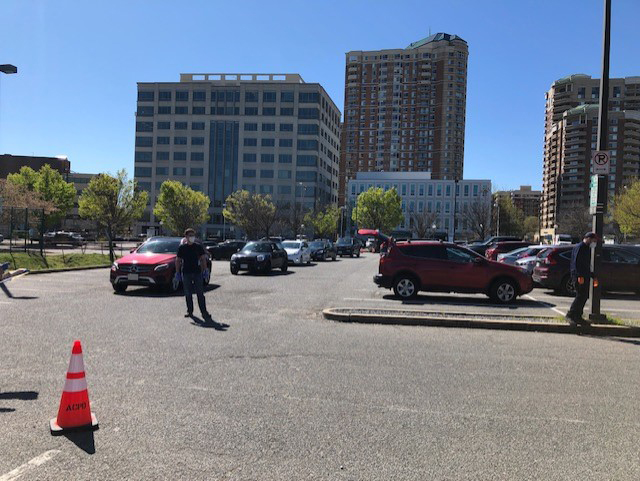
Cars line up at a drive-thru donation site in Arlington, Virginia on April 3, 2020.

On April 3, Governor Northam announced that the Dulles Expo Center will be the interim site of the first field hospital in Northern Virginia. A total of three field hospitals are expected to open throughout the Commonwealth. The Dulles Expo site is expected to be operational by mid-May.

On April 10, the Institute for Health Metrics and Evaluation at the University of Washington in Seattle reported that Virginia had not implemented a closure of non-essential services. The Institute further reported that Maryland and the District of Columbia had implemented these closures on March 23 and March 25, respectively.

On Monday April 13, Reuters reported that 42 of the 154 COVID-19 deaths in Virginia occurred at the Canterbury Rehabilitation & Healthcare Center in Henrico County, a nursing home located near Richmond. The outbreak is one of the worst coronavirus disease clusters in the United States.

On April 15, the March 13 order, which would initially expire on April 23, was extended to end on May 8. The order for all residents to stay-at-home until June 10 was still in place.

On April 16, demonstrators gathered in Richmond's Capitol Square in front of the Executive Mansion to protest Northam's closure and stay at home orders. On April 24, Northam presented a four-staged "Forward Virginia" blueprint informed by "diverse health and business stakeholders" to "safely" ease public health restrictions related to the spread of COVID-19.

=== May 2020 ===
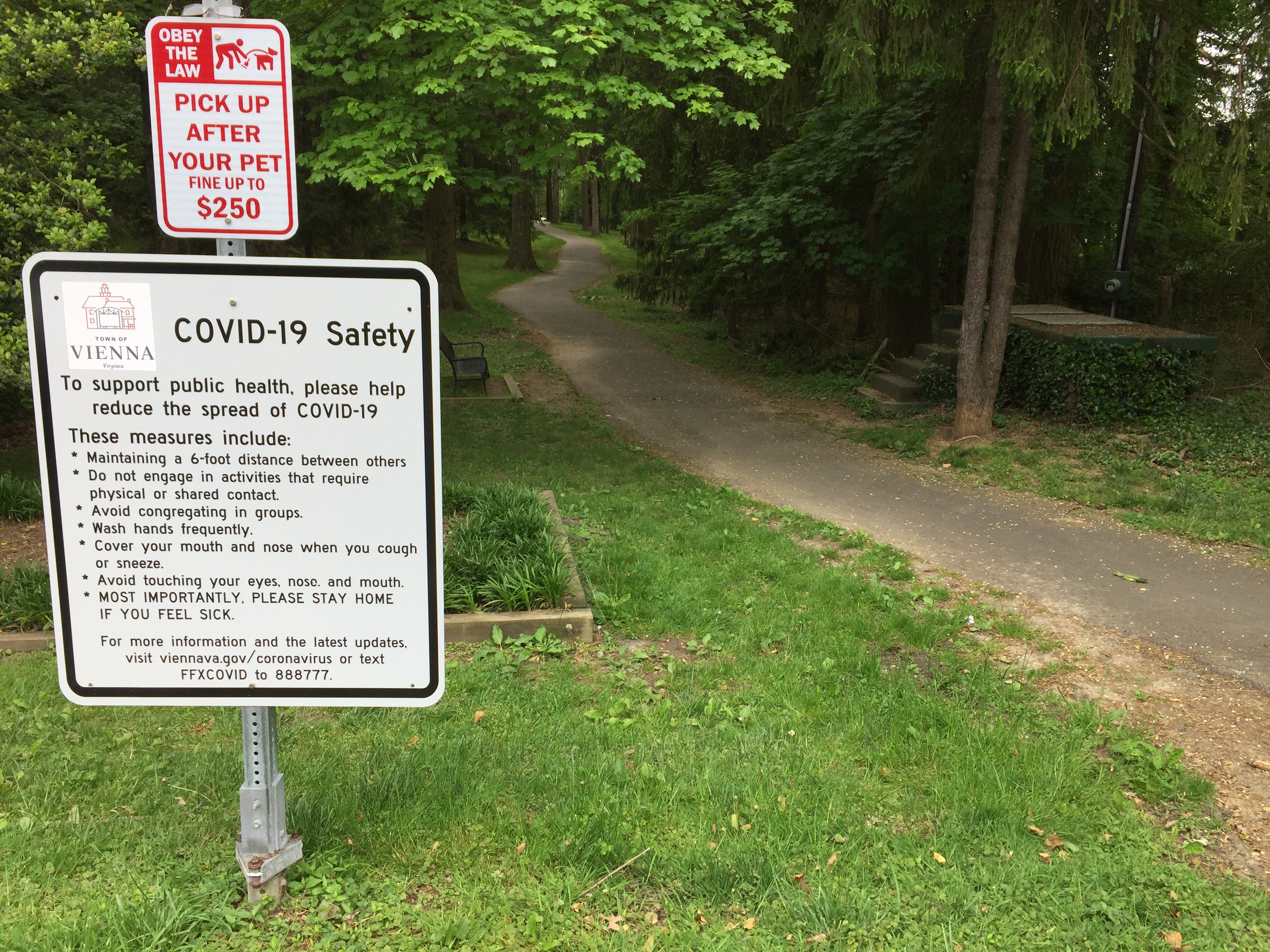
A metal COVID-19 sign at a park in Vienna, Virginia in May 2020

Phase I of Virginia's reopening began on May 15 for most of the state. Phase I was delayed until May 29 in Northern Virginia (specifically Arlington, Fairfax, Loudoun, and Prince William Counties, and the cities of Alexandria, Fairfax, Falls Church, Manassas, and Manassas Park), as well as Richmond and Accomack County.

On May 20, Mountain Mission School in Grundy reported 17 cases.

On May 29, wearing of facial coverings in buildings open for business became mandatory by Executive Order 63 which was signed by the Governor. The order is by authority granted to the Governor by Article V of the Constitution and vested in the State Health Commissioner pursuant to the Code of Virginia until it is either amended or rescinded by a subsequent executive order. The order allows exceptions including health or medical reasons for which wearing a mask is contraindicated. The order has been criticized for its deliberately ambiguous wording which mandates facial coverings but allows full discretion of a patron on how to define a "health or medical" exception. It further holds that a patron is neither required to show proof nor declare verbally what health or medical condition applies to his decision for going without a facial covering. The spokesman for the Governor's Office stated that while the ability to enforce the order is flawed, it is hoped and expected that Virginians will comply with the order.

=== June–August 2020 ===
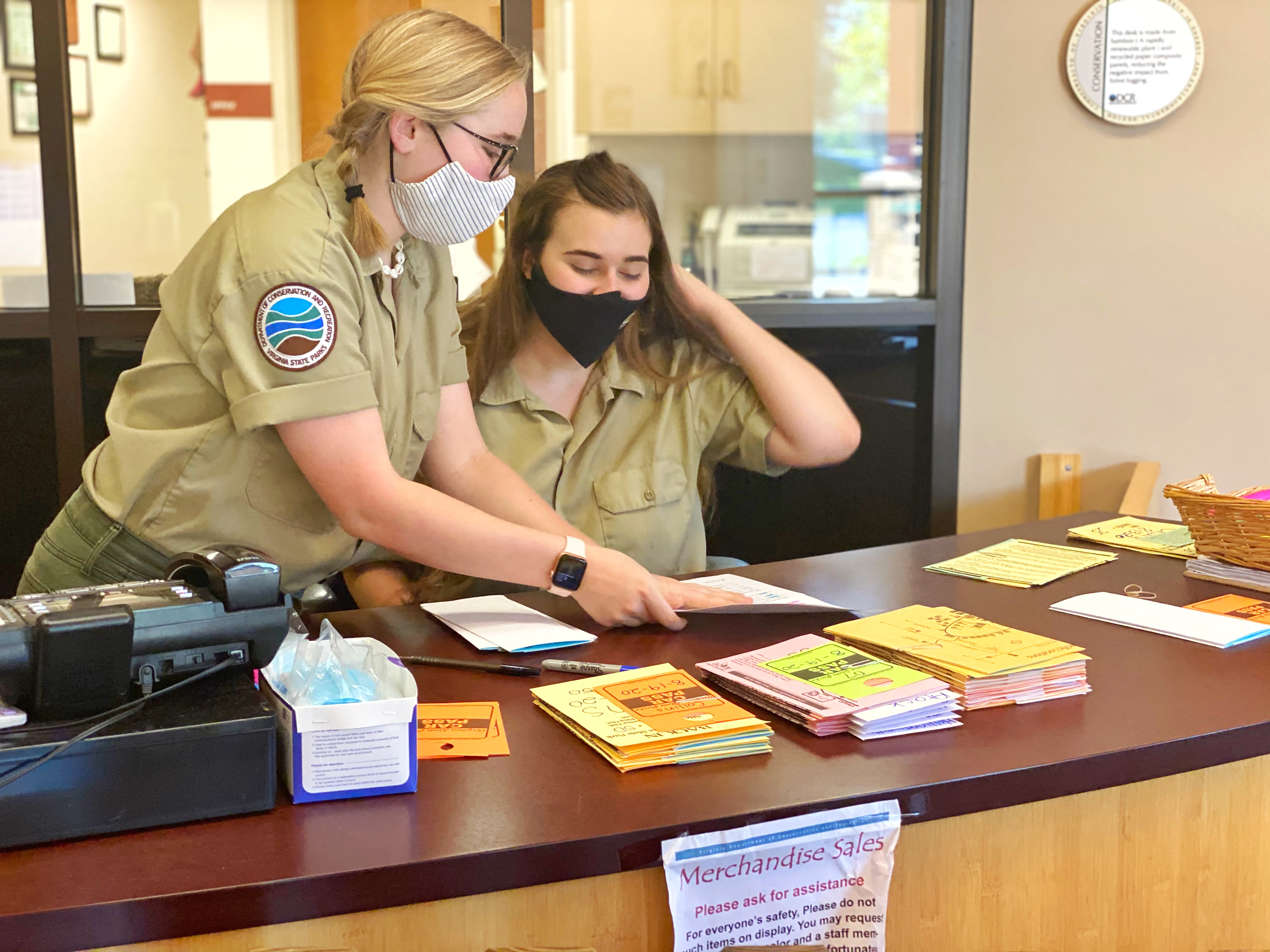
Virginia State Parks staff at Sky Meadows State Park wearing masks while working on August 11, 2020.

All of Virginia entered Phase II on June 12, and Phase III on July 1.

On July 15, the Virginia Department of Labor and Industry adopted binding safety regulations on COVID-19, the first such regulations in the United States. The regulations include mandates about control measures and prohibits retaliation against workers for expressing concern about infection risk, and provides for fines of up to US$130,000 for companies found in violation.

On July 28, additional restrictions were imposed on restaurants and bars in the Hampton Roads area of southeastern Virginia (specifically Virginia Beach, Norfolk, Portsmouth, Chesapeake, Suffolk, Hampton, Newport News, Poquoson, York County, James City County, and Williamsburg). The restrictions were expected to be in force for 2–3 weeks before being reevaluated.

On July 31, the Arlington County Board adopted during a closed session an emergency ordinance that prohibited groups of more than three people from congregating on posted streets and sidewalks. The ordinance required pedestrians to maintain at least six feet of separation from others on those streets and sidewalks. People violating the ordinance could receive fines of up to $100.

By August 11, there were 15 outbreaks of COVID-19 at poultry- and meat-processing plants in Virginia. These resulted in a total of 1,224 confirmed cases, 49 hospitalizations, and 10 deaths.

On August 29, the Arlington County government announced that County police would begin enforcing its July 31 emergency ordinance that had prohibited groups of more than three people from congregating on posted streets and sidewalks. People who refused to comply when on posted sidewalks in such commercial areas as Clarendon and Crystal City could receive fines up to $100.

=== September 2020 ===
On September 1, Governor Northam expressed concern about Southwestern Virginia, which was reporting 229 new cases each day and does not have a large number of hospitals. The number of cases in Southwestern Virginia is close to the 251 cases per day in Northern Virginia, an area which has many more hospitals.

On September 5, a total of 866 outbreaks throughout the state were under investigation. This included 39 outbreaks at long-term care facilities, which had a total of 9,560 cases and 1,386 deaths.

On September 10, the additional restrictions on the Hampton Roads area of southeastern Virginia were rescinded.

On September 16, the Arlington County Board voted to allow the emergency sidewalk distancing ordinance that it had adopted on July 31 to lapse on September 29 because the ordinance had proven to be ineffective. The Arlington County Manager told the Board before the vote that the county's police had failed to issue any citations for violations of the ordinance, despite the posting of signs that had warned of fines for committing such violations.

On September 25, Governor Northam announced that he and his wife had tested positive for COVID-19.

=== October–December 2020 ===
On October 2, over 1,000 new daily cases were reported, part of a trend of the highest number of daily cases since May.

On October 5, Ralph Northam announced he had recovered from COVID-19, and criticized then-U.S. president Donald Trump for downplaying the virus.

Cases across the state generally staggered around mid October to mid November at about 700 to 1,200 new cases per day before a spike in cases occurred in late November.

On December 9, Governor Northam announced new restrictions through an Executive Order, this included limiting social gatherings from 25 back down to 10, excluding educational, employment, and religious settings. The mask mandate, enacted in June 2020, was expanded to include all indoor settings, and outdoor settings where social distancing is not possible. Finally, the restrictions imposed a curfew from midnight to 5:00 a.m., excluding essential travel. The order went into effect on December 14.

=== January–February 2021 ===
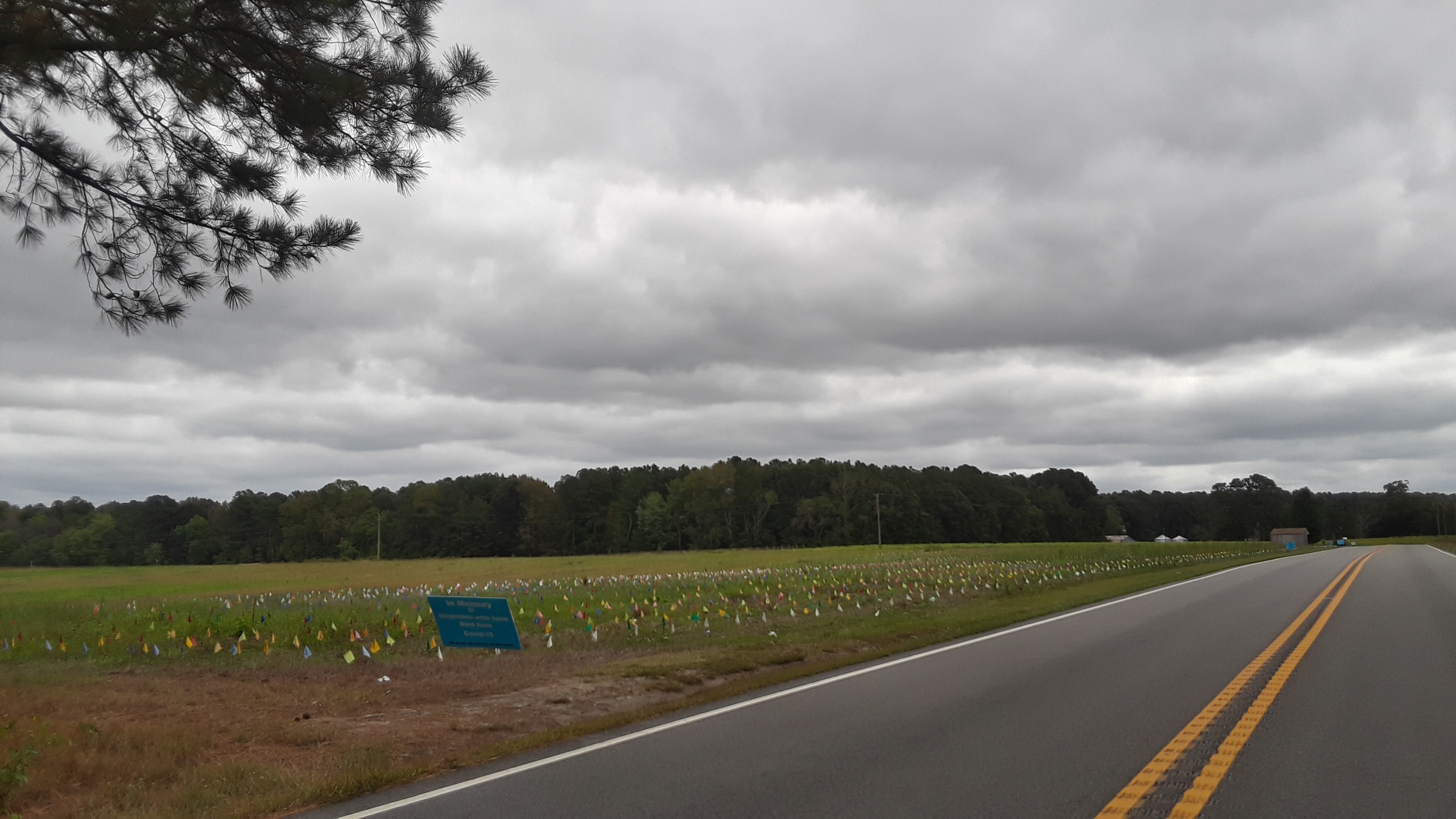
A field of flags in Surry County created as a memorial to Virginians who have died of COVID-19.

According to Bloomberg, on January 15 Virginia ranked near the bottom of U.S. states in terms of utilizing the COVID-19 vaccine supply that it had on hand. Bloomberg reported on January 17 that Virginia had given 3.71 doses per 100 people at a time that the U.S. as a whole had given 4.35 doses per 100 people. Also on January 17, the Prince William Health District in Northern Virginia stopped giving vaccine appointments because of a present and projected limited supply of the vaccine.

By the end of January 2021, nearly 7% of the Commonwealth received their first shot of the COVID-19 vaccine, and 1% have been fully vaccinated.

Into February 2021, cases of COVID-19 began to decline, with the estimated number of active cases dropping from about 65,000 to 40,000 by mid-February. In mid-February approximately 1 million Virginians received their first dose of the COVID-19 vaccine. On February 17, 2021, the state opened its online registration system for COVID-19 vaccines for the general public.

=== March–April 2021 ===
On March 31, 2021, Virginia moved into Phase 1c of the COVID-19 vaccine eligibility. On April 1, 2021, Governor Northam announced that the state would be moving into Phase 2 of the vaccination efforts starting on April 18, 2021, meaning all adults in Virginia, regardless of their health, can register for the COVID-19 vaccine. By May 2021, half of the state received their first dose.

== Vaccination ==
On December 14, 2020, first Pfizer-BioNTech vaccine doses arrived and on December 15, 2020, first Pfizer-BioNTech vaccine doses administered. Vaccination in Long-term Care Facilities begin. As of February 1, 2021, around 817,823 people have been vaccinated with at least one dose in Virginia. Among them, 124, 407 people have been fully vaccinated. Virginia is currently in Phase 2.

- Phase 1a: Vaccinate Healthcare Personnel and Residents of Long Term Care Facilities.
- Phase 1b: Vaccinate Frontline Essential Workers, People Aged 65 years and Older, People Living in Correctional Facilities, Homeless Shelters and Migrant Labor Camps, and People aged 16 through 64 years with a High Risk Medical Condition or Disability that Increases Their Risk of Severe Illness from COVID-19.
- Phase 1c: Vaccinate Other Essential Workers. These workers are in sectors essential to the functioning of society and/or are at higher risk of exposure to SARS-CoV-2, including people working in the follow areas:
  - Energy
  - Water, wastewater, and waste removal workers (includes recycling removal workers)
  - Housing Construction
  - Food Service
  - Transportation and Logistics
  - Institutions of Higher Education Faculty/Staff Finance
  - Information Technology & Communication Media
  - Legal Services
  - Public Safety (engineers)
  - Other Public Health Workers
- Phase 2: General population

== K-12 education ==
As a result of the pandemic, Governor Ralph Northam issued Executive Order Fifty-three closing schools for the remainder of the 2019–2020 school year on March 23, 2020.

In Virginia, decisions on the reopening of schools have been left up to local school districts rather than being made at a statewide level. Before entering Phase II or III of reopening schools to students, every public and private school in Virginia was required to submit a plan outlining their strategies for mitigating public health risk of COVID-19 and complying with CDC and VDH recommendations. Additionally, every public school division was required to submit a plan for providing new instruction to all students in the 2020–2021 academic year, regardless of its operational status, and these instructional plans were required to be posted on the division's website.

The Virginia Department of Health (VDH) has recommended that schools use the CDC Indicators for Dynamic School Decision-Making along with the Interim Guidance for K-12 School Reopening developed by VDH in January 2021 to inform decisions about school operations with regard to COVID-19.

Operating statuses of the 132 school districts throughout the state have varied since the start of the academic year in September 2020. The Virginia Department of Education categorizes the operating statuses into five categories: In Person, Partial in Person, All Hybrid, Partial Hybrid, and Fully Remote. Categories are defined as follows.

In Person - 4+ days in person instruction per week for all students

Partial in Person - 4+ days per week in person for some students; hybrid or remote for all other students

All Hybrid - all students with some in person and some remote leaning, but neither type hitting the 4 days/week threshold

Partial Hybrid - some students hybrid, none hitting the 4 days/week threshold; all other students fully remote

Fully Remote - learning is remote for the vast majority of students, while some students may have in-person learning available to them.

Virginia School Division Operational Status
	September 8, 2020	November 12, 2020	December 14, 2020	January 26, 2021
In Person	10 divisions	15 divisions	9 divisions	15 divisions
Partial in Person	26 divisions	42 divisions	35 divisions	41 divisions
All Hybrid	25 divisions	30 divisions	26 divisions	25 divisions
Partial Hybrid	4 divisions	11 divisions	10 divisions	9 divisions
Fully Remote	67 divisions	34 divisions	52 divisions	42 divisions

NOTE: All Virginia school divisions have offered students and families a fully-remote option to learn.

== Impact on prisons ==
Correctional and detention facilities require special considerations due to unique challenges for the control of COVID-19 transmission among incarcerated persons, staff, and visitors as these facilities may include a range of components (e.g., custody, housing, healthcare, food service, recreation, education) in a single setting. Additional challenges in these facilities include potential high turnover of occupants and staff, newly incarcerated persons from different geographic areas, limited access to health care, limited space, implementation of disease prevention measures, social distancing, and hesitancy of incarcerated persons to disclose symptoms.

The Virginia Department of Corrections plan provides for the early release of eligible inmates who have a viable home plan and a medium or low risk of recidivism. Inmates at a higher risk for COVID-19 complications, who meet the eligibility criteria for release, will only be released if the necessary community support and resources are available. Additional criteria for release include consideration of an inmate's release date, medical condition, and offense history. Inmates with a history of violent sexual offense will not be released according to the plan.

On May 12, 2020, the Virginia ACLU and the state of Virginia reached a settlement agreement related to the early release of prisoners due to COVID-19. The settlement was in response to a case filed in April 2020 by 27 inmates who alleged that the prisons were not considering their early release despite medical conditions that made them at-risk of serious complications from COVID-19. The lawsuit further alleged that the state of Virginia was not in compliance with the U.S. Constitution, as it was failing to release medically vulnerable individuals in state prisons due to the COVID-19 pandemic and by failing to keep them safe from exposure to the coronavirus. As part of the agreement, the Virginia Department of Corrections is required to provide the ACLU with weekly data related to the number of coronavirus cases within prisons as well as information on release decisions.

== Projections ==
A number of organizations have produced models that project the trajectory of the coronavirus outbreak. The Institute for Health Metrics and Evaluation at the University of Washington in Seattle has constructed one of these (the IHME model). Penn Medicine, a consortium of the Perelman School of Medicine and the University of Pennsylvania Health System in Philadelphia, has constructed another, the COVID-19 Hospital Impact Model for Epidemics (CHIME). Among other things, the two models differ in the methods by which they calculate the effectiveness of social distancing in reducing the number of new COVID-19 infections.

As of April 6, 2020, the CHIME was projecting that the peak hospital impact of the COVID-19 outbreak would occur in Northern Virginia at the end of June. On April 24, 2020, the IHME projected that Virginia's hospital resource use and numbers of deaths per day due to COVID-19 had reached their peaks.

== Individual case tracking ==
=== COVIDWISE App ===
COVIDWISE is the mobile app used in the state of Virginia for tracking individual exposure to COVID-19. Through the use of Bluetooth Low Energy (BLE) technology, the app provides a confidential method of notifying people of possible exposure to those who have tested positive for COVID-19. The use of COVIDWISE is voluntary and depends on users to enter an auto-generated number into the app when they receive a positive test result. The BLE then senses phones or mobile devices that may have been within the person's proximity and sends notifications to those devices to alert their users of the exposure.

== Criticism ==
On May 22, 2020, The Washington Post published an article that Mark J. Rozell, the dean of the Schar School of Policy and Government of Virginia's George Mason University, had authored. Rozell wrote that Governor Northam had "shambled" through Virginia's response to the pandemic. Rozell noted that Northam appeared to be ignoring the Centers for Disease Control and Prevention's guidelines for re-opening the economy, thus acting in accordance with President Donald Trump's positions on the subject (see Trump administration communication during the COVID-19 pandemic#Lifting restrictions).

On May 30, 2020, The Washington Post reported that many Republicans, business leaders, and some progressive Democrats were complaining that Northam was moving too slowly to reopen Virginia, while moderate Democrats and minority groups were complaining that he was moving too quickly. The Post noted that national media were pointing out that Virginia's coronavirus testing program had fallen behind those of most other states. Further, despite that well-publicized failure, Northam was permitting all nonessential retail businesses in Virginia to remain open if they could maintain social distancing, while Maryland's Governor Larry Hogan had closed all such businesses. The Post additionally reported that a Republican state senator, William M. Stanley Jr., had categorized Northam's response to the pandemic as being "utter mismanagement."

== Impact on sports ==
In college sports, the National Collegiate Athletic Association cancelled all winter and spring tournaments, most notably the Division I men's and women's basketball tournaments, affecting colleges and universities statewide. On March 16, 2020, the National Junior College Athletic Association also canceled the remainder of the winter seasons as well as the spring seasons.

On March 17, 2020, it was announced that the Virginia Gold Cup, scheduled for May 2, 2020, would be postponed to June 20, 2020.

On June 30, 2020, the Minor League Baseball season was cancelled, causing nearly 20 minor league baseball teams across Virginia not to play during the pandemic.

Virginia's two professional soccer clubs, Loudoun United FC and Richmond Kickers, returned to play in July 2020. Both teams were permitted to have fans attend matches, but under restricted capacity. The Kickers were limited to 875 fans per match (about 9.7% of capacity), and Loudoun United were limited to about 600 spectators per match (about 12% of capacity). Both teams played a truncated season that began in late July 2020 and ended in late October 2020.

In August 2020, the NCAA postponed all fall sports championships to Spring 2021, impacting numerous colleges and university athletic programs across the state. Despite this, several NCAA Division I Football Bowl Subdivision schools, and schools that were members of the Atlantic Coast Conference proceeded with fall sports (cross country, field hockey, football, soccer, volleyball).

On September 12, 2020, the Richmond International Raceway hosted the 2020 Federated Auto Parts 400 race as part of the NASCAR Cup Series, which was held behind closed doors.

On September 26, 2020, several Virginia NCAA Division I FBS football schools began their seasons (Liberty, Virginia, and Virginia Tech). Old Dominion suspended their football season. Schools were limited to 1,000 spectators per game.

In November 2020, several winter sports began slightly later than normal. Schools permitted fans on a school-by-school basis. Some schools (i.e. George Mason, James Madison, and Old Dominion) played without spectators, while others (VCU, Virginia, and Virginia Tech) played with up to 250 fans in attendance.

In March 2021, VCU's men's basketball team was forced to withdraw from the NCAA Tournament due to an outbreak within the program.

== Statistics ==
View source data.
View source data.

== See also ==
- COVID-19 pandemic in Maryland – for impact on Maryland counties in the Washington metropolitan area
- COVID-19 pandemic in Washington, D.C. – for impact on the District of Columbia
- COVID-19 pandemic in West Virginia – for impact on adjacent state
- COVID-19 pandemic in the United States – for impact on the country
- COVID-19 pandemic – for impact on other countries
- Timeline of the COVID-19 pandemic in the United States
