= Maryland Department of Emergency Management =

- MDEM

Agency overview
- Preceding agency: Maryland Emergency Management Agency
- Jurisdiction: State of Maryland
- Headquarters: Hanover, MD
- Employees: >70
- Agency executives: Russell J. Strickland, Secretary; Chas Eby, Deputy Executive Director; Sara Bender, Director of Disaster Risk Reduction; Marcia Deppen, Director of Consequence Management; Janet Moncrieffe, Director of Mission Support; Jorge E. Castillo, Spokesperson
- Child agency: Maryland Joint Operations Center
- Website: http://mdem.maryland.gov/

Maryland Department of Emergency Management (MDEM). is the department of the Maryland state government with primary responsibility and authority for emergency preparedness policy, and for coordinating hazard mitigation, incident response, and disaster recovery. It is headquartered in Hanover, Maryland.

MDEM's authority derives from Title 14 of the Public Safety Article of the Annotated Code of Maryland. This Article creates MDEM, establishes MDEM as a unit of State government within with the primary purpose to ensure that Maryland will be adequately prepared to deal with emergencies that are beyond the capabilities of local authorities, and authorizes the political subdivisions of the state to create emergency management offices of their own. Currently, there are 26 local emergency management offices in Maryland – all 23 counties, along with Annapolis, Baltimore and Ocean City. Article 14 also gives the governor emergency powers—such as temporarily waiving state laws that may interfere with emergency response operations.

MDEM has three directorates which are underneath the Office of the Secretary: Disaster Risk Reduction, Consequence Management, and Mission Support. The structure enables MDEM to efficiently support local jurisdictions, work with state agencies, run our internal operations, and provide preparedness information to the public. The maintenance and operation of the State Emergency Operations Center is also function of MDEM.

MDEM operates the Maryland Joint Operations Center (MJOC), the agency's twenty-four-hour warning point and communications / operations center. This center is responsible for the coordination of all state of Maryland emergency response resources and operates 24-hours per day.

MDEM also operates a State Liaison Officer Program. This branch employs regional Liaison Officers that work in the field directly with local emergency managers and emergency responders in six regions: Western Maryland, National Capital Region, Central Maryland, Southern Maryland, Upper Eastern Shore and Lower Eastern Shore.

== See also ==
- Federal Emergency Management Agency
