= COVID-19 pandemic in Washington, D.C. =

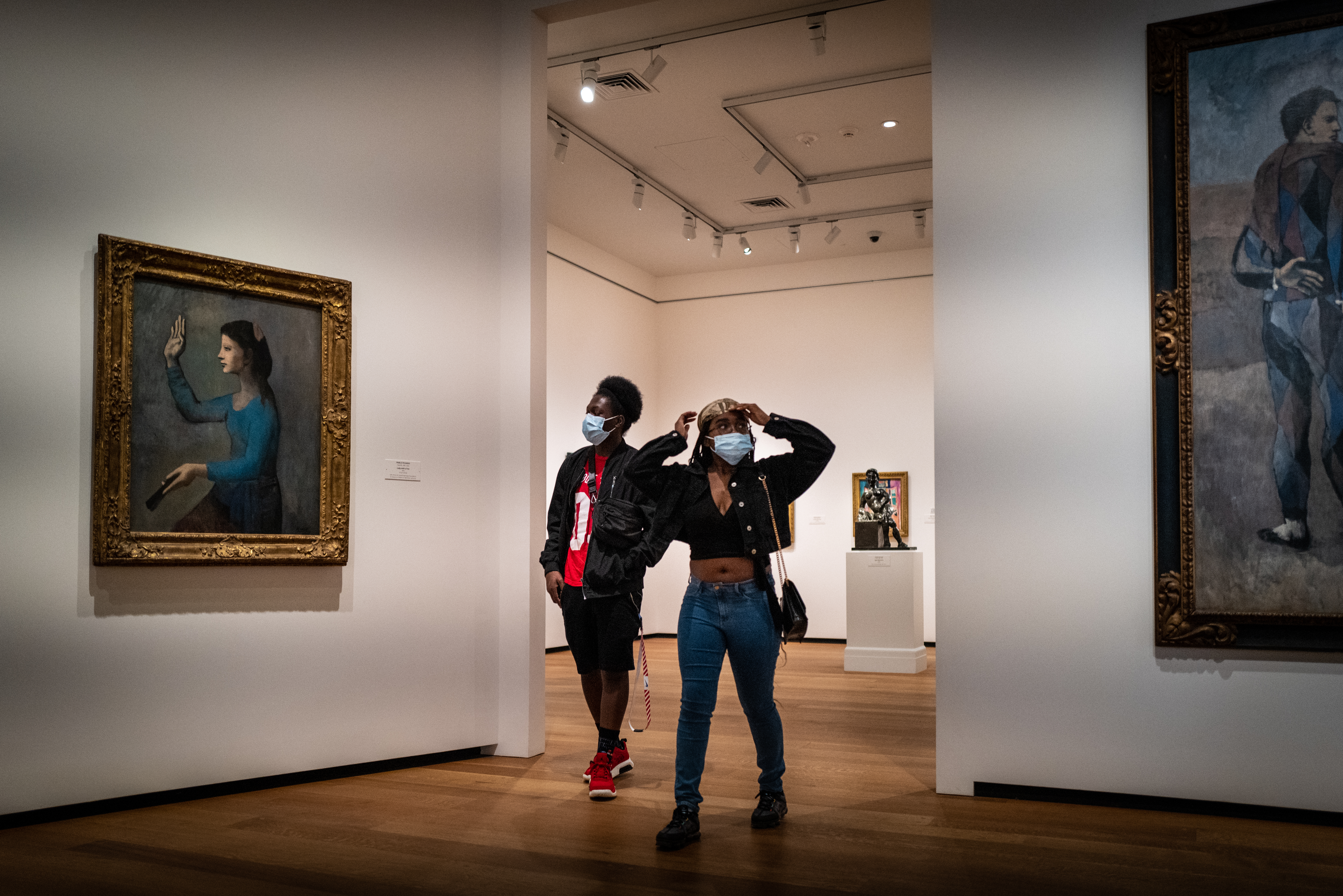
- Visitors wearing masks in the National Gallery of Art, the day before it closed as a precaution against COVID-19
- Disease: COVID-19
- Pathogen: SARS-CoV-2
- Location: Washington, D.C., U.S.
- Index case: Georgetown
- Arrival date: March 7, 2020
- Confirmed cases: 55,918
- Recovered: 34,985
- Deaths: 1,162

Government website
- coronavirus.dc.gov (archived)

The first cases relating to the COVID-19 pandemic in Washington, D.C., were reported on March 7, 2020. The city enacted a variety of public health measures in an attempt to curb the spread of the virus, including limiting business activities, suspending non-essential work, and closing down schools.

As of December 20, 2021, the District of Columbia had administered 1,229,170 COVID-19 vaccine doses and 85% of the population had received at least one shot while 67% were fully vaccinated.

== Preparations ==
Mayor Muriel Bowser signed an executive order on February 28, 2020, that began to prepare Washington, D.C., for coronavirus impacts. The executive order stated that the District's Emergency Operations Center (EOC) would be activated on March 2, 2020, to begin to "coordinate inter-agency information sharing and identify logistical needs for critical incident responses." It was also announced that the Washington, D.C., Department of Health and the Homeland Security and Emergency Management Agency would be responsible for the response planning for COVID-19. On March 2, the D.C. Emergency Operations Center was activated at an Enhanced Watch status, per the executive order.

On March 3, Mayor Bowser, D.C. Department of Health and the D.C. Homeland Security and Emergency Management Agency held a public briefing on the coronavirus and the District's monitoring, preparation, and response.

== Timeline of outbreak ==
=== March 2020 ===
==== March 5–7 ====
On March 7, the first two cases of COVID-19 in Washington, D.C., were confirmed. The first case was a rector at Christ Church in Georgetown, who had not traveled outside the United States recently or had close contact with another confirmed infected coronavirus patient. He had attended the Consortium of Endowed Episcopal Parishes conference in Louisville, Kentucky from February 19–22, then traveled back to Washington, by which time he became sick with what he thought was the flu. He then participated in church services on February 23 and March 1. The rector's condition deteriorated to the point of hospitalization, and after it was confirmed the rector contracted the virus, the church canceled services indefinitely.

The second case was a Nigerian national who traveled from Nigeria to D.C. and went to a hospital in Maryland for treatment. Although the second man was being treated at a Maryland hospital, he was counted as the District's second case by the Centers for Disease Control and Prevention (CDC).

==== March 8–10 ====
On March 9, School Without Walls, a public school in Foggy Bottom, was closed by District of Columbia Public Schools (DCPS) for a full-day deep cleaning and disinfecting by a third-party contractor after an employee was exposed to COVID-19 the week before. The employee tested negative and entered a two-week quarantine. DCPS chancellor Lewis Ferebee announced the closing over Twitter the previous day.

Three more coronavirus cases in D.C. were confirmed the night of March 9, including an attendee of Christ Church Georgetown. D.C. officials recommended a two-week self-quarantine per CDC guidelines for anyone who attended Christ Church on February 24 or between February 28 and March 3. At that time, $1.5 million had been allocated to the pandemic response by the D.C. government.

On March 10, George Washington University announced classes would be moved online after spring break, starting on March 23 and continuing until at least April 5. In addition, all residential students were expected to no longer be living on campus beginning March 21. It was stated that an opening date would not be announced until the end of the instructional continuity period when a decision for the rest of the semester would be made.

Also on March 10, Georgetown Day School, a private school, closed indefinitely and began a deep clean citing concerns about community members affiliated with Christ Church Georgetown.

==== March 11–14 ====
On March 11, Maria Cantwell, a U.S. senator from Washington state, closed her D.C. office due to one of her aides testing positive for the virus.

Georgetown University announced that it would be moving to virtual learning entirely beginning on March 16, and while campus would remain open and key services would remain accessible the university strongly suggested that students return to their homes.

On March 12, the United States Capitol, the White House, and the United States Supreme Court Building closed to most of the public until April after several offices closed and multiple lawmakers went into precautionary quarantines.

On March 13, DCPS announced that they would cancel classes until April 1, implementing online distance learning. Also on March 13, the Washington Metropolitan Area Transit Authority (WMATA) escalated its operations to level 3 of its pandemic flu plan, announcing that service on the Washington Metro would be reduced to one train every 12 minutes from Monday to Saturday and one train every 15 minutes on Sunday beginning on March 17. In addition, Metrobus service would change to a Saturday supplemental schedule on weekdays beginning on March 17.

Mayor Muriel Bowser held a press conference, announcing that gatherings of people over 60 years of age or with preexisting health issues would be limited to 10 people. The restriction would not apply to residences, schools, or places of work. For populations not at-risk the government promoted social distancing measures to limit the spread of the virus.

On March 14, Mayor Bowser issued a statement confirming 6 more positive cases in Washington, D.C., bringing the total number of cases up to 16.

==== March 15–16 ====
On March 15, Bowser's office announced one more positive case in Washington D.C., bringing the total cumulative number of cases to 17. The patient in this case is a 38-year-old woman who came into contact with another case.

The Hill Restaurant Group (HRG) said on March 16 they would comply with restrictions on bars and restaurants ordered by Mayor Bowser on March 15. Tom Johnson, the managing director of the group, had earlier said he would ignore the order, saying it would force his company into bankruptcy.

On the evening of March 16, Mayor Bowser's office released an update that confirmed five more positive cases of coronavirus in the District. The patients involved were a 23-year-old man, a 42-year-old woman with a history of travel to Europe, a 54-year-old woman, a 54-year-old man, and a 56-year-old man. These five cases brought the cumulative number of cases in D.C. to 22.

==== March 17–18 ====
Late on March 17, Mayor Bowser's office announced the confirmation of nine more positive cases in the District, bringing the total number of positive cases to 31. The patients were all male and between the ages of 23 and 61. The 23-year-old patient was confirmed to have attended the Conservative Political Action Conference (CPAC) in National Harbor, Maryland.

On March 18, at least 8 more cases were found, including a DC FEMS employee (leading to a quarantine of 73 firefighters), a U.S. marshal at the Superior Court of the District of Columbia, and an undergraduate student at the George Washington University who lives off-campus.

The Metropolitan Police Department of the District of Columbia announced new social distancing precautions in dealing with callers reporting flu-like symptoms as well as changes to police protocol for citations and warning notices in light of the restriction of certain services in the D.C. government.

==== March 19–20 ====
As of March 19, the number of confirmed cases sharply jumped to 71 as the supply of tests was expanded, an increase of 32 over one day. This includes two more DC FEMS members and an eight-year-old.

The same day, Washington Metro closed the Smithsonian and Arlington Cemetery stations until further notice. Metro ridership reduced by 85% due to the pandemic, leading to general manager Paul Wiedefeld submitting a request to Congress for emergency funding.

On March 20, Mayor Bowser announced the first death related to COVID-19 in the District, a 59-year-old man, Deacon Brother John-Sebastian Laird-Hammond, OFM, a Franciscan friar and permanent deacon, a native of Minonk, Illinois, with underlying medical conditions, specifically a multi-year battle with a type of leukemia who had been undergoing cancer treatments and was therefore more vulnerable to the virus. The number of cases rose to 77.

DCPS extended the school shutdown to April 24, meaning classes would be scheduled to resume on Monday, April 27. In preparation for the beginning of distance learning on March 24, the DCPS Distance Learning platform was released, publicly accessible at dcps.instructure.com/courses/179580. Certain schools would continue to provide lunch on weekdays.

==== March 21–22 ====
On March 21, the D.C. government, operating through the Metropolitan Police Department and the National Park Service announced several road closures around beginning on March 22, 7:00 AM to 8:00 PM, in an effort to reduce congregation of tourists around monuments during the National Cherry Blossom Festival. These crowds had not been conforming to social distancing guidelines and thus presented a possible vector for the transmission of coronavirus. The DC Department of Parks and Recreation closed all of its facilities including parks, playgrounds, and athletic fields. Only dog parks remained open.

The same day, Metrobus announced reduced operation from 325 routes to only 20 high-use corridors. Real-time bus data would no longer be available and drivers may bypass stops in order to observe social distancing guidelines on buses. WMATA said it hoped to restore some routes with limited operation hours soon. Real-time bus data would be restored on June 28, 2020.

The number of cases as of 7:30 PM that day was 98.

On March 22, the second death due to COVID-19 was reported in the District, a 65-year-old woman with underlying medical conditions.

The number of cases as of 7:00 PM that day was 116.

==== March 23–24 ====
On March 23, Mayor Bowser and Chief Financial Officer Jeffrey DeWitt announced that the 2019 tax filing deadlines would be pushed to July 15, instead of the upcoming April 15. The Mayor also urged D.C. residents to remain at home except for "essential activities," clarifying that she would not be issuing a shelter-in-place order as of now.

On that day, Mayor Bowser also commissioned Republic Restoratives Distillery and Compass Coffee, two locally owned companies, for the production of 2,000 US gallons (7,600 L; 1,700 imp gal) of hand sanitizer (1,000 US gallons (3,800 L; 830 imp gal) each) for use by D.C. government workers and emergency responders.

As of 7:00 PM that day, the number of cases was 137.

==== March 25 ====
On March 25, the third death in Washington, D.C., was a 75-year-old woman with underlying health conditions.

==== March 30 ====
On March 30, Mayor Bowser announced a stay-at-home order that would go into effect on April 1. The order stated that residents may only leave their residences to engage in essential activities, including obtaining medical care that cannot be provided through telehealth and obtaining food and essential household goods, to perform or access essential governmental functions, to work at essential businesses, to engage in essential travel and to engage in specific recreational activities that the order defined.

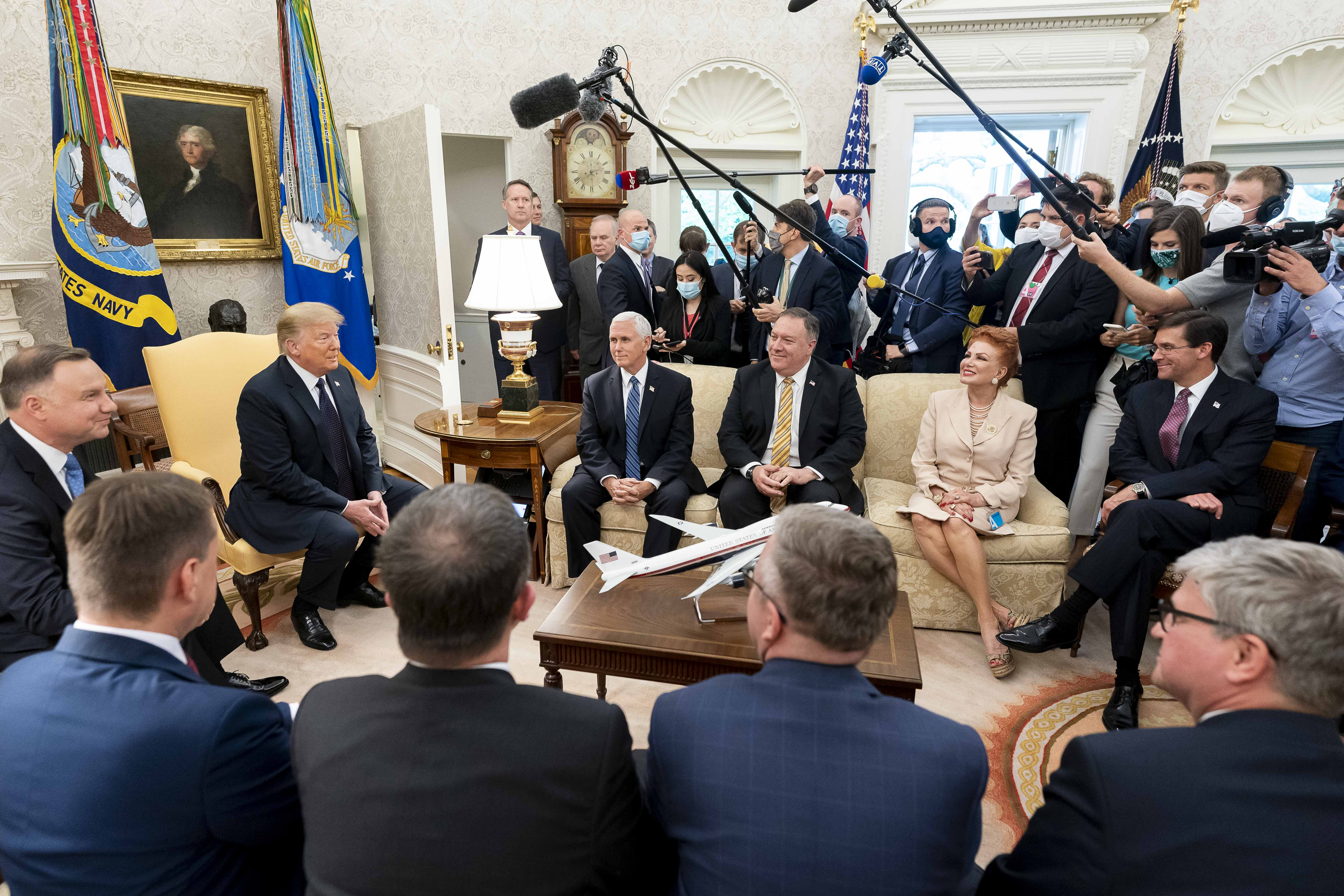
Polish President Andrzej Duda was the first foreign leader to travel to the White House since the start of the COVID-19 pandemic.

Anyone found to be violating the order would be charged with a misdemeanor and subject to a $5,000 fine and/or 90 days in prison. Bowser said, "Staying at home is the best way to flatten the curve and protect yourself, your family, and our entire community from COVID-19."

On the same day, Maryland's Governor Larry Hogan and Virginia's Governor Ralph Northam issued similar stay-at-home orders (see COVID-19 pandemic in Maryland and in Virginia). However, the penalties for violating those orders were different from those in the District.

=== April 2020 ===
On April 6, Bowser announced a government-wide hiring and pay freeze to ensure the District's funds are conserved.

On April 17, DC Public Schools announced that they would remain closed for the rest of the 2019–2020 school year, with a shortened schedule ending the school year on May 29.

=== June 2020 ===
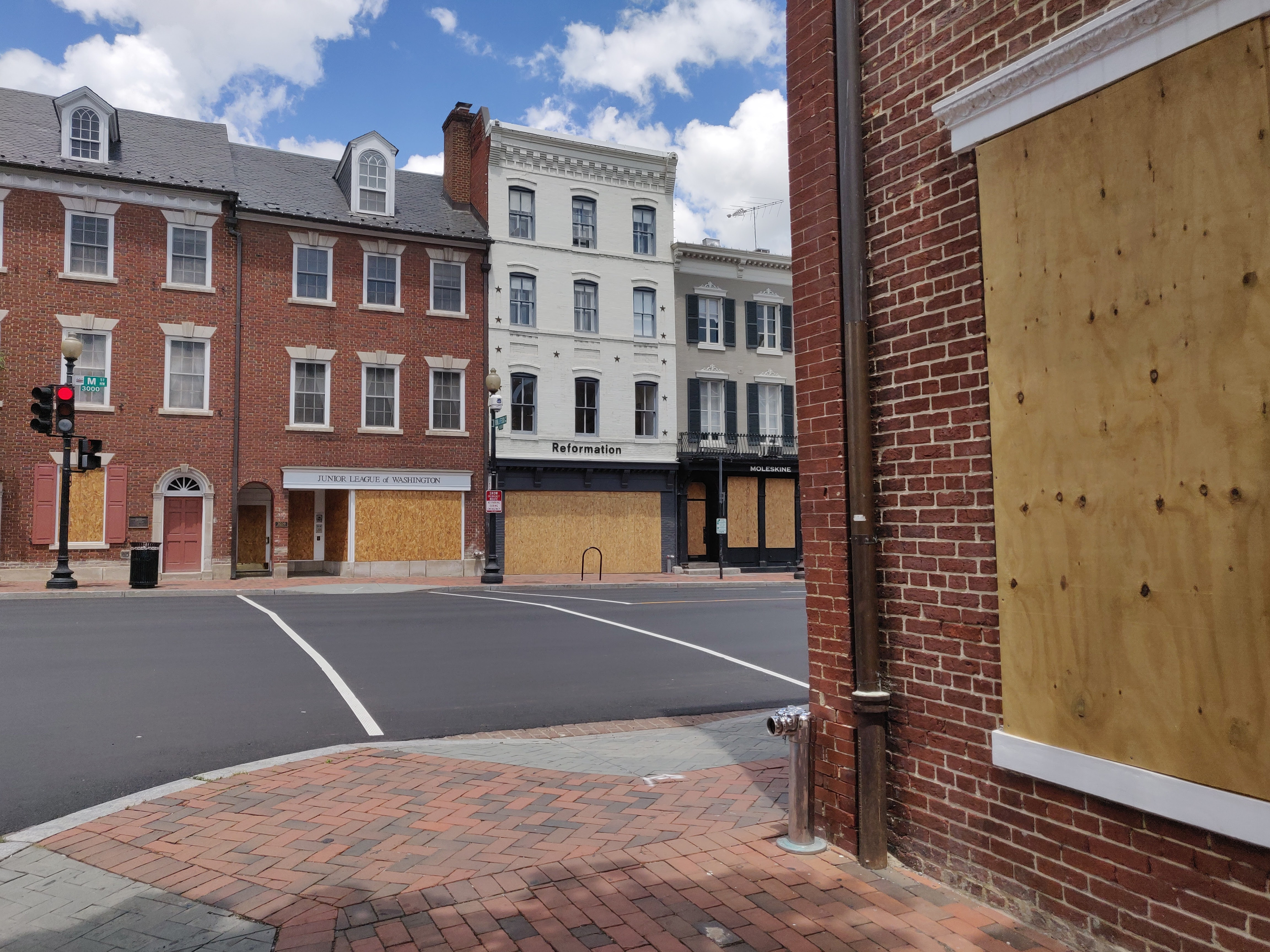
Storefronts boarded up in Georgetown in June in response to the George Floyd protests

During the month of June, D.C. experienced widespread protests relating to the murder of George Floyd. While numbers of protesters were in the thousands, almost all were wearing masks and there was not an appreciable spike in cases that could be traced to the protests.

On June 2, during some of the most intense demonstrations, some protesters were arrested and charged with "wearing a hood-mask" in addition to curfew violations, even though masks were mandatory at the time.

On June 22, with the move to phase 2 of the reopening plan, indoor dining was permitted to begin at 50% capacity, although bar sitting was to remain closed. Gyms were also allowed to reopen, with 5 people per 1,000 square feet (93 m^{2}).

=== July 2020 ===
On July 22, Washington, D.C., imposed new mask requirements. On July 27, self-quarantine restrictions were placed on non-essential travelers arriving from 27 high-risk states.

=== September 2020 ===
A cluster of COVID-19 infections emerged among people at the White House, including many U.S. government officials, who were in close contact with one another. Numerous high-profile individuals were infected, including President Donald Trump, who was hospitalized for three days. At least 48 White House staff members or associates, closely working with White House personnel, tested positive. The White House resisted efforts to engage in contact tracing, leaving it unclear how many people were infected in total and what the origins of the spread were.

Many of the infections appeared to be related to a ceremony held on September 26 in the Rose Garden for the nomination of Amy Coney Barrett to the Supreme Court, where seating was not socially distanced and participants were mostly unmasked. Trump himself may have been infectious at that point, but he and his entourage attended several subsequent events unmasked, including the first presidential debate against Joe Biden in Cleveland, Ohio on September 29. The next day, Presidential Counselor Hope Hicks was placed in quarantine aboard Air Force One while returning with Trump from a campaign event in Minnesota. Following that, the president proceeded on schedule to an October 1 New Jersey fundraiser where he mingled, unmasked, with donors. More infections were reported in late October among Vice President Mike Pence's staff, and a second large outbreak occurred after Election Day, after Trump held a watch party in the East Room.

Other infections included First Lady Melania Trump; GOP Senators Thom Tillis, Mike Lee, and Ron Johnson; GOP Representative Matt Gaetz; Trump campaign manager Bill Stepien; RNC Chair Ronna McDaniel; former White House counselor Kellyanne Conway; former New Jersey Governor Chris Christie; Notre Dame president John I. Jenkins; Press Secretary Kayleigh McEnany; presidential advisor Stephen Miller; Chief of Staff Mark Meadows; and Housing and Urban Development Secretary Ben Carson. As of November 11, at least 48 people had tested positive. At least one person, White House security office head Crede Bailey, was reported as "gravely ill."

=== October 2020 ===
On October 5, DC Public Schools announced an updated reopening plan, with certain elementary students having an option of in-person or virtual learning starting on November 9, with secondary schools remaining as virtual instruction until February 1. However, the mayor and school chancellor, Lewis Ferebee, had developed the plan without informing the various faculty unions or asking for input, and the union maintains that the schools are not ready to be reopened.

=== January 2021 ===
On January 15, organizers of the annual March for Life announced that the 2021 march, scheduled for January 29, would be moved online due to the pandemic, as well as a security measure following the 2021 storming of the United States Capitol.

On January 19, a memorial service was held at the Lincoln Memorial, to commemorate nearly 400,000 citizens of the United States who died of the virus. President-elect Joe Biden and Vice President-elect Kamala Harris attended, and Catholic Archbishop of Washington, DC, Cardinal Wilton Daniel Gregory, gave the invocation.

=== February 2021 ===
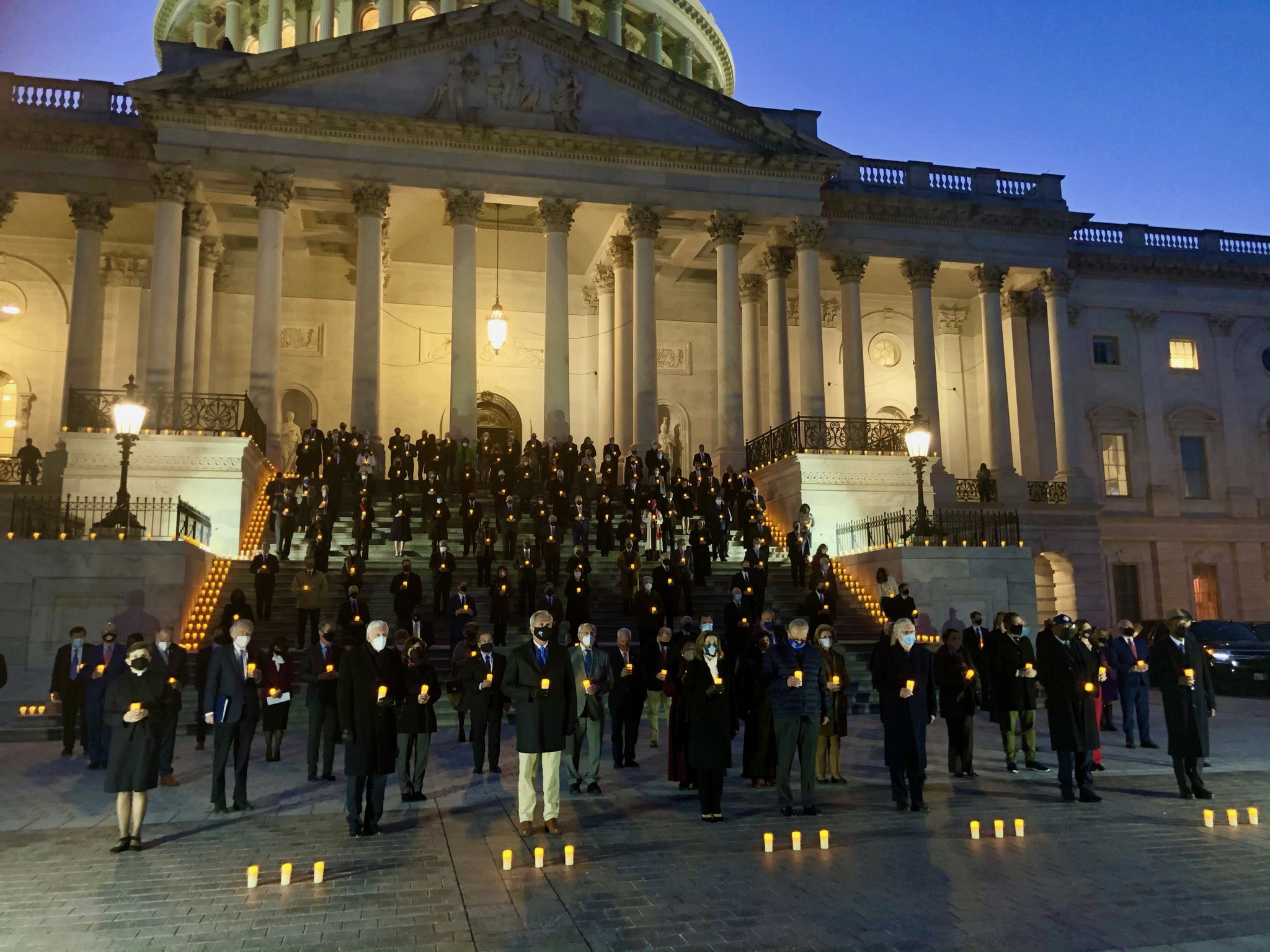
Members of the 117th congress participate in a vigil for victims at the US Capitol.

The 117th Congress held a moment of silence and vigil in memory of those who died of COVID-19 on February 23.

== Projections ==
A number of organizations have produced models that project the trajectory of the coronavirus outbreak. The Institute for Health Metrics and Evaluation at the University of Washington in Seattle has constructed one of these (the IHME). Penn Medicine, a consortium of the Perelman School of Medicine and the University of Pennsylvania Health System in Philadelphia, has constructed another, the COVID-19 Hospital Impact Model for Epidemics (CHIME).

Among other things, the two models differ in the methods by which they calculate the effectiveness of social distancing in reducing the number of new COVID-19 infections. The District is using the IHME as a best-case scenario and the more conservative CHIME to prepare for a surge that its planners consider to be more likely.

As of April 3, the CHIME was projecting that the peak hospital impact of the COVID-19 outbreak would occur in the District at the end of June. On April 5, an update to the IHME model revised that model's forecasts. The revised model suggests that the District would experience the peak of its outbreak on April 16.

=== Concerns in relation to the January 6 U.S. Capitol attack ===
Public health experts said that the storming of the Capitol was a potential superspreader event. Activist Tim "Baked Alaska" Gionet participated in the riot despite a recent positive diagnosis, and few members of the crowd wore face coverings, with many coming from out of town. Anthony Fauci, director of the National Institute of Allergy and Infectious Diseases and lead member of the White House Coronavirus Task Force, said that the rioters' failure to "adhere to the fundamentals of public health" to prevent the spread of COVID-19—such as "universal wearing of masks, keeping physical distance, [and] avoiding crowds in congregate settings"—placed them at risk. The day after the event, Eric Toner, a senior scholar from the Johns Hopkins Center for Health Security, said the storming of the Capitol was "extraordinarily dangerous" from a public-health perspective.

As many as 200 congressional staffers reportedly sheltered in various rooms inside the Capitol, further increasing the risk of transmission. Brian P. Monahan, the attending physician of Congress, reported that members of Congress who were in protective isolation during the attack, some for several hours, may have been exposed to others with COVID-19; Monahan advised members to take protective measures, monitor for symptoms, and take a precautionary RT-PCR test.

A video of members of Congress sheltering in place shows a group of maskless Republicans, including Andy Biggs, Scott Perry, Michael Cloud and Markwayne Mullin, refusing masks offered by Representative Lisa Blunt Rochester; Blunt Rochester later wrote that she was "disappointed in my colleagues who refused to wear a mask" but "encouraged by those who did." On January 12, a bill was introduced in the House to impose a $500 fine the first day members refuse to wear a mask on the floor and a $2,500 fine for the second time. The money would be deducted from the offending members and staffers pay.

Representative Jacob LaTurner tested positive after the lockdown was lifted, and, as a result, was absent from the House floor when the Electoral College certification resumed. Starting January 11, four members of Congress, Representatives Bonnie Watson Coleman, Pramila Jayapal, Brad Schneider and Adriano Espaillat tested positive after being exposed to maskless members of Congress during the lockdown. All had gone into isolation while awaiting testing results. Jayapal condemned Republican colleagues who, while sheltering in place during the riots, "not only cruelly refused to wear a mask but mocked colleagues and staff who offered them one." After sheltering in the same room on January 6, Conan Harris, husband of Representative Ayanna Pressley, tested positive on the night of January 12, putting both Harris and Presley into quarantine.

More than two weeks after the storming, 38 Capitol Police officers tested positive for the virus. However, it was unclear how many of them were on duty during the event or when they contracted it. On January 25, the commander of the District of Columbia National Guard, Major General William Walker, said that nearly 200 troops deployed to the capital had tested positive for COVID-19. The number of cases had risen by nearly five times from the 45 cases reported on January 15.

== Statistics ==
Total cases by race As of November 17, 2020
Race	Total cases	Percent
Black	9,166	47%
Two or more races	5,392	28%
White	4,378	22%
Asian	311	2%
Unknown	124	1%
Native Hawaiian/Pacific Islander	56	0%
American Indian	38	0%

Total deaths by race As of November 17, 2020
Race	Total deaths	Percent
Total	665	100%
Black	495	74%
Hispanic/Latino	88	13%
Non-Hispanic White	67	10%
Asian	8	1%
Other	7	1%

Total cases by age As of November 17, 2020
Age group	Total cases	Percent
Total	19,465	100%
0-4	429	2%
5-14	727	4%
15-19	689	4%
20-24	1,788	9%
25-34	4,629	24%
35-44	3,325	17%
45-54	2,625	13%
55-64	2,470	13%
65-74	1,512	8%
75+	1,250	6%
Unknown	21	0%

Total deaths by age As of November 17, 2020
Age group	Total deaths	Percent
Total	665	100%
0-9	0	0%
10-19	0	0%
20-29	5	1%
30-39	13	2%
40-49	24	4%
50-59	80	12%
60-69	151	23%
70-79	165	25%
80+	227	34%

== Government response ==
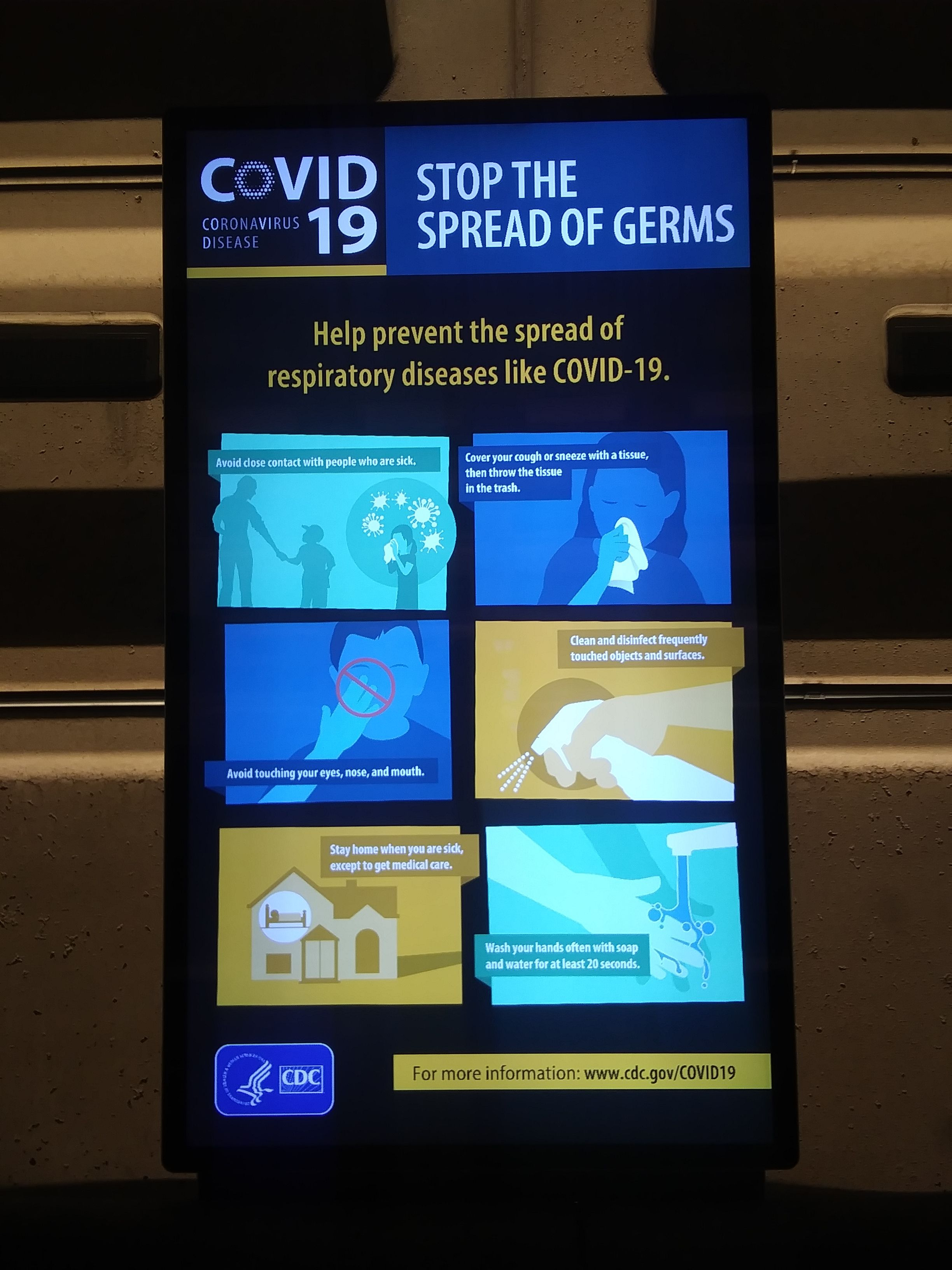
Electronic sign in a Washington Metro station during the coronavirus pandemic.

On March 11, Mayor Muriel Bowser declared a state of emergency for the District of Columbia. The declaration allowed Bowser to request federal disaster funds and to address price gouging. The order also gave her additional authorities, including the ordering of quarantines without court approval.

On March 16, the District government suspended on-site bar and restaurant service and shut down movie theaters and gyms. Restaurants could still offer food for carryout and delivery, but customers could not dine in.

On March 20, Mayor Bowser issued an order that prohibited mass gatherings of 50 or more people. The order also prohibited table service and service to standing customers at restaurants, bars and multi-purpose facilities, including seated, fast food and fast casual restaurants. Those businesses could only operate for take-out, "grab-and-go" and delivery operations.

The Mayor's March 20 order also required nightclubs, health clubs, health spas, massage parlors, and theaters to continue their suspension of operations, which the District's government had initially ordered on March 17. The order further closed to the public all facilities that the District's Department of Recreation operated, including playgrounds, parks, and athletic fields.

The District of Columbia Medical Reserve Corps (DC MRC), a volunteer organization under the District of Columbia Department of Health, was mobilized to aid emergency workers in responding to the coronavirus pandemic throughout D.C. On March 21, Mayor Bowser called for more volunteers to join the task force.

On March 24, Mayor Bowser issued an order "to temporarily cease all non-essential business activities, including tour guides and touring services; gyms, health clubs, spas, and massage establishments; theaters, auditoriums, and other places of large gatherings; nightclubs; hair, nail, and tanning salons and barbershops; tattoo parlors; sales not involved in essential services; retail clothing stores; and professional services not devoted to assisting essential business operations."

Bowser's March 24 order defined "Construction and Building Trades" as "essential businesses", but did not define private construction projects themselves as being "essential". However, The Washington Post reported on March 28 that the District of Columbia, Maryland and Virginia had designated construction as "essential," along with hospitals, grocery stores, banks and several other types of businesses. The Post reported that each of these jurisdictions had allowed private construction, including home building and commercial developments, to continue.

The Post reported that John Falcicchio, Bowser's chief of staff, had stated that the District, Maryland and Virginia had agreed to follow the federal guidance declaring construction to be essential work. However, the Post reported that several states, including Pennsylvania and Vermont, had suspended or prohibited all construction work (except for emergencies) as unnecessary during a public health crisis. The Post further reported that the State of Washington's transportation department had suspended work on nearly all of its projects and that Washington's governor had clarified his stay-at-home order to state that commercial and residential construction were generally prohibited "because construction is not considered to be an essential activity."

The United States Department of Homeland Security's March 28 guidance on essential critical infrastructure lists as "essential" the construction of residential/shelter facilities and services (see "essential services"), energy-related facilities, communications, and information technology, public works including the construction of critical or strategic infrastructure and infrastructure that is temporarily required to support COVID-19 response, is for certain other types of community- or government-based operations or is otherwise critical, strategic, or essential. The guidance does not contain any such listings for other types of construction.

On March 30, Bowser announced a stay-at-home order that would go into effect on April 1. The order stated that residents may only leave their residences to engage in essential activities, including obtaining medical care that cannot be provided through telehealth and obtaining food and essential household goods, to perform or access essential governmental functions, to work at essential businesses, to engage in essential travel and to engage in specific recreational activities that the order defined. Anyone found to be violating the order would be charged with a misdemeanor and subject to a $5,000 fine and/or 90 days in prison.

=== Schools ===
On March 13, District of Columbia Public Schools (DCPS) shut down schools from March 16 to March 31. March 16 was reserved for professional development for teachers in preparation for the implementation of distance learning. The April Spring Break period was moved to March 17 to March 23, after which classes were set to resume online. DCPS-sponsored out-of-state travel for students was suspended until May 1 and staff travel was restricted. During the closure, several schools were set to offer meals to students from 10 am to 2 pm on weekdays.

D.C. Public Schools had an all-virtual start to the 2020–21 school year for students in pre-K through the 12th grade, from August 31 to at least November 6. On October 5, DC Public Schools announced an updated reopening plan, with certain elementary students having an option of in-person or virtual learning starting on November 9, with secondary schools remaining as virtual instruction until February 1. However, the mayor and school chancellor, Lewis Ferebee, had developed the plan without informing the various faculty unions or asking for input, and the union maintained that the schools were not ready to be reopened.

== Impact on sports ==
The pandemic affected several sports in the district. On March 12, Major League Baseball cancelled the remainder of spring training, and on March 16, they announced that the season would be postponed indefinitely, after the recommendations from the CDC to restrict events of more than 50 people for the next eight weeks, affecting the Washington Nationals. Also on March 12, the National Basketball Association announced the season would be suspended for 30 days, affecting the Washington Wizards. In the National Hockey League, the season was suspended for an indefinite amount of time, affecting the Washington Capitals.

In college sports, the National Collegiate Athletic Association cancelled all winter and spring tournaments, most notably the Division I men's and women's basketball tournaments, affecting colleges and universities districtwide. On March 16, the National Junior College Athletic Association also canceled the remainder of the winter seasons as well as the spring seasons.

== See also ==
- COVID-19 pandemic in Maryland – for impact on Maryland counties in the Washington metropolitan area
- COVID-19 pandemic in Virginia – for impact on Virginia counties in the Washington metropolitan area
- COVID-19 pandemic in the United States – for impact on the country
- COVID-19 pandemic – for impact on other countries
