= Virginia Governor's Cabinet =

Senior officers of executive branch

Cabinet of Virginia
- Purpose: Advisory body to the Governor of Virginia
- Headquarters: Richmond, Virginia
- Governor of Virginia: Abigail Spanberger
- Membership: 15 Members: 12 Cabinet Secretaries; 3 Cabinet-Level Officers
- Website: https://www.governor.virginia.gov/cabinet/

The Virginia Governor's Cabinet is a body of the most senior appointed officers of the executive branch of the Government of Virginia. The Cabinet is responsible for advising the Governor of Virginia, and its secretaries oversee various Virginia state agencies. Cabinet officers are nominated by the governor and then presented to the Virginia General Assembly for confirmation. Once confirmed, members of the Cabinet receive the title "Secretary" and serve at the pleasure of the governor. Two cabinet-level officials are not secretaries, and directly support the Governor's Office.

Cabinet members report directly to the Governor of Virginia. The Lieutenant Governor of Virginia does not have any statutory authority over the cabinet, and is not considered a member. The current Cabinet is serving under Governor Abigail Spanberger.

== In general ==
=== Appointment ===
Each Cabinet secretary is appointed by the governor of Virginia, subject to confirmation by the Virginia General Assembly if in session when the appointment is made. If the General Assembly is not in session, then the appointment is acted on by the General Assembly at its next succeeding session. Each secretary is appointed for a four-year term but may be removed at any time by the governor. Before discharging their duties, each secretary must take an oath to faithfully execute the duties of their office.

=== Powers and duties ===
Each Cabinet secretary is subject to direction and supervision by the governor. All agencies assigned to each secretary exercise their powers and duties in accordance with the general policy established by the secretary acting on behalf of the governor. Each secretary has the power to resolve administrative, jurisdictional, operational, program, or policy conflicts between agencies or officials assigned to them, oversees and directs the formulation of program budgets for their assigned agencies, is responsible for holding their assigned agency heads accountable for their actions, and directs the development of goals, objectives, policies and plans for their assigned agencies.

== Composition ==
The Governor's Cabinet is composed of the following officers, listed with the agencies they supervise:

- Secretary of the Commonwealth
- Secretary of Administration
  - Virginia Department of Human Resource Management
  - Virginia Department of General Services
  - Office of Employment Dispute Resolution
- Secretary of Agriculture and Forestry
  - Virginia Department of Agriculture and Consumer Services
  - Virginia Department of Forestry
- Secretary of Commerce and Trade
  - Board of Accountancy
  - Virginia Department of Business Assistance
  - Virginia Department of Housing and Community Development
  - Virginia Department of Labor and Industry
  - Virginia Department of Mines, Minerals and Energy
  - Virginia Department of Professional and Occupational Regulation
- Secretary of Education
  - Virginia Department of Education
- Secretary of Finance
  - Virginia Department of Accounts
  - Virginia Department of Planning and Budget
  - Virginia Department of Taxation
  - Virginia Department of the Treasury
- Secretary of Health and Human Resources
  - Virginia Department for the Aging
  - Virginia Department for the Deaf and Hard of Hearing
  - Virginia Department of Health
  - Virginia Department of Health Professions
  - Virginia Department of Medical Assistance Services
  - Virginia Department of Behavioral Health and Developmental Services
  - Virginia Department for Aging and Rehabilitative Services
  - Virginia Department of Social Services
  - Virginia Department for the Blind and Vision Impaired
- Secretary of Natural Resources
  - Virginia Department of Conservation and Recreation
  - Virginia Department of Environmental Quality
  - Virginia Department of Wildlife Resources
  - Virginia Department of Historic Resources
  - Virginia Marine Resources Commission
- Secretary of Public Safety and Homeland Security
  - Virginia Alcoholic Beverage Control Authority
  - Virginia Department of Correctional Education
  - Virginia Department of Corrections
  - Virginia Department of Criminal Justice Services
  - Virginia Department of Emergency Management
  - Virginia Department of Fire Programs
  - Virginia Department of Forensic Science
  - Virginia Department of Juvenile Justice
  - Virginia Department of Military Affairs
  - Virginia Parole Board
  - Virginia State Police
- Secretary of Transportation
  - Virginia Department of Aviation
  - Virginia Department of Motor Vehicles
  - Virginia Department of Rail and Public Transportation
  - Virginia Department of Transportation
  - Virginia Port Authority
  - Commonwealth Transportation Board
- Secretary of Veterans Affairs and Defense Affairs
  - Virginia Department of Veterans Services
  - Virginia War Memorial
  - Secure Commonwealth Panel

== Current Cabinet members ==
The current cabinet serves under Governor Abigail Spanberger. Some nominees are yet to be confirmed to their positions.

Office	Incumbent
Secretary of the Commonwealth	Candi Mundon King
Secretary of Administration	Traci DeShazor
Secretary of Agriculture and Forestry	Katie Frazier
Secretary of Commerce and Trade	Carrie Chenery
Secretary of Education	Dr. Jeffery O. Smith
Secretary of Finance	Mark Sickles
Secretary of Health and Human Resources	Marvin B. Figueroa
Secretary of Labor	Jessica Looman
Secretary of Natural Resources	David Bulova
Secretary of Public Safety and Homeland Security	Stanley Meador
Secretary of Transportation	Nick Donohue
Secretary of Veterans and Defense Affairs	Timothy P. Williams

=== Cabinet-level positions ===
Office	Incumbent
Chief of Staff	Bonnie Krenz-Schurman
Chief Diversity Officer	Dr. Sesha Moon
Counsel to the Governor	Matt McGuire

== See also ==
- Government of Virginia
- Cabinet of the United States
