= Commonwealth Transportation Board =

Government agency in Virginia, United States

The Commonwealth Transportation Board, formerly the State Highway and Transportation Board, regulates and funds transportation in Virginia.

It supervises the Virginia Department of Transportation (VDOT), the Department of Rail and Public Transportation (DPRT), the Department of Aviation (DOAV), the Department of Motor Vehicles (DMV), the Virginia Port Authority, the Motor Vehicle Dealer Board, and the Virginia Commercial Space Flight Authority (VCSFA).

== Membership ==
The Board consists of seventeen members:

- The Secretary of Transportation
- The Commissioner of the Virginia Department of Transportation
- The Director of the Virginia Department of Rail and Public Transportation
- Fourteen citizen members

The citizen members are appointed by the Governor to four-year terms, subject to confirmation by the General Assembly, and removable from office by the Governor at their pleasure. The Secretary of Transportation serves as chairman of the Board.

== Authority ==
The Board has power to:

- Choose locations of routes
- Award contracts for construction, maintenance, and improvement of roads
- Make traffic regulations
- Name highways
- Enter into contracts with local entities created for transportation purposes
- Contract with other states
- Administer, distribute, and allocate funds in the Transportation Trust Fund
- Regulate outdoor theaters

All of these powers must be exercised within the framework of state law.

== Highway rest stops ==
As of 2008, Virginia operated 42 rest stops and visitor centers along its interstate highways. In response to budget pressures, the Board sought public input and determined to reduce costs by closing 19 rest stops and expanding the truck parking lots at the remaining stops to accommodate the trucks that would other park and sleep at the stops designated for closing. The Board also removed the two-hour limit on truck parking. The closures began on July 21, 2009 The Board's funding options were limited, because Federal law 23 U.S.C. §111 prohibits commercialization of interstate highway rest stops. The closing resulted in a $9 million annual saving. At the Board's first meeting in January 2010, it reversed the decision to close the rest stops and reassigned $3 million in highway maintenance funds to keep the 19 rest stops open until the end of the fiscal year. No long-term funding source was identified.
