= Aviation in Virginia =

- Aviation in the United States
- Flag of the Commonwealth of Virginia

Airports
- Commercial – primary: 9
- Commercial – non-primary: 57
- General aviation: 66
- Other public-use airports: 0
- Military and other airports: 11

First flight
- 7 May 1801 (balloon), 3 Sept 1908 (powered)

Aviation in Virginia encompasses a wide range of civil, military, and aerospace activities with historical roots extending back to the early 19th century. The state's first recorded aeronautical event occurred in 1801, when a balloon flight was launched from the College of William & Mary in Williamsburg, Virginia, using wine spirits as fuel.

Virginia has played a significant role in the development of American aviation. During the Civil War, it was the site of the first military use of aerial reconnaissance by balloon. In the early 20th century, Orville Wright conducted military flight demonstrations at Fort Myer, including the first powered flight in the state and the first fatal aircraft accident in U.S. history.

The Commonwealth is home to a robust general aviation community, three major commercial airports, over 60 public-use airports, and numerous aviation-related organizations and businesses. The Virginia Department of Aviation oversees state aviation policy and infrastructure.

Virginia also hosts several major aerospace and defense contractors, including Northrop Grumman, Aurora Flight Sciences, and Rocket Lab USA, and is home to key federal installations such as NASA's Wallops Flight Facility and the Mid-Atlantic Regional Spaceport.

The state's military aviation presence includes the Virginia Air National Guard, Joint Base Langley–Eustis, and Naval Air Station Oceana, making it a strategic hub for both national defense and aerospace innovation.

== Events ==
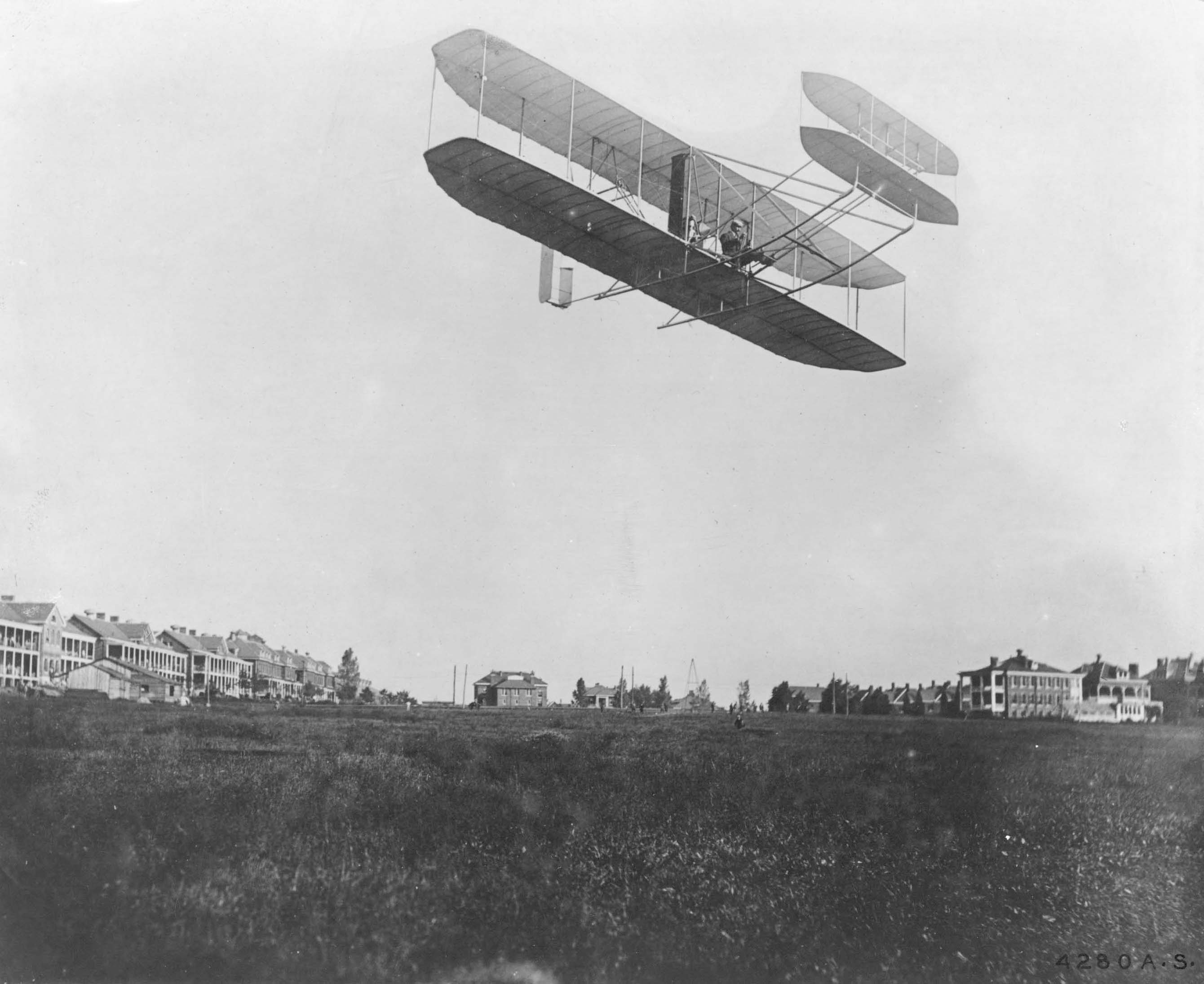
Orville Wright demonstrating the Flyer to the U.S. Army at Fort Myer, Virginia, September 1908. Photo by C.H. Claudy.

- 1862 – Thaddeus S. C. Lowe and the Union Army Balloon Corps during the Peninsula Campaign of the American Civil War: During the American Civil War, Thaddeus S. C. Lowe led the Union Army Balloon Corps in providing aerial reconnaissance for the Union forces. Notably, during the Peninsula Campaign in 1862, Lowe's balloon, the Intrepid, was used to observe Confederate positions, aiding Union generals in strategic planning.
- 3 September 1908 – Orville Wright's first heavier-than-air flight in Virginia at Fort Myer: Orville Wright conducted the first powered flight in Virginia at Fort Myer on September 3, 1908, as part of demonstrations for the U.S. Army Signal Corps. These flights showcased the potential of the Wright brothers' aircraft for military applications.
- 17 September 1908 – First fatality in powered flight: On September 17, 1908, during a demonstration flight at Fort Myer, the Wright Flyer crashed due to a propeller failure. Orville Wright was seriously injured, and his passenger, Lieutenant Thomas Selfridge, became the first person to die in a powered aircraft accident.
- 27 May 1931 – Inauguration of the first full-scale wind tunnel at Langley Field: The world's first full-scale wind tunnel opened at Langley Field near Hampton, Virginia. This facility allowed for aerodynamic testing of full-size aircraft and played a crucial role in advancing aviation technology during World War II and beyond.
- 16 June 1941 – Opening of Washington National Airport: Washington National Airport (now Ronald Reagan Washington National Airport) officially opened in Arlington, Virginia. President Franklin D. Roosevelt attended the ceremony and observed the first official landing, marking a significant development in the region's aviation infrastructure.
- 24 May 1976 – Concorde's inaugural flights to Washington Dulles International Airport: On May 24, 1976, two Concorde supersonic airliners, operated by British Airways and Air France, landed at Washington Dulles International Airport, marking the beginning of regular supersonic transatlantic passenger service to the United States.
- 2025 – Annual aviation events in Virginia: The Virginia Department of Aviation hosts various events throughout the year, including fly-ins, festivals, and educational workshops. Notable events in 2025 include the "From the Flight Deck - LIVE" webinar on May 31, focusing on pilot phraseology, and the "Discover Flight with the Ninety-Nines" event on June 1, promoting women in aviation.

== Aircraft Manufacturers ==
=== Dynamic Aviation ===
Dynamic Aviation is an aviation solutions provider headquartered in Bridgewater, Virginia. Founded in 1997, the company specializes in modifying and operating aircraft for special-mission operations, including intelligence, surveillance, and reconnaissance (ISR), aerial data acquisition, and aerial firefighting. Dynamic Aviation operates a fleet of over 150 aircraft, including Beechcraft King Airs and Boeing 737s, and maintains a 14 CFR Part 145 Repair Station at its Bridgewater Air Park facility. The company is also restoring Columbine II, the first aircraft to bear the call sign "Air Force One," which served President Dwight D. Eisenhower.

=== RapidFlight, LLC ===
RapidFlight, LLC is a Manassas-based company that designs and manufactures unmanned aircraft systems (UAS) for defense and commercial applications. Founded in 2021, it focuses on rapid prototyping and modular design to deliver mission-specific UAS. In 2022, the company announced a $5.5 million investment in a new facility in Virginia, creating over 100 new jobs.

=== Advanced Aircraft Company ===
Advanced Aircraft Company (AAC) is based in Hampton, Virginia, and specializes in hybrid-electric vertical takeoff and landing (VTOL) unmanned aerial systems. The company was founded to develop advanced UAS platforms using distributed electric propulsion and modular design for long-endurance missions in defense and commercial sectors.

=== Eagle Technologies, LLC ===
Eagle Technologies is located in Newport News, Virginia, and provides aerospace engineering and manufacturing services. The company specializes in rotorcraft components, including composite rotor blades and transmission systems for military and commercial applications. Eagle offers full-cycle aerospace solutions, including prototyping, design, analysis, and advanced composites manufacturing.

=== AeroVironment, Inc. ===
AeroVironment, Inc. is a defense technology company headquartered in Arlington, Virginia. It is the leading supplier of small unmanned aerial systems (UAS) to the U.S. Department of Defense, including the Raven, Puma, and Switchblade systems. The company also develops loitering munition systems and autonomous aircraft for both military and civilian applications.

=== MAG Aerospace ===
MAG Aerospace is a defense contractor based in Fairfax, Virginia, offering intelligence, surveillance, and reconnaissance (ISR) services. The company provides turnkey solutions in operations, training, and systems engineering for airborne ISR platforms. As of 2025, MAG operates globally and supports U.S. and allied government operations.

== Aerospace ==
Virginia plays a significant role in the aerospace industry, hosting a range of facilities and companies involved in space exploration, research, and manufacturing.

=== Wallops Flight Facility ===
Wallops Flight Facility, located on Wallops Island, is a NASA-owned launch site that supports suborbital and orbital missions. Established in 1945, it provides launch services for sounding rockets, small satellites, and resupply missions to the International Space Station.

=== Mid-Atlantic Regional Spaceport (MARS) ===
Adjacent to Wallops Flight Facility, the Mid-Atlantic Regional Spaceport (MARS) is operated by the Virginia Spaceport Authority. It supports commercial, government, and research satellite launches. MARS features multiple launch pads, including those used by Antares and Rocket Lab's Electron rocket.

=== Northrop Grumman Innovation Systems ===
Formerly known as Orbital ATK, Northrop Grumman Innovation Systems is headquartered in Dulles, Virginia. It designs and builds spacecraft, launch vehicles (including Antares), and satellite systems. The company conducts ISS resupply missions from Wallops Island under NASA's Commercial Resupply Services program.

=== Rocket Lab USA ===
Rocket Lab operates Launch Complex-2 at Wallops Island for missions using its Electron rocket. The site complements its New Zealand launch facility and supports U.S. government and commercial payloads. Rocket Lab is also developing its larger Neutron rocket in the region.

=== Aurora Flight Sciences ===
Aurora Flight Sciences, a Boeing subsidiary based in Manassas, Virginia, develops advanced unmanned aerial systems (UAS) and autonomy solutions. Aurora collaborates with NASA, DARPA, and the U.S. military to prototype and build next-generation aerospace technologies.

=== Advanced Aircraft Company ===
Based in Hampton, Virginia, Advanced Aircraft Company develops hybrid-electric vertical takeoff and landing (VTOL) drones for long-endurance applications in defense and commercial markets. The company emphasizes sustainability and modularity in aerospace design.

=== Electra.aero ===
Electra is developing electric short takeoff and landing (eSTOL) aircraft for regional travel. Based in Northern Virginia, Electra's aircraft are designed to operate from spaces as short as 300 feet and are targeted for urban and rural air mobility.

=== Luna Innovations ===
Headquartered in Roanoke, Luna Innovations develops fiber-optic sensing and measurement technologies used in aerospace structures. Their systems monitor aircraft integrity, thermal loads, and vibrations to improve flight safety and performance.

=== ENSCO, Inc. ===
ENSCO, based in Fairfax County, Virginia, provides engineering and cybersecurity solutions for aerospace, rail, and national defense. Its aerospace division supports launch range instrumentation, space situational awareness, and flight safety systems.

== Airports ==
=== International ===
- Washington Dulles International Airport (IAD) – Located in Dulles, it is the primary international gateway for the Washington, D.C. metropolitan area and Virginia.
- Ronald Reagan Washington National Airport (DCA) – While primarily serving domestic flights, it offers limited international service to destinations in Canada and the Caribbean.
- Richmond International Airport (RIC) – Provides some international service, primarily seasonal and to Caribbean destinations.
- Norfolk International Airport (ORF) – Offers limited international charter services.

=== Regional ===
- Roanoke–Blacksburg Regional Airport (ROA) – Serves the Roanoke Valley and southwestern Virginia with regional connections.
- Charlottesville–Albemarle Airport (CHO) – Provides service to major hubs via regional carriers.
- Lynchburg Regional Airport (LYH) – Serves central Virginia with limited commercial flights.
- Shenandoah Valley Regional Airport (SHD) – Offers Essential Air Service (EAS)-subsidized flights to larger hubs.

=== General Aviation ===
Virginia hosts numerous general aviation airports that serve private pilots, flight schools, and charter operations. Notable facilities include:

- Manassas Regional Airport (HEF) – One of the busiest general aviation airports in the state.
- Leesburg Executive Airport (JYO) – Serves the D.C. metro area with GA and corporate aviation.
- Chesapeake Regional Airport (CPK)
- Virginia Highlands Airport (VJI) in Abingdon

=== Military and Government Only ===
- Langley Air Force Base – Located in Hampton, it is one of the oldest airfields in the U.S. Air Force.
- Naval Air Station Oceana – A major Navy fighter base located in Virginia Beach.
- Fort Belvoir Davison Army Airfield – Supports U.S. Army and government aviation near Washington, D.C.
- Quantico Marine Corps Air Facility – Supports Marine Corps operations in northern Virginia.
- Joint Base Langley–Eustis – A consolidated military base supporting both the Air Force and Army.

== People ==
- David M. Brown, Astronaut from Arlington, Virginia who flew in STS-107 mission.
- Richard E. Byrd, Polar aviator

== Organizations ==
=== Virginia Aeronautical Historical Society ===
The Virginia Aeronautical Historical Society (VAHS), established in 1978, is a nonprofit organization dedicated to preserving and promoting the rich aviation history of Virginia. Through exhibits, educational programs, and events, the society celebrates the achievements and contributions of individuals in the field of aeronautics. The VAHS operates from its headquarters in Fredericksburg, Virginia, and collaborates with various institutions to disseminate knowledge about the state's aviation heritage.

=== Virginia Airport Operators Council ===
The Virginia Airport Operators Council (VAOC) represents the collective interests of the owners, operators, and users of Virginia's 66 public-use airports. The council provides a unified voice to state and federal agencies, the Virginia General Assembly, and the United States Congress on proposed or pending legislation and regulations. VAOC also offers educational opportunities, supports scholarships, and organizes annual aviation conferences and workshops to promote best practices in airport operations and management.

== Government and Military ==
=== Federal Oversight ===
All flight operations in Virginia fall under the jurisdiction of the Federal Aviation Administration (FAA), which regulates U.S. airspace, certifies pilots and aircraft, enforces safety standards, and manages air traffic control services.

=== Virginia Department of Aviation ===
The Virginia Department of Aviation (DOAV), established in 1979, is the Commonwealth’s primary agency for aviation development and policy. It is headquartered at Richmond International Airport. The DOAV promotes aviation safety, supports airport infrastructure, and provides grants and technical assistance to public-use airports across the state.

DOAV also supports STEM education, workforce development, and promotes aerospace careers through its aviation ambassador programs, scholarships, and outreach events.

=== Virginia Air National Guard ===
The Virginia Air National Guard (VaANG) is the aerial component of the Virginia National Guard and an Air Reserve Component of the United States Air Force. It was established in 1947 and is headquartered at Joint Base Langley–Eustis in Hampton, Virginia. The primary unit, the 192nd Wing, operates alongside active-duty units of Air Combat Command, contributing to national defense missions and domestic emergency responses.

The VaANG has supported global operations including Operation Iraqi Freedom and Operation Enduring Freedom, and also provides domestic emergency assistance during hurricanes, civil unrest, and other crises.

=== Civil Air Patrol – Virginia Wing ===
The Virginia Wing of the Civil Air Patrol (CAP) is the state's official volunteer auxiliary of the U.S. Air Force. Headquartered in Richmond, the Wing oversees 22 squadrons and over 2,000 cadet and adult members across the Commonwealth.

Its three core missions are emergency services, cadet programs, and aerospace education. The Virginia Wing performs search and rescue operations, aerial photography for disaster response, and supports the Air Force with light transport and communications. CAP cadets participate in leadership training, STEM-focused aerospace education, and physical fitness programs, while adult members contribute professional expertise to missions statewide.

== Museums ==
- Virginia Aviation Museum Richmond.
- Steven F. Udvar-Hazy Center, part of the National Air and Space Museum, opened 2003
- Virginia Air and Space Center in Hampton, Virginia
- Air Power Park in Hampton, Virginia

== Gallery ==
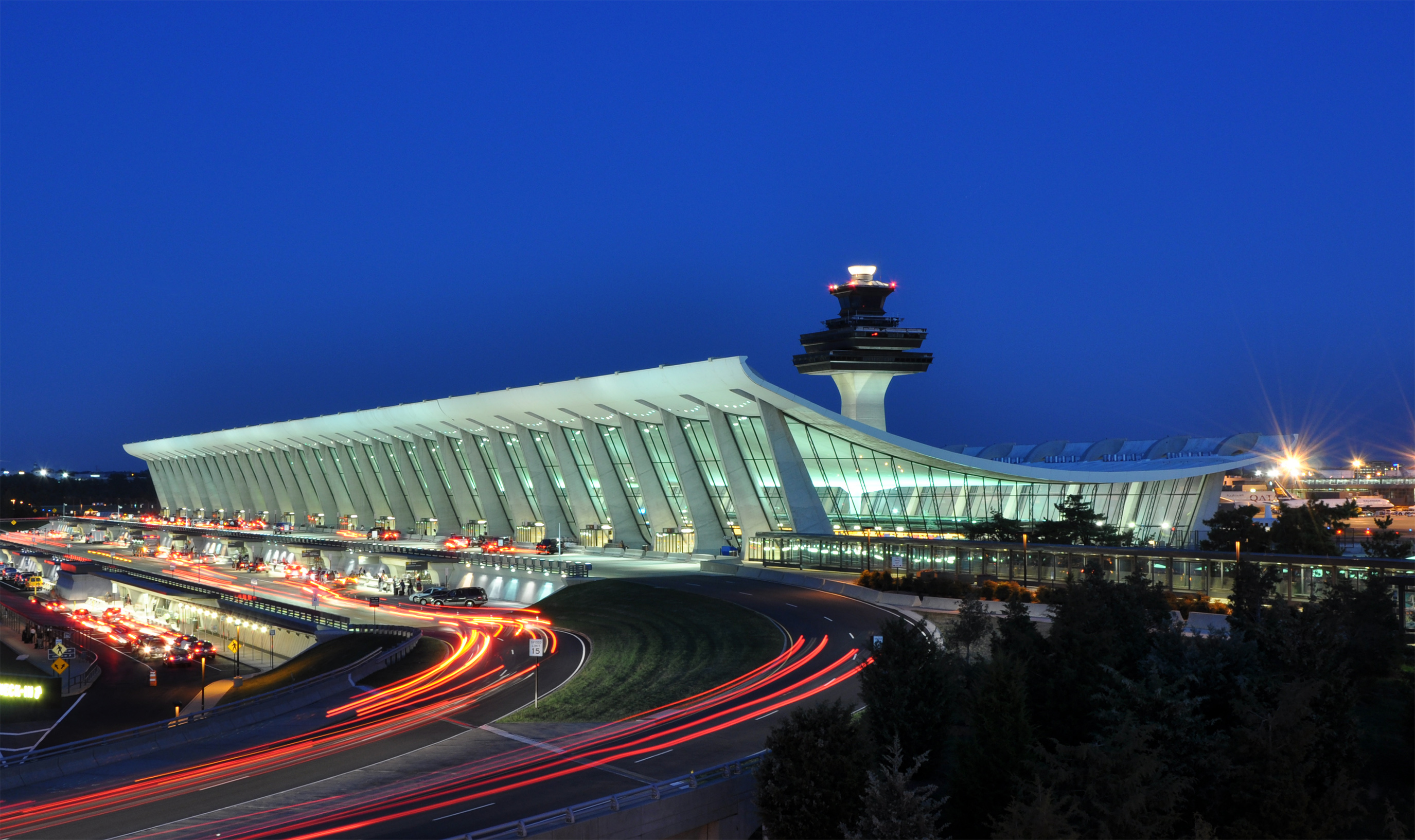
Dulles International Airport
