= Sean Connaughton =

American government official (born 1961)

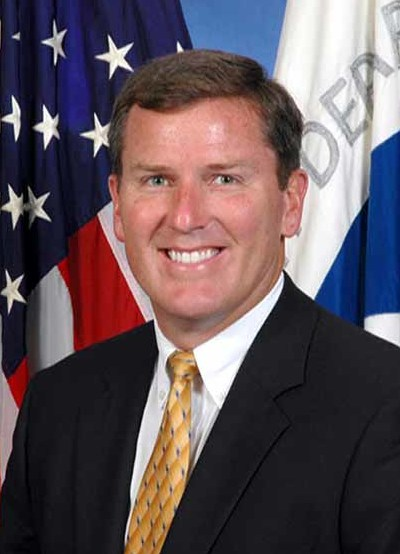
- Connaughton in 2006

12th Virginia Secretary of Transportation
- In office January 16, 2010 – January 11, 2014
- Governor: Bob McDonnell
- Preceded by: Pierce Homer
- Succeeded by: Aubrey Layne

United States Maritime Administrator
- In office September 6, 2006 – January 20, 2009
- President: George W. Bush
- Preceded by: John E. Jamian
- Succeeded by: David T. Matsuda

Chair of the Prince William Board of County Supervisors
- In office January 1, 2000 – September 6, 2006
- Preceded by: Kathleen Seefeldt
- Succeeded by: Corey Stewart

Personal details
- Born: Sean Thomas Connaughton; February 25, 1961 (age 65) Brooklyn, New York, U.S.
- Party: Republican
- Spouse: Teresa Voda
- Education: United States Merchant Marine Academy; George Mason University

Military service
- Allegiance: United States
- Branch/service: United States Coast Guard United States Navy Reserve
- Years of service: 1986–2006

Sean Thomas Connaughton (born February 25, 1961) is an American attorney who was the Secretary of Transportation for the Commonwealth of Virginia from 2010 until 2014. He served as the Administrator of the United States Maritime Administration, an agency of the United States Department of Transportation, from 2006 until early 2009. Connaughton served as Chairman of the Prince William Board of County Supervisors from January 1, 2000, until his appointment as Maritime Administrator. He is also a lawyer, unsuccessful 2005 Republican candidate for Lieutenant Governor of Virginia, former United States Coast Guard officer, and a retired officer of the United States Naval Reserve. He was confirmed as Maritime Administrator by the Senate on August 3, 2006.

President George W. Bush nominated Connaughton to serve as Commissioner of the Federal Maritime Commission. Congress did not take up the nomination. He left federal service to work as the Corporate Vice President of Government Affairs for the American Bureau of Shipping. Connaughton became the Secretary of Transportation in the Cabinet of Governor Bob McDonnell in January 2010.

== Education ==
Connaughton is a 1979 graduate of Chaminade High School in Mineola, New York. He received a B.Sc. from the United States Merchant Marine Academy in 1983 and a J.D. degree from George Mason University in 1992. Connaughton also has a Masters in Public Administration from Georgetown University and is a graduate of the Naval War College.

== Career ==
Immediately upon graduation from the United States Merchant Marine Academy, Connaughton accepted a Commission as an Officer in the United States Coast Guard, remaining on Active Duty until 1986 when he joined the United States Naval Reserve. He became a civilian employee of the Coast Guard in the marine safety and environmental protection area. He then worked at the American Petroleum Institute during the Exxon Valdez calamity and went to law school at night. Connaughton entered private legal practice in 1992. His legal career is highlighted by his service as Co-counsel on the case Intertanko v. Locke, winning a unanimous decision before the United States Supreme Court

=== Chairman of the Prince William Board of County Supervisors ===
Connaughton was elected Chairman of the Prince William Board of County Supervisors in November 1999, defeating the incumbent, Democrat Kathleen K. Seefeldt. He was re-elected to a second four-year term, beginning January 1, 2004. He resigned that position on September 6, 2006.

The Washington Post characterized Connaghton as a "pragmatist" during his tenure. Connaughton capped the growth of all real estate taxes at 5.9%, despite double-digit growth in real estate value and the jurisdiction achieved a AAA Bond Rating. He also successfully campaigned to bring AOL, General Dynamics, Comcast, Eli Lilly and other major employers to Prince William.

=== Maritime Administration ===
In September 2006, Connaughton assumed the helm of the Maritime Administration. He focused on laying the foundation for a marine highways system, greater opportunities for American mariners, and a reorganization of the agency to make it more effective are significant steps he's taken during his watch. During his tenure Connaughton was consistently cited as one of the best Federal transportation policy leaders by Members of Congress, industry and the media.

Connaughton received several awards and recognitions for his service as Administrator, including: Vincent T. Hirsh Maritime Award for Outstanding Leadership by the Navy League of the United States (2009), "Maritime Person of the Year" by the Propeller Club of the United States (2007), "Maritime Samaritan Award" from the Apostleship of the Sea of the United States (2009) and "Government Man of the Year" by the Maritime Port Council of Greater New York (2007). Additionally, the Journal of Commerce named him to its 2008 "JOC Leadership Roll". Connaughton's service was also recognized by the Massachusetts Maritime Academy in 2007 through the awarding of an Honorary Doctorate in Public Administration.

=== Virginia Secretary of Transportation ===
On December 22, 2009, Virginia Governor-elect Bob McDonnell announced Sean Connaughton as his appointment to Secretary of Transportation for the Commonwealth of Virginia. He was sworn into office on January 16, 2010. As Secretary, Connaughton oversees seven agencies with over 10,000 employees and combined budgets of more than $5 billion. After taking office, he initiated multiple audits of the Virginia Department of Transportation which identified more than $1.4B of misallocated funds that were then deployed to advance stalled projects. Connaughton led efforts to grow private investment in the Commonwealth's aging infrastructure system by establishing a new P3 Office, streamlining the Public-Private Transportation Act process and recognizing innovative financing opportunities. Under his leadership, a state investment of less than $600 million has been leveraged into over $3 billion worth of infrastructure, ranking Virginia #2 worldwide for P3 deals. He has overseen the creation of the Virginia Transportation Infrastructure Bank, providing a resource that public-and private-sector entities can use to finance projects and accelerate construction. Most critically, Connaughton is credited with enabling passage of Virginia's Road to the Future, the first comprehensive transportation funding bill approved in the Commonwealth in 27 years. His efforts secured a historic bipartisan compromise in the Virginia General Assembly, resulting in a tax reform package that boosted projected transportation revenues $7B over the next 6 years by diversifying the revenue base away from declining gas tax to greater reliance on sales tax funding.

=== Virginia Hospital and Healthcare Association ===
Since leaving government in 2014, Connaughton has been President and CEO of the Virginia Hospital and Healthcare Association in Richmond, Virginia. The Association has as its members all of Virginia's hospitals and health systems and represents them before the federal and state governments, as well as providing safety, quality, educational, population health and emergency preparedness services. Connaughton was instrumental in Virginia's passage of Medicaid expansion in 2018 and was a leader in Virginia's response and recovery to the COVID-19 pandemic.

Connaughton is currently the Chair of the Board of Directors of the 9/11 Pentagon Memorial Fund and its drive to build a Visitor Center for the 9/11 Pentagon Memorial. He is also Lifeguard Member at George Washington's Mount Vernon.

Political offices
Preceded by Kathleen Seefeldt	Chairman of the Prince William Board of County Supervisors; 1999 – 2006	Succeeded by Corey A. Stewart
