= Kathleen Seefeldt =

American politician

Chair of the Prince William Board of County Supervisors
- In office January 1, 1992 – December 31, 1999
- Preceded by: At-large seat established
- Succeeded by: Sean T. Connaughton

Personal details
- Born: November 12, 1934 (age 91) Minnesota, U.S.
- Party: Democratic
- Spouse: Robert Seefeldt (m. 1962; died 2020)

Kathleen Kenna Seefeldt (born November 12, 1934) is an American politician who served as Chairman of the Prince William Board of County Supervisors from 1992 to 1999. She is a Democrat.

== Personal ==
Born in Minnesota, Seefeldt earned her undergraduate degree from St. Scholastica College (1956) and did graduate work at Boston University. With Robert A. Seefeldt, her husband, she moved to Prince William County in 1970. They reside in Woodbridge and Chincoteague, Virginia. She is a mother and grandmother who gives stain removal advice and reads for pleasure.

== Board of Supervisors ==
Kathleen Seefeldt was first elected to the Prince William Board of County Supervisors in 1975, and served as the Occoquan District Supervisor from 1976 to 1991. In 1991, she was elected the first at-large Chairman of the Board. Previously, the Chairman had been elected by the Board from among its membership. When Seefeldt took office as Chairman in 1992, she assumed the Board's eighth seat, the first time the Board had grown since it was enlarged to seven Supervisors in 1967.

During her tenure on the Board, she was a fairly strong advocate for greater growth and development in the County, which was still very rural when she first entered office in 1976. She was instrumental in the construction of the Prince William Parkway, a stretch of which bears her name. The Parkway, begun in 1990, provided a major arterial thoroughfare connecting the county's eastern and western ends, beginning at Interstate 95 near Woodbridge and continuing on through Dale City to Manassas. Later additions to the Parkway included an eastern extension providing a link-up with US Route 1 and a western extension that connected with Interstate 66 and those parts of the county west of Manassas.

In 1988, Seefeldt became involved in a battle between the National Park Service and real estate development company Hazel/Peterson over the proposed construction of a large, regional shopping mall near the Manassas National Battlefield Park. Seefeldt expressed concerns over the environmental and traffic impact of the proposed development, but supported the mall as a strong economic development tool, one that might compete with the large, popular, and profitable Tysons Corner Center in neighboring Fairfax County. Relations between Seefeldt and the Park Service soon deteriorated over longstanding county government concerns regarding the Park Service's stewardship of the Manassas Battlefield and the Park Service's opposition to the new mall. Ultimately, the mall was never built.

Mrs. Seefeldt lost reelection to a third term in 1999 to Republican Sean Connaughton who successfully targeted her as the architect of the County's burgeoning growth. Development that was once welcome had brought greater traffic and placed a strain on county services, fueling voter disenchantment in a historic election; the Democrats lost control of the Virginia General Assembly for the first time in a century. In Prince William County, once the Democrats' bastion in Northern Virginia, the County Sheriff, Commonwealth's Attorney, and two members of the Board of Supervisors were the only Democrats left in County Government.

Seefeldt was the last Democrat to chair Prince William County's government, despite the county's gradual and increasing return to the Democratic fold in presidential and gubernatorial elections until Ann Wheeler twenty years later won in the 2019 Virginia elections a Democratic Party majority of 5-3 on the County Board—the first time since Seefeldt's departure that Democrats held a majority on the governing board of Virginia's third largest local government.

== Prince William Parkway ==
In April 2001, a portion of the Prince William Parkway was dedicated as the "Kathleen K. Seefeldt Parkway". The portion named after Seefeldt stretches from I-95 to the intersection of Liberia and Fairview Avenues near Manassas; this segment is the original Parkway and was completed entirely during Seefeldt's tenure as Chairman. Mrs. Seefeldt was a key force in securing the parkway, and its unusual (for Virginia), mix of local with state financing. Stone monuments to Seefeldt can be found at the intersection of the Parkway and Davis Ford Road (no longer an arterial road) and again at the intersection of the Parkway and the border with the City of Manassas.

== Other public service, politics ==
- 1986 Governor Gerald Baliles appointed her to the Commission on Transportation
- 1990 Governor Doug Wilder appointed her to the Virginia Advisory Commission on Intergovernmental Relations
- 1992 Joined the Transportation Coordinating Council for Northern Virginia and was a member of its executive committee
- 1996–1998 Western Transportation Corridor MIS Policy Advisory Committee
- 1998 Joined the Northern Virginia 2020 Transportation Plan Policy Advisory Committee
- 1999 United States Department of Transportation – National Capital Region Congestion and Mobility Task Force
- 1992–1999 represented the County on the Metropolitan Washington Council of Governments’ Transportation Planning Board
- 1985 Joined Virginia Association of Counties board of directors
- 1992 Elected president, Virginia Association of Counties
- 1999 Elected as vice chairman of the Virginia Municipal League’s Legislative Committee and Transportation Policy Committee
- 1998–1999 Chairman of the Potomac and Rappahannock Transportation Commission
- 2003–2007 Chairman of Virginia's Commission on Local Government under governors Mark Warner and Tim Kaine.
- 2006–2008 Board of Supervisors appointed her to the County's Future Commission 2030. The board adopted their report in early in 2008.
- 2008 Hillary Clinton Virginia Women’s Steering Committee

== Civic and community organizations ==
- Chambers of Commerce
- Girl Scouts of the USA
- Boy Scouts of America
- NAACP
- American Heart Association
- Prince William Boys’ and Girls’ Clubs

== Awards and commendations ==
- Prince William Chamber of Commerce Community Service Award
- Potomac News Citizen of the Year
- Woodbridge Soroptimists Woman of the Year
- several distinguished public service recognitions

Political offices
Preceded by Unknown	Chairman of the Prince William Board of County Supervisors; 1992 – 1999	Succeeded by Sean T. Connaughton
