= George Washington High School (Danville, Virginia) =

Location
- 701 Broad Street; Danville, Virginia 24541
- Coordinates: 36°35′09″N 79°24′46″W

Information
- School type: Public high school
- Founded: 1927
- School district: Danville City Public Schools
- Principal: Johnny Cressell
- Grades: 9–12
- Enrollment: 1,353 (2016–17)
- Colors: Silver, Navy Blue
- Mascot: Eagle
- Website: George Washington High School

George Washington High School is a secondary school of Danville, Virginia. It is a member of the Piedmont District, Conference 23 in the 4A classification. The school has approximately 1400 students and 200 staff. The school mascot has been the Eagle since 1970/71 school year (previously being the Cardinal), upon the school's merger with John M. Langston High School.

== Athletics ==
Both George Washington boys' and girls' basketball teams have won the Western Valley district championship numerous times. The boys' basketball team won the state championship in 1933, 1996 and 1998 and finished nationally ranked both of the 96 and 98 seasons. The 1985 Girls Basketball team won the States Championship. The 1996 team finished the season ranked #4 in the USA Today Final Poll with a record of 28-0. The 1998 team finished the season ranked #22 in the USA Today Final Poll with a record of 27-1. Most recently, the boys' team won the 2019 Class 4 State Championship game and finished with a record of 27-2. The GW golf team has won the state championship five times. The GW baseball team have won the state title five times (1926, 1928, 1931, 1953, 1954). The boys' track & field team has had many state champions and even national champions. Football has brought state titles to GWHS in 1944, 1968, and 1982. Football has also produced a few undefeated regular seasons teams, the most recent being in 2014 finishing with a 10-0 record. The football team has also produced many collegiate and professional players, including Buddy Curry, David Wilson, Ferrell Edmunds, and Herman Moore.

== Notable alumni ==
- Mike Brim- former NFL player
- Buddy Curry – Former NFL Player. University of North Carolina.
- Jon Dalton, reality TV show participant also known as "Jonny Fairplay"
- Traci DeShazor – Virginia Secretary of Administration
- Ferrell Edmunds – former NFL Player. Father of the Edmunds Brothers, Trey, Tremaine, and Terrell.
- Calvin W. Fowler – former member of the Virginia House of Delegates
- Stokeley Fulton – Hampden–Sydney College football coach
- Willard B. Gatewood, history professor and author
- J. Hartwell Harrison – surgical team member in world’s premiere kidney transplant
- Kenny Lewis – Former NFL Player
- Herman Moore – Former NFL Player, former University of Virginia football player. He was a 4 time Pro-Bowl player in the NFL. He also led the NFL in receptions in 1995 and 1997.
- Johnny Newman – Former NBA Player. University of Richmond.
- Nate Poole – Former NFL Player. Marshall University.
- Tyrone Robertson – Former NFL Player
- Donald Smith - former NFL and CFL player. Two time Grey Cup champion and all-star.
- Skipp Sudduth - Actor
- David Wilson - running back and 2012 1st round pick for the New York Giants, former Virginia Tech football and track & field All-American
- Darroll Wilson - Former Professional Heavyweight Boxer
