= Robert E. Martinez =

American politician

8th Virginia Secretary of Transportation
- In office 1994–1998
- Governor: George Allen
- Preceded by: John G. Milliken
- Succeeded by: Shirley Ybarra

Associate Deputy Secretary of Transportation
- In office 1992–1993
- President: George H. W. Bush

Personal details
- Born: Robert Esteban Martinez; November 22, 1955 (age 70) Havana, Cuba
- Party: Republican
- Education: Columbia College (BA); Yale University (PhD)

Robert Esteban Martinez (born November 22, 1955) is an American politician who served under governor George Allen as the 8th Virginia Secretary of Transportation. He also served as Deputy Administrator for the United States Maritime Administration and was named by President George H. W. Bush to Associate Deputy Secretary of Transportation and Director of the Office of Intermodalism.

== Biography ==
Martinez was born on November 22, 1955, in Havana, Cuba. His father was the comptroller of an American-owned sugar plantation near Cuba's southeastern coast. His family fled Cuba on a tourist visa in 1960 and sought refuge in Canada, and later in the United States. He received a B.A. from Columbia College in 1977 and a PhD from Yale Graduate School of Arts and Sciences in 1984.

From 1978 to 1980, he was a program analyst at the United States Department of Labor. Between 1983 and 1984, he was an associate consultant with Multinational Strategies Inc., New York. From 1983 to 1990, he was associated with The Business Roundtable, an association of 200 chief executive officers of major companies that follows public policy issues, including trade and investment, budget, taxes and health care, and served as its assistant executive director.

In April 1990, he was nominated by United States Secretary of Transportation Samuel Skinner to serve as deputy administrator of the United States Maritime Administration. In this position, he managed the sealifts during the Operation Desert Shield/Desert Storm.

In 1992, he was nominated by President Bush to be Associate Deputy Secretary of Transportation and was confirmed by the United States Senate by Unanimous consent.

He began working for Norfolk Southern Railway in 1993 but left in 1994 to join Virginia governor George Allen's cabinet as Secretary of Transportation. In this position, he had oversight over the Virginia Department of Transportation (highways), the Department of Rail and Public Transportation, the Virginia Department of Aviation, the Department of Motor Vehicles, and Virginia Port Authority. Martínez returned to Norfolk Southern in early 1998, where he now serves as Vice President of Business Development and Real Estate.

== Personal life ==
Martinez is married to Cristina Martinez, who he met in 1981 while doing graduate work in Madrid. He and his wife reside in Norfolk, Virginia, and are active members of the Roman Catholic Diocese of Richmond.
