= Virginia Secretary of Health and Human Resources =

Governmental office of health and human resources in Virginia, USA

- Seal of the Commonwealth of Virginia

- Flag of Virginia
- Incumbent; Marvin B. Figueroa since January 18, 2025
- Style: Mr. Secretary
- Member of: Virginia Governor's Cabinet
- Nominator: The governor
- Appointer: The governor with advice and consent from the Senate and House
- Term length: 4 years
- Inaugural holder: Otis L. Brown (as Secretary of Human Affairs)
- Formation: April 8, 1972
- Website: hhr.virginia.gov

The secretary of health and human resources is a member of the Virginia Governor's Cabinet. The current Secretary is Marvin B. Figueroa, appointed by Governor Abigail Spanberger.

== Duties ==
The Secretary oversees all healthcare in Virginia and Virginia's system of social services. The following agencies report to the Secretary:

- Virginia Assistive Technology Loan Authority
- Virginia Board for People With Disabilities
- Virginia Department for Aging and Rehabilitative Services
- Virginia Department of Behavioral Health and Developmental Services
- Virginia Department for the Blind and Vision Impaired
- Virginia Department for the Deaf and Hard of Hearing
- Virginia Department of Health
- Virginia Department of Health Professions
- Virginia Department of Medical Assistance Services
- Virginia Department of Social Services
- Virginia Office of Children's Services
- Virginia Foundation for Healthy Youth

== List of secretaries ==
=== Human Affairs (July 1, 1972–1976) ===
- Otis L. Brown (1972–1976)

=== Human Resources (1976–1988) ===
- Otis L. Brown (1976–1977)
- Jean L. Harris (1978–1982)
- Joseph L. Fisher (1982–1986)
- Eva S. Hardy (1986–1988)

=== Health and Human Resources (1988–present) ===
- Eva S. Hardy (1988–1990)
- Howard Cullum (1990–1993)
- Kay Coles James (1994–1996)
- Robert C. Metcalf (1996–1998)
- Claude Allen (1998–2001)
- Louis Rossiter (2001–2002)
- Jane Woods (2002–2006)
- Marilyn Tavenner (2006–2010)
- Bill Hazel (2010–2018)
- Daniel Carey (2018–2021)
- Vanessa Walker Harris (2021-2022)
- John Littel (2022-2024)
- Janet Vestal Kelly (2024-2026)
- Marvin B. Figueroa (2026-present)
