= DOAV =

DOAV may refer to:

- German and Austrian Alpine Club (Deutscher und Österreichischer Alpenverein), a defunct German/Austrian climbing organization
- Virginia Department of Aviation, the executive branch agency of the state government responsible for aviation in the state of Virginia in the United States
