= Viola Baskerville =

American politician

14th Virginia Secretary of Administration
- In office January 14, 2006 – January 16, 2010
- Governor: Tim Kaine
- Preceded by: Sandra Bowen
- Succeeded by: Lisa Hicks-Thomas

Member of the Virginia House of Delegates from the 71st district
- In office January 14, 1998 – May 2005
- Preceded by: Jean W. Cunningham
- Succeeded by: Jennifer McClellan

Personal details
- Born: Viola Osborne Baskerville; October 29, 1951 (age 74) Richmond, Virginia, U.S.
- Party: Democratic
- Spouse: Archer Baskerville
- Education: College of William & Mary; University of Iowa

Viola Osborne Baskerville (born October 29, 1951) is a Virginia lawyer and politician who served in the Virginia House of Delegates from 1998 to 2005 and as Secretary of Administration in the Cabinet of Virginia Governor Tim Kaine from 2006 to 2010.

== Biography ==
Viola Baskerville was born in Richmond, Virginia. Her educational background includes a B.A. degree from the College of William and Mary earned in 1973, and a J.D. degree from the University of Iowa College of Law earned in 1979. Furthermore, she also studied abroad on a Fulbright Fellowship in Bonn, Germany.

Prior to her appointment as Secretary of Administration, Baskerville served on the Richmond, Virginia City Council from 1994 to 1997, including a stint as the city's Vice Mayor under then-Mayor Tim Kaine. Following her tenure as Vice Mayor, she was elected to the Virginia House of Delegates, serving from 1998 to 2005. In the 2005 election, she became the first African-American woman to seek the Democratic Party nomination for Lieutenant Governor of Virginia, coming in second place in the four-way primary behind State Senator Leslie Byrne, but ahead of State Delegate Chap Petersen, and State Senator Phillip Puckett. Following the 2005 general election, she served as Co-chair of Governor Tim Kaine's Transition Team, and was succeeded in the State House by Democrat Jennifer McClellan.

As Secretary of Administration in the Virginia Governor's Cabinet, Baskerville was responsible for overseeing several state government agencies including the Virginia State Board of Elections, the Department of General Services, the Department of Human Resources Management, and the Department of Minority Business Enterprise. She was the only African-American woman to serve in Governor Kaine's Cabinet.

Baskerville was succeeded as Virginia Secretary of Administration by Lisa Hicks-Thomas in January, 2010, and was subsequently appointed as CEO of the Girl Scouts of Virginia.

Virginia House of Delegates
Preceded by Jean W. Cunningham	Virginia Delegate for the 71st District; 1998–2005	Succeeded by Jennifer McClellan
Political offices
Preceded by Sandra Bowen	Virginia Secretary of Administration; 2006–2010	Succeeded by Lisa Hicks-Thomas
