= Willard B. Gatewood =

American historian

Willard Badgett Gatewood Jr. (February 23, 1931 - October 23, 2011) was a history professor emeritus at the University of Arkansas and an author.

Gatewood was born on a tobacco farm along Park Springs Road in Caswell County, North Carolina. He graduated from George Washington High School in Danville, Virginia. He studied at Duke University where he received his undergraduate, graduate, and doctoral degrees.

He served as Chancellor of the University of Arkansas in 1984 and 1985. He helped establish the University of Arkansas Press. He served as president of the Southern Historical Association.

The Amistad Research Center at Tulane University in Louisiana has a few of his papers. The Southern Elite and Social Change; Essays in Honor of Willard B. Gatewood, Jr. was published in 2002.

== Written works ==
- Slave And Freeman; The Autobiography of George L. Knox, editor (2014)
- Aristocrats of Color: The Black Elite, 1880-1920"
- Arkansas Delta: Land of Paradox
- "The Remarkable Misses Rollin: Black Women in Reconstruction South Carolina", South Carolina Historical Magazine Vol. 92, No. 3 (July 1991), pages 172-188 South Carolina Historical Society
- Black Americans and the White Man's Burden 1898–1903, University of Illinois Press (1975)
- "Smoked Yankees" and the Struggle for Empire: Letters from Negro Soldiers, 1898–1902 (1971)
- Theodore Roosevelt and the Art of Controversy; Episodes of the White House Years (1970)
- America Interpreted: A Concise History with Interpretive Readings, co-author
- "The Rediscovery of Local History" (1975)
- Controversy in the Twenties; Fundamentalism, Modernism, and Evolution Vanderbilt University Press 1969
- From Slavery to Wealth, The Lifeof Acott Bond, editor
- "The South, the State University and the Regional Promise" (1977)
- Woodrow Wilson and the University of Arkansas Argus Printers (1971)
