= Virginia Board of Health =

- Seal of the Commonwealth of Virginia

Agency overview
- Jurisdiction: Virginia
- Headquarters: Richmond, Virginia
- Agency executives: Melissa Nelson, MD, Chair; Cindy Warriner, Vice Chair
- Website: https://www.vdh.virginia.gov/commissioner/board-of-health/

The Virginia Board of Health is a 15-member independent agency that regulates health facilities in the Commonwealth of Virginia. It provides oversight and policy-making for the Virginia Department of Health. Members serve four-year terms and are appointed by the Governor of Virginia. In the politics of Virginia, the board is notable for playing a prominent role in abortion access issues.

== Organization ==
The board is appointed by the Governor for four-year terms. Members may not serve more than two consecutive terms. The law specifies:

Two members of the Board shall be members of the Medical Society of Virginia, one member shall be a member of the Virginia Pharmaceutical Association, one member shall be a member of the State Dental Association, one member shall be a member of the Virginia Nurses' Association, one member shall be a member of the Virginia Veterinary Medical Association, one member shall be a representative of local government, one member shall be a representative of the hospital industry, one member shall be a representative of the nursing home industry, one member shall be a representative of the licensed health carriers responsible under Title 38.2 for a managed care health insurance plan, one member shall be a corporate purchaser of health care, two members shall be consumers, one member shall have public environmental health expertise, and one member shall be a representative of the emergency medical services community recommended by the State Emergency Medical Services Advisory Board.

It holds four or five meetings each year with at least one meeting in Richmond, but usually holds the rest in cities around the state.

== Duties ==
In many ways, the Board is the policy-making arm of the Virginia Department of Health and the law gives the Board a variety of important duties. The Board establishes the framework for Virginia's public health services. The Board also approves regulations for the Department of Health and can grant exemptions from those regulations. This includes regulations governing research using human subjects.

Regarding health care access and economics, the Board sets the income limitations on medically indigent patients and sets the charges to be paid for the medical care services of the Department. It works with the Virginia Health Planning Board to consider issues of health care policy and financing and issues formal studies on these subject.

The Board leads Virginia's role in fighting AIDS. The Board administers Virginia's AIDS services and education grants program with funds appropriated by the General Assembly. The Board also provides grants to operate up to five regional AIDS resource and consultation centers and two pilot treatment centers.

The Board promotes health education and outreach. For example, The Board sets the Department of Health's program of patient and community health education services to include services addressing health promotion and disease prevention, and encouraging the coordination of local and private sector health education services. The Board also awards grants for Virginia's worksite health promotion program with funds appropriated by the General Assembly.

The Board has the emergency authority to issue "orders and regulations to meet any emergency, not provided for by general regulations, for the purpose of suppressing nuisances dangerous to the public health and communicable, contagious and infectious diseases and other dangers to the public life and health."

=== Regulation of abortion facilities ===
Historically, the regulation of abortion facilities never played a prominent role in the Board's work. The Board did regulate abortion clinics from 1981 until 1984, when Governor Chuck Robb ordered an end to the regulation of outpatient clinics. From 1991 to 2010, bills introduced into the Virginia General Assembly proposed to regulate outpatient abortion clinics, but they failed to be enacted.

In 2010, Virginia Attorney General Ken Cuccinelli issued a non-binding legal opinion that would allow the Board to regulate outpatient abortion clinics as if they were hospital facilities called "ambulatory surgical centers." At that time, 11 of the Board members were appointed by the prior Governor Tim Kaine, and the Board did not act on Cuccinelli's opinion letter.

The 2011 session of the General Assembly expanded the Board's power to regulate clinics which provide five or more first-trimester abortions per month and required the Board to issue regulations within 280 days. By this time, Governor Bob McDonnell had appointed six of the Board members, with the ability to fill two more seats in July 2011. Among McDonnell's appointees as consumer representative is a donor and supporter of the Family Foundation of Virginia, a group which opposes abortions.

=== Controversy ===
In June of 2022, the Virginia Board of Health unanimously voted to reprimand Health Commissioner Colin Greene for making remarks that dismissed evidence of structural racism in health outcomes and for saying gun violence is a political talking point. The board says his comments damaged the health department, its employees and marginalized communities. After interviewing Greene, the board members passed a resolution expressing their “embarrassment” over his comments and recommended that he cease questioning “basic scientific facts regarding disparities.”

== Current Membership ==
As of June 2026, the Board currently has 15 members, all serving four year terms.

Name	Representing
Melissa Nelson, Chair	Medical Society of Virginia
Cynthia Warriner, Vice Chair	Virginia Pharmacists Association
Kevin Dillard	Emergency Medical Services
Michael Desjaden	Corporate Purchaser of Health Care
Thomasena Wicker	Consumer
Julie Henderson	Public Environmental Health
James Cole	Hospital Industry
Douglas Daniels	Virginia Veterinary Medicine Association
Saquib Samee	Consumer
Wendy Walter	Nursing Home Industry
Pam Cipriano	Virginia Nurses Association
Lee Jones	Virginia Dental Association
Gina Bellamy	Local Government
Ann B.R. Vaughters	Managed Health Care Insurance Plans
Walter Vest	Medical Society of Virginia
