= Virginia Society for Human Life =

American anti-abortion organization

- Formation: 1967
- Headquarters: Richmond, VA
- President: Olivia Gans Turner
- Website: vshl.org

The Virginia Society for Human Life (VSHL) is a non-profit organization advocating an end to abortion in Virginia and the United States. VSHL is the Virginia affiliate of the National Right to Life Committee. It was founded in 1967 and is the oldest organization of this type in the country. The group has a political action committee, VSHL PAC, to support pro-life candidates for Virginia public office. Olivia Gans Turner is the current president of VSHL and the Director of the American Victims of Abortion (AVA).

== Activities ==
VSHL works opposes abortion, embryonic stem cell research, and euthanasia in Virginia with the ultimate goal of ending those practices in the state and nationwide. It lobbies for legislation to criminalize abortion and against reproductive rights legislation in the Virginia General Assembly. VSHL president Olivia Gans Turner claimed that during Virginia General Assembly sessions, VSHL has a team of two to three people lobbying the General Assembly.

In 2011, VSHL was involved in the passage of a bill to regulate abortion clinics as "ambulatory surgical centers". The bill, which passed the House by a large margin and passed the Senate after a tiebreaker vote from Lieutenant Governor Bill Bolling, contributed to the closure of three of the state's 21 abortion clinics between its enactment in 2011 and the Virginia Board of Health's 2015 vote to end the hospital-style regulations for abortion clinics.

In August 2012, VSHL started a pro-life youth camp called Camp Joshua that is part of the Life & Leadership Camps Initiative developed by the National Right to Life anti-abortion program. VSHL Olivia Gans Turner attended the event and presented workshops on how abortion affects women and the world.

In the Fall of 2012, VSHL supported Virginia Governor Bob McDonnell's push to have abortion clinics fall under the same regulations as hospitals.

In January 2013, VSHL supported an pro-life rally at the Virginia State Capital that drew several hundred demonstrators. Several dozen pro-choice advocates showed up as well.

VSHL supported the amendment by Governor Robert McDonnell to forbid insurers from offering abortion coverage if they elect to be part of the federal health exchange set up by the Affordable Care Act. The Virginia General Assembly approved the amendment on April 3, 2013, after the Virginia House of Delegates approved the amendment earlier in the day.

In April 2013, VSHL advocated that the Virginia Board of Health require abortion clinics to follow the same construction standards as hospitals. The Virginia Board of Health approved regulations requiring the states abortion clinics to follow existing standards of construction for new hospitals by a vote of 11-2. "These reasonable regulations will begin to rein in reckless abortionists in Virginia" stated Olivia Gans Turner. In 2015, The Virginia Board of Health voted to remove these requirements on abortion clinics by a vote of 9–6.

== Mission statement ==
"Virginia Society for Human Life, Inc., is a voluntary and non-denominational organization united in the belief that the human being in his innate dignity and worth should be safeguarded by law at every stage of biological development. Through education and legislative activity, the Society's purpose is to promote measures which will insure protection for all innocent human life."

=== VSHL PAC ===
VSHL PAC provides support to pro-life candidates for public office, especially for U.S. Congress, the Virginia General Assembly, and statewide offices. The VSHL endorsed Fred Thompson for president in 2007. They also endorsed Gov. Bob McDonnell, Lt. Gov. Bill Bolling, and Attorney General Ken Cuccinelli in the 2009 elections, as well as 61 candidates for the Virginia House of Delegates. VSHL PAC started in 1990 and has spent about $100,000 on federal elections since then. In the 2011 state elections, 11 of VSHL's endorsed state Senate candidates and 21 endorsed House of Delegates candidates were elected.

== VSHL v. FEC ==
VSHL was involved in a federal court case against the Federal Election Commission that was decided in 2001. VSHL planned to distribute voter guides for the 2000 elections that would detail VSHL's views on life issues and would show various candidates' positions on these issues. VSHL submitted a petition to the FEC asking it to repeal a subsection of election regulations that would declare these activities corporate expenditures, illegal for a 501(c)(3) non-profit. VSHL said the law was too broad. The U.S. District Court for the Eastern District of Virginia, Richmond Division, agreed, and issued an injunction against the FEC prohibiting them from enforcing the law in question. However, the United States Court of Appeals for the Fourth Circuit overturned the lower court's nationwide injunction and amended the injunction to apply only to VSHL.

== See also ==
- National Right to Life Committee
