= Nancy Rodrigues =

American politician

16th Virginia Secretary of Administration
- In office January 11, 2014 – January 13, 2018
- Governor: Terry McAuliffe
- Preceded by: Lisa Hicks-Thomas
- Succeeded by: Keyanna Conner

Personal details
- Born: Nancy Rodrigues; December 11, 1952 (age 73) Newark, New Jersey, U.S.
- Spouse: Michael Abley
- Education: Rutgers University; College of William & Mary

Nancy Rodrigues is the deputy director of the 2019 Commemoration and former Virginia Secretary of Administration under Governor Terry McAuliffe. She was appointed to this position by Governor McAuliffe in December 2013, after nearly 30 years in public service and government.

== Early life ==
Rodrigues was born in Newark, New Jersey; she completed her undergraduate education with honors at Rutgers University and attended graduate school at the College of William & Mary. Prior to working for the Commonwealth of Virginia, she managed her own consulting firm, "Opening Doors to Government Business and Growth".

== Government work ==
Rodrigues served as the Secretary of the Virginia State Board of Elections from 2007 to 2011. During that time she helped oversee the 2008 election, which was one of the largest elections in Virginia's history. She also served as the executive director of "Drive Smart" for close to a decade, on the board of directors for the Virginia Association of Chiefs of Police Foundation, on the Virginia State Bar Unauthorized Practice of Law Committee (6 years), and on the Women's Monument Commission (which is presently working on the Virginia Women's Monument).

== Awards and personal life ==
Secretary Rodrigues has received several awards, including the Virginia Hispanic Chamber of Commerce Bridge Builder Award. She is able to speak functional Spanish and fluent Portuguese. She lives with her husband, Michael Abley, and two pets. One of her dogs, Diamond, is a rescue.

Political offices
Preceded by Lisa Hicks-Thomas	Virginia Secretary of Administration; 2014–present	Succeeded by Incumbent
