= Donald Smith (defensive back) =

American gridiron football player (born 1968)

No. 19
- Position: Cornerback

Personal information
- Born: February 21, 1968 (age 58); Danville, Virginia, U.S.

Career information
- High school: George Washington (Danville)
- College: Liberty
- NFL draft: 1990: 10th round, 271st overall pick

Career history
- 1990: Minnesota Vikings*
- 1991: Dallas Cowboys
- 1992–1994: Winnipeg Blue Bombers
- 1995: Memphis Mad Dogs
- 1996–1999: Toronto Argonauts
- 2000: Hamilton Tiger-Cats
- * Offseason or practice squad member only

Awards and highlights
- 2× Grey Cup champion (1996, 1997); 3× CFL East All-Star (1993, 1994, 1998)
- Stats at Pro Football Reference

Donald Smith (born February 21, 1968) is an American former gridiron football cornerback in the Canadian Football League (CFL) for the Winnipeg Blue Bombers, Memphis Mad Dogs and Toronto Argonauts and Hamilton Tiger-Cats from 1992 to 2000. He also played in the National Football League (NFL) for the Dallas Cowboys. He played college football at Liberty University.

== Early life ==
Smith attended George Washington High School, where he lettered in football, basketball, and track. He accepted a football scholarship from Liberty University, where he played cornerback and was coached by Sam Rutigliano. As a junior, he registered 5 interceptions. As a senior, he made 3 interceptions. He finished his college career with 26 passes deflected.

== Professional career ==
Smith was selected by the Minnesota Vikings in the tenth round (271st overall) of the 1990 NFL draft. He was waived on September 3.

In 1991, he was signed by the Dallas Cowboys. He played in three games before being released on October 17. On December 6, he was signed to the practice squad.

In 1992, he was signed by the Winnipeg Blue Bombers of the Canadian Football League (CFL), helping the team reach the Grey Cup finals, while posting 67 defensive tackles, 24 special teams tackles, 3 interceptions and a 71-yard punt return for a touchdown. The next year the team also reached the Grey Cup finals. He was named an East Division All-Star at cornerback in 1993 and 1994.

In 1995, he signed with the Memphis Mad Dogs of the CFL and was named a South Division All-Star, after registering 50 tackles, 5 interceptions, 12 passes defended and 2 fumble recoveries.

In 1996, he was signed by the CFL's Toronto Argonauts. During his time with the team, he was a part of two Grey Cup Championships (1996 and 1997). He was named an East Division All-Star at cornerback in 1998.

== Personal life ==
From 2001 to 2002, he was an assistant football coach at Liberty University. He is a special education teacher at O.T. Bonner Middle School and a football and wrestling coach at George Washington High School.
