= Joseph L. Fisher =

American politician (1914–1992)

Joe Fisher
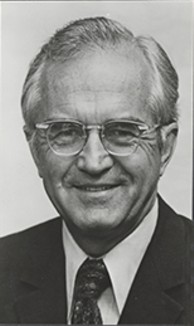

3rd Virginia Secretary of Human Resources
- In office January 16, 1982 – January 18, 1986
- Governor: Chuck Robb
- Preceded by: Jean L. Harris
- Succeeded by: Eva S. Hardy

Member of the U.S. House of Representatives from Virginia's 10th district
- In office January 3, 1975 – January 3, 1981
- Preceded by: Joel Broyhill
- Succeeded by: Frank Wolf

Personal details
- Born: January 11, 1914 Pawtucket, Rhode Island, US
- Died: February 19, 1992 (aged 78) Arlington, Virginia, US
- Party: Democratic
- Education: Bowdoin College; London School of Economics; Harvard University; George Washington University
- Joseph L. Fisher's voice Fisher speaks on the first anniversary of C-SPAN's coverage of the House of Representatives; Recorded March 19, 1980

Joseph Lyman (Joe) Fisher (January 11, 1914 – February 19, 1992) was a member of the United States House of Representatives from Virginia from 1975 to 1981 and a founder of Resources for the Future. A Democrat and lifelong Unitarian, Fisher was an active volunteer lay leader in the Unitarian Universalist Association, serving on the UUA's board of trustees and as moderator (the highest volunteer position in the UUA) from 1964 until 1977.

Fisher was the last Democrat to represent his district until 2019, when Jennifer Wexton was inaugurated.

== Private life ==
Fisher was born in Pawtucket, Rhode Island. He attended Bowdoin College in Brunswick, Maine, and graduated in 1935 with an economic degree. He met Margaret "Peggy" Winslow on a blind date, in her home town of Indianapolis, on January 1, 1941. She was a sophomore at Wellesley College while he had begun graduate studies in economics at Harvard University. In April, Fisher proposed and a little more than a year later, on June 27, 1942, they were married. They had 3 daughters and 4 sons.

== Professional career ==
After several years working at an accounting firm, Fisher was hired by the National Resource Planning Board in 1939. He was promoted to become an economist for the U.S. Department of State in 1942. He was drafted into the U.S. Army in 1943 to serve in World War II. Fisher returned to the United States after the war ended and earned a Ph.D. from Harvard University. He was then hired by the Council of Economic Advisors and, after furthering his education at George Washington University, became the senior economist at this organization in 1951. In 1953, Fisher joined the efforts of a non-profit think tank known as Resources for the Future, Inc.

In 1974, Fisher was elected to Congress from Virginia's 10th congressional district in what was considered an upset, defeating long-serving incumbent Joel Broyhill. The district was based in the Washington D.C. suburbs and had been one of the first areas in Virginia to turn Republican. Fisher served for three terms until losing to Republican Frank Wolf in November 1980. He went on to establish the Economic Policy Department at The Wilderness Society, a U.S. non-governmental organization, bringing a first-of-its-kind professional scientific focus to the wildland conservation community. Afterward, Fisher was appointed Virginia Secretary of Human Resources in 1982 and then became an economics professor at George Mason University in 1986.

In addition to Fisher's role in the policy and public world, he was deeply involved in the community. Fisher served as chairman on the Arlington County Board, the Washington Metropolitan Transit Area (WMATA), president and chairman of the Washington Metropolitan Council of Governments, and moderator for the Board of Unitarian Universalist Association.

Fisher also wrote two books, World Prospects for Natural Resources (1964) and Resources for America's Future (1963).

== Death ==
In 1985 Fisher had back pain which was diagnosed as bone cancer and went into remission after treatments, but the cancer returned in early 1991. He died on February 19, 1992, in Arlington, Virginia, and his ashes where buried at Arlington National Cemetery beside two 2-star generals.

== Archival Resources ==
Fisher donated a collection of his records to the Special Collections Research Center at George Mason University. The collection is open and accessible to the public.

== Electoral history ==
1974 Virginia's 10th congressional district election
Party	Candidate	Votes	%
Democratic	Joseph L. Fisher	67,184	53.62
Republican	Joel T. Broyhill (Incumbent)	56,649	45.21
Independent	Francis J. Speh	1,465	1.17
Write-in		6	<0.01
Total votes		125,304	100.00
Democratic gain from Republican			

1976 Virginia's 10th congressional district election
Party	Candidate	Votes	%
Democratic	Joseph L. Fisher (Incumbent)	103,689	54.72
Republican	Vincent F. Callahan Jr.	73,616	38.85
Independent	E. Stanley Rittenhouse	12,124	6.40
Write-in		60	0.03
Total votes		189,489	100.00
Democratic hold			

1978 Virginia's 10th congressional district election
Party	Candidate	Votes	%
Democratic	Joseph L. Fisher (Incumbent)	70,892	53.35
Republican	Frank Wolf	61,981	46.64
Write-in		9	0.01
Total votes		132,882	100.00
Democratic hold			

1980 Virginia's 10th congressional district election
Party	Candidate	Votes	%
Republican	Frank Wolf	110,840	51.14
Democratic	Joseph L. Fisher (Incumbent)	105,883	48.85
Write-in		21	0.01
Total votes		216,744	100.00
Republican gain from Democratic			

U.S. House of Representatives
Preceded by Joel T. Broyhill	Member of the U.S. House of Representatives from Virginia's 10th congressional district January 3, 1975 – January 3, 1981	Succeeded by Frank R. Wolf
