= Keyanna Conner =

American politician

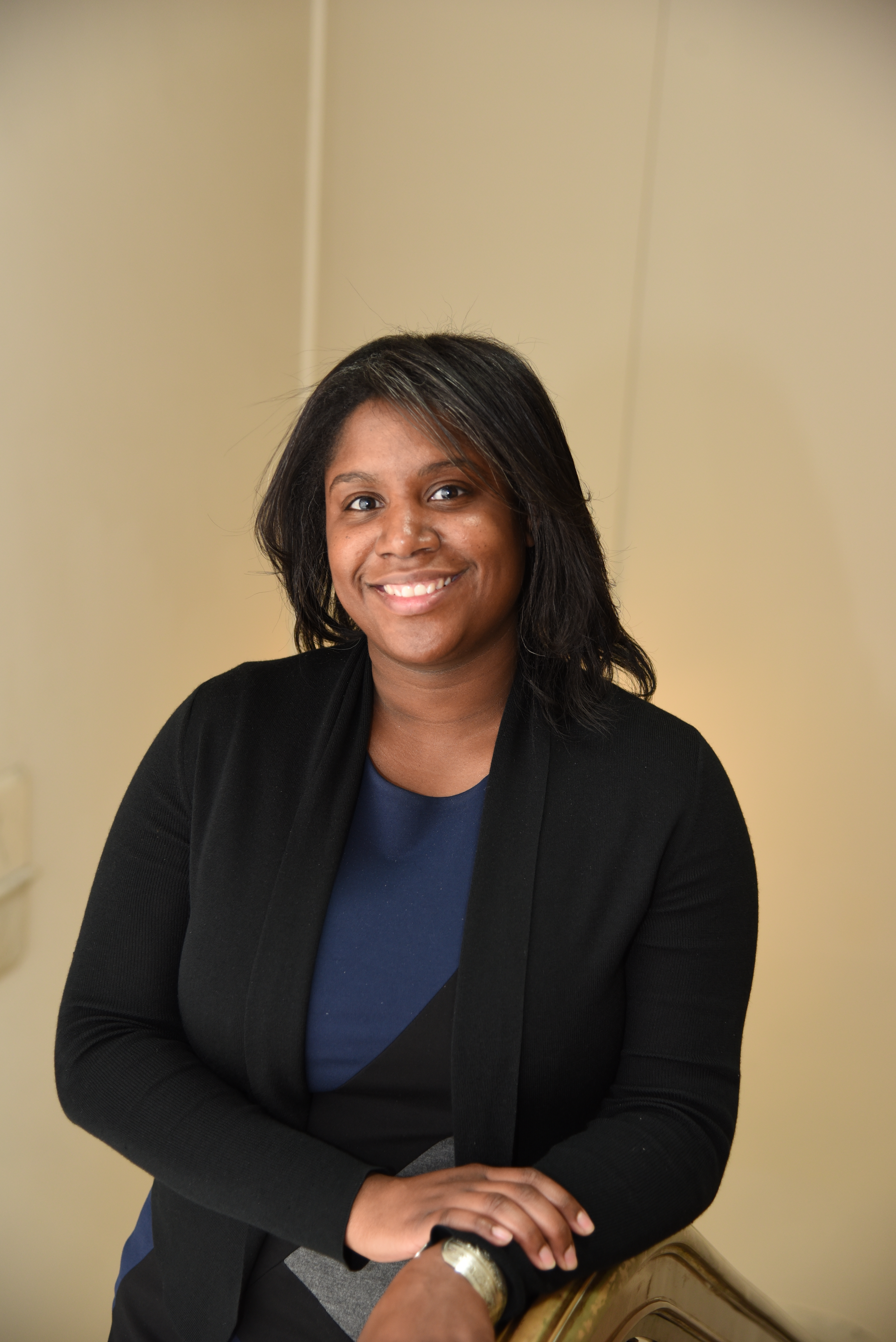

17th Virginia Secretary of Administration
- In office January 13, 2018 – January 8, 2021
- Governor: Ralph Northam
- Preceded by: Nancy Rodrigues
- Succeeded by: Grindly Johnson

Personal details
- Party: Democratic
- Education: Hampton University; Virginia Commonwealth University

Keyanna Conner is an American politician. She served as the Virginia Secretary of Administration in the Cabinet of Governor Ralph Northam. She worked for Mark Warner's campaign and administration before joining Northam's cabinet.

== Education ==
Keyanna Conner grew up on the Eastern Shore of Virginia and is a native of Wattsville, Virginia. Conner studied chemistry at Hampton University, where she took part in an environmental health project at Dar es Salaam, Tanzania where she put her skills in analytical chemistry to work. Conner graduated from Hampton University in 2006 and received a doctorate in organic chemistry from Virginia Commonwealth University in 2015, where she worked on her thesis "Gas Phase Studies of Organic Reaction Mechanisms" under adviser Scott Gronert. During her educational pursuits, Conner was actively involved in public service projects.

== Career ==
After watching Barack Obama's presidential campaign kickoff speech, Conner was inspired to be politically active and volunteered making phone calls and data entry for the Obama campaign.

After earning her undergraduate degree in 2006, she moved to Richmond, where, in 2012, she served as the Chair of the Democratic Committee in Henrico County. Conner joined Senator Mark Warner's 2014 campaign for the U.S. Senate as a senior adviser and political director. She then worked for Senator Warner, first as his Director of Government and Community Affairs and then as his State Director.

After serving on Senator Warner's staff, Conner accepted a position in Virginia Governor Ralph Northam's cabinet as Secretary of Administration. In this role, she oversaw the Department of Human Resource Management, the Department of Elections, the Compensation Board, the Virginia Information Technologies Agency, and the Department of General Services. In December 2020, it was announced that Conner would leave her position for a job in the private sector.

== Honors ==
In 2018, Conner received one of "VCU Alumni's 10 Under 10" awards.
