= Sandra Bowen =

American civil servant

13th Virginia Secretary of Administration
- In office January 14, 2002 – January 14, 2006
- Governor: Mark Warner
- Preceded by: Donald L. Moseley
- Succeeded by: Viola Baskerville

Secretary of the Commonwealth of Virginia
- In office 1986–1990
- Governor: Gerald Baliles
- Preceded by: H. Benson Dendy III
- Succeeded by: Pamela M. Womack

Personal details
- Born: Sandra Lee Dixon; April 13, 1941 (age 83); Halifax, Virginia, U.S.
- Spouse: Elmo Bowen Jr.
- Education: College of William & Mary; University of Richmond

Sandra Dixon Bowen (born April 13, 1941) is an American civil servant who was appointed by Virginia Governor Mark Warner to be his Secretary of Administration, a position she held from 2002 to 2006.

== Life ==
She graduated from the College of William & Mary, and University of Richmond.

She also served as Secretary of the Commonwealth of Virginia under Governor Gerald Baliles.

Political offices
Preceded by H. Benson Dendy III	Secretary of the Commonwealth of Virginia; 1986–1990	Succeeded by Pamela M. Womack
Preceded by Donald L. Moseley	Virginia Secretary of Administration; 2002–2006	Succeeded by Viola Baskerville
