= Lisa Hicks-Thomas =

American politician

15th Virginia Secretary of Administration
- In office January 16, 2010 – January 11, 2014
- Governor: Bob McDonnell
- Preceded by: Viola Baskerville
- Succeeded by: Nancy Rodrigues

Personal details
- Born: Lisa Michelle Hicks; March 2, 1969 (age 57) Norfolk, Virginia, U.S.
- Spouse: Samuel Sherrod Thomas
- Education: University of Virginia; College of William & Mary

Lisa Michelle Hicks-Thomas (born March 2, 1969) is a former Secretary of Administration of the Commonwealth of Virginia, serving under Governor Bob McDonnell. She was formerly a state deputy attorney general from 2007 to 2010 and assistant commonwealth's attorney in her native Chesapeake.

Political offices
Preceded by Viola Baskerville	Virginia Secretary of Administration; 2010–2014	Succeeded by Nancy Rodrigues
