= Ruby Grant Martin =

American government official

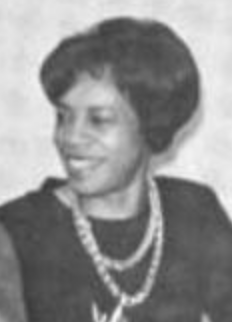
- Ruby Grant Martin, from a 1968 publication of the US federal government
- Born: Ruby Lee Grant; February 18, 1933; Gaines Landing, Chicot County, Arkansas
- Died: May 8, 2003 (aged 70); Richmond, Virginia
- Occupations: Lawyer, federal civil rights official

Ruby Lee Grant Martin (February 18, 1933 – May 8, 2003) was an American lawyer and government official. She was director of the federal Office for Civil Rights, appointed by Lyndon B. Johnson. She won the Federal Woman's Award in 1968 for her work on school desegregation.

== Early life and education ==
Ruby Lee Grant was born in Gaines Landing, Arkansas and raised in Cleveland, Ohio, the daughter of Ben F. Grant. She graduated from Glenville High School in 1952 and from Fisk University in 1956, and finished at the top of her class at Howard University School of Law in 1959.

== Career ==
Martin was a civil rights lawyer in Cleveland. She was appointed director of the Operations Division in the federal Office for Civil Rights (OCR) in 1967, and in 1968 became director of the OCR itself, during the presidency of Lyndon B. Johnson. She won the Federal Woman's Award in 1968, "for her courageous and effective administration of the civil rights compliance program and her exceptional contribution to racial justice in the field of education". At age 34, she was the youngest recipient of that award to date.

Martin co-founded and directed the Washington Research Project Action Council (now the Children's Defense Fund) in 1969, with Marian Wright Edelman, and the two women testified at a House hearing on the Emergency School Aid Act in 1971, and at a Senate hearing on equal educational opportunities in 1972. Later in the 1970s, she was general counsel to the House Committee on the District of Columbia.

Martin moved to Richmond, Virginia in 1978, and ran unsuccessfully for the city council in 1986. In 1990 She joined the cabinet of her law school classmate, Virginia governor Douglas Wilder, as Secretary of Administration. She served on state trade missions to Africa for Wilder and for North Carolina governor James B. Hunt. She was chair of the Port of Richmond project, and a member of the State Council for Higher Education in Virginia. She was secretary of Women Executives in State Government.

Martin served on the national board of Girl Scouts of USA, and supported efforts to create a National Slavery Museum in the United States. She was a member of Alpha Kappa Alpha.

== Personal life ==
Ruby Grant married a dentist, Henry S. Martin. They had three children. Martin died in 2003, aged 70 years, in Richmond. The Virginia legislature passed a joint resolution of mourning and esteem for her, in February 2004.
