= Jean L. Harris =

American physician and politician

Jean Harris

8th Mayor of Eden Prairie, Minnesota
- In office January 1995 – December 14, 2001
- Preceded by: Doug Tenpas
- Succeeded by: Nancy Tyra-Lukens

2nd Virginia Secretary of Human Resources
- In office January 14, 1978 – January 16, 1982
- Governor: John N. Dalton
- Preceded by: Otis L. Brown
- Succeeded by: Joe Fisher

Personal details
- Born: Jean Louise Harris; November 24, 1931 Richmond, Virginia, U.S.
- Died: December 14, 2001 (aged 70) Minneapolis, Minnesota, U.S.
- Party: Republican
- Spouse: Leslie John Ellis Jr.
- Education: Virginia Union University; Medical College of Virginia

Jean Louise Harris (November 24, 1931 – December 14, 2001) was an American physician and politician. The first black woman to graduate from the Medical College of Virginia, she went on to serve on the faculty there before being appointed Virginia Secretary of Human Resources by Governor John N. Dalton. Harris moved to Minnesota, where she ran in the Republican primary for lieutenant governor in 1990 and eventually for mayor of Eden Prairie. She was mayor until her death from lung cancer in 2001.

== Early life ==
Jean Harris was the daughter of Mrs. Jean L. Pace-Harris and Dr. Vernon Harris Sr. (April 30, 1897 - June 18, 1965), a prominent Meharry Medical College graduate and African-American physician in Richmond, Virginia. An Episcopalian, Harris was the oldest of her mother's two children; Dr. Harris's younger sister, Dr. Diane Harris Marsh (1936-2020), was a well-known dentist and the wife of Henry L. Marsh, famed Civil Rights attorney, long-time Virginia state senator, and Richmond's first African-American mayor. Dr. Harris's older brother, Vernon Harris Jr (May 18, 1926), was born from Vernon Sr.'s marriage to Beatrice Virginia Robinson Harris (1908–1928), who died at the age of 20 years.

An accomplished pianist, Harris competed in numerous classical piano competitions through the United States.

Harris attended Armstrong High School, graduating in 1947. Douglas Wilder, the first African-American governor in the Virginia and the United States, was Dr. Harris' neighbor and classmate at Armstrong High School and Virginia Union University.

Harris graduated with honors from Virginia Union University in 1951.

== First African-American admitted to medical school in Virginia ==
Harris was the first African-American to be admitted to a medical school in Virginia, notably the Medical College of Virginia (now Virginia Commonwealth University. Harris noted that, prior to medical school, she “had never been in the presence of more than a few whites at a time, and never in such isolation.” At the same time, she said her classmates “did not know what to expect of me either. The only blacks they had seen had been principally in their kitchens...I worked on both the white wards and the black wards. I delivered white babies and black babies…it was a good experience for MCV as well as for me, and it certainly was a good experience for those white patients who would otherwise never have seen a black physician.”

One of her medical school classmates was Hunter McGuire Jr., a member of the Virginia's well-known multigenerational McGuire medical family, great-grandson of Civil War physician Hunter Holmes McGuire, Dr. McGuire noted:

“I was not prepared for Jean. I was raised in a Confederate cradle, and until then my school and college classes had been all-male, all-white and mostly private school graduates. I wasn’t a snob or active segregationist. I was just naive.”

A member of the Class of 1955, Harris graduated in the top five of her class. Ebony Magazine featured Dr. Harris on its July 1955 magazine cover.

== Medical, academic career ==
Harris spent three years as an intern and resident at MCV before completing her post-graduate training at the University of Rochester. She served on the School of Medicine faculty during the 1970s. Harris held academic positions at Howard University and Johns Hopkins University, served as executive director of the National Medical Association Foundation, and the first full-time African-American faculty member at the Virginia Commonwealth University Medical College of Virginia.

She led a medical research foundation for the St. Paul Ramsey Medical Center. She served as the director of medical affairs at the University of Minnesota Hospital and Clinic, and was a member of the Institute of Medicine of the National Academy of Sciences.

== Political career ==
Harris became the first African American cabinet member in the Commonwealth of Virginia when Governor John Dalton appointed her Secretary of Human Resources in 1978.

The National Governors’ Association recognized her work on the federal and state level by honoring her with the association’s distinguished service award in 1981.

She served as Chief of the United States Bureau of Resources Development, a consultant to the United States Department of Health, Education and Welfare, the United States Agency on International Development and to the Congress during the Johnson and Nixon administrations.. Harris served as Vice President and health lobbyist for Control Data Corporation in Minnesota. The first African-American candidate for statewide office in Minnesota, Dr. Harris ran in the Republican primary for Lieutenant Governor of Minnesota in 2000.

Harris became the first female and first African-American mayor of Eden Prairie, Minnesota, serving from 1996 to 2001. She was a member of the United States Conference of Mayors.
