= Abortion in Virginia =

Abortion in the U.S. state of Virginia is legal up to the end of the second trimester of a pregnancy. Abortion is the most protected in Virginia compared to all the former Confederate states. After Roe v. Wade was overturned in 2022, Virginia became an abortion access state for pregnant women across the Southern United States.

Before the year 1900, abortion remained largely illegal in Virginia, reflecting a widespread trend in many U.S. states during the 19th and early 20th centuries. Abortion was viewed as a criminal act and subject to state laws that prohibited it. However, by 1950, Virginia introduced a legal therapeutic exception, allowing for abortion under specific circumstances, primarily when a woman's physical or mental health was at risk. In 1950, the University of Virginia Hospital established a review board responsible for evaluating and approving abortion requests, particularly those grounded in psychiatric reasons. This resulted in a significant decrease in the number of abortions performed at the hospital.

In a landmark 1975 case, Bigelow v. Virginia, the U.S. Supreme Court delivered a ruling that declared state bans on abortion clinics advertising their services unconstitutional. This decision marked a turning point, ensuring that abortion providers in Virginia and across the country could openly communicate and provide information about their services to the public.

In 2026, Virginia voters passed a state-level constitutional amendment on reproductive rights, putting reproductive rights in the state constitution.

== History ==
In the 2023 United States elections in Virginia, Democrats retook full control of the General Assembly after campaigning on abortion rights, following Governor Glenn Youngkin's promise to institute a 15-week abortion ban in the state if the Republicans gained a majority.

=== Legislative history ===
In 1970, Virginia made significant reforms to its abortion laws, following the American Law Institute's Model Penal Code. This marked a shift in the state's approach to reproductive rights, aligning its regulations with evolving legal standards.

Throughout the following decades, Virginia introduced various regulations impacting abortion access. By 2007, the state was among those with detailed abortion-specific informed consent requirements, ensuring that individuals seeking abortion were provided specific information before the procedure.

In 2013, Virginia implemented Targeted Regulation of Abortion Providers (TRAP) laws, imposing stringent requirements not only on abortion clinics, but also on private doctor offices and medication-induced abortions. These regulations sparked debates around their impact on access to abortion services and the health-care landscape.

In mid-May 2019, Virginia passed legislation banning abortion after the 25th week of pregnancy, further influencing the timeline for legal abortion procedures in the state.

In April 2020, Governor Ralph Northam signed bills removing certain abortion-related regulations. These bills eliminated requirements such as mandatory ultrasounds and social counseling on abortion alternatives 24 hours before the procedure. They also expanded health-care professionals authorized to perform first-trimester abortions, and removed the designation of facilities performing more than five abortions annually as hospitals.

Presently, Virginia prohibits abortions in the third trimester, except when continuing the pregnancy poses an imminent danger to the woman's life, as certified by a physician. This requires the certification of three doctors if terminating the pregnancy is deemed necessary due to the likelihood of the patient's death or substantial and irremediable impairment to her mental or physical health.

On February 7, 2024, the Virginia House rejected a bill that would have instituted a near-total abortion ban. In January 2026, the Virginia General Assembly placed on the November 2026 ballot a referendum to amend the state's constitution to fully legalize abortion prior to the third trimester, which passed.

=== Judicial history ===
The US Supreme Court's decision in 1973's Roe v. Wade ruling meant the state could no longer regulate abortion in the first trimester. (However, the Supreme Court overturned Roe v. Wade in Dobbs v. Jackson Women's Health Organization, No. 19-1392, 597 U.S. ___ (2022) later in 2022.)

=== Clinic history ===
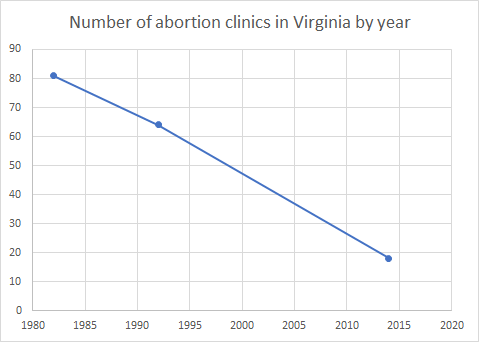
Number of abortion clinics in Virginia by year

Between 1982 and 1992, the number of abortion clinics in the state declined by seventeen, going from 81 in 1982 to 64 in 1992. In 2014, there were eighteen abortion clinics in the state. In 2014, 92% of the counties in the state did not have an abortion clinic. That year, 78% of women in the state aged 15–44 lived in a county without an abortion clinic. In 2017, there were five Planned Parenthood clinics, of which four offered abortion services, in a state with a population of 1,971,590 women aged 15–49.

In 2017, 17,210 abortions were done in Virginia. Not all of these were done for people who were residents of the state, many people had to travel from farther due to their state not providing this option.

On May 9, 2007, an unidentified person deliberately set fire to a Planned Parenthood clinic in Virginia Beach, Virginia.

== Statistics ==
In the period between 1972 and 1974, the state had an illegal abortion mortality rate per million women aged 15–44 of between 0.1 and 0.9. In 1990, 745,000 women in the state faced the risk of an unintended pregnancy. In 2010, the state had two federally funded abortions. In 2013, among white women aged 15–19, there were 1,090 abortions, 1,280 abortions for black women aged 15–19, 250 abortions for Hispanic women aged 15–19, and 190 abortions for women of all other races. In 2014, 55% of adults said in a poll by the Pew Research Center that abortion should be legal in all or most cases. The 2023 American Values Atlas reported that, in their most recent survey, 71% of Virginians said that abortion should be legal in all or most cases. In 2017, the state had an infant mortality rate of 5.9 deaths per 1,000 live births.

Number of reported abortions, abortion rate and percentage change in rate by geographic region and state in 1992, 1995 and 1996
Census division and state	Number			Rate			% change 1992–1996
Census division and state	1992	1995	1996	1992	1995	1996	% change 1992–1996
South Atlantic	269,200	261,990	263,600	25.9	24.6	24.7	–5
Delaware	5,730	5,790	4,090	35.2	34.4	24.1	–32
District of Columbia	21,320	21,090	20,790	138.4	151.7	154.5	12
Florida	84,680	87,500	94,050	30	30	32	7
Georgia	39,680	36,940	37,320	24	21.2	21.1	–12
Maryland	31,260	30,520	31,310	26.4	25.6	26.3	0
North Carolina	36,180	34,600	33,550	22.4	21	20.2	–10
South Carolina	12,190	11,020	9,940	14.2	12.9	11.6	–19
Virginia	35,020	31,480	29,940	22.7	20	18.9	–16
West Virginia	3,140	3,050	2,610	7.7	7.6	6.6	–14

Number, rate, and ratio of reported abortions, by reporting area of residence and occurrence and by percentage of abortions obtained by out-of-state residents, US CDC estimates
Location	Residence			Occurrence			% obtained by out-of-state residents	Year	Ref
Location	No.	Rate^	Ratio^^	No.	Rate^	Ratio^^	% obtained by out-of-state residents	Year	Ref
Virginia	20,444	12.1	198	20,187	12.0	195	5.9	2014	
Virginia	18,501	11	179	18,663	11.1	181	5.2	2015	
Virginia	16,913	10.1	165	17,058	10.2	166	6.0	2016	
^number of abortions per 1,000 women aged 15–44; ^^number of abortions per 1,000 live births

Reported or polled legal abortions in Virginia
Year	Total	Ratio*	Rate**	Percentage of abortion by out-of-state residents
1980	31,958	408	24	5.9%
1981	32,037	404	25	5.8%
1982	31,869	393	25	5.8%
1983	31,339	388	24	5.6%
1984	31,550	382	23	5.6%
1985	31,951	372	23	5.8%
1986	32,619	374	25	5.6%
1987	32,930	365	24	5.5%
1988	34,029	367	24	5.9%
1989	33,186	344	22	6.0%
1990	32,992	334	21	6.0%
1991	31,943	330	21	5.9%
1992	29,641	306	19	6.0%
1993	28,285	301	18	5.9%
1994	26,369	279	17	6.3%
1995	25,302	277	15	5.7%
1996	25,770	279	16	5.8%
1997	27,260	297	17	5.7%
1998	26,115	277	16	5.8%
1999	28,388	297	18	6.3%
2000	28,627	289	18	6.2%
2001	24,586	249	15	6.1%
2002	24,992	251	16	5.7%
2003	26,437	261	17	4.8%
2004	26,117	251	16	5.1%
2005	26,309	252	16	4.7%
2006	27,349	254	16	5.3%
2007	27,981	257	17	5.5%
2008	28,698	269	17	6.2%
2009	27,442	261	16	7.0%
2010	25,953	252	15	7.1%
2011	25,413	248	15	7.0%
2012	22,916	222	13	6.6%
2013	20,852	204	12	5.6%
2014	20,187	195	12	5.9%
2015	18,663	181	11	5.2%
2016	17,058	166	10	6.0%

== Abortion rights views and activities ==
=== Protests ===
Women from the state participated in marches supporting abortion rights as part of a #StoptheBans movement in May 2019. A meme surfaced in 2019 with roughly over 70,766 shares. Practically misrepresenting Virginia Governor Ralph Northam “aiming to ease restrictions for third-trimester abortions in the state”. Northam was referring to Bill HB 2491, introduced by Kathy Tran proposing changes in the restriction for third trimester abortions. Stop the Bans were rallies circling the “concerns of women’s rights, [asserted] that politicians should not be making medical decisions about women’s bodies”. Governor Northam faced backlash over such comments from the Pro-life community. Northam's committee was quick to the press and stated the comments were taken out of context and Governor does support abortions in order to save the pregnant individual's life.

Following the overturn of Roe v. Wade on June 24, 2022, hundreds of abortion rights protesters rallied at Lafayette Park in Norfolk, and in Richmond hundreds of abortion rights protesters marched from the Federal Court building to City Hall.

In Richmond, Virginia on March 29, 2023, two people were arrested after a physical fight broke out between anti-abortion protesters and abortion rights protesters at Virginia Commonwealth University.

== Anti-abortion views and activities ==
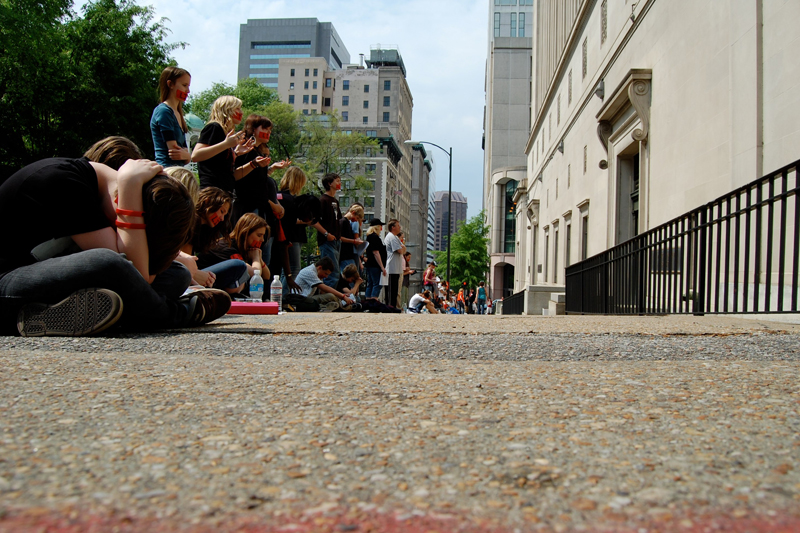
"Silent Siege" where youth prayed silently for the ending of abortion. April 26, 2008, in Richmond, Virginia.

=== Organizations ===
Virginia Society for Human Life (VSHL), a nonprofit organization advocating an end to abortion in Virginia and is the oldest anti-abortion organization in the US.

=== Violence ===
An anti-abortion protester named Joseph Grace set the Hillcrest clinic in Norfolk, Virginia ablaze on May 26, 1983. He was arrested while sleeping in his van a few blocks from the clinic when a patrol officer noticed the smell of kerosene.

An unidentified person deliberately set fire to a Planned Parenthood clinic in Virginia Beach, Virginia on May 9, 2007.
