= Virginia Secretary of Administration =

U.S. state government position

Secretary of Administration of the Commonwealth of Virginia
- Seal of the Commonwealth of Virginia

- Flag of Virginia
- Incumbent; Traci DeShazor since January 17, 2026
- Style: Madam Secretary
- Member of: Virginia Governor's Cabinet
- Nominator: The governor
- Appointer: The governor with advice and consent from the Senate and House
- Term length: 4 years
- Inaugural holder: T. Edward Temple
- Formation: April 8, 1972
- Website: administration.virginia.gov

The secretary of administration is a member of the Virginia Governor's Cabinet.

== Duties ==
The Secretary is responsible for overseeing Virginia's elections, state employee benefits, and information technology throughout the commonwealth's executive branch agencies.

The following agencies report to the Secretary:

- Virginia Department of Elections
- Virginia Department of General Services
- Virginia Department of Human Resource Management
- Virginia Information Technologies Agency
- The Virginia Compensation Board
- Virginia Office of Data Governance and Analytics

== List of secretaries ==
=== Administration (July 1, 1972 – July 1, 1976) ===
- T. Edward Temple (1972–1974)
- Maurice B. Rowe III (1974–1976)

=== Administration and finance (July 1, 1976 – July 1, 1984) ===
- Maurice B. Rowe III (1976–1978)
- Charles Walker (1978–1981)
- Stuart Connock (1981–1982)
- Wayne F. Anderson (1982–1984)

=== Administration (July 1, 1984 – present) ===
- Andrew B. Fogarty (1984–1985)
- David K. McCloud (1985–1986)
- Carolyn J. Moss (1986–1990)
- Ruby Grant Martin (1990–1994)
- Michael E. Thomas (1994–1998)
- G. Bryan Slater (1998–2001)
- Donald L. Moseley (2001–2002)
- Sandra Bowen (2002–2006)
- Viola Baskerville (2006–2010)
- Lisa Hicks-Thomas (2010–2014)
- Nancy Rodrigues (2014–2018)
- Keyanna Conner (2018–2020)
- Grindly Johnson (2020–2022)
- Lyn McDermid (2022-2026)
- Traci DeShazor (2026-present)
