= Virginia Department of Health =

State health agency in Virginia, US

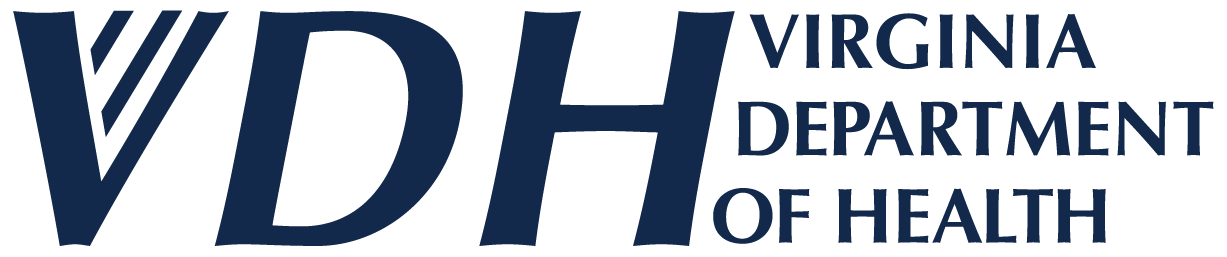

Agency overview
- Formed: 1907
- Preceding agency: Virginia State Board of Health (1872-1907)
- Superseding agency: Virginia Board of Health
- Jurisdiction: Commonwealth of Virginia
- Headquarters: Richmond, Virginia
- Employees: 3300
- Annual budget: $1.2 billion
- Agency executives: Marvin B. Figueroa, Virginia Secretary of Health and Human Resources; B. Cameron Webb, State Health Commissioner
- Website: https://www.vdh.virginia.gov

The Virginia Department of Health (VDH) is a department of the Virginia Government that oversees public health in Virginia. The department is led by the State Health Commissioner, who reports to the Secretary of Health and Human Resources. Oversight is provided by the 15-member Virginia Board of Health. Public services are divided among 32 health districts. In fiscal year 2024, its budget was approximately $1.2 billion.

== History ==
The history of public health in Virginia is extensive and ultimately has its roots in the Jamestown Colony, where a sanitation law was passed in 1610 which in part stated "nor shall anyone aforesaid, within less than a quarter of one mile from the Pallizadoes, dare to doe the necessities of nature."

Common 18th century outbreaks, such as smallpox, brought public health to the attention of legislators. A 1777 law required travelers with contagious diseases to leave the roadway when others approached. In 1780, the first board of health nationwide was established in Petersburg.

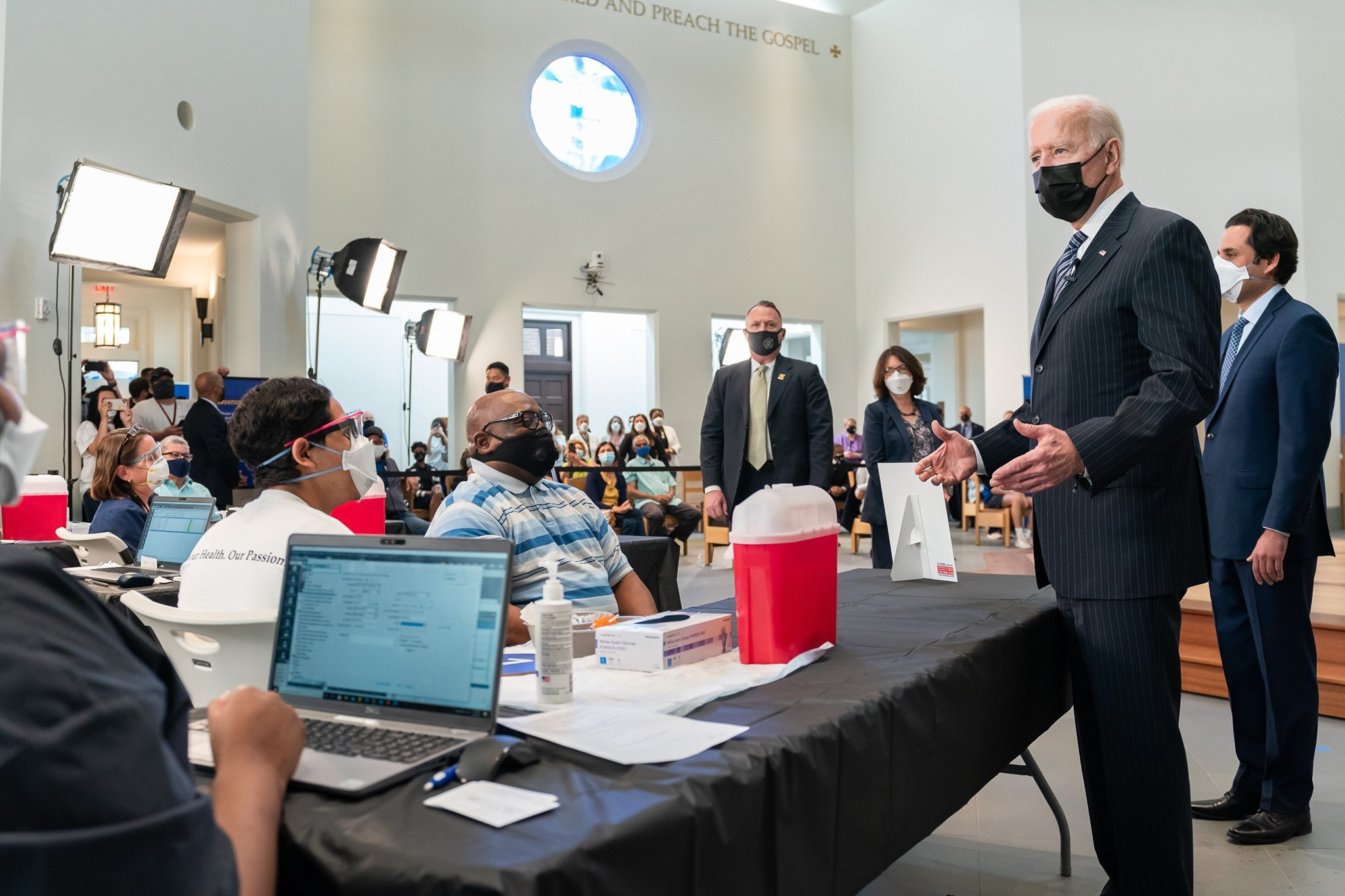
President Joe Biden visits a VDH vaccination site during the COVID-19 pandemic.

The Virginia State Board of Health was established in 1872, and was formally reorganized into the Virginia Department of Health in 1907. Since its inception, the department has served as Virginia's frontline health agency through the Spanish flu, the AIDS crisis, the H1N1 outbreak, and the COVID-19 pandemic.

== Organization ==
- Office of the State Health Commissioner
- Chief Deputy Commissioner for Community Health Services
  - 4 Regional Health Directors
    - 32 Health Districts
  - Director of Public Health Nursing
- Deputy Commissioner for Population Health and Preparedness
  - Office of the Chief Medical Examiner
  - Office of Drinking Water
  - Office of Emergency Preparedness
  - Office of Emergency Medical Services
  - Office of Radiological Health
  - Office of Environmental Health Services
  - Office of Epidemiology
  - Office of Family Health Services
  - Office of Health Equity
- Deputy Commissioner for Governmental and Regulatory Affairs
  - Office of Communication
  - Office of Licensure and Certification

== See also ==
- Virginia Board of Health
