= Virginia Department of Rail and Public Transportation =

Government agency

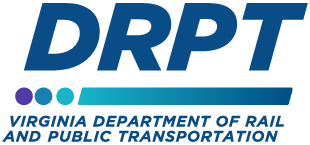

Agency overview
- Formed: July 1, 1992
- Jurisdiction: Virginia
- Agency executive: Mariia Zimmerman, Director
- Parent agency: Virginia Secretary of Transportation
- Website: www.drpt.virginia.gov

The Virginia Department of Rail and Public Transportation (VDRPT) is an agency of the Commonwealth of Virginia in the United States. The agency's mission is "to connect and improve the quality of life for all Virginians with innovative transportation solutions." The three primary areas of VDRPT activity are the state's railroads, public transportation, and commuter services.

== History ==
The agency was formerly a section within the Virginia Department of Transportation (VDOT). In 1992, the state General Assembly established DRPT as a separate department, reporting to the Virginia Secretary of Transportation and the Commonwealth Transportation Board. VDOT continued to be responsible for most highways and related facilities, such as ferry systems, bridges, and tunnels.

== Services ==
As a now-separate agency, VDRPT still works closely with VDOT, as well as with other state transportation agencies responsible for aviation and ports.

VDRPT operates the Virginia Breeze intercity bus service.

== List of directors ==
No.	Director	Took office	Left office	Governor
1	Leo J. Bevon	September 14, 1992		Douglas Wilder, George Allen, Jim Gilmore, Mark Warner
2	Karen Rae	August 19, 2002		Mark Warner
3	Corey Hill (acting)	Feb 21, 2006		Tim Kaine
4	Matthew Tucker	June 1, 2006		Tim Kaine
5	Charles M. "Chip" Badger (acting)	December 12, 2008		Tim Kaine
6	Thelma Drake	January 2010		Bob McDonnell
7	Jennifer Mitchell	January 2014		Terry McAuliffe, Ralph Northam
8	Jennifer Debruhl (acting)	March 2022		Glenn Youngkin
9	Jennifer Debruhl	July 22, 2022		Glenn Youngkin
10	Zach Trogdon (interim)	June 2024		Glenn Youngkin
11	Tiffany Robinson	November 2024		Glenn Youngkin
12	Mariia Zimmerman	January 17, 2026		Abigail Spanberger

== See also ==
- Transportation in Virginia
