= Virginia Secretary of Transportation =

Secretary of Transportation of the Commonwealth of Virginia
- Incumbent; Nick M. Donohue since January 18, 2026
- Style: Mr. Secretary
- Member of: Virginia Governor's Cabinet
- Nominator: The governor
- Appointer: The governor with advice and consent from the Senate and House
- Term length: 4 years
- Inaugural holder: Wayne A. Whitham (as Secretary of Transportation and Public Safety)
- Formation: April 8, 1972
- Website: transportation.virginia.gov

The secretary of transportation is a member of the Virginia Governor's Cabinet in the U.S. state of Virginia. Nick M. Donohue is the current secretary.

== Agencies ==
The secretary of transportation overlooks the following agencies:

- Virginia Department of Aviation
- Virginia Department of Motor Vehicles
- Virginia Department of Rail and Public Transportation
- Virginia Department of Transportation
- Virginia Motor Vehicle Dealer Board
- Virginia Office of Transportation Public-Private Partnerships
- Virginia Commercial Space Flight Authority
- Virginia Port Authority

== List of secretaries ==
=== Transportation and public safety (July 1, 1972–July 1, 1976) ===
- Wayne A. Whitham (1972–1976)

=== Transportation (July 1, 1976–July 1, 1984) ===
- Wayne A. Whitham (1976–1978)
- George M. Walters (1978–1982)
- Andrew B. Fogarty (1982–1984)

=== Transportation and public safety (July 1, 1984–February 22, 1990) ===
- Franklin E. White (1984–1985)
- Andrew B. Fogarty (1985–1986)
- Vivian E. Watts (1986–1990)

=== Transportation (February 22, 1990–present) ===
- John G. Milliken (1990–1994)
- Robert E. Martinez (1994–1998)
- Shirley Ybarra (1998–2002)
- Whittington W. Clement (2002–2005)
- Pierce Homer (2005–2010)
- Sean Connaughton (2010–2014)
- Aubrey Layne (2014–2018)
- Shannon Valentine (2018–2022)
- W. Sheppard Miller III (2022–2026)
- Nick M. Donohue (2026-present)
