= Virginia Highlands Airport =

- IATA: VJI; ICAO: KVJI; FAA LID: VJI

Summary
- Airport type: Public
- Owner: Virginia Highlands Airport Authority
- Serves: Abingdon, Virginia
- Elevation AMSL: 2,087 ft / 636 m
- Coordinates: 36°41′14″N 082°01′59″W
- Website: www.vahighlandsairport.com

Map
- Location of airport in Virginia

Runways
Direction	Length		Surface
Direction	ft	m	Surface
6/24	5,500	1,676	Asphalt

Statistics (2019)
- Aircraft operations: 15,137
- Based aircraft: 50
- Source: Federal Aviation Administration

Virginia Highlands Airport (IATA: VJI, ICAO: KVJI, FAA LID: VJI) is a public use airport located two nautical miles (4 km) west of the central business district of Abingdon, a city in Washington County, Virginia, United States. It is owned by the Virginia Highlands Airport Authority. This airport is included in the National Plan of Integrated Airport Systems for 2011–2015, which categorized it as a general aviation facility.

== History ==
In 2024, the airport further expanded to its present length of 5,500ft with an addition of a north taxiway to runway 6. Further construction is underway for new hangars.

== Facilities and aircraft ==
Virginia Highlands Airport covers an area of 184 acres (74 ha) at an elevation of 2,087 feet (636 m) above mean sea level. It has one runway designated 6/24 with an asphalt surface measuring 5,500 by 75 feet (1,676 x 23 m).

For the 12-month period ending December 31, 2019, the airport had 15,137 aircraft operations, an average of 41 per day: 90% general aviation, 9% air taxi, and 1% military. At that time there were 50 aircraft based at this airport: 35 single-engine, 7 jet, 4 multi-engine, and 4 helicopter.
