= Traci DeShazor =

American government official

Virginia Secretary of Administration
- Incumbent
- Assumed office January 17, 2026
- Governor: Abigail Spanberger
- Preceded by: Lyn McDermid

Personal details
- Born: Danville, Virginia, U.S.
- Education: Virginia Tech; Hollins University

Traci J. DeShazor is an American government official appointed to serve as the Virginia Secretary of Administration under governor Abigail Spanberger. She was previously the deputy Secretary of the Commonwealth of Virginia under governors Terry McAuliffe and Ralph Northam. In this capacity, she administered the restoration of civil and voting rights to over 300,000 Virginians and coordinated statewide racial equity listening sessions following the 2019 Virginia political crisis. DeShazor subsequently served as the deputy chief administrative officer for human services and the first chief equity officer for the city of Richmond, Virginia.

== Early life and education ==
DeShazor was born and raised in Danville, Virginia. She attended Woodberry Hills Elementary and graduated from George Washington High School. During her high school years, she worked as an election page. DeShazor is a graduate of Virginia Tech and Hollins University. She completed leadership programs at the University of Virginia, Virginia Commonwealth University, and Yale University.

== Career ==
DeShazor began her career in Virginia politics working with the Terry McAuliffe 2013 gubernatorial campaign, where she served as the African-American outreach coordinator. Following the election, she worked on the governor-elect's transition team. She subsequently served as the deputy director of the Virginia Office of Intergovernmental Affairs, a role in which she acted as a federal liaison between the Government of Virginia, the White House, the Virginia congressional delegation, and other states. On June 24, 2016, governor Terry McAuliffe appointed DeShazor as the deputy secretary of the Commonwealth of Virginia.

In December 2017, governor Ralph Northam reappointed DeShazor as deputy secretary of the Commonwealth. In this capacity, she supervised eight divisions responsible for core administrative and constitutional functions serving more than 2,000 Virginians weekly. Her work included playing a role in efforts to restore civil and voting rights to over 300,000 Virginians and supporting thousands of pardons.

Following the 2019 blackface scandal involving Governor Northam, DeShazor led the governor's community liaison office. DeShazor and press secretary Alena Yarmosky worked closely to facilitate a series of listening sessions across the state to address racial equity. Activist Wes Bellamy credited DeShazor with "saving the state" during this period by ensuring that the administration's commitment to equity work resulted in substantive action.

DeShazor transitioned to local government in the Richmond, Virginia, where she served as the deputy chief administrative officer for human services until March 2025. In this role, she oversaw a portfolio of six agencies and more than 1,000 employees. During her tenure, she helped launch the department of Neighborhood and Community Services and established new offices focused on homelessness and neighborhood support. She also served as Richmond's first chief equity officer, working to modernize the city's language access policies.

In December 2025, governor-elect Abigail Spanberger announced the selection of DeShazor as the next Virginia Secretary of Administration.

== Personal life ==
As of 2025, DeShazor resides in Richmond, Virginia, with her husband. She is a member of the Alpha Kappa Alpha, specifically the Alpha Phi Omega chapter. She serves on the board of directors for the Virginia Tech Foundation and on the Virginia Tech Alumni Association Board.
