= Virginia Department for Aging and Rehabilitative Services =

State government agency in Virginia

Agency overview
- Formed: 2012; 14 years ago
- Type: Department
- Jurisdiction: Virginia
- Headquarters: Henrico, Virginia
- Annual budget: $236m USD (2022)

The Virginia Department for Aging and Rehabilitative Services is the executive branch agency of the state government responsible for vocational rehabilitation, supportive services, and aging/disability services in the state of Virginia in the United States.

== Background ==
Established by the Virginia General Assembly in 2012, the agency is headquartered in Henrico, Virginia and is overseen by the Virginia Secretary of Health and Human Resources, with day-to-day operations led by an agency commissioner appointed by the Governor of Virginia. The mission of the agency is "to improve the employment, quality of life, security, and independence of older Virginians, Virginians with disabilities, and their families."

Departments and divisions within the agency include the Adult Protective Services Division, Community Based Services Division, Disability Determination Services, Division for Rehabilitative Services, Division for Community Living, Office for Aging Services, Wilson Workforce and Rehabilitation Center, Office of Community Integration, Office of Disability Programs, and Office of the State of Virginia Long-Term Care Ombudsman.

The agency is currently led by Kathryn A. Hayfield, who has served as Commissioner since 2018.
