= Prince William Board of County Supervisors =

Virginia, US county government

Type
- Type: Board of Supervisors

Leadership
- Chair: Deshundra Jefferson (D)
- Vice Chair: Victor Angry (D-Neabsco)
- Chair Pro-tem: Tom Gordy (R-Brentsville)

Structure
- Seats: 8
- Political groups: Democratic Party (5); Republican Party (3)
- Length of term: 4 years

Elections
- Next election: November 2, 2027

Website
- Prince William County Board

The Prince William Board of County Supervisors is the policy-making body for the government of Prince William County, Virginia. The county is divided into seven magisterial districts: Brentsville, Coles, Gainesville, Neabsco, Occoquan, Potomac, and Woodbridge. The magisterial districts each elect one supervisor to the Board of Supervisors. There is also a Chairman elected by the county at-large, bringing total Board membership to 8. A Vice-Chairman and a Chairman Pro-Tem are selected by the Board from amongst its membership. The current Chairman is Democrat Deshundra Jefferson.

== Membership ==
The board is currently controlled by Democrats, who have five out of the eight seats, and currently control both the Chairmanship and Vice Chairmanship. The current districts and their Supervisors are:

Board of County Supervisors
| Position | Name | Party | First Election | District |
|---|---|---|---|---|
| Chairman | Deshundra Jefferson | Democratic | 2023 | At-Large |
| Supervisor | Tom Gordy | Republican | 2023 | Brentsville |
| Supervisor | Yesli Vega | Republican | 2019 | Coles |
| Supervisor | George Stewart | Democratic | 2025 (special) | Gainesville |
| Supervisor | Victor Angry | Democratic | 2019 (special) | Neabsco |
| Supervisor | Kenny Boddye | Democratic | 2019 | Occoquan |
| Supervisor | Andrea Bailey | Democratic | 2019 | Potomac |
| Supervisor | Jeannie LaCroix | Republican | 2026 (special) | Woodbridge |

Prince William Board of County Supervisors by partisanship
All 7 districts 5 (Note: This includes the 1 county-wide elected member.) seats needed for a majority
| | Majority party | Minority party |
|---|---|---|
| Party | Democratic | Republican |
| Seats | 5 | 3 |
- As of 2026; Democratic Republican
