= Virginia Department of Social Services =

State agency of Virginia

Agency overview
- Formed: 1982; 44 years ago
- Jurisdiction: Government of Virginia
- Headquarters: 5600 Cox Road, Glen Allen, Virginia
- Agency executive: James Williams, Commissioner
- Website: Official website

The Virginia Department of Social Services (VDSS) is a state supervised and locally administered social services system in the Commonwealth of Virginia. The department is headed by a Commissioner who is appointed by the Governor of Virginia. VDSS provides oversight and guidance to over 120 local offices across the state of Virginia, and administers various programs, including Temporary Assistance for Needy Families (TANF), Supplemental Nutrition Assistance Program (SNAP), Medicaid, Adoption, Foster Care, Child Care Assistance, Refugee Resettlement Services, and Child and Adult Protective Services.

VDSS was established in 1982 when the Virginia General Assembly renamed the Department of Welfare to the Department of Social Services. The Department of Welfare was an active agency of the Department of Institutions from 1974 until 1982.
