= Virginia Department of Transportation =

State government agency in Virginia

Virginia Department of Transportation (VDOT)

Agency overview
- Formed: 1906; 120 years ago
- Preceding agencies: Virginia Department of Highways (VDH) (1927-1974); Virginia Department of Highways and Transportation (VDHT) (1974-1986)
- Type: Department
- Jurisdiction: Commonwealth of Virginia
- Headquarters: 1401 E. Broad Street, Richmond, Virginia, 23219; 37°32′16″N 77°25′48″W
- Motto: We Keep Virginia Moving
- Employees: 7500
- Annual budget: $7.5 b USD (FY2022)
- Agency executives: Stephen C. Brich, P.E., Commissioner; Cathy McGhee, P.E., Chief Deputy Commissioner; Lisa M. Pride, Chief of Administration; Barton A. Thrasher, P.E., Chief Engineer; Laura Farmer, Chief Financial Officer; Angel Deem, Chief of Policy; Kevin Gregg, Chief of Maintenance and Operations
- Parent department: Virginia Secretary of Transportation
- Parent agency: Commonwealth Transportation Board
- Website: virginiadot.org

The Virginia Department of Transportation (VDOT) is the agency of the state government responsible for transportation in the state of Virginia in the United States. The Virginia Department of Transportation is headquartered at the Virginia Department of Highways Building in Downtown Richmond. VDOT is responsible for building, maintaining, and operating the roads, bridges, and tunnels in the commonwealth. It is overseen by the Commonwealth Transportation Board, which has the power to fund airports, seaports, rail, and public transportation.

The Virginia Department of Transportation's revised annual budget for fiscal year 2019 is $5.4 billion.

The Virginia Department of Transportation has a workforce of about 7,500 full-time employees.

== Responsibilities ==
Virginia has the nation's third largest system of state-maintained highways, after North Carolina and Texas. The Virginia highway system totals approximately 58,000 miles of interstate, primary, frontage, and secondary roads. The system includes about 20,000 bridges and structures. In addition, independent cities and towns, as well as the counties of Henrico and Arlington, maintain approximately 12,000 miles of local streets, and receive funds from the state for that purpose.

The Virginia Department of Transportation operates and maintains:

- Roads: The Virginia Department of Transportation's largest responsibility is the maintenance of roads. Filling potholes, storm drain cleaning, water drainage, guard rail replacement, bridge work, tree removal, and trash removal, as well as the maintenance of signs and traffic lights.
- More than 21,000 bridges and structures
- Snow removal: VDOT is responsible for removing snow along the major roads of Virginia.
- Forty-one safety rest areas and ten welcome centers along major highways
- More than 100 commuter parking lots
- Four underwater crossings in the Hampton Roads area:
  - The mid-town Elizabeth River tunnel (Note: Elizabeth River Crossings operates these facilities)
  - The downtown Elizabeth River tunnel
  - The Hampton Roads Bridge-Tunnel on I-64
  - The Monitor-Merrimac Memorial Bridge-Tunnel on I-664
- Two mountain tunnels on I-77 in Southwest Virginia:
  - East River Mountain Tunnel
  - Big Walker Mountain Tunnel
- Two toll roads:
  - Fairfax County's Dulles Toll Road (operated and maintained by MWAA)
  - The Powhite Parkway Extension near Richmond
- One toll bridge: The George P. Coleman Memorial Bridge
- Three ferry services:
  - Jamestown Ferry
  - Sunny Bank
  - Merry Point

== Budget ==
Highway maintenance and operations represent 41% of the total budget, followed by 32% for highway systems construction. Smaller portions of the budget are directed to address the needs and requirements of debt service, support to other agencies, administration, and earmarks and special financing.

=== Sources ===
(in millions)

Fiscal Year	Motor Fuels Tax	Vehicle Sales and Use Tax	Vehicle License Tax	Retail Sales and Use Tax	Special General Funds	Toll revenue and Other Sources	Federal	Total
2010	$793	$363	$235	$376		$766	$844	$3,378
2009	$809	$398	$235	$405		$687	$915	$3,448
2008	$843	$561	$216	$422	$325	$738	$910	$4,014

=== Expenditures ===
(in millions)

Fiscal Year	Debt Service	Other Agencies & Transfers	Maintenance & Operations	Tolls, Administration, & Other Programs	Public Transportation & Rail	Earmarks & Special Financing	Highway Systems Construction
2010	$257	$45	$1,631	$396	$19	$362	$669
2009	$260	$45	$1,525	$441	$20	$258	$899
2008	$263	$51	$1,583	$471	$15	$583	$1,048

== Districts ==
Virginia is divided into nine districts:

- Bristol District
  - Counties: Bland, Buchanan, Dickenson, Grayson, Lee, Russell, Scott, Smyth, Tazewell, Washington, Wise and Wythe
  - Cities: Bristol, Norton
- Salem District
  - Counties: Bedford, Botetourt, Carroll, Craig, Floyd, Franklin, Giles, Henry, Montgomery, Patrick, Pulaski and Roanoke
  - Cities: Galax, Martinsville, Radford, Roanoke and Salem
- Lynchburg District
  - Counties: Amherst, Appomattox, Buckingham, Campbell, Charlotte, Cumberland, Halifax, Nelson, Pittsylvania and Prince Edward
  - Cities: Danville and Lynchburg
- Richmond District
  - Counties: Amelia, Brunswick, Charles City, Chesterfield, Dinwiddie, Goochland, Hanover, Henrico, (Note: Henrico county maintains its own county roads) Lunenburg, Mecklenburg, New Kent, Nottoway, Powhatan, and Prince George
  - Cities: Colonial Heights, Hopewell, Petersburg, and Richmond
- Hampton Roads District (Note: Cities in the Hampton Roads district maintain their own roads, but VDOT has jurisdiction for interstates and tunnels.)
  - Counties: Accomack, Isle of Wight, (Note: The town of Smithfield maintains its own roads) James City, Northampton, Southampton, Surry, Sussex, York, and Greensville
  - Cities: Chesapeake, Emporia, Franklin, Hampton, Newport News, Norfolk, Poquoson, Portsmouth, Suffolk, Virginia Beach, and Williamsburg
- Fredericksburg District
  - Counties: Caroline, Essex, Gloucester, King and Queen, King George, King William, Lancaster, Mathews, Middlesex, Northumberland, Richmond, Spotsylvania, Stafford, and Westmoreland
  - Cities: Fredericksburg
- Culpeper District
  - Counties: Albemarle, Culpeper, Fauquier, Fluvanna, Greene, Louisa, Madison, Orange, and Rappahannock
  - Cities: Charlottesville
- Staunton District
  - Counties: Alleghany, Augusta, Bath, Clarke, Frederick, Highland, Page, Rockbridge, Rockingham, Shenandoah, and Warren
  - Cities: Buena Vista, Covington, Harrisonburg, Lexington, Staunton, Waynesboro, and Winchester
- Northern Virginia District
  - Counties: Arlington, (Note: Arlington county maintains its own county roads) Fairfax, Loudoun, and Prince William
  - Cities: Alexandria, Fairfax, Falls Church, Manassas, and Manassas Park

== 511 ==
Many US states, as well as several US local governments and Canadian provinces, provide 511 systems. The Virginia Department of Transportation provides the Virginia 511 service, which may be accessed by the 511 telephone number, the https://www.511.vdot.virginia.gov website, and Twitter. In May 2012, VDOT introduced the Virginia 511 smartphone apps for Apple and Android devices. The Virginia 511 system provides traffic cameras, real-time road and traffic conditions, trip planning, weather information, and alternatives to traveling by car.

== Controversies ==
=== Closing of rest areas ===
In July 2009, the Virginia Department of Transportation closed 19 of its rest areas around the state, leaving some stretches of highway, such as I-81 which is a popular route for trucks, or the heavily traveled and often congested I-95 northbound between Washington, D.C. and Richmond, a distance of 106 miles (171 km), without a rest stop. Drivers complained that people who needed to use the restroom would have nowhere to go. The Virginia Department of Transportation countered that the I-95 corridor is highly developed, and many businesses have restrooms, and that closing the rest stops would save the Virginia Department of Transportation 9 million dollars toward its 2.6 billion dollar budget deficit.

In January 2010, governor Bob McDonnell announced that he would reopen all of the closed rest areas as part of his campaign promises. The state is using an "adopt a rest stop" program, pulling 3 million dollars from the reserve maintenance fund, and employing non-violent inmates to help reopen the rest stops. They all reopened on April 17, 2010.

=== Roadside memorials ===
VDOT roadside memorial sign

Spontaneous roadside memorials, often in the form of white crosses, Stars of David, bouquets of flowers, and photos of the dead, have been placed along roads at the scenes of fatal accidents. As of July 1, 2003, Virginia law has banned these memorials. Transportation officials have deemed them a threat to the safety of motorists.

Virginia law §33.2-216 prohibits any person from installing a memorial on any highway controlled by the Virginia Department of Transportation without a permit. The Virginia Department of Transportation will install a roadside memorial sign, normally for a period of two years. The sign may not deviate from the standard roadside memorial sign specifications. The cost must by paid by the person requesting the sign.

Not everyone agreed with the new program. Vowing to ignore the program, Del. Robert G. Marshall (R-Prince William), whose son was killed in an auto accident along I-81 in November 2001, said:

This is the bureaucratization of love. I don't like it one bit. I intend to put a cross up for my son. Period.

By marking an accident site, survivors create "a living memory of this person's life," said Donna Schuurman, president of Association for Death Education and Counseling. Americans have swept the grieving process under the rug, and now it's popping up in public ways that few expected—and that some don't like, according to Ms. Schuurman.

=== HOT lanes ===
In 1995, Virginia passed the Public-Private Transportation Act, which allows the state to enter into agreements with private entities to construct, improve, maintain and operate transportation facilities. Since then, Virginia has proposed or awarded several PPTA contracts, including:

- Capital Beltway (I-495) HOT Lanes (Completed in November 2012)
  - 14 miles of four HOV/HOT lanes on the Capital Beltway between the Springfield Interchange and just north of the Dulles Toll Road
- I-95 / I-395 HOT Lanes (proposed)
  - 56 miles from the Pentagon to Spotsylvania County
    - The HOT lanes were complete in December 2014, but the lanes stretch from just north of Edsall Road to Garrisonville

HOT lanes are toll lanes operating alongside existing highway lanes. They provided drivers with a faster and more reliable travel option. Buses, carpools, motorcycles and emergency vehicles will be able to use the HOT lanes for free while drivers with fewer than three occupants can use the HOT lanes by paying a toll. The HOT lanes will use dynamic or congestion pricing to manage the number vehicles, and to keep them free-flowing. On average, vehicles are expected to be traveling 55 miles per hour, even during peak travel times.

The first HOT Lanes in the nation to open was the 91 Express Lanes project in Orange County, California, opening in December 1995. A computer adjusts the toll every six minutes, raising it if too many cars are on the highway, lowering it if the highway is underutilized. Even drivers who will not pay the toll appreciate the HOT lanes diverting traffic form the regular highway.

But many people are not happy about the proposed HOT lanes in Northern Virginia. In 2001, Maryland governor Parris N. Glendening (D) stopped a state study of similar proposals for the Maryland side of the Capital Beltway. The governor believed it would be unfair to low-income residents to allow affluent drivers to buy their way out of traffic.

In 2003, the Virginia Department of Transportation Commissioner Philip A. Shucet stated that "[s]ingle drivers could pay $1 to $4 to get off of the congested regular lanes." By 2009, transportation planners in Washington estimated the projected rush-hour toll need to be $1.60 a mile. According to VDOT's web site:

There will be no toll cap, as tolls must be able to increase to the level necessary to manage real-time traffic demand and keep the lanes congestion free.

Those who own property along the path of the Capital Beltway HOT Lanes are growing increasingly agitated with the project. Supervisor Sharon Bulova (D-Braddock), who represents a number of neighborhoods affected by the construction, said:

Once the project is truly underway, eventually pretty much all the trees in the VDOT right of way are going to be cleared ... I know I didn't have an appreciation of the extent of the clearing that was going to be done ... Do they really need to clear every teeny piece of vegetation in their right of way?

== History ==
The Virginia General Assembly established the first State Highway Commission in 1906.

In 1927, the Virginia Department of Highways was established as a state agency.

VDH became the Virginia Department of Highways and Transportation in 1974, adding railroads and public transportation to its portfolio.

In 1986, the General Assembly authorized expanded revenue sources for transportation, including airports and seaports. Also during that same special session, the General Assembly formally renamed the agency the Virginia Department of Transportation.

The General Assembly spun off the Virginia Department of Transportation's rail and public transportation into a new department, the Department of Rail and Public Transportation. The DPRT reports directly to the Virginia Secretary of Transportation.
