= Virginia Department of Motor Vehicles =

Governmental agency

Virginia Department of Motor Vehicles (Virginia DMV)
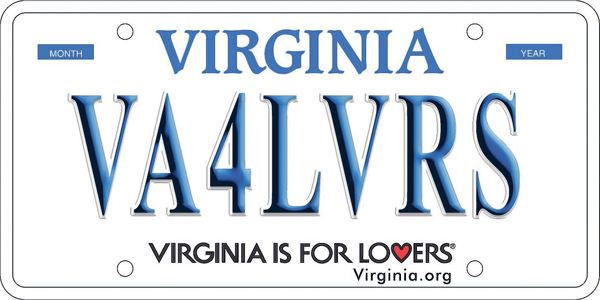
- Post-2014 Virginia license plate

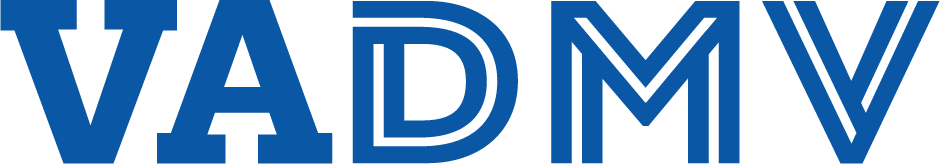

Agency overview
- Formed: 1924; 102 years ago
- Jurisdiction: Virginia
- Headquarters: Richmond, Virginia
- Employees: 1,996 full-time equivalent positions
- Annual budget: $282.5 million
- Agency executive: Gerald Lackey, Commissioner
- Parent agency: Virginia Secretary of Transportation
- Website: https://www.dmv.virginia.gov

The Virginia Department of Motor Vehicles (Virginia DMV) is the governmental agency responsible for vehicle titling and registration, driver licensing and maintenance of driver and vehicle records. The agency also collects Virginia's fuel tax, monitors the state's trucking industry and serves as Virginia's Highway Safety Office. In addition, the agency effectively enforces motoring and transportation-related tax laws, and efficiently collects and distributes transportation-related revenues.

== Motor vehicle registration ==
The Virginia Department of Motor Vehicles (Virginia DMV) serves a customer base of approximately 423,000 ID card holders and 6.2 million licensed drivers with over 7.8 million registered vehicles in Virginia. Virginia DMV has more daily face-to-face contact with Virginia's citizens than any other state agency. The agency also serves a wide array of businesses including dealers, fuel tax customers, rental companies, driving schools, other state agencies, local governments, and non-profit organizations.

Through the headquarters in Richmond, Virginia DMV operates customer service centers, call centers, weigh stations, DMV Selects, and mobile visits known as DMV Connect. Virginia DMV also provides service by Internet, automated telephone, and mail.

More than 50 services, including address updates and vehicle registration renewals, are available on DMV's Online Services page without visiting one of 76 customer service centers throughout the state.

== Driver licensing ==
All data is based on fiscal year 2023 (July 2022 – June 2023) unless otherwise indicated. As of 2023, Virginia DMV has:

ID Card Holders	620,416
Licensed Drivers	6.2 million
Registered Vehicles	7.8 million
Registered Motorcycles	190,025
Customer Service Centers (CSCs)	76
DMV Select Agents	60
Fixed Weigh Stations	13
Mobile Weigh Stations	12
Number of Trucks Weighed	29.2 million
Citations Issued	27,895
Dealer Licenses	4,191
Salesperson Licenses	21,305
Driver Training Schools	327
Driver Improvement Clinics	390
Total License Plate Sets Sold	1.7 million
Seat Belt Usage Rate*	75.6%
Safety Belt Violations*	20,953
Number of Fatalities*	907

- Highway Safety data is based on calendar year 2023.

== Incidents ==
For eight days beginning August 25, 2010, the Virginia DMV's computer system had an outage. The VADMV was unable to process driver's licenses and other important transactions. The incident cost the state $1.2 million. It was the worst DMV computer outage since 2007.
