= Virginia Department of Aviation =

State government agency in Virginia

Agency overview
- Formed: 1979; 47 years ago
- Type: Department
- Jurisdiction: Virginia
- Headquarters: Richmond, Virginia
- Website: doav.virginia.gov

The Virginia Department of Aviation is the executive branch agency of the state government responsible for aviation in the state of Virginia in the United States. Established in 1979, the agency is headquartered at Richmond International Airport and is overseen by the Virginia Secretary of Transportation, with an agency director appointed by the Governor of Virginia. The mission of the agency is to "Progressively develop and maintain a safe, technologically advanced, market driven air transportation system that provides the citizens of Virginia with convenient and efficient access to the expanding world community."
