= Glenn Youngkin =

Governor of Virginia from 2022 to 2026

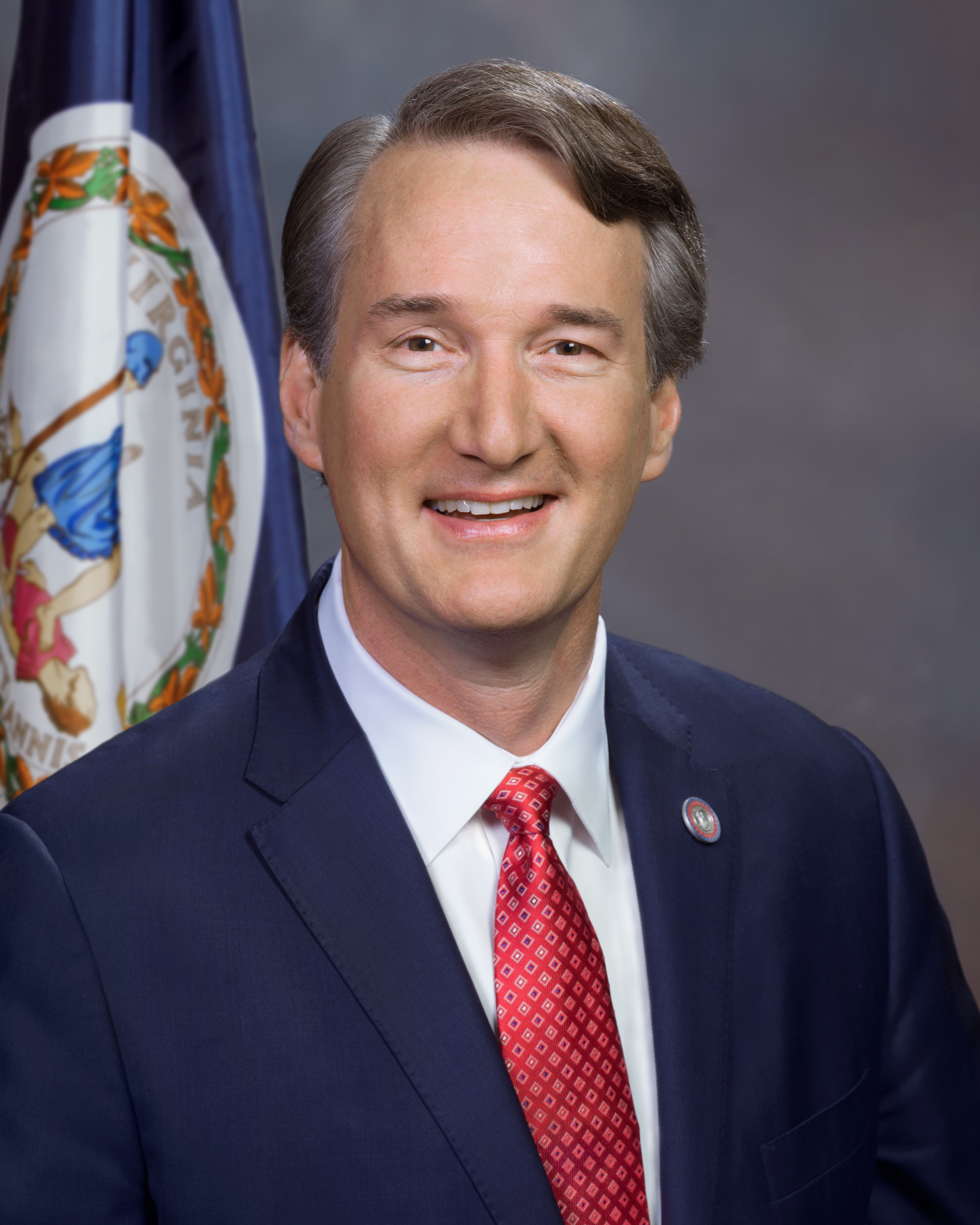
- Official portrait, 2022

74th Governor of Virginia
- In office January 15, 2022 – January 17, 2026
- Lieutenant: Winsome Earle-Sears
- Preceded by: Ralph Northam
- Succeeded by: Abigail Spanberger

Personal details
- Born: Glenn Allen Youngkin; December 9, 1966 (age 59) Richmond, Virginia, U.S.
- Party: Republican
- Height: 6 ft 5 in (195 cm)
- Spouse: Suzanne Schulze (m. 1994)
- Children: 4
- Education: Rice University (BA, BS); Harvard University (MBA)
- Website: Campaign website
- Glenn Youngkin's voice Youngkin on the resiliency of the U.S. economy Recorded April 1, 2020

Glenn Allen Youngkin (born December 9, 1966) is an American politician and businessman who served as the 74th governor of Virginia from 2022 to 2026. A member of the Republican Party, he spent 25 years at the Carlyle Group, a private equity firm, where he became co-CEO in 2018.

Born in Richmond, Youngkin won the 2021 Republican primary for governor of Virginia and defeated former Democratic governor Terry McAuliffe in the general election, becoming the state's first Republican governor since Bob McDonnell in 2009. Youngkin supported COVID-19 vaccination efforts against the disease but opposed vaccine mandates, and banned mask mandates in Virginia public schools; this ban was partially rescinded following legal challenges. During his first year in office, Youngkin signed a bipartisan state budget that paired increased education spending with expansive tax cuts.

During his term as governor of Virginia, Youngkin signed a bill passed by Democrats to protect same-sex marriage, repealed protections for transgender students in schools, unsuccessfully advocated for abortion restrictions after the Supreme Court's Dobbs v. Jackson Women's Health Organization ruling, and opposed various legislative efforts to liberalize recreational marijuana laws while signing a bill to ease the medical marijuana registration process.

Due to term limits set in Virginia's constitution, Youngkin was ineligible to run for re-election in 2025. He was succeeded by Democrat Abigail Spanberger.

== Early life and education ==
Glenn Allen Youngkin was born in Richmond, Virginia, on December 9, 1966. He is the son of Ellis (née Quinn) and Carroll Wayne "Yunk" Youngkin. His father played basketball for Duke University and worked in accounting and finance. His mother was a doctorally prepared nurse practitioner who specialized in women's health; she was also a professor of nursing, and an associate dean for graduate studies at Florida Atlantic University. Youngkin has a sister, Dorothy Marian "Dottie" Youngkin Kouba. When he was a teenager, the family moved from Richmond to Virginia Beach. He attended the private Norfolk Academy in Norfolk, Virginia, graduating in 1985. He received numerous high school basketball honors.

Youngkin attended Rice University in Houston, Texas, on a basketball scholarship. He played four seasons for the Owls in the Southwest Conference, and he totaled 82 points and 67 rebounds in his career. In 1990, he graduated with a Bachelor of Arts in managerial studies and a Bachelor of Science in mechanical engineering. He attended Harvard Business School and earned a Master of Business Administration (MBA) degree in 1994.

== Career ==
=== Early career ===
After graduating from Rice in 1990, Youngkin joined the investment bank First Boston, where he worked on mergers and acquisitions and capital market financing. The company was bought out by Credit Suisse and became Credit Suisse First Boston; Youngkin left in 1992 to pursue an MBA.

In 1994, after receiving his MBA, he joined the management consulting firm McKinsey & Company.

=== The Carlyle Group ===
In August 1995, Youngkin joined the Washington, D.C. private-equity firm The Carlyle Group, initially working as a member of the US buyout team. In 1999, he was named a partner and managing director of Carlyle. He managed the firm's United Kingdom buyout team (2000–2005) and its global industrial sector investment team (2005–2008), dividing his time between London and Washington.

In April 2008, Carlyle's founders asked Youngkin to step back from deal-making to focus on the firm's broader strategy. In 2009, the founders created a seven-person operating committee, chaired by Youngkin, which oversaw the non-deal, day-to-day operations of Carlyle. Also in 2009, Youngkin and Daniel Akerson joined the firm's executive committee, which had previously consisted solely of the three founders. When Carlyle's chief financial officer Peter Nachtwey left the firm suddenly in late 2010, Youngkin became interim CFO until Adena Friedman was hired as CFO late March 2011. In 2010, Youngkin joined the firm's management committee. Youngkin was chief operating officer of the Carlyle Group from March 2011 until June 2014.

Youngkin played a major role in taking Carlyle public, supervising the initial public offering. In June 2014, Youngkin and Michael J. Cavanagh became the firm's co-presidents and co-chief operating officers. Together, they helped develop and implement the firm's growth initiatives and managed the firm's operations on a day-to-day basis. Cavanagh left the firm in May 2015 to become CFO of Comcast, leaving Youngkin as president and COO of Carlyle.

==== Co-CEO ====
In October 2017, the Carlyle Group announced that its founders would remain executive chairmen on the board of directors but step down as the day-to-day leaders of the firm. The firm named Youngkin and Kewsong Lee as co-CEOs effective January 1, 2018. Youngkin oversaw Carlyle's real estate, energy, infrastructure businesses, and investment solutions businesses, while Lee oversaw the firm's corporate private equity and global credit businesses. Youngkin and Lee also joined the firm's board of directors when they became co-CEOs. During Youngkin and Lee's tenure as co-CEOs, they oversaw the firm's transition from a publicly traded partnership into a corporation.

Bloomberg News described the co-CEO relationship as "awkward ... and increasingly acrimonious". The publication later wrote that Lee "quickly established dominance, diminishing Youngkin's clout". This situation was largely due to Lee being given control of the firm's corporate private equity and global credit units—which were bigger and more profitable than the firm's other units—at the onset. Youngkin retired from the Carlyle Group at the end of September 2020, after serving as co-CEO for about 30 months. Youngkin stated that he intended to focus on community and public service efforts.

== 2021 gubernatorial election ==
Final results by county and independent city: Glenn Youngkin: 80–90%; 70–80%; 60–70%; 50–60%; 40–50%; Terry McAuliffe: 80–90%; 70–80%; 60–70%; 50–60%

In January 2021, Youngkin declared that he would seek the Republican Party of Virginia's nomination for governor of Virginia. Youngkin's personal wealth gave him the ability to self-fund his candidacy, and he spent at least $5.5 million of his own money on his primary campaign. Youngkin was endorsed by Ted Cruz during the primary; Cruz has described Youngkin as a close family friend. Youngkin had previously donated to Cruz's 2018 re-election campaign.

After multiple rounds of ranked-choice voting at 39 locations across the state, Youngkin won the Republican nomination at the party's state convention on May 10, 2021. He defeated six other candidates. All the Republican candidates, including Youngkin, stressed their support for Donald Trump and Trumpism; however, other candidates for the nomination—such as state senator Amanda Chase—were more vocally pro-Trump than Youngkin was. After winning the nomination, Youngkin was endorsed by Trump. He called the endorsement an "honor", but sought to distance himself from some of Trump's most ardent supporters. The New York Times wrote in October that Youngkin had sought to localize the race. Youngkin openly courted both Trump supporters and never-Trump voters.

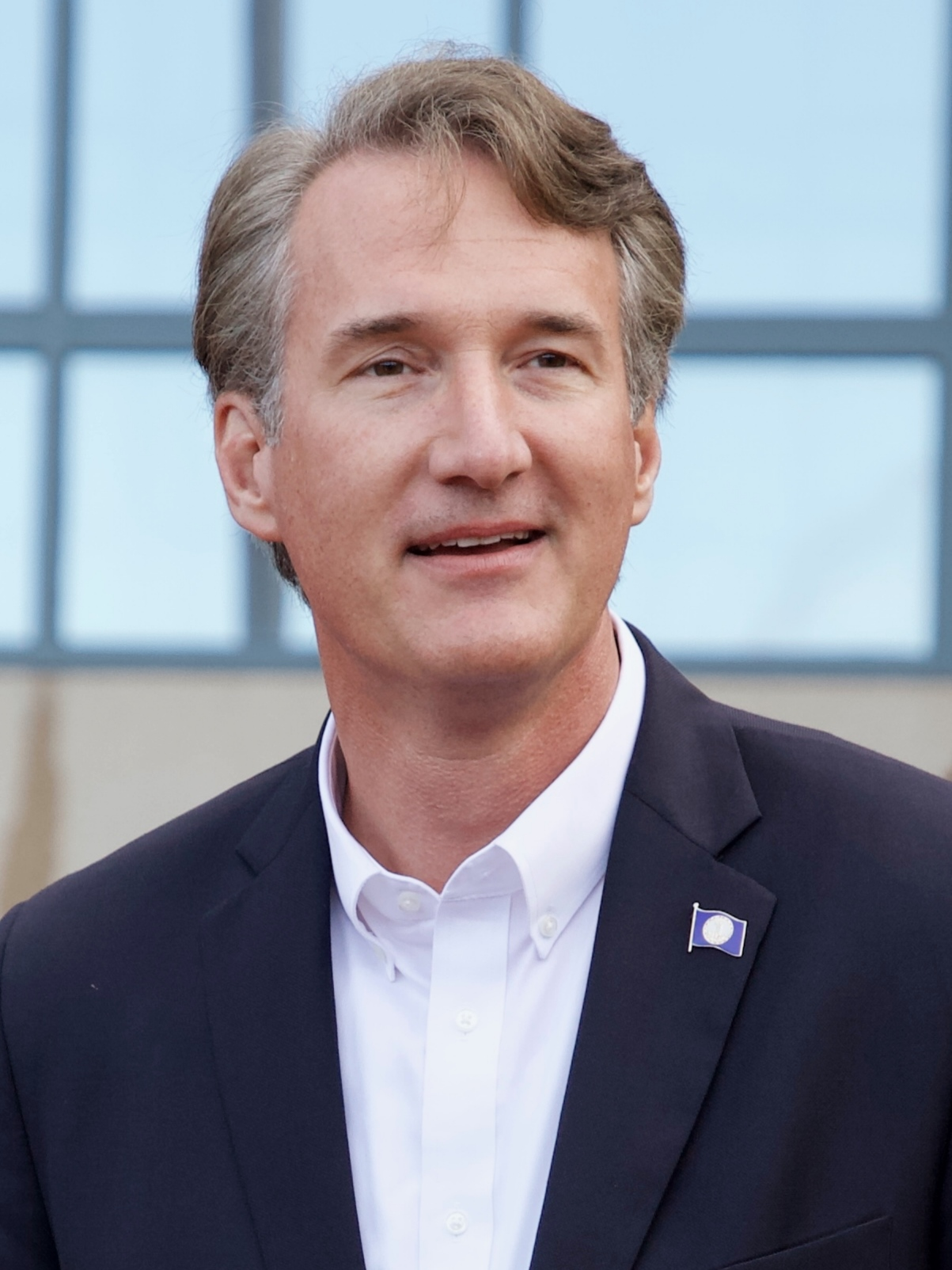
Youngkin in September 2021, less than two months before the general election

Youngkin's Democratic opponent in the general election, Terry McAuliffe, had previously served as governor from 2014 through 2018. The Virginia constitution bars governors from serving consecutive terms, and McAuliffe sought to become the first Virginia governor to serve two terms since Mills Godwin. On July 12, 2021, Youngkin declined to face McAuliffe in the Virginia Bar Association debate, citing his objection to the moderator, Judy Woodruff, for a donation she made to the Clinton Bush Haiti Fund in 2010. The VBA had held a gubernatorial debate every election year since 1985. McAuliffe and Youngkin went on to debate two times during the campaign.

According to PolitiFact, before the Republican convention, Youngkin "toed a delicate line when asked whether Biden was legitimately elected. He acknowledged that Biden was president without clearly saying whether the president was fairly elected. After the convention, Youngkin began acknowledging Biden's election was legitimate". Amanda Chase, who advanced conspiracy theories about the 2020 presidential election, acted as a campaign surrogate for Youngkin after losing the Republican primary to him. The Associated Press noted that, while running for governor, Youngkin "failed to refute a conspiracy theory" about the 2020 election. Several months after Biden was inaugurated, when asked at a rally if Trump could be restored as president, Youngkin replied, "I don't know the particulars about how that can happen because what's happening in the court system is moving slowly and it's unclear".

Youngkin made a campaign appearance with Mike Pence in August. Former Trump advisor Steve Bannon spoke in support of Youngkin at an October rally which also featured a video appearance from Trump. Youngkin did not personally attend the October rally, although he thanked the host for holding it. He later called it "weird and wrong" when that rally opened with attendees pledging allegiance to a flag that had flown, in the words of the event emcee, "at the peaceful rally with Donald J. Trump on Jan. 6".

When asked by Axios during the campaign whether he would have voted to certify Biden's election had he been a member of Congress at the time, Youngkin initially refused to answer. A few days later, Youngkin's campaign released a statement confirming that Youngkin would have voted to certify Biden's election. Throughout the campaign, he continued to emphasize "election integrity" as a major theme and voiced support for stricter voting laws, such as a photo ID requirement.

While running in the Republican primary, Youngkin had pledged to "stand up against all of the legislation that has been passed by the Democrats" and to be an opponent of abortion. At that time, he spoke out against gun legislation that Democrats had passed. After winning the nomination, he de-emphasized these social issues, seeking to appeal to suburban swing voters. In July, the NRA Political Victory Fund (NRA-PVF) declined to grade or endorse Youngkin after he declined to complete their candidate survey. In September, a Democratic-aligned group sought to diminish Republican turnout by running ads in conservative parts of Virginia attacking Youngkin's lack of an NRA endorsement.

During his second debate against McAuliffe, Youngkin stated that McAuliffe had vetoed legislation that would have required schools to inform parents about sexually explicit content in educational materials. McAuliffe defended his veto, saying: "'I'm not going to let parents come into schools and actually take books out and make their own decision... I don't think parents should be telling schools what they should teach'". This quote was described by Politico as "a widely perceived gaffe that Republicans quickly pounced on", and Youngkin used it to create an attack ad. Following the election, Newsweek cited polling data showing that McAuliffe's comment on the veto had been "a major factor in the race".

The legislation discussed by Youngkin and McAuliffe during their debate exchange had originated when a conservative activist attempted to have the book Beloved by Toni Morrison removed from high school curricula in Virginia. This activist was featured in an ad for Youngkin's campaign, although the ad did not specify which book the activist had opposed or that her child had been a high school senior when the book was assigned. Youngkin's focus on the legislation, known as the "Beloved Bill", was criticized by Virginia Democrats, who accused him of targeting a black author. Both McAuliffe and Richmond mayor Levar Stoney called Youngkin's use of this issue "a racist dog whistle". Youngkin countered that some Virginia Democrats had voted for the bill. NBC News wrote that Beloved "erupted as a flashpoint in the closing days of Virginia's race for governor", and The Washington Post wrote shortly before the election that the book had "suddenly become the hottest topic" in the campaign.

On November 2, 2021, Youngkin defeated McAuliffe, 50.6%–48.6%. Before the 2021 elections, Republicans had not prevailed in a statewide race in Virginia since 2009. Youngkin's victory was attributed to a coalition of voters, including suburban residents who had supported Joe Biden in 2020 and Trump supporters. His win was called one of the "great upsets in modern politics"; with Youngkin advisor Jeff Roe attributing their victory to Democrats acting like "revolutionaries" and "talking past their voters".

== Governor of Virginia (2022–2026) ==
=== Inauguration ===
Youngkin was sworn in as governor on January 15, 2022. He took office alongside his Republican ticket mates, Lieutenant Governor Winsome Earle-Sears, the first woman of color elected to statewide office in Virginia, and Attorney General Jason Miyares, the first Latino elected to statewide office in the state. The Washington Post called this ticket "historically diverse" and reported that it was a sign of "inroads" made by the Republican Party "in the African American and Latino communities." Former Democratic Governor of Virginia Douglas Wilder commented after the election that Republicans had "one-upped" Democrats with the historic achievement, which, he said, showed that Democrats "can't take the [Black] community for granted."

Youngkin was inaugurated two years into the ongoing COVID-19 pandemic. His first week in office coincided with the January 14–17, 2022 North American winter storm. The Richmond Times-Dispatch reported that the morning before his inauguration, Youngkin participated in a community service project at "the Reconciliation Statue along the Richmond Slave Trail in Shockoe Bottom, which was home to the second largest domestic slave market in the United States before the Civil War." Later that night, an inauguration eve party was held for Youngkin at the Omni Richmond Hotel. Another inauguration eve event for Youngkin was later held at the Science Museum of Virginia. On the night of his inauguration, Youngkin held a celebratory event at the Richmond Main Street Station.

The Washington Post wrote that Youngkin's inaugural address "delivered the blend of religious confidence and boardroom bravado that powered his victory", while The Associated Press characterized the address as one that carried "a tone of bipartisanship and optimism". The former publication noted that Youngkin used the address to criticize modern politics as "too toxic", but also wrote that, immediately after the address, Youngkin "stirred partisan rancor" by signing a series of polarizing executive actions. It further noted that Youngkin's praise for the COVID-19 vaccine "fell flat with the largely mask-free crowd". Multiple publications reported that Youngkin's biggest applause was for a line about "removing politics from the classroom".

=== Day one executive actions ===
After his inauguration, Youngkin signed eleven executive actions. The first of these bans the teaching of what it calls "inherently divisive concepts" and identifies critical race theory as one such concept. In his executive order, Youngkin characterized critical race theory and related concepts as "political indoctrination" that "instruct students to only view life through the lens of race and presumes that some students are consciously or unconsciously racist, sexist, or oppressive, and that other students are victims." The Washington Post noted that while critical race theory specifically refers to "an academic framework that examines how policies and laws perpetuate systemic racism in the United States", the term has been reappropriated by conservatives "as a catchall symbolizing schools' equity and diversity work." Youngkin's stance on critical race theory has been condemned by leaders of the Virginia Legislative Black Caucus, and according to The Richmond Times-Dispatch, has "alarmed many educators" in the state. Youngkin's critics, the publication wrote, view the banning of critical race theory as an attempt to "whitewash" history and "erase black history".

Two of the executive actions signed by Youngkin on his first day in office rescinded COVID-19 regulations that had been enacted by the previous administration; one of these actions rescinded Virginia's statewide mask mandate for public schools and attempted to make compliance with local public school mask mandates optional; the other rescinded the COVID-19 vaccine mandate for all state employees. Additionally, one of Youngkin's Day One executive orders called for a reevaluation of the workplace safety standards that had been adopted by the Northam administration as a protection against COVID-19.

The other executive actions taken by Youngkin on his first day in office were devoted to firing and replacing the entire Virginia Parole Board, calling for the state's Attorney General to investigate the handling of sexual assaults that had recently occurred in the Loudoun County public school system, initiating reviews of the Virginia Parole Board, the Virginia Department of Motor Vehicles, and the Virginia Employment Commission, creating commissions to combat antisemitism and human trafficking, ordering state agencies under Youngkin's authority to reduce nonmandatory regulations by 25%, and calling for the state to reevaluate its membership in the Regional Greenhouse Gas Initiative.

The Washington Post noted that Youngkin's first executive orders had gone "far beyond the practice of his predecessors in the Executive Mansion over the past 20 years", writing that while each of those predecessors had focused their first executive actions on "less incendiary topics", such as anti-discrimination protections and policy studies, Youngkin's first executive actions, "by contrast...poked a stick directly into a host of polarizing issues". Former Lieutenant Governor of Virginia Bill Bolling, a Republican, condemned Youngkin's repeal of public school mask mandates, saying that it introduced "unnecessary controversy, confusion and litigation" and calling it "in direct conflict with an existing state law." The legality of Youngkin using an executive order to ban the teaching of critical race theory has also been called into question. The Washington Post noted that no governor had "banned critical race theory via executive order" before Youngkin and predicted that any such order would face court challenges, writing that it was "not clear" whether Youngkin would be exceeding his legal authority by issuing such an order. Despite criticism from the left his order was never successfully challenged or struck down by the courts and remained in force during his tenure.

==== Lawsuits ====
Two lawsuits were brought in January against Youngkin's executive order nullifying local public school mask mandates in Virginia. One of the lawsuits was brought by a group of parents from Chesapeake and the other was brought by seven of the state's school boards. The lawsuits argued that Youngkin's executive order infringed upon local control given to Virginia school boards by the state constitution and violated a state law requiring that Virginia public schools comply with CDCP health guidelines "to the maximum extent practicable". The ACLU, representing a group of medically vulnerable students in Virginia, brought an additional lawsuit in February, arguing that Youngkin's policy violated the Americans with Disabilities Act by discriminating against students who would be at high risk if infected by COVID-19. Youngkin called on Virginia parents to cooperate with school principals while the lawsuits proceeded.

A majority of public school districts in Virginia refused to comply with the executive order and continued to enforce local mask mandates into February. On February 4, an Arlington County judge ruled to allow mask mandates to be temporarily retained in the seven school districts that had sued to stop Youngkin's order while their case proceeded through the courts. Three days later, the Virginia Supreme Court dismissed the lawsuit brought by the group of parents from Chesapeake; the dismissal was for procedural reasons and did not rule on the legality of Youngkin's executive order, nor did it overturn the ruling that had been issued that week in Arlington County. The same day that the Chesapeake lawsuit was dismissed, the Youngkin administration joined a lawsuit against the Loudoun County school system, brought by a group of parents in that county, who were challenging their school system's decision to continue enforcing a mask mandate.

School systems throughout Virginia began dropping their mask mandates in mid-February, after Youngkin signed a bill requiring that they do so by March 1. The ACLU expanded the scope of its lawsuit against the Youngkin administration to include this new law, and on March 23, 2022, a federal judge decided the lawsuit by ruling that school districts in Virginia could choose to require masking in areas frequented by the plaintiffs. The ruling did not overturn Youngkin's executive order or the state law and only applies to school systems attended by the plaintiffs. Following an appeal by the Youngkin administration, a settlement was reached in December 2022. The settlement allows mask mandates under similar terms to those established by the March court ruling.

=== Cabinet ===
Youngkin began nominating his sixteen-member cabinet on December 20, 2021, and did not finish the process until after his inauguration. According to The Washington Post, Youngkin assembled his cabinet at a slower pace than prior Virginia governors. Commenting on this process, the publication wrote in December 2021, "The slow pace has turned the quadrennial parlor game of predicting Cabinet picks into a far more protracted and opaque process [than usual], with lobbyists, interest groups and other Richmond insiders left guessing what the new administration might look like. Youngkin's practice of sidestepping many policy specifics during the campaign has only heightened the anticipation."

Several news outlets noted that Youngkin's focus on education as a campaign priority was reflected in his decision to begin his cabinet nominations with his choice for Secretary of Education. Although Youngkin suggested while campaigning for the Republican gubernatorial nomination that he would name his then-opponent Kirk Cox, a former Speaker of the House of Delegates, to the position, he instead chose Aimee Rogstad Guidera, the founder of a data firm focused on fostering student achievement.

Five of Youngkin's cabinet nominees were women and three were African American. Many of his nominees were brought in from other states, and only a few of his nominees had any prior government experience. The Washington Post wrote of these nominees, "Their newcomer status is on brand for Youngkin, who ran touting his lack of political experience as an asset. But it also presents the new administration with a steep learning curve."

To serve as his chief of staff, Youngkin chose Jeff Goettman, who served as a Treasury Department official in the first Trump administration before becoming the chief operating officer of Youngkin's campaign. Youngkin and Goettman share a professional background in private equity. Kay Coles James, who was the first Black woman to serve as president of the Heritage Foundation, a conservative think tank, joined Youngkin's administration as Secretary of the Commonwealth. For the role of counselor, a cabinet-level position, Youngkin chose Richard Cullen, an attorney described by The Washington Post as "the ultimate Richmond insider". Cullen had been chairman of McGuireWoods, and in the 1990s, served out the remainder of Jim Gilmore's term as Attorney General of Virginia, after Gilmore resigned to run for governor. The Washington Post reported that Cullen's appointment was "widely seen as a nod to the establishment class" and theorized that the choice "could suggest that Youngkin does not intend to thoroughly disrupt 'politics as usual' in a state where cozy ties between government and business interests have long been lauded - and derided - as 'the Virginia way.'" The publication further wrote, "At the very least, the choice indicates that Youngkin wants an experienced political hand on his team as he tries to get his arms around the state's sprawling bureaucracy."

==== Chief Diversity Officer ====
Youngkin finished his cabinet nominations on January 19, 2022, with his choice for chief diversity officer. This position was established by Youngkin's immediate predecessor, Ralph Northam, in response to a scandal involving racist imagery appearing on Northam's medical school yearbook page - a scandal that nearly caused Northam to resign from office. The idea for a Chief Diversity Officer was born out of a commitment made by Northam to focus the remainder of his term on advancing racial equity in Virginia. Youngkin did not nominate for Chief Diversity Officer until after his inauguration, which led to media speculation that he would be eliminating the position. Youngkin's nominee for Chief Diversity Officer, Angela Sailor, was an executive at the Heritage Foundation and held multiple roles in George W. Bush's presidential administration.

Virginia's chief diversity officer oversees the state's Office of Diversity, Equity and Inclusion, which was designed under Northam to "address systemic inequities" existing within the state government. Upon nominating Sailor, Youngkin issued an executive order restructuring the agency. The order said that the agency would "be an ambassador for unborn children", devote resources towards emphasizing parental involvement in public school education, take an increased role in "[assisting] Virginians living with disabilities and bringing Virginians of different faiths together", elevate "viewpoint diversity in higher education", and focus on creating "equal opportunity" for every Virginian. Youngkin sought to rename the agency as the Office of Diversity, Opportunity and Inclusion, but a legislative proposal to do so was voted down in the state senate.

==== Andrew Wheeler nomination ====
Youngkin's initial nominee for Secretary of Natural Resources, Andrew Wheeler, was voted down on a party-line vote in the Democratic-controlled State Senate. Wheeler had served as Administrator of the Environmental Protection Agency in the Trump administration, and before that, worked as a coal lobbyist. His tenure at the EPA was marked by reversals of environmental regulations that had been implemented by the Obama administration, and his nomination to serve in Youngkin's cabinet was heavily criticized by environmental advocates. A letter signed by 150 former EPA employees was sent to the Virginia legislature expressing opposition to Wheeler's nomination.

As noted by The Washington Post, cabinet nominees almost always receive bipartisan support in Virginia state politics; although prior Virginia governor Bob McDonnell withdrew one of his cabinet nominees in response to Democratic opposition, only one cabinet nominee before Wheeler had ever been formally voted down by the Virginia state legislature - Daniel G. LeBlanc, an AFL–CIO chief whose nomination by Tim Kaine to serve as Secretary of the Commonwealth was rejected by Republicans in 2006. Wheeler served as acting Secretary of Natural Resources until mid-March 2022, when Youngkin appointed him as a senior advisor, a role that does not require confirmation by the legislature. In June of that year, Youngkin appointed Wheeler to direct the Office of Regulatory Management, an office newly established by Youngkin through executive order for the purpose of reducing state regulatory requirements. Just as Wheeler had done with his advisory role, he was able to assume his role at the Office of Regulatory Management without legislative approval.

Leading up to the vote on Wheeler's nomination to serve as Secretary of Natural Resources, Republicans in the Virginia House of Delegates retaliated against Democrats for opposing the nomination, by both blocking the reappointment of a judge to the State Corporation Commission and leaving two Virginia Supreme Court vacancies open. After Wheeler's nomination was defeated in the State Senate, House Republicans, with Youngkin's support, planned to reject about 1,000 people nominated by Northam to state boards; it was a long-standing custom in Virginia politics for an outgoing governor's nominees to be confirmed with bipartisan support. Many of the nominees had already been serving in their positions for several months. After Democrats responded by threatening to reject all future appointments made by Youngkin, Republicans scaled back their plan and rejected only eleven of Northam's nominees. The rejected nominees had been nominated to the Virginia State Board of Education, the State Air Pollution Control Board, the State Water Control Board, the Virginia Safety and Health Codes Board, and the Virginia Marine Resources Commission. According to Republican leadership in the Virginia House of Delegates, vacancies were created on these specific boards so that Youngkin would have greater influence over boards related to his main policy priorities. Democrats retaliated in turn by rejecting four of Youngkin's five nominees to the Virginia Parole Board and one of his nominees to the Virginia Safety and Health Codes Board.

According to The Washington Post, conflict continued to escalate throughout the 2022 legislative session between Youngkin and Democratic state legislators as a result of the dispute that had begun with Wheeler's nomination. Youngkin went on to issue more vetoes during that session than any of his immediate predecessors had done during their own first years in office. All of the bills vetoed by Youngkin had been sponsored by Democrats and had passed the legislature with bipartisan support. In several cases, Youngkin vetoed bills sponsored by Democratic state senators while signing identical bills that had been sponsored by Republican delegates. It is common for identical bills to be passed in both chambers of the Virginia legislature, and it is considered standard for governors to sign both versions of such bills. In response to Youngkin's vetoes, The Washington Post wrote, "Typically a governor signs both versions, allowing both sponsors bragging rights for getting a bill passed into law. Longtime state legislators said they could not think of a case in which a governor signed one bill and vetoed its companion." The publication further wrote that "the vetoes were widely seen as payback" for the portion of Youngkin's nominees that had been rejected by Democrats.

==== Unpaid advisors ====
The Youngkin administration had drawn notice from both The Washington Post and The Richmond Times-Dispatch for its use of Matthew Moran and Aubrey Layne as unpaid advisors.

Moran served pro bono in the administration during the first half of 2022 as both Deputy Chief of Staff and Director of Policy and Legislative Affairs. He did so while on paid leave from two political consulting firms; one of these firms "runs public affairs campaigns designed to influence legislators through such things as TV ads and polling", according to The Washington Post. That publication, along with The Richmond Times-Dispatch, noted that Moran's role in the Youngkin administration drew scrutiny for presenting a possible conflict of interest. The former publication wrote at the time that while there was precedent for Virginia governors to have unpaid advisors, "Moran's situation is especially unusual, because he works full time for the administration with a state title, but without upfront disclosure that he's a volunteer on someone else's payroll." In June 2022, the same publication wrote that Moran was "transitioning to a new role as [Youngkin's] full-time senior political adviser".

Aubrey Layne, who served as Secretary of Finance in the Northam administration, has served as an unpaid advisor to his successor in the Youngkin administration, Stephen E. Cummings, and has done so while serving as an executive at Sentara Healthcare.

Richard Cullen, Youngkin's counselor, had said that he personally determined both Layne and Moran's roles in the administration to be in compliance with state ethics rules.

=== Tipline for "divisive practices" ===
During his first week as governor, Youngkin set up an email tipline to receive reports about what he characterized as "divisive practices" in Virginia schools. The tipline was introduced in a January 21, 2022 news release focused on Youngkin's executive order banning school mask mandates. Three days later, Youngkin discussed the tipline on a conservative radio show, where he said that parents should use the tipline to report "any instances where they feel that their fundamental rights are being violated, where their children are not being respected, where there are inherently divisive practices in their schools." Discussing the practices to be reported, he said on the radio show that his administration would "catalogue it all" and begin "rooting it out".

The tipline was described by The Washington Post as "part of a broader push by Youngkin to identify and root out what he called elements of critical race theory in the state's curriculum." The publication further reported that the tipline was viewed by "a teachers union, Democrats in the General Assembly, some parents and other observers...as divisive, authoritarian and unfairly targeting educators." Virginia Republicans defended the tipline by comparing it to systems that previous governors of the state had set up for people to report violations of business regulations and health protocols. On January 26, 2022, a spokesperson for Youngkin tweeted that critics of the tipline had mischaracterized it and described the tipline as "a customary constituent service."

A week after the tipline debuted, CNN reported that the initiative had drawn national attention. Colin Jost derided the tipline on Saturday Night Live during Weekend Update, and John Legend encouraged opponents of the initiative to co-opt the tipline, tweeting, "Black parents need to flood these tip lines with complaints about our history being silenced. We are parents too." Several media outlets reported that critics of Youngkin were spamming the tipline. Describing it as a "snitch line", political scientist Larry Sabato predicted that the tipline would "backfire" on Youngkin. Near the end of January 2022, WSET reported that the tipline had been criticized by "Virginia teachers and the Virginia Education Association...for targeting teachers who are already struggling amid staffing shortages and other challenges related to the COVID-19 pandemic", while The Lead with Jake Tapper reported that the tipline could cause retention problems among Virginia educators.

On February 3, 2022, Youngkin explained that his administration was "responding" to complaints submitted to the tipline but did not say whether there would be ramifications for teachers mentioned in those complaints. That month, it was reported that multiple inquiries by The Virginian-Pilot about how complaints sent to the tipline would be used by the Youngkin administration had gone unanswered and that FOIA requests to see emails sent to the tipline had been denied by the Youngkin administration, citing the "working papers and correspondence" exemption in Virginia's FOIA law. In April, a group of over a dozen media outlets sued the Youngkin administration for access to the emails. The lawsuit argued that the "working papers and correspondence" exemption did not apply in this instance, because access to the emails had not been restricted solely to Youngkin's office (Youngkin had allowed a conservative think tank to access the emails). In August of that year, a nonprofit watchdog group, American Oversight, and a law firm, Ballard Spahr, joined in bringing a second lawsuit against the Youngkin administration, seeking access to the emails. In November, the first lawsuit concluded with a settlement that granted the media outlets access to 350 of the emails, representing a small portion of the total number. Shortly after the settlement was reached, the Youngkin administration revealed that it had closed down the tipline in September. The Washington Post reported that the administration had "quietly pulled the plug on the tipline...as tips dried up". The second lawsuit was ongoing as of November 2022.

=== Loudoun County School Board proposal ===
During Virginia's 2022 legislative session, a bill concerning elections for the Loudoun County School Board was amended by Youngkin in an effort that, if successful, would have caused elections to be held a year in advance for seven of the board's nine members. A spokesperson for Youngkin described the amendment as an attempt at "holding [the board] to account" for their handling of two sexual assaults that had occurred in that county's school system a year earlier. Opposing the Loudoun County School Board over a variety of issues had been a major focus of Youngkin's gubernatorial campaign. In response to Youngkin's proposed amendment, Democrats, several political scientists, and the county school board itself charged that Youngkin was attempting to subvert the election results that had put the board members in office. The Washington Post reported that Youngkin's effort had "stunned many state political observers as an intrusion into local election integrity without modern precedent in Virginia." The publication further wrote that the amendment was one of the "more controversial actions" that Youngkin had taken and led to "one of the harshest partisan eruptions" in the Virginia state legislature since the start of Youngkin's term. Legal scholar A. E. Dick Howard argued that the amendment was likely in violation of Virginia's Constitution, which Howard had helped to write in the 1970s. The proposed amendment passed in the Republican-controlled House of Delegates but was defeated in the Democratic-controlled State Senate.

=== Attempted change of transgender policy regulations ===
In September 2022, the Youngkin administration announced that it would be repealing regulations related to transgender students in Virginia schools. These had been established through a bipartisan bill signed by Northam in 2020. That bill required that policies pertaining to transgender students be in compliance throughout all school districts with "model policies" developed by the Virginia Department of Education. Under Northam, these model policies had mandated that students be allowed access to school facilities and nonathletic school programs corresponding with their gender identity; the policies deferred to the Virginia High School League in matters pertaining to transgender student athletes. The policies also mandated that all school staff use the preferred name and pronoun of each student. Under Youngkin, the model policies were revised to mandate that student-access to school facilities and programs be determined by "biological sex" rather than by gender identity; the policy revisions also mandate that legal documentation be provided before school records can reflect a change in a student's name or gender and that a written request by a parent must be provided before school staff can refer to a student by a different name or pronoun; however even after such a request has been submitted, Youngkin's policies do not compell teachers to refer to transgender students by their name and pronouns. The Washington Post reported that Youngkin's policies could require teachers to out transgender students to their parents, as the policies state that schools cannot "encourage or instruct teachers to conceal material information about a student from the student's parent, including information related to gender."

The Youngkin administration described its policy changes as part of a "commitment to preserving parental rights and upholding the dignity and respect of all public school students." The Washington Post noted that Youngkin's actions fit into a national trend among Republicans, writing that "at least 300 pieces of legislation" curtailing the rights of transgender Americans had been introduced throughout the country in 2022, mostly focusing on children. Despite the legal requirement that they do so, most Virginia school districts had failed to adopt the Northam administration's model policies by the time that the Youngkin administration's replacement policies were introduced. However, other school districts have refused to adopt Youngkin's policies, arguing that such policies violatestate law.

Youngkin's actions were expected to face court challenges. Although the 2020 bill signed by Northam did not specify what Virginia's model policies for the treatment of transgender students should be, it stated that the policies should "address common issues regarding transgender students in accordance with evidence-based best practices" and that the policies should protect transgender students from bullying and harassment. Several legal scholars and Democratic politicians have argued that Youngkin's model policies fail to meet these criteria, and as a result, may be in violation of Virginia law. It has been reported that Youngkin's model policies are likely in violation of the Virginia Human Rights Act, which bans schools from discriminating on the basis of gender identity, and that Youngkin's policy mandating that students use restrooms corresponding with their assigned sex may be unenforceable due to the 2020 court ruling in G.G. v. Gloucester County School Board, which mandated that students in Virginia be allowed to use restrooms corresponding with their gender identity.

Shortly after the Youngkin administration's policy changes, several thousand students from over ninety Virginia schools protested the policies by engaging in walkouts. Organizers of the walkouts stated that the Youngkin administration's policies would "only hurt students in a time when students are facing unparalleled mental health challenges" and called them "a cruel attempt to politicize the existence of LGBTQIA+ students for political gain."

In October 2022, the Youngkin administration placed its model policies, which were set to take effect that month, on hold pending further review. In March 2023, the administration confirmed that the policies were still under review and that no implementation date had been determined.

== Tenure and political positions ==
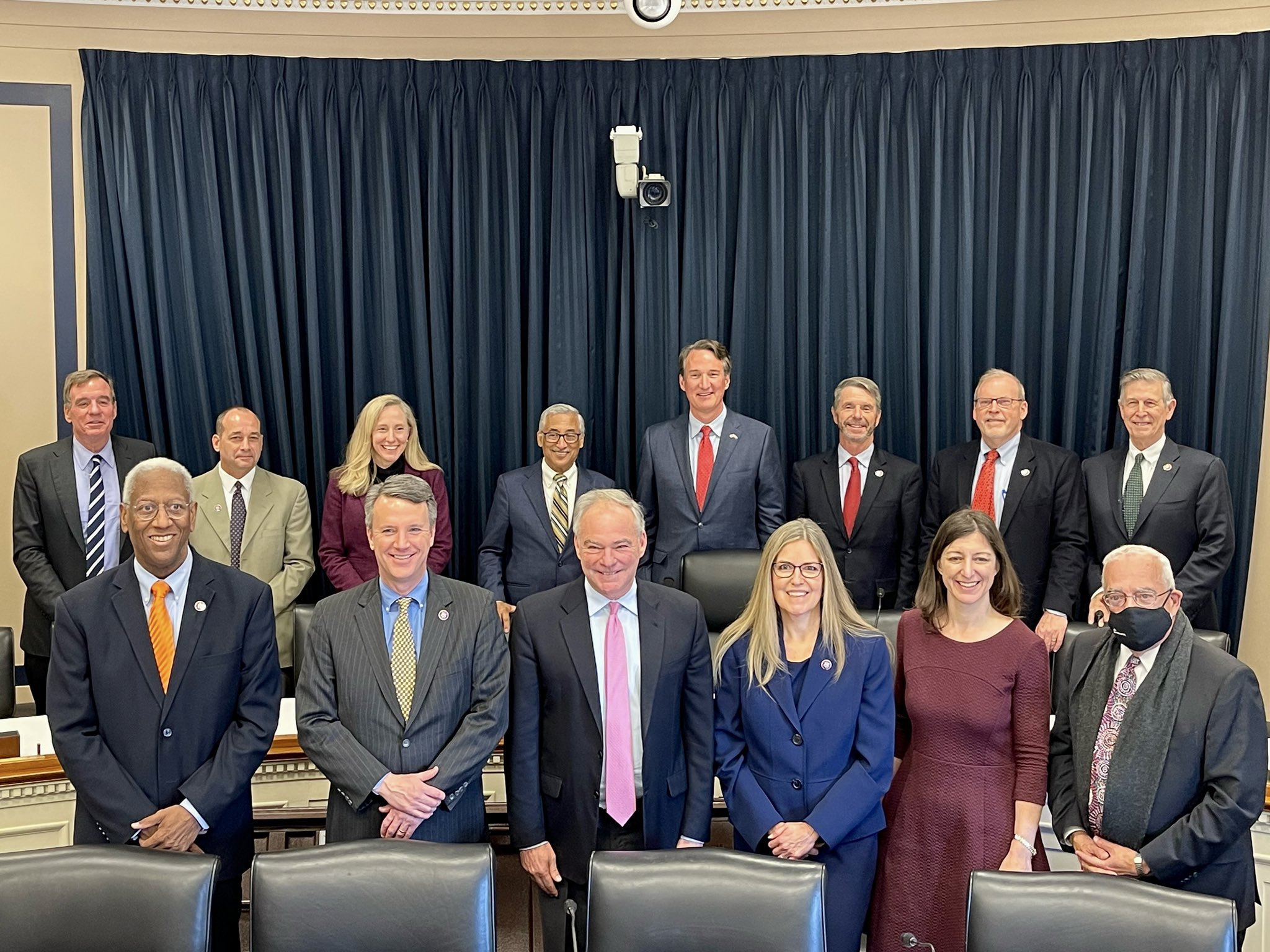
Youngkin with Virginia's congressional delegation in December 2021

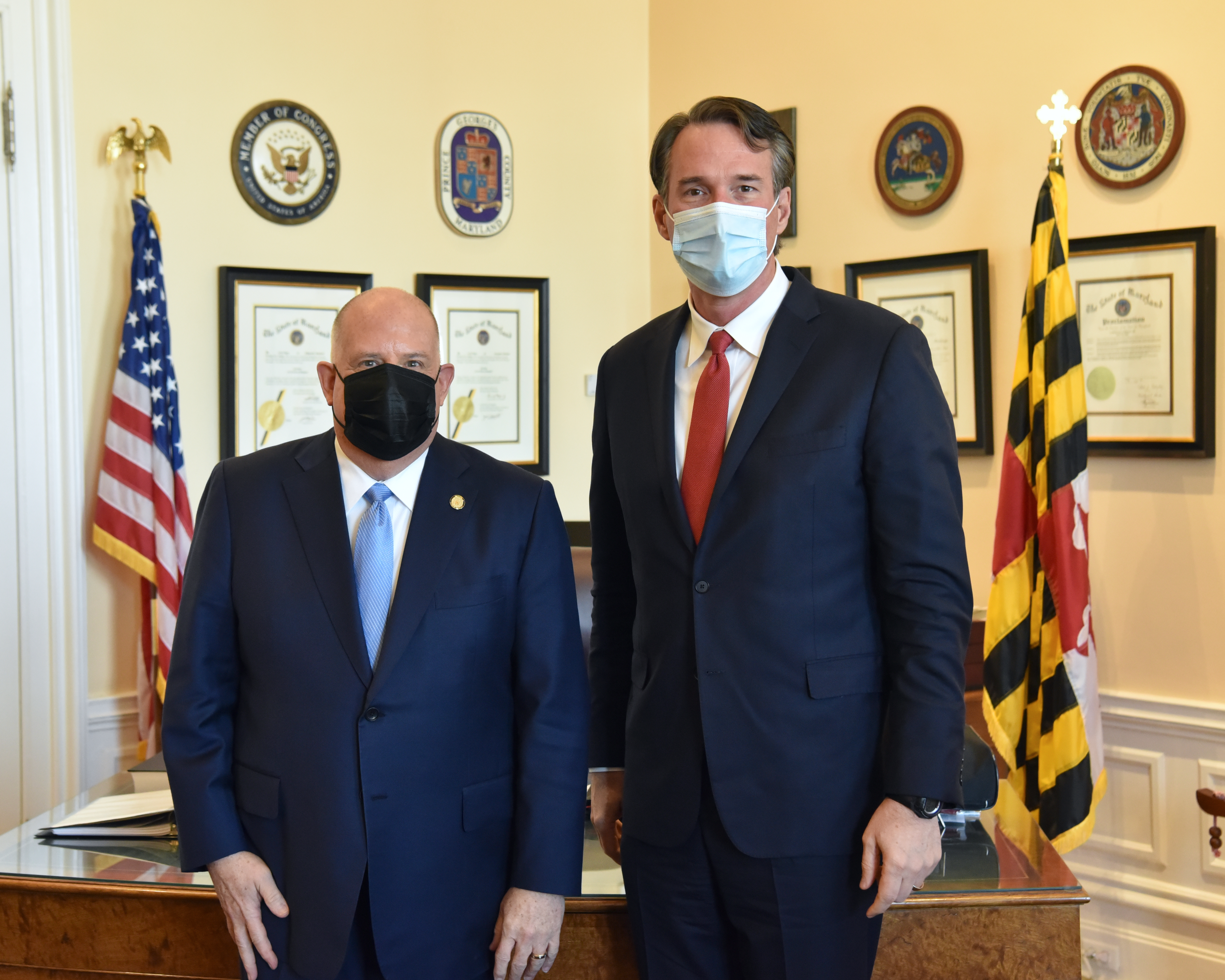
Youngkin with Maryland Governor Larry Hogan in January 2022

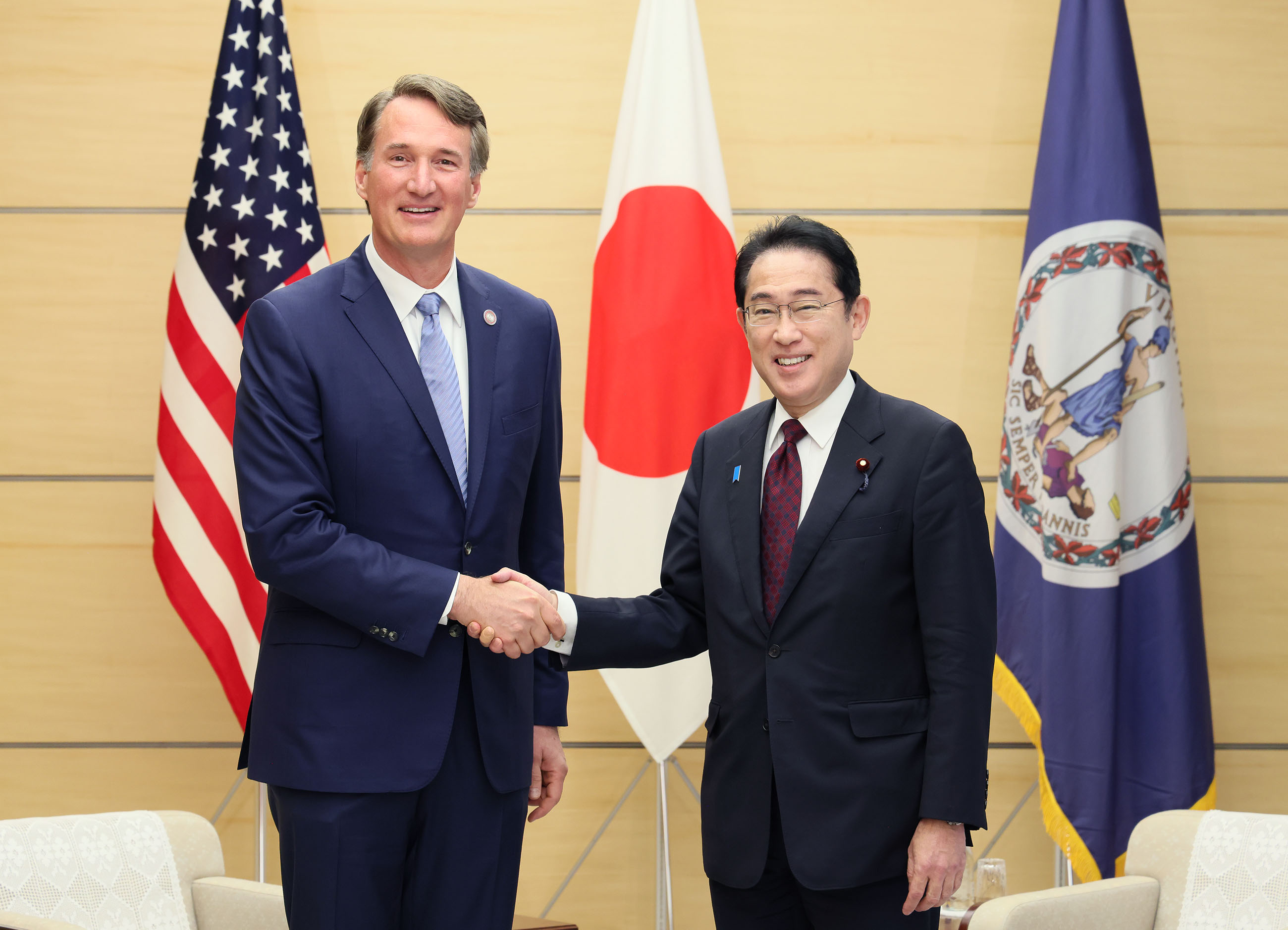
Youngkin with Japanese Prime Minister Fumio Kishida in April 2023

An article from All Things Considered published roughly a week after Youngkin's inauguration, likened his political ideology to that of President Donald Trump, writing that although Youngkin "came to power as a sort of establishment Republican politician, a businessman who spoke to suburban families" and who "gave off ... [a] dad-next-door image", his administration quickly began "leaning into a lot of the same themes as the former president". A year into Youngkin's governorship, The Washington Post called Youngkin "famous for being just Trumpy enough to woo MAGA Republicans without alienating more moderate voters". The newspaper summed up Youngkin's political style by calling him "a genial but aggressive culture warrior who has treaded cautiously with Trump and cozied up to election deniers." As governor, Youngkin subjected many executive branch positions to litmus tests on abortion, critical race theory, and transgender policies. Politico described Youngkin's tenure as "something of a disappointment but was a ... dike in a left-turning state."

In Youngkin's final year in office, NBC News wrote that "he staked out middle ground on social issues" by signing legislation that protects same-sex marriage and arguing for less strict abortion statutes than other Republican lawmakers such as his lieutenant governor Winsome Earle-Sears. In 2026, Youngkin said he had few regrets during his tenure as governor, although he did not accomplish many of his policy goals due to Democrats controlling at least part of the Virginia General Assembly.

During the 2022 United States elections, Youngkin campaigned frequently for Republicans in other states, supporting both candidates who had embraced Trump's false claims about the 2020 election and those who had not. This led to The Washington Post writing that Youngkin had "demonstrated uncommon flexibility on an issue that for others...represents a bright line." Youngkin's refusal to distance himself from conspiracy theorists within his own party has elicited criticism from some Republicans, such as Liz Cheney.

=== Abortion ===
Abortion in Virginia remains legal up to the end of the second trimester of a pregnancy, and Virginia was the only Southern state not to restrict abortion after Roe v. Wade was overturned in 2022. Youngkin advocated for restricting abortion in Virginia, but was unsuccessful. This was because Democrats controlled the Virginia Senate during the first two years of Youngkin's term, and won full control of the Virginia General Assembly in 2023. They maintained a majority in the Virginia Senate in the 2023 Virginia Senate election and won back control of the Virginia House of Delegates in the 2023 Virginia House of Delegates election. This blocked Youngkin from garnering the votes to enact abortion restrictions.

Youngkin describes himself as "pro-life," but supports legal access to abortion in cases of rape, incest, or protecting the mother's life. During his gubernatorial campaign, he criticized the Texas Heartbeat Act, which bans abortions around the sixth week of pregnancy except for when needed to protect the life of the mother. At that time, Youngkin stated his preference for a "pain threshold bill", which bans abortion at around twenty weeks. However, in July 2021 while running for governor, he was caught on a hot mic telling an activist that he would "start going on offense" against abortion rights if elected governor but would largely avoid the topic until then, saying "as a campaign topic, sadly, that in fact won't win my independent votes that I have to get."

As governor, Youngkin introduced a failed amendment to the state budget, that if adopted by the legislature, would have banned the state government from funding abortion services in cases of severe fetal abnormalities. Youngkin claimed that this would have made Virginia's policy on the public funding of abortion services consistent with the federal Hyde Amendment, which allows it only in cases of rape, incest, or to protect the mother's life. In actuality, as noted by the Richmond Public Interest Law Review, Virginia policy on the matter still would have been broader than the Hyde Amendment, as the state law also allows public funding of abortion services when needed to protect the pregnant mother's health.

In May 2022, following the leaked draft opinion of Dobbs v. Jackson Women's Health Organization, Youngkin joined with Maryland Governor Larry Hogan in calling on the federal government to intervene against protests targeting the homes of conservative Supreme Court Justices living in Virginia and Maryland. Youngkin was criticized by some conservatives for seeking federal action rather than enforcing a state law that bars protesters from targeting private residences. The state law was dismissed as "weak" by Youngkin. The Washington Post described the state law's constitutionality as unclear while noting that "enforcement would be up to local authorities in Fairfax County, not the governor." The publication noted that Youngkin and Hogan both believed the protests to be in violation of "a federal law that forbids demonstrations intended to sway judges on pending cases". Youngkin sought to block the protesters by having a perimeter established around Justice Samuel Alito's neighborhood, but his request was denied by Fairfax County officials, on the grounds that they believed such a perimeter would have been unconstitutional. In June 2022, Youngkin responded to the protests by introducing an amendment to the state budget, that if adopted, would have made it a felony in Virginia to participate in any protest seeking to intimidate or influence a judge. That budget amendment was defeated after receiving bipartisan opposition in the state legislature.

After the final opinion in Dobbs v. Jackson was issued, Youngkin expressed his support for the ruling and stated that he would sign "any bill" restricting abortion access in Virginia. He then tasked four Republican state lawmakers with developing legislation on the topic. Advocating for a 15-week abortion ban, he acknowledged that there would be limitations on what could pass through the State Senate, which is controlled by Democrats, and suggested a 20-week ban as a possible compromise. Either ban as proposed by Youngkin would include exceptions for rape, incest, or protecting the mother's life. Youngkin indicated that he would have supported restricting abortion access in Virginia beyond a 15-week ban if he can garner enough votes to do so, which he was unable to do.

=== COVID-19 ===
Youngkin supports the COVID-19 vaccination effort but opposes mask and vaccine mandates. He and his family are vaccinated. In his first address to the General Assembly, he emphasized his position on the state's vaccination efforts by stating, "Speaking to you as your governor, I'll never tell you what you must do. But speaking to you as your neighbor and a friend, I strongly encourage you to get the vaccine."

Shortly before taking office, Youngkin challenged the Biden administration's employer vaccine mandate. After the U.S. Supreme Court ruled in favor of the mandate for certain health care workers but against the mandate for other private employers, Youngkin co-signed a letter with West Virginia Governor Jim Justice, asking the Biden administration to exempt rural and state run hospitals from the mandate, citing staffing shortages at many of those hospitals. In October 2022, after the Centers for Disease Control and Prevention's recommended that the COVID-19 vaccine be added to each state's list of required immunizations for school children, Youngkin stated that he would oppose any effort by the legislature to implement the recommendation.

While running for governor, Youngkin said that he would model his public school mask policy after that of Florida Governor Ron DeSantis by banning local school boards from implementing their own mask mandates. Youngkin reversed this position later in the campaign, saying through his PR team that although he opposed Virginia's statewide public school mask mandate, he would give local school boards the discretion to implement their own mask policies. After winning the election, he re-emphasized his intention to repeal the statewide mandate while still allowing for local mandates. On his first day in office, January 15, 2022, he reversed his position again, signing an executive order that both repealed the statewide mandate and attempted to nullify any local mandates. This executive order was challenged by two lawsuits contending that it was in violation of state law at the time and exceeded Youngkin's constitutional authority. It was also challenged by the ACLU in a lawsuit arguing that the order was discriminatory against medically vulnerable students. Youngkin called on Virginia parents to cooperate with school principals while the lawsuits proceeded. On February 16, 2022, Youngkin signed a bill that made masking optional in all public schools throughout Virginia. The bill passed along mostly party lines and took effect on March 1. The ACLU's lawsuit against the Youngkin administration was decided on March 23, in a ruling that maintains Youngkin's ban on school mask mandates except for in areas frequented by students that were represented in the lawsuit. The Youngkin administration appealed the ruling, and in December 2022, reached a settlement with the plaintiffs. As described by The Associated Press, that settlement "largely tracks the terms" of the court ruling from March. The settlement allows mask mandates to be implemented by Virginia public schools in areas frequented by the plaintiffs, but also allows alternative seating or class assignments for any student impacted by such a mandate who does not want to wear a mask; the settlement further states that schools should consider alternatives to peer masking. Although the settlement applies only to students represented in the lawsuit, the ACLU has expressed the view that the settlement established a precedent allowing the same accommodations upon request for any other medically vulnerable students attending Virginia public schools.

Two other executive actions signed by Youngkin on his first day in office related to his pandemic response policies. One rescinded the COVID-19 vaccine mandate for all state employees; the other called for a reevaluation of the workplace safety standards that the Northam administration had adopted as a pandemic mitigation strategy. On February 16, 2022, Youngkin convened the Virginia Department of Labor and Industry's Safety and Health Codes Board to vote on whether to revoke those safety standards. A few days before the vote, House Republicans rejected the nominations of two members that had been appointed to the board by Northam; both members were expected to vote against revoking the safety standards. Their nominations were rejected as part of a larger process of expelling Northam appointees from several state boards, which was undertaken by Republicans in response to Democrats defeating Youngkin's nomination of Andrew Wheeler to serve as a cabinet secretary.

The remaining members of the Safety and Health Codes Board voted 7 to 3 in favor of recommending that the safety standards be revoked. Following a public comment period, the board reconvened on March 21 and voted to officially revoke the safety standards. Virginia had been the first state to adopt workplace safety standards in response to the COVID-19 pandemic, and the standards, which included a mask mandate for workers in high-risk indoor areas, officially ended on March 23, 2022.

Upon taking office, Youngkin extended a limited state of emergency that had been implemented by the Northam administration ten days earlier to increase hospital capacity and allow medical professionals licensed in other states to practice in Virginia. The extension was originally set to last until February 21, 2022 but was renewed through March 22 of that year.

In January 2022, the Virginia Department of Health, under Youngkin's authority, became one of the first states to cease efforts at contact tracing every positive case of COVID-19. Health officials with the department explained that the decision was made primarily due to the increased difficulty of contact tracing the omicron variant. These officials further explained that the policy would allow the department to better focus its resources on responding to "outbreaks and cases in high risk settings" and that individuals who test positive should continue to personally notify contacts.

In May 2022, Youngkin announced that on July 5 of that year, he would be scaling back the telework policy for Virginia's executive branch employees, which had been expanded two years earlier by Northam in response to the pandemic. Under Youngkin's policy, those employees can telework one day a week or on a temporary basis with approval from the head of their agency, two days a week with approval from a cabinet secretary, and three or more days a week with approval from Youngkin's chief of staff. As noted by The Richmond-Times Dispatch, "employees of state colleges and universities, legislative or judicial agencies, or independent commissions and authorities" are all exempt from the policy.

Youngkin argued that his telework policy would lead to increased innovation and improved customer service across state agencies. Democrats criticized the policy, arguing that it would endanger state workers amid the ongoing pandemic while causing retention problems for state agencies. They called on Youngkin to maintain Northam's policy until at least after Labor Day, so as to ease pressure on state employees struggling to find childcare over the summer. Youngkin's policy also gave state agencies less discretion to approve telework arrangements than they had held before the pandemic began. The Richmond Times-Dispatch reported that Youngkin's policy diverged from private sector trends favoring telework options and could lead to challenges for state employees in rural areas with particularly long commutes. In early June, the Youngkin administration missed a self-imposed deadline for approving telework requests. In between Youngkin's announcement and its implementation on July 5, hundreds of state employees resigned.

=== Criminal justice ===
==== Policing ====
In 2022, Youngkin signed a bill downscaling the Marcus alert system, which had been established by Northam about two years earlier in response to both the George Floyd protests of 2020 and the 2018 killing in Richmond of Marcus-David Peters. Wherever implemented, the Marcus alert system requires that mental health professionals be involved in responding to any mental health crises reported to 911. Certain localities in Virginia began adopting the system in late 2021. When signed into law by Northam, the system was required to be implemented statewide by July 2026. The legislation signed by Youngkin in 2022 exempts Virginia localities with populations of under 40,000 from having to adopt the Marcus alert system. This exemption applies to about 67% of Virginia localities and over 19% of the state's population. It was adopted due to concerns about the cost of implementing the system statewide.

When first established by Northam, the Marcus alert system was criticized by Peters' sister, Princess Blanding, for its slow adoption process and for continuing to give law enforcement a significant role in responding to many mental health crisis situations. Her belief that the Marcus alert system needed to be improved upon led her to run as an independent candidate against Youngkin and McAuliffe in Virginia's 2021 gubernatorial election. Although Youngkin's legislation downscaling the system gained some bipartisan support in the state legislature, it was opposed by Blanding and most House Democrats.

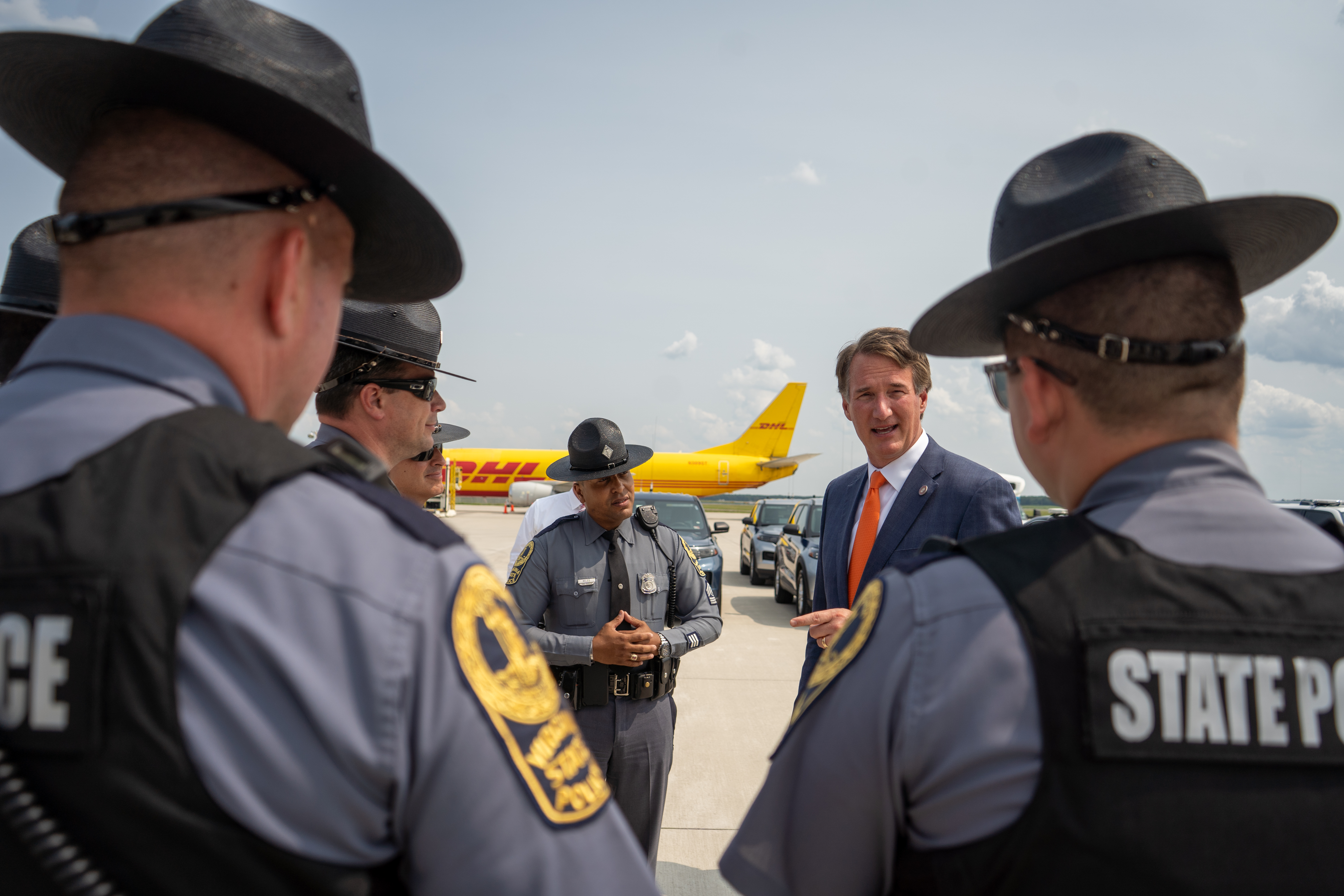
Youngkin with State Police in August 2023

Another bill signed by Youngkin in 2022 bans law enforcement agencies in Virginia from using quotas for ticket-writing or arrests. This bill, which was proposed by the Virginia Police Benevolent Association, also states that "the number of arrests made or summonses issued by a law-enforcement officer shall not be used as the sole criterion for evaluating the law-enforcement officer's job performance." Both parties in the state legislature supported the bill. Although as originally written, the bill provided for violations of its bans to be investigated by the FBI, this provision was removed from the final bill.

==== Sentence credits ====
An amendment that Youngkin introduced to the 2022 state budget limited the number of inmates who could qualify for an expanded early release program that was scheduled to begin later that summer. The program allows inmates in Virginia to earn time off their sentences through good behavior credits. It had been expanded through legislation signed in 2020 by Youngkin's predecessor, Ralph Northam, so that Virginia's cap on how many good behavior credits could be earned was raised for most inmates. As this expansion of the program was originally designed, the newly available credits could not be used to reduce sentences for violent crimes but could be used by inmates convicted of violent crimes to reduce any concurrent or consecutive sentences that had been imposed for nonviolent crimes. Youngkin and other Republicans characterized this aspect of the program as an unintentional loophole that needed correcting. Democrats largely disagreed with that characterization, arguing that the expanded program had been intentionally designed to give violent offenders the ability to reduce sentences unrelated to violent offenses. Youngkin's amendment was adopted by the General Assembly along mostly party lines. It made inmates convicted of violent crimes fully ineligible for the expanded program, meaning that these inmates could not use the newly available credits to reduce any sentences.

Although the expanded early release program was approved by Northam in 2020, it did not take effect until July 1, 2022. Because the newly available credits were made applicable retroactively for anyone who would have earned them earlier in their sentences, about 550 inmates convicted of violent crimes were set to be released once the law took effect in July 2022. Youngkin's amendment was approved a few weeks before these inmates would have been released. As a result, these inmates were not released at that time, even though they had already been told of their planned release.

=== Economy ===
During his campaign for governor, Youngkin frequently said that Virginia's economy was "in the ditch". Some political scientists, such as Mark Rozell, considered this an unusual position, since throughout the campaign, Virginia had low unemployment, a budget surplus, and a AAA bond rating. The state had also been rated that year by CNBC as the Top State for Business. Youngkin argued against the merits of the CNBC rating, stating that it put too much emphasis on inclusivity and noting Virginia's poor ratings in the "cost of living" and "cost of doing business" categories. During Youngkin's first year in office, Virginia lost its top spot on the CNBC list, after having earned that spot twice in a row during Northam's governorship. The lower ranking under Youngkin was due to Virginia earning worse scores in the "life, health and inclusion" and "workforce" categories. Virginia regained the CNBC title as the Top State for Business in 2024.

==== Taxes ====
The Washington Post noted that more than two months after winning the Republican nomination, Youngkin had "yet to disclose any formal economic plan." One of Youngkin's main proposals at that stage of the race was an elimination of Virginia's individual income tax. According to NPR, this proposal received "criticism from both Democrats and Republicans that doing so would wipe out around 70% of Virginia's General Fund." Before the end of his campaign, Youngkin retracted his proposal to eliminate the tax, calling it "aspirational" and saying, "In Virginia, we can't get rid of income tax, but we sure can try to bring it down."

In late August 2021, Youngkin proposed a series of more modest tax cuts, such as eliminating the grocery tax, suspending the gas tax increase, offering a one-time rebate on income tax, doubling the standard deduction on income tax, cutting the retirement tax on veterans' income, implementing voter approval for any increase to local real estate property taxes, and offering a tax holiday for small businesses. Upon their announcement, the Associated Press called these proposals "the most wide-ranging and detailed look at the priorities of a potential Youngkin administration". Had these proposals gone on to be enacted in full, they would have amounted to $1.8 billion in one-time tax cuts and $1.4 billion in recurring tax cuts. During the campaign, Youngkin proposed paying for much of his proposed tax cuts with the state's budget surplus, which at the time, was projected to total $2.6 billion. Although The Washington Post and NPR both noted that much of that revenue would be unavailable for tax cuts, since state law required that over half of the amount be devoted to the state's "rainy day" reserve fund, water quality improvement fund, and transportation fund, Virginia's budget surplus continued to grow, and by the end of Northam's term, was projected to total at least $13.4 billion for the state's then-upcoming budget cycle.

As his campaign's senior economic advisor, Youngkin hired Stephen Moore, who had helped oversee significant tax cuts in Kansas several years earlier when Sam Brownback was in office as that state's governor. NPR noted towards the end of the Virginia gubernatorial campaign that Youngkin "sourced much of his fiscal agenda from [Moore]." In response to Moore's hiring, The Washington Post described the Brownback tax cuts as "an experiment widely seen as a failure, leading the state to slash spending for priorities such as education and transportation when revenue dried up". The publication noted that the tax cuts were ultimately repealed "on a bipartisan vote". Youngkin's Democratic gubernatorial opponent, Terry McAuliffe, cited the economic downturn in Kansas as a way to critique Youngkin's economic platform. Moore acknowledged after joining the Youngkin campaign that the Brownback tax cuts had negatively impacted the Kansas economy but argued that they should be perceived as an anomaly, saying that several other states "did really well when they lowered taxes".

In 2022, Youngkin signed a two-year, $165 billion state budget featuring $4 billion in tax cuts. According to The Washington Post, the "centerpiece" of this budget was "a big increase in the standard deduction for personal income tax." Rather than doubling the standard deduction, as Youngkin had proposed, the budget increased it by about 80%, raising it from $4,500 to $8,000 for individuals and from $9,000 to $16,000 for couples filing jointly. The budget included one-time tax rebates and a partial elimination of Virginia's grocery tax, both of which aligned with Northam's own outgoing budget proposals rather than with Youngkin's preferred tax policies. As Northam had proposed, the one-time tax rebates amounted to $250 for individuals and $500 for couples, slightly less than Youngkin's desired $300 for individuals and $600 for couples, and although the final budget enacted Northam and Youngkin's shared goal of eliminating a 1.5% grocery tax that had been levied by the state, Democrats blocked Youngkin's additional proposal to eliminate a separate 1% grocery tax levied by Virginia localities. Fully included in the budget was Youngkin's proposal to enact a tax exemption of up to $40,000 a year for military pensions. According to The Washington Post, the exemption will be "phased in over several years." Another proposal of Northam's included in the budget was making up to 15% of the earned income tax credit refundable. This policy, designed to benefit low-income tax filers, was described by The Richmond-Times Dispatch as "a longtime Democratic priority" and had been opposed by Republicans. It was included in the budget as a compromise between the two parties.

Youngkin's goal of offering relief from the state's gas tax was blocked by the legislature along mostly party lines. Democrats argued that the plan proposed by Youngkin would have deprived the state of revenue for transportation projects while offering insufficient relief to consumers. According to WVTF, a Virginia NPR affiliate, it was estimated that about one-third of the savings from Youngkin's gas tax holiday proposal would have been kept by the oil industry, while about one-quarter of the savings would have gone to out-of-state drivers. Youngkin acknowledged that his proposal may not have resulted in significant savings for Virginians, saying, "We can't guarantee anything". He opposed a Democratic counter proposal to send direct payments to Virginia car owners. Both WTOP and WRIC estimated that Youngkin's proposal for suspending the gas tax would have decreased funding for Virginia transportation projects by about $400 million.

During the 2022 legislative session, Youngkin failed to enact a proposal of his that would have required Virginia localities with rising real estate values to either gain approval through public referendums for any increases in revenue resulting from local real estate taxes or else lower their local real estate tax rates. This proposal was described by the Youngkin administration as "a pillar" of its tax plan.

Although the budget signed by Youngkin in 2022 passed with bipartisan support, it was opposed by several Democrats who argued that too much of the state's record surplus was spent on tax cuts at the expense of funding for affordable housing, mental health services, gun violence prevention, and transportation.

==== Affordable housing and tenant protections ====
The state budget signed by Youngkin in 2022 included a $150 million investment in the Virginia Housing Trust Fund, which is devoted to providing affordable housing in the state. This amounted to half the total Northam had proposed investing in the fund. According to WVTF, a Virginia NPR affiliate, the state would need to invest $5 billion annually to fully address its affordable housing needs. Youngkin has said that he opposes any further investments in affordable housing.

In 2022, Youngkin vetoed a bipartisan bill that would have given judges the ability to mandate that landlords address code violations. Under current Virginia law, negligent landlords can be fined or have their properties condemned, but localities have no way to mandate that safety hazards be addressed by landlords. In explaining his veto, Youngkin called the legislation "unnecessary" and said that tenants should share responsibility with landlords for maintaining safe living conditions.

==== Failed stadium subsidy plan ====
In 2023, Youngkin made public an agreement with Ted Leonsis, the owner of Washington Wizards and Washington Capitals, to move the teams to Alexandria, VA from downtown Washington D.C. As part of the agreement, Virginia taxpayers were set to pay $1.35 billion for new stadiums for the Wizards and Capitals in Alexandria, the largest public stadium subsidy of its kind. The agreement did not gain approval by Virginia state lawmakers or by local politicians in Alexandria, which doomed the project.

=== Education ===
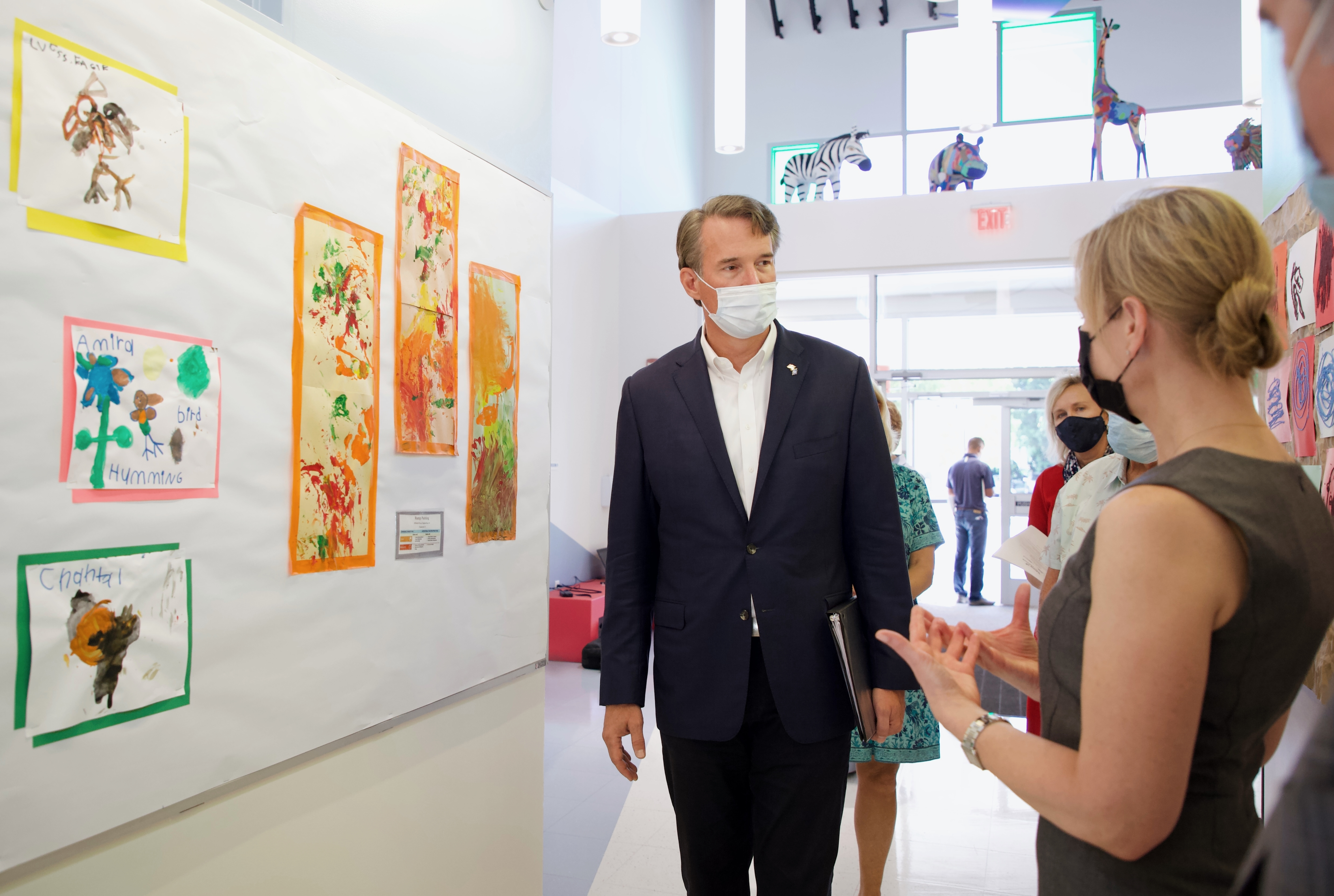
Youngkin on a tour of the New E3 School in Norfolk, Virginia

Youngkin's education platform was identified as the centerpiece of his campaign by much of the national media, and he sought to mobilize voters on the issue by holding Parents Matter rallies. According to Politico, Youngkin "hung his campaign on education". The New York Times wrote that Youngkin's campaign turned Virginia public schools into "a cultural war zone", and a year after the election, The Washington Post wrote that Youngkin "has leaned into culture wars in K-12 education". Noting his stances on how schools approach race, transgender students, and pandemic policies, the publication wrote that Youngkin "has continued to center those issues in office".

==== Cultural issues and curriculum ====
Throughout the campaign, Youngkin spoke against what he characterized as the pervasive teaching of critical race theory in the state. PolitiFact found this characterization of his to be false, saying it found no evidence that critical race theory was part of state curriculum standards and little evidence of it being taught in classrooms. The publication wrote, "Critical race theory is being widely discussed by educators across Virginia. But there's a difference between educators learning about the theory and actually teaching it to students."

The Washington Post identified the Loudoun County school system as "ground zero for Youngkin's victory", citing the widespread activism among parents in the county who opposed progressive school policies. Following two sexual assaults that occurred in Loudoun County schools, Youngkin called for campus police to be stationed at every school in Virginia, and after winning the election, he directed the state's Attorney General, Jason Miyares, to investigate the Loudoun County school system's handling of those assaults. Initially, the perpetrator of the assaults was characterized as gender fluid; although this was later denied by the perpetrator's lawyer, conservative media coverage focused on this aspect of the assaults, and the news story fueled opposition to bathroom policies that had been newly adopted in Virginia to accommodate transgender students. Youngkin's Democratic opponent in the election, Terry McAuliffe, said that the assaults were being exploited during the campaign as "a transphobic dog whistle".

A major subject of opposition among Republicans during the campaign was a state law signed in 2020 by Youngkin's predecessor, Ralph Northam, requiring that all Virginia public schools adopt regulations affirming of transgender students. Youngkin has been critical of these protections. While running for governor, he supported teachers who refused to refer to their students by preferred pronouns and argued against allowing transgender girls to play on girls' sports teams. As governor, he has stated that public school teachers should not conceal information about students from their parents, including their gender identity. His administration has since introduced plans to change the regulations introduced under Northam.

Youngkin's first official action as governor was to sign an executive order banning Virginia schools from teaching critical race theory. The order also bans critical race theory from teacher diversity trainings and any other materials produced by the Virginia Department of Education. The Richmond Times-Dispatch reported that the executive order "targets various initiatives...including the EdEquityVa Initiative, a program aimed at promoting cultural competency in classrooms, higher teacher diversity, and decreasing suspension rates for Black students."

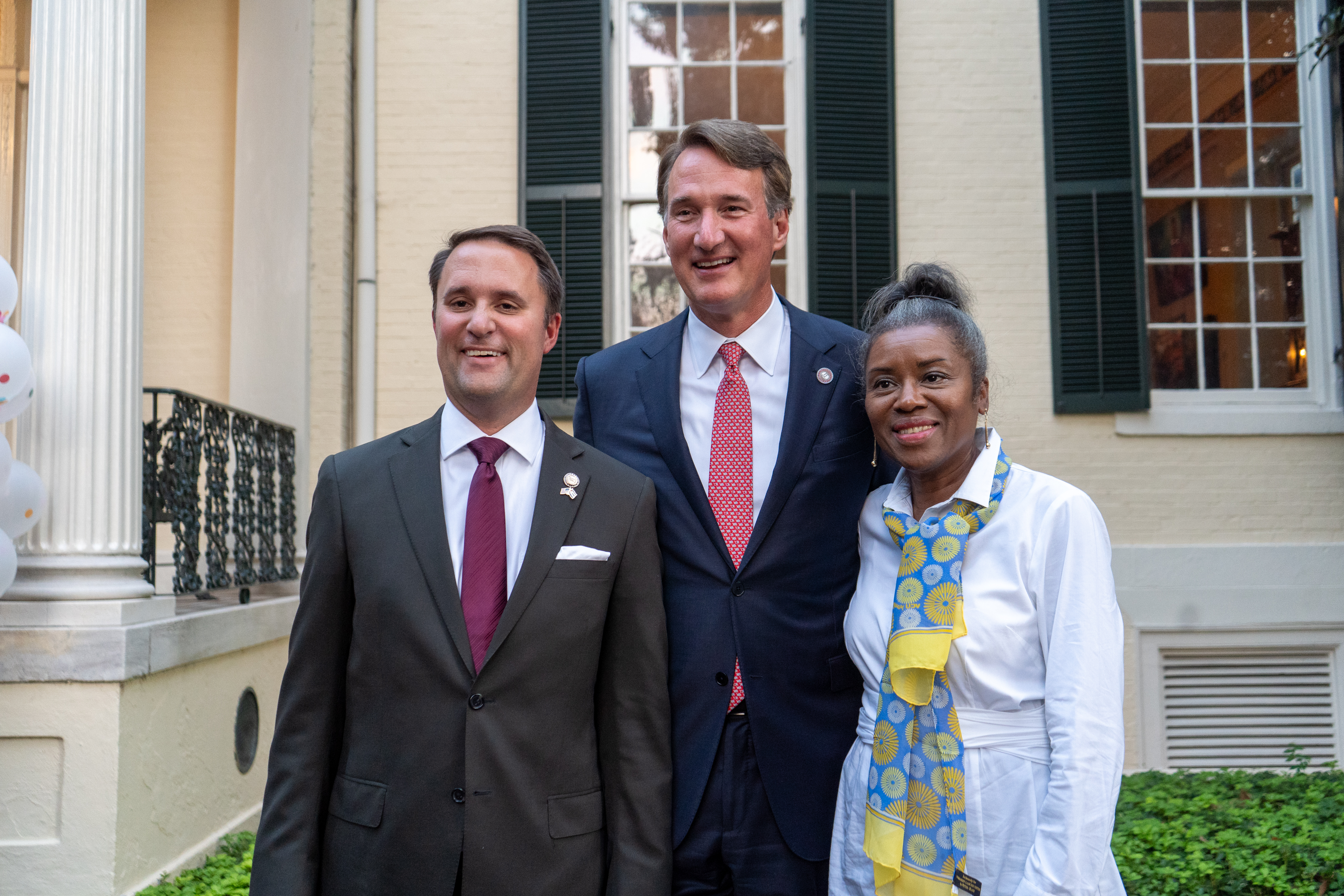
Youngkin with Lieutenant Governor Winsome Earle-Sears and Attorney General Jason Miyares at the Executive Mansion in 2023

This same executive order cancels the Virginia Mathematics Pathways Initiative, a program that had been developed and proposed by the Northam administration in an effort to both close the racial achievement gap and better equip students with modern job skills. According to The Virginian-Pilot, some critics of the program viewed it as "a dumbing down of standards". Youngkin called the program a "left-wing takeover of public education", and many conservatives claimed that it would have eliminated advanced high school math classes - a claim that Youngkin gave prominence to during his campaign. James Lane, Virginia Superintendent at the time, and NPR, both disputed this characterization of the program. The Virginia Math Pathways Initiative would have prioritized data science and data analytics over calculus while still offering students the opportunity to enroll in calculus at an accelerated pace. Although education officials within the Northam administration explored the potential benefits of detracking students prior to the 11th grade, no plans to do so were ever adopted, and in April 2021, those officials explained that the Virginia Math Pathways Initiative was not designed to eliminate advanced math classes at any grade level. Shortly after Youngkin and other conservatives first began speaking out against the Virginia Math Pathways Initiative, The Washington Post reported that the actual nature of the program had been "obscured...[by] prominent Virginians and copious coverage from right-wing news outlets" as "outrage built online" among those opposed to it.

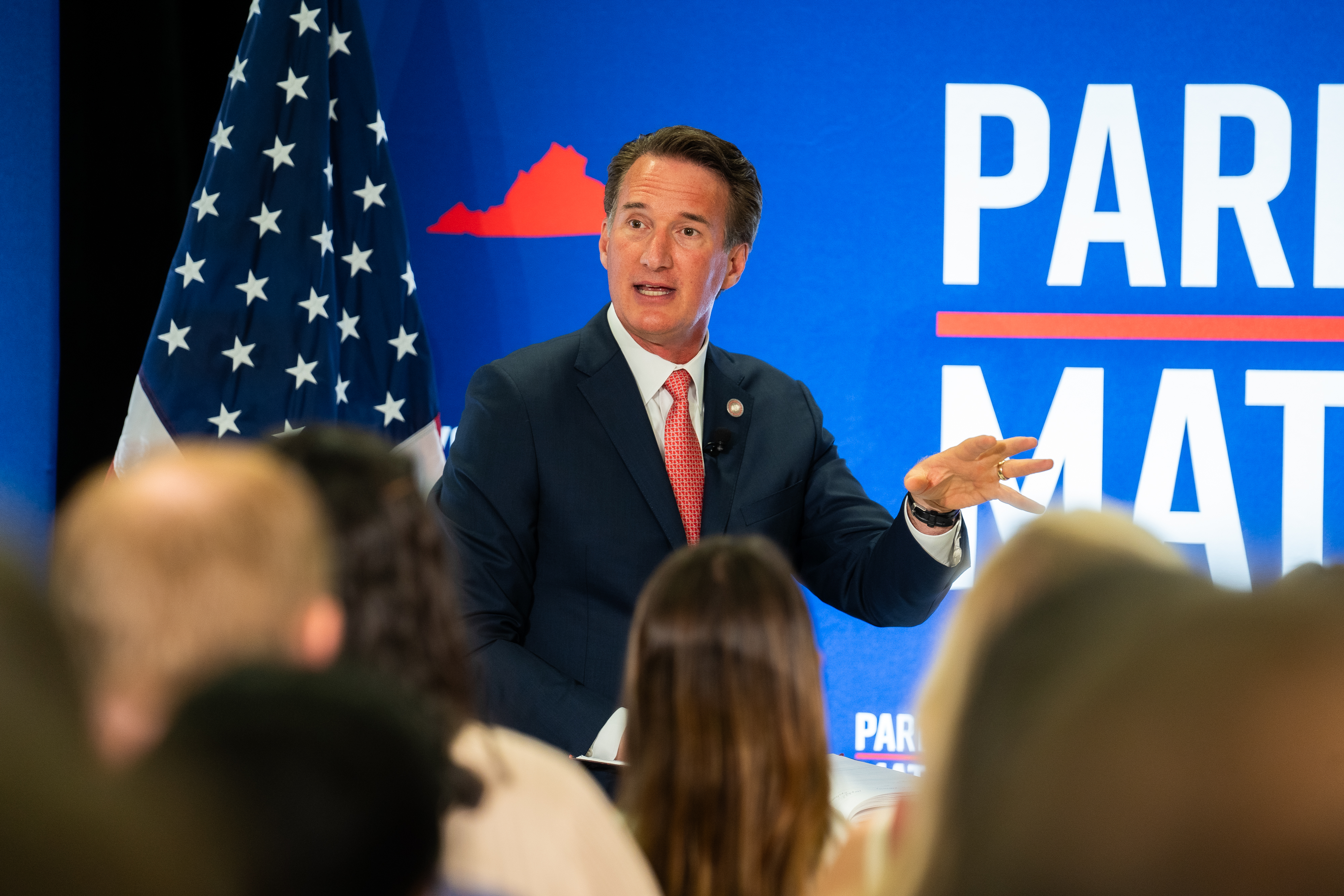
Youngkin hosting a discussion on parents in education during July 2023

In early April 2022, Youngkin signed a bill allowing school parents throughout Virginia to review and opt their children out of any educational material containing "sexually explicit content"; any opted out student would be provided with alternative material. At the start of Youngkin's governorship, there were no statewide laws in the nation allowing for parental review of sexually explicit content in school curriculum. Shortly before Youngkin signed the bill, a similar bill was signed by Florida Governor Ron DeSantis. Virginia Democrats have criticized the bill signed by Youngkin for taking control over education away from local school systems and have argued that its definition of "sexually explicit content" is "overly broad". The bill passed along mostly party lines. A similar bill, known as the "Beloved Bill", was vetoed by McAuliffe in both 2016 and 2017. That bill, which had originated when a conservative activist took issue with the inclusion of Beloved in her high school senior son's AP English class, became one of the focal points of Virginia's 2021 gubernatorial election, and reviving the bill was identified by The Washington Post as "one of the key promises" of Youngkin's campaign. The provisions of the bill will take effect in 2023.

In May 2022, Youngkin sent a letter to the Council of Presidents overseeing Virginia colleges and universities, urging mandatory political diversity in their hiring practices. That year, he introduced a budget amendment, which succeeded in the General Assembly, requiring that the state's public colleges and universities promote "free speech and diversity of thought on [their] campuses."

In August 2022, Youngkin enlisted the Thomas B. Fordham Institute, a conservative think tank, to assist in revising Virginia's educational standards for history and social sciences. In November of that year, the Virginia Department of Education released a proposal for those revisions, which the department stated would make the state's educational standards easier "to understand and implement". The proposal was not adopted by the Virginia Board of Education, after it received what The Washington Post described as "overwhelming pushback from parents, teachers and community members who characterized the new standards as lacking context, being politically motivated and even being 'whitewashed.'" That publication wrote that the proposal "places less emphasis on the perspectives of marginalized peoples, removes suggested discussions of racism and its lingering effects, and promotes the workings of the free market, with limited government intervention".

During the 2022 legislative session, Youngkin advocated for a bill that would have reversed reforms that had been recently adopted to the admissions processes at some Governor's Schools in Virginia, specifically at Thomas Jefferson High School for Science and Technology in Alexandria and at Maggie L. Walker Governor's School for Government and International Studies in Richmond. The reforms that Youngkin wanted to reverse had been adopted to increase racial diversity among the student bodies at those two schools, where Black and Hispanic students had been consistently underrepresented. Although race blind, the reformed admissions processes achieved their goal by implementing an approach largely based on geographic and socioeconomic factors. The bill supported by Youngkin would have banned such an approach, characterizing the use of geographic and socioeconomic factors as "proxy discrimination". This bill passed in the Republican-controlled House of Delegates but failed in the Democratic-controlled State Senate. A separate bill signed by Youngkin that same year bans Governor's Schools in Virginia "from discriminating against any individual or group on the basis of race, sex, color, ethnicity, or national origin in the process of admitting students to such school." This bill, which received bipartisan support, was described by The Richmond Times-Dispatch as "a watered-down version" of Youngkin's preferred bill. According to WRIC-TV, a Virginia ABC News affiliate, it has been argued that the bill signed by Youngkin "has no legal impact because it largely reiterates existing federal law."

==== Education budget ====
Youngkin and McAuliffe both campaigned on increasing the education budget in Virginia, where teacher salaries had perpetually lagged behind the national average. Shortly before leaving office, outgoing governor Ralph Northam proposed increasing Virginia's biennial education budget from $14.8 billion to $17.2 billion, while McAuliffe's platform called for increasing the state's spending on education by $2 billion annually. The two Democrats sought to focus their proposed spending increases on raising teacher salaries, expanding preschool to disadvantaged children, investing more in both STEM programs and ESL services, ensuring internet access for all students, and closing the state's achievement gaps.

In contrast to McAuliffe, who introduced much of his education platform concurrently with his announcement to run in the Democratic primary, Youngkin did not begin sharing proposals for state spending on education until months after securing the Republican nomination. McAuliffe criticized Youngkin for not releasing budget details until late in the campaign and argued that spending on education in Virginia could be threatened by the extent of Youngkin's tax cut proposals. The Washington Post wrote that Youngkin's education platform was "far lighter on details" than McAuliffe's and that it largely focused on cultural issues over budgetary proposals. Youngkin began offering specific proposals for education spending late in the summer of 2021, only a few months before the election. These proposals included $100 million a year for raising teacher salaries, $200 million for improvements to school infrastructure, and over $1 billion for expanding school choice programs.

Youngkin inherited a record surplus in state revenue from Northam, which was projected to continue growing during the state's then-upcoming budget cycle. As a result of this surplus, Youngkin had the opportunity to sign a biennial state budget in 2022 that committed $19.2 billion to education, a record for the state even when accounting for inflation. This exceeded the $16.95 billion in education spending that Republicans had wanted to include in the biennial budget. Republicans agreed to the higher amount as part of a budget compromise with Democrats. In exchange for getting much of their desired education spending enacted, Democrats agreed to enact several of Youngkin's tax cut proposals.

Incorporated into the budget compromise was an outgoing proposal of Northam's to enact a 10% salary increase for Virginia teachers over two years. Also included in the compromise were one-time $1,000 bonuses for teachers. This plan was chosen over the one preferred by Republicans, which would have paired a more modest 8% salary increase for teachers over two years with 1% bonuses.

School construction and maintenance received $1.25 billion in the 2022 biennial state budget. This exceeds the amount that had been allotted for these needs in Northam's outgoing budget proposals but is a small fraction of the $25 billion that the Virginia Department of Education says it would take to fully replace the state's oldest schools.

The Virginia Preschool Initiative was expanded by the 2022 biennial state budget. This program provides preschool for many low-income children in the state. Prior to 2022, the program only served children aged four or older, and only families earning less than the federal poverty line could qualify. The 2022 state budget that Youngkin signed lowered the age eligibility to include three year olds and raised the income threshold to 300% of the federal poverty line.

==== Charter schools and lab schools ====
While running for governor, Youngkin voiced support for expanding charter schools in the state and set a goal of adding at least twenty during his term. After the election, The Richmond-Times Dispatch reported that Youngkin's actual goal for charter schools would be to increase the number in Virginia "to match North Carolina, which has more than 200." Only seven charter schools currently exist in Virginia, one of the lowest amounts in the country, and Youngkin has backed proposed legislation that would shift the authority to approve new charter schools from local school boards to newly created "regional charter school divisions". These divisions would have nine voting members, eight appointed by the Virginia State Board of Education, and one appointed by local school boards within the region.

The state budget that Youngkin signed for 2022 includes $100 million for re-establishing lab schools in Virginia. These K-12 public schools, which are separate from charter schools, had previously existed in the state and had continued to be allowed under Virginia law before Youngkin came into office, but none remained operating in the state by the start of Youngkin's term. Previous lab schools in Virginia had been established as partnerships with institutions of higher learning; only public colleges and universities with teacher training programs were allowed to enter into these partnerships. An amendment that Youngkin introduced to the 2022 state budget removed the requirement that all lab schools in the state act as teacher training programs. It also opened lab school partnerships to be formed with community colleges or certain private universities. Lieutenant Governor Winsome Sears had to break a tie vote in the State Senate for this budget amendment to be approved by the General Assembly. Youngkin has additionally advocated for allowing private businesses to enter into lab school partnerships. He has said that lab schools could be either newly established or converted out of existing schools and has supported legislation that would direct the Virginia State Board of Education to "give substantial preference" to lab school applications filed by historically black colleges or universities. Under that legislation, the same preference would be given to applications seeking to establish lab schools in "underserved communities".

Youngkin supported revising how Virginia public schools are funded, so that per pupil funding for any students attending lab schools in the state would go to the institutions operating the schools attended by those students instead of going to the public school boards for the districts where those students reside. An amendment proposed by Youngkin for the 2022 state budget would have enacted this plan but was not adopted by the General Assembly. Although the Virginia Education Association and the editorial board of The Free Lance–Star have both supported Youngkin's goal of re-establishing lab schools in Virginia, they have also both criticized Youngkin's plan for redirecting per pupil funding away from local school boards, noting that because Virginia law allows lab schools to enroll students from anywhere in the state, the plan could lead to decreased funding for certain school districts.

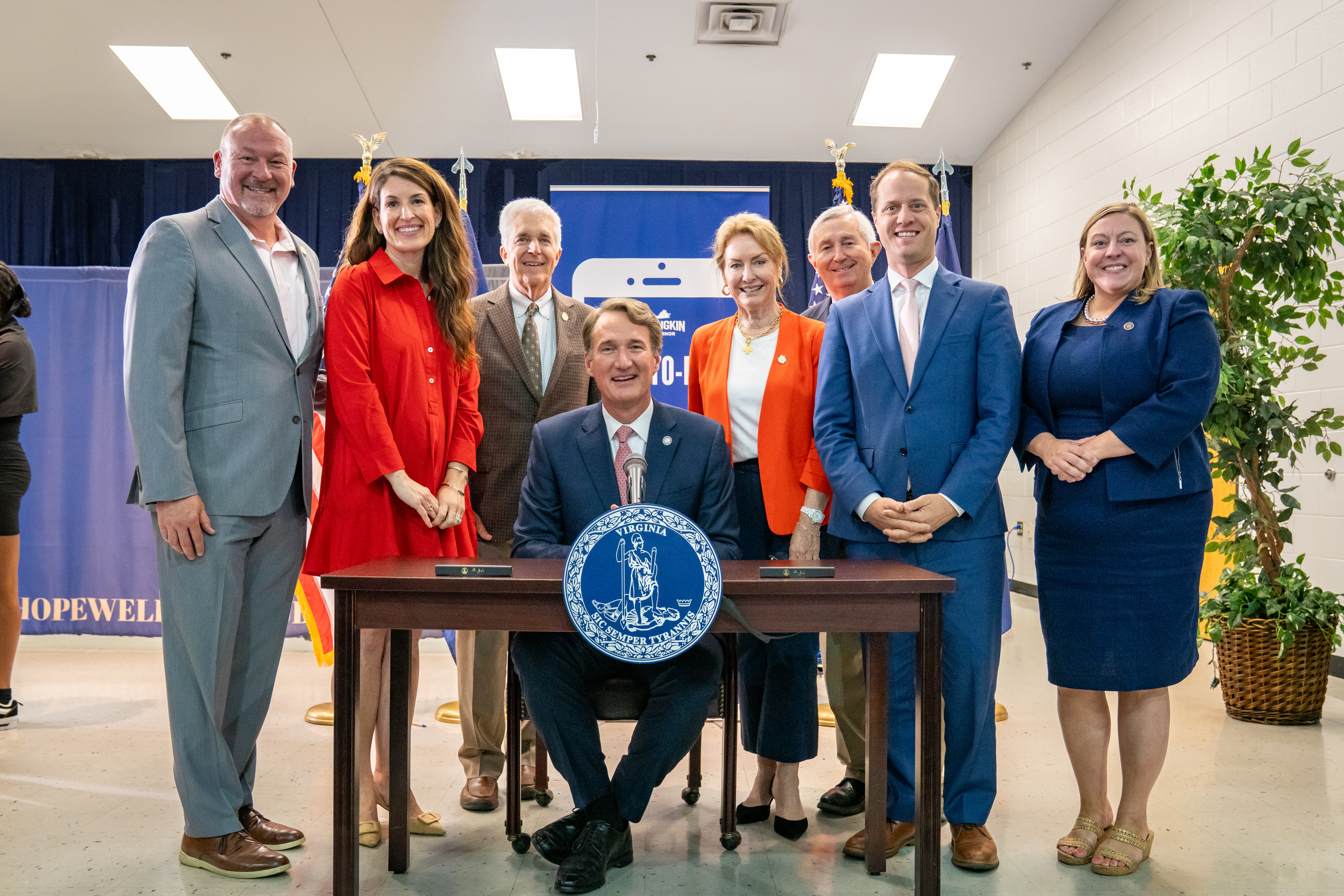
Youngkin signs the 'Cell Phone-Free Education Bill' in Hopewell, Virginia.

==== Public school phone ban ====
On June 9, 2024, Youngkin signed an executive order prohibiting mobile phone use during classtime within public schools (the order omitted lunch time and time between class periods from prohibition). On May 30, 2025 Youngkin signed an executive order completely prohibiting mobile phone use within public schools.

=== Environment ===
Asked if he accepts the scientific consensus on the causes of climate change, Youngkin said he does not know what causes climate change and that he considers the cause to be irrelevant. He supports climate change adaptation efforts such as building additional seawalls. While running for governor, Youngkin said he would not have signed Virginia's Clean Economy Act (which calls for Virginia's carbon emissions to reach net zero by 2050) because he believes it would increase utility prices. Youngkin is in favor of what he calls an "all of the above approach" to energy, saying that he supports both renewable energy sources and natural gas. He has called for Virginia to become a world leader in nuclear energy, proposing that a small modular reactor be built in Southwest Virginia within the next decade.

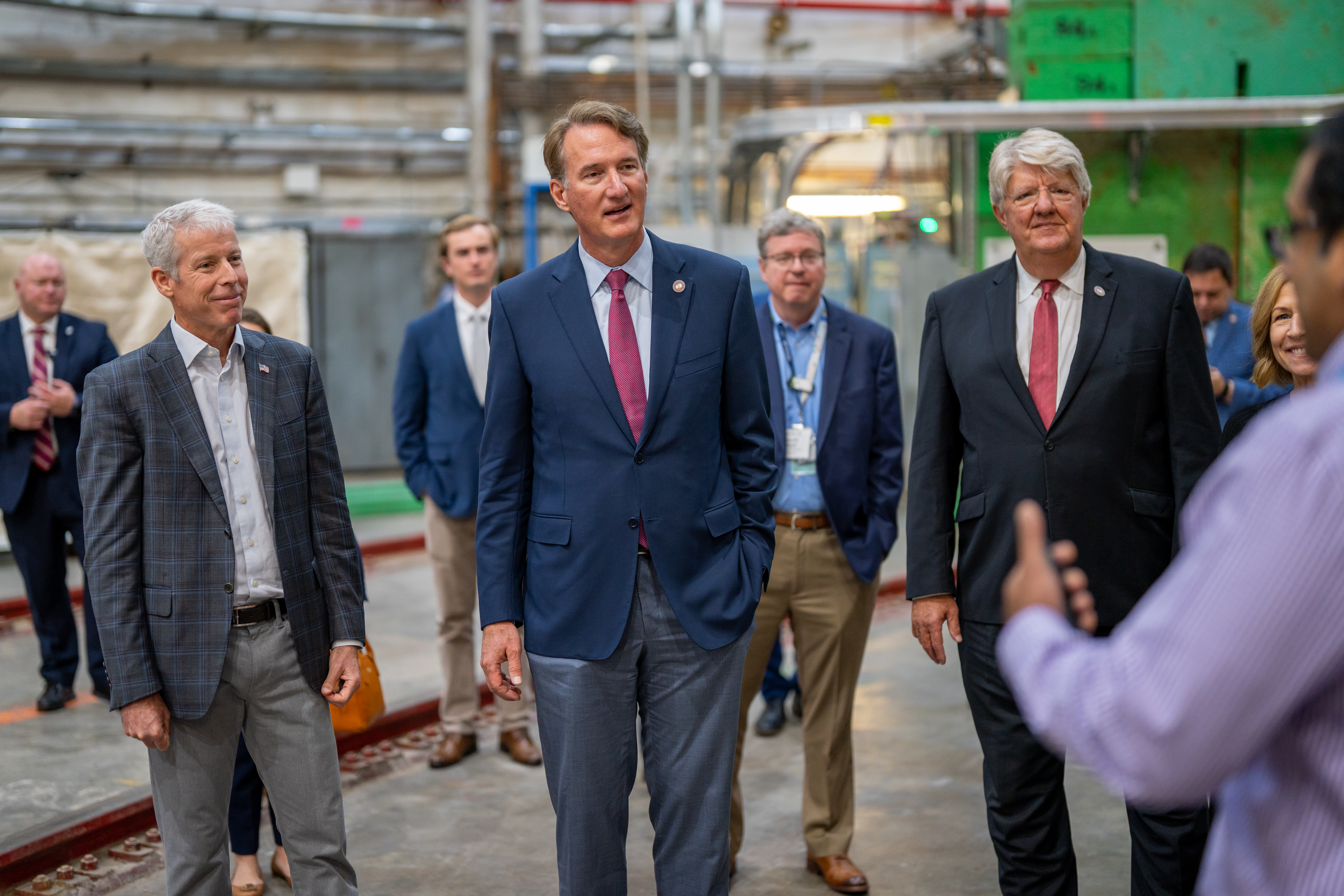
Youngkin with Trump's Department of Energy Secretary Chris Wright in 2025

After winning the election, Youngkin said that he would use an executive action to withdraw Virginia from the Regional Greenhouse Gas Initiative, a regional carbon cap-and-trade market. Youngkin has called the initiative a "carbon tax" and has stated that leaving the initiative would save ratepayers an average of about $50 a year. Democrats have countered that leaving the initiative would cut off a source of revenue for the state that raises hundreds of millions of dollars a year; this revenue is used for flood control and to provide low income ratepayers with energy assistance. On his first day in office, Youngkin signed an executive order calling for a reevaluation of Virginia's membership in the initiative. The Washington Post noted that because Virginia entered the initiative through legislative action, Youngkin may lack the legal authority to withdraw from the initiative without legislative approval. The publication theorized that this legal limitation may have been why Youngkin ultimately ordered a reevaluation of the initiative rather than a withdrawal. In August 2022, the Youngkin administration announced that, despite the likely legal challenges, it would attempt to withdraw Virginia from the initiative by the end of 2023 without seeking legislative approval to do so. Around that same time, Youngkin announced his desire to block a law set to take effect in 2024, which would require that Virginia follow California's vehicle emissions standards.

=== Marijuana ===
During his governorship, Youngkin had consistently opposed various efforts to liberalize recreational marijuana laws, but he signed a bill to ease the medical marijuana registration process.

A few months after his inauguration, Youngkin proposed that Virginia recriminalize possessing more than two ounces (57 g) of marijuana. When the Northam administration, a year earlier, had legalized possessing up to one ounce (28 g) of marijuana in Virginia, it did so while establishing a system in which possessing between one ounce (28 g) and one pound (450 g) was made punishable by a $25 fine; possessing over one pound remained a felony. This system made Virginia the only US state to have legalized marijuana possession without having misdemeanor penalties for possessing over the legal amount. Youngkin's proposal to introduce such penalties in Virginia was inspired by a recommendation made in 2021 by the state legislature's nonpartisan Joint Legislative Audit and Review Commission.

Under Youngkin's proposal, possessing more than two ounces of marijuana would become a Class 2 misdemeanor, while possessing more than six ounces (170 g) would become a Class 1 misdemeanor. Before this proposal was made, the Democratic-controlled State Senate had passed a bill during the 2022 legislative session that would have made possessing more than four ounces (110 g) of marijuana a Class 3 misdemeanor. That bill, which also would have legalized the sale of recreational marijuana in Virginia, was rejected by the Republican-controlled House of Delegates. Later that year, as part of a bipartisan budget deal signed by Youngkin, Virginia made possessing between four ounces (110 g) and one pound (450 g) of marijuana in public a Class 3 misdemeanor for a first time offense and a Class 2 misdemeanor for repeat offenses. This same budget deal banned the sale of cannabis products shaped as animals, humans, vehicles, or fruits, so as to protect against accidental consumption by children.

Separate marijuana legislation signed by Youngkin in 2022 allows patients to purchase medical marijuana immediately upon receiving a certificate to do so from a registered medical provider. Previously, patients were required to register with the State Board of Pharmacy before they could make such a purchase. This reform was enacted due to long wait times occurring during the registration process.

Youngkin had also proposed raising the legal age for purchasing CBD products in Virginia to 21 and banning products that contain Delta-8 THC, which is described by The Washington Post as "a hemp-derived compound that has become popular for its similarity to Delta-9, the main compound in marijuana that gives consumers a high.

In 2023, Youngkin signed a bill that bans the sale in Virginia of products containing more than 0.2 milligrams of THC or 0.3% total THC; the bill includes an exception for products containing 25 times more CBD than THC. This exception was made to preserve access to certain products with medical benefits.

In 2024, Youngkin vetoed legislation to permit commercial sales of marijuana.

=== Same-sex marriage ===
In March 2024, Youngkin signed a bill codifying same-sex marriage in Virginia law. In 2006, voters had amended the state's constitution to define marriage as heterosexual. That amendment was rendered void by the U.S. Supreme Court's 2015 ruling in Obergefell v. Hodges that same-sex marriage is protected by the Fourteenth Amendment to the Constitution. If Obergefell were to be overturned, however, the state constitution ban would automatically be resurrected, unless the ban is repealed by voters in accordance with a legislative bill scheduled for popular vote in November 2026.

=== Election procedure ===
As governor, Youngkin had touted his work restoring voting rights to former felons, an effort that began under Governor Bob McDonnell and then intensified under McDonnell's immediate successors, McAuliffe and Northam. Virginia is one of eleven states that does not automatically allow former felons to vote by the end of their sentences. An amendment to the state constitution that would have established automatic voting rights restoration for released felons in Virginia passed the legislature during Northam's final year in office, but amendments to the state constitution must be passed during two consecutive legislative sessions separated by an election before they can be voted on by the public in a referendum, and Republicans in the House of Delegates voted against the amendment during Youngkin's first year in office. In 2023, it was reported that Youngkin and his Secretary of the Commonwealth had quietly reversed course from their predecessors, reinstating procedural hurdles to the franchise restoration process and dramatically decreasing the number of ex-felons granted the franchise. The administration responded that reviewing applications on a case-by-case basis was in-line with the state constitution but did not specify the criteria being considered.

In 2022, Youngkin signed bipartisan legislation requiring that the removal of deceased voters from Virginia's electoral rolls be conducted on a weekly basis; this had previously been done on a monthly basis. That same year, Youngkin signed legislation changing how absentee ballots are reported in Virginia. Previously, these ballots had been reported as part of a single, at-large precinct. Youngkin's legislation required that they instead be reported precinct-by-precinct.

== Post-gubernatorial career ==
In July 2026, Youngkin joined Red Cell Partners, a venture studio based in Tysons, Virginia that builds companies in national security, cyber, and healthcare technology, as a partner, chairman, and board member, succeeding founder Grant Verstandig as chairman. Verstandig remained the firm's CEO.

== Personal life ==
Before taking office, Youngkin lived in Great Falls, Virginia, with his wife Suzanne and their four children.

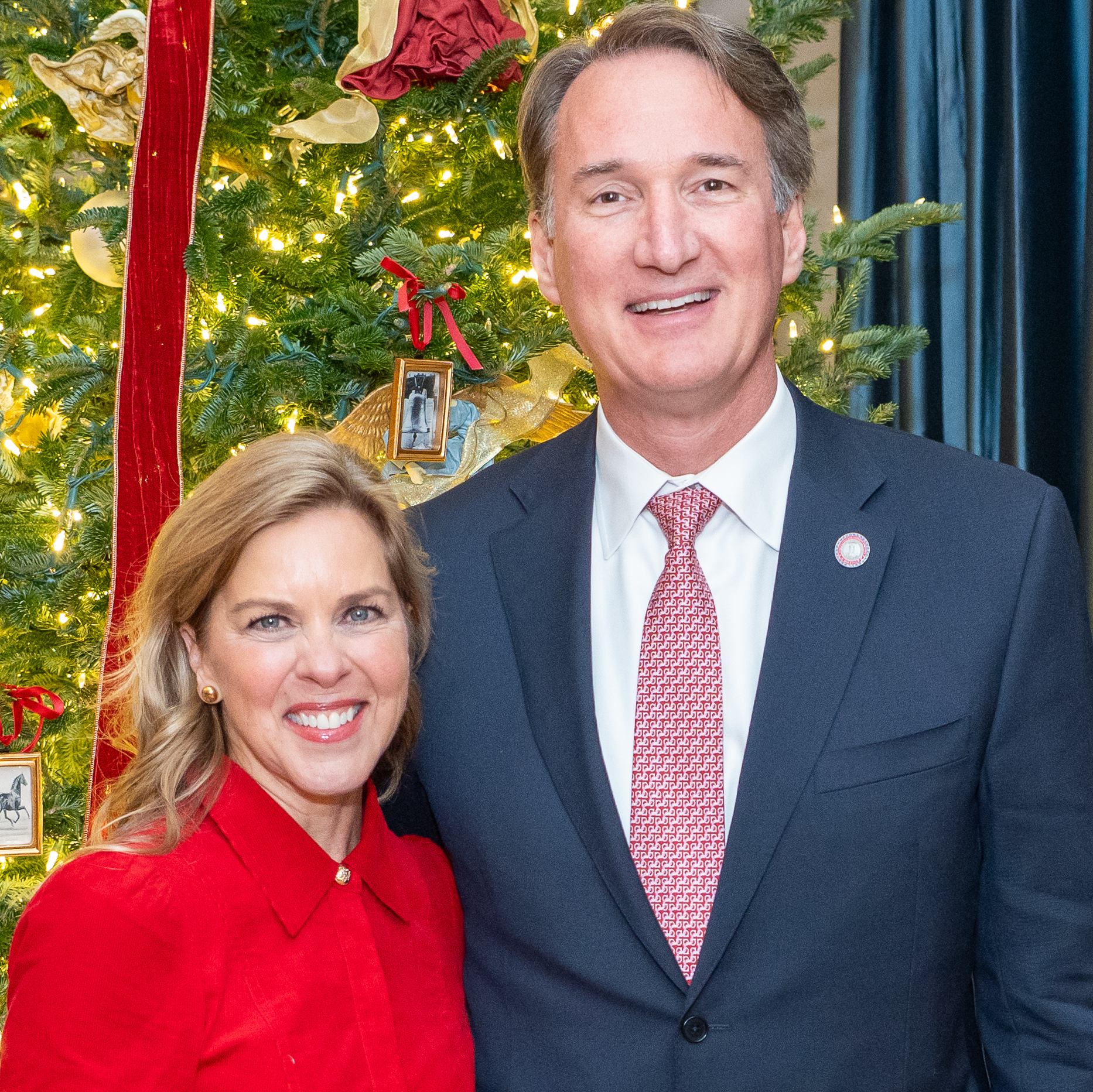
Youngkin with his wife, Suzanne (2025)

In 2020, Youngkin and his wife founded a nonprofit, Virginia Ready Initiative, focusing on connecting unemployed people in the state with job-training programs and potential employers.

As of September 2021, Youngkin had an estimated net worth of $440 million; he contributed $20 million of his own money to his race for governor. Although he said that he would release summaries of his tax returns before the election, he did not release them until after the election and has never released his actual tax returns. The summaries have not been independently verified. As governor, he placed some, but not all, of his financial holdings into a blind trust. The assets that he did not place into a blind trust include stock in several companies that operate in Virginia. Youngkin said that he would donate his entire gubernatorial salary, $175,000 a year, to charities. He donated his salary for the first quarter of 2022 to the Virginia Law Enforcement Assistance Program, an organization devoted to helping first responders who have experienced trauma, and he donated his salary for the second quarter of that year to the Virginia Veterans Services Foundation.

As a college basketball player, Youngkin's height was listed as 6 feet 7 inches; as of 2021, he gave his height as 6 feet 5 inches.

In early 2022, Youngkin received an honorary degree from the College of William and Mary. He also received an honorary Doctor of Humanities from Liberty University in May 2025.

Youngkin and his wife attended St. John's Episcopal Church in McLean, but departed during a time of fracturing in the denomination. In 2010, the couple helped found Holy Trinity Church, which met initially in their basement in McLean. Holy Trinity describes itself as a "non-denominational church with Anglican roots and a contemporary charismatic expression." The Youngkins set up a private foundation which owns the property where the church stands and a farm in Middleburg, Virginia, that serves as a Christian retreat. In 2026, Youngkin said that he and his wife would go on vacation to an undisclosed location after his tenure as governor ended.

Business positions
Preceded by David Rubenstein; William E. Conway Jr.	CEO of the Carlyle Group; 2018–2020	Succeeded by Harvey Schwartz
Party political offices
Preceded by Ed Gillespie	Republican nominee for Governor of Virginia; 2021	Succeeded by Winsome Earle-Sears
Political offices
Preceded by Ralph Northam	Governor of Virginia; 2022–2026	Succeeded by Abigail Spanberger
U.S. order of precedence (ceremonial)
Preceded by Ralph Northam as Former Governor	Order of precedence of the United States; Within Virginia	Succeeded by Jack Markell as Former Governor
Preceded by Ralph Northam as Former Governor	Order of precedence of the United States; Outside Virginia	Succeeded by George Pataki as Former Governor
