= Virginia Parole Board =

State parole board of Virginia

The Virginia Parole Board is the state parole board in Virginia. The Parole Board was established by the Virginia General Assembly in 1942. The Board has five members, appointed by the Governor of Virginia for a four-year term. The Board is currently chaired by Judge Patricia West.
