= Killing of Marcus-David Peters =

2018 fatal shooting of Marcus-David Peters

- Date: May 14, 2018
- Location: Richmond, Virginia, U.S.
- Type: Shooting
- Participants: Michael Nyantakyi
- Deaths: Marcus-David Peters

Marcus-David Peters was a Virginia man shot and killed by police officer Michael Nyantakyi while Peters, unarmed, was having a mental health crisis on May 14, 2018. Two prosecutors' reviews cleared Nyantakyi of wrongdoing. Peters' death was a focus of Virginia protests in 2020 during the George Floyd protests, and a community gathering place surrounding Richmond's Robert E. Lee Monument was marked with a sign for Peters. Later that year, the Virginia General Assembly passed a law named for Peters, intended to provide behavioral health experts to respond to people in mental health crises. These events prompted a 2021 third-party campaign for Governor by Peters' sister, Princess Blanding, who became an advocate for criminal justice reform following his death.

== Killing ==
In 2018, Marcus-David Peters was a 24-year-old Black man and Virginia Commonwealth University alumnus who taught high school biology at Essex High School, commuting from his home in Richmond, Virginia. On May 14, 2018, during a mental health crisis, Peters fled a car accident in Richmond, witnessed by police officer Michael Nyantakyi, a ten-year veteran of the Richmond Police Department, who then pursued Peters. Peters crashed his car by the on-ramp to Interstate 95 and got out of the car naked and distressed. He ran into a lane of traffic, was hit by a car, and then "thrashed and rolled on the shoulder of the travel lane." Peter got up and advanced towards Nyantakyi, shouting, "Back the fuck up. Put that taser down, and I'll kill you." In an encounter that lasted 18 seconds, Nyantakyi tasered Peters several times with no effect. Peters continued to verbally threaten the officer's life while charging at Nyantakyi, who then fatally shot Peters.

== Law enforcement review ==
Two reviews by local prosecutors cleared Nyantakyi of wrongdoing and no charges were brought. In 2018, Richmond's Commonwealth's Attorney Michael N. Herring reviewed the case, releasing footage of the fatal encounter, and declined to bring charges. Peters' family and other activists, who questioned why Peters was shot unarmed, called for this incident to be reviewed by Herring's successor, Colette McEachin, who took up the case in July 2020. In November 2020, she announced her findings, concurring with Herring that Nyantakyi's actions were reasonable. The decision was an issue in the 2021 Virginia gubernatorial election.

== Marcus-David Peters Circle ==
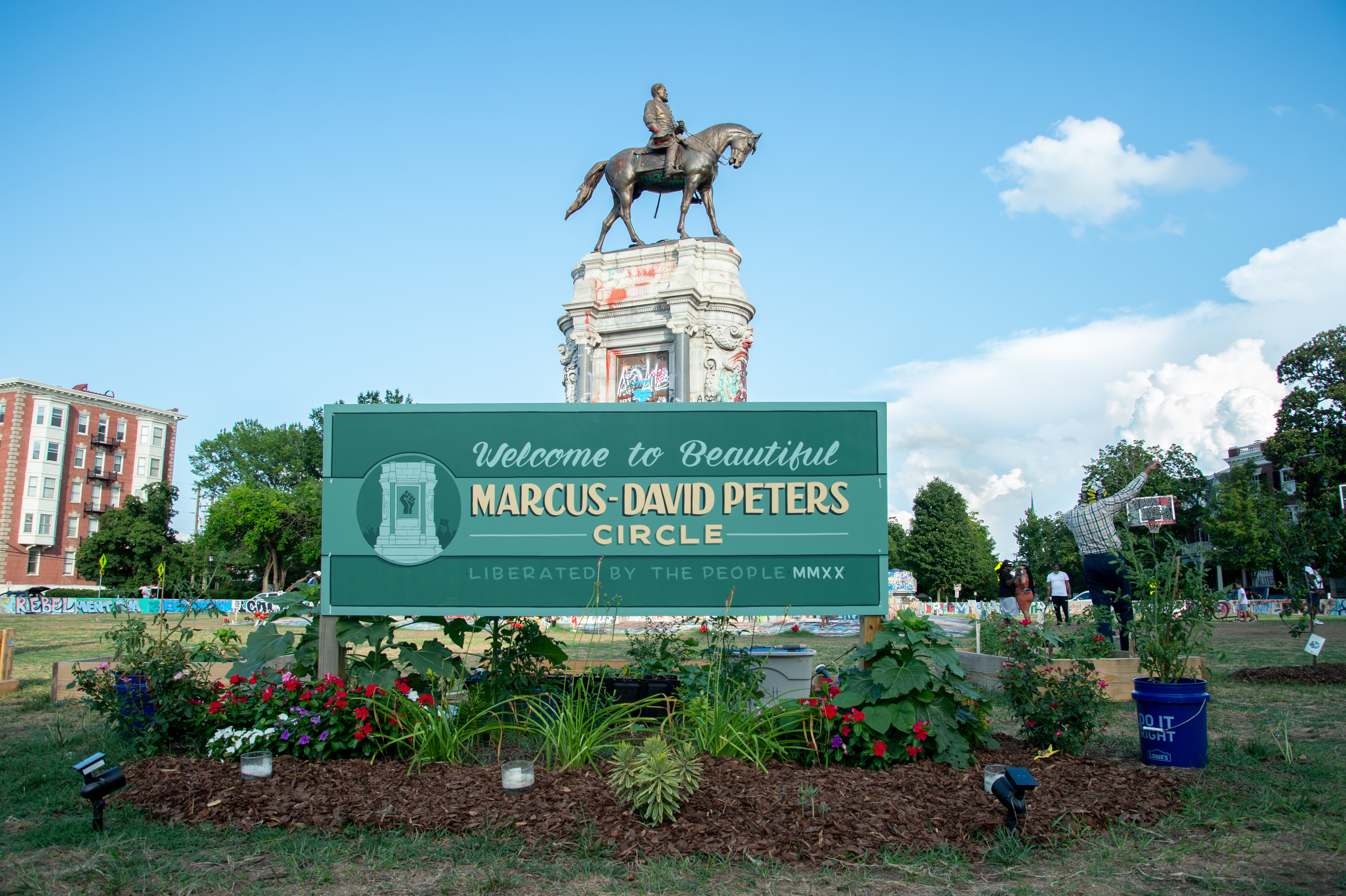
Marcus-David Peters Circle, August 2020

During the 2020 anti-racist police brutality protests, protesters in Richmond unofficially renamed the grassy area around Richmond's Robert E. Lee statue "Marcus-David Peters Circle". It became a regular site of protest and community gathering, with protest graffiti and messages projected in lights on the Lee statue; images of the protest art were featured on the cover of National Geographic. The area marked with a sign reading "Welcome to Beautiful Marcus-David Peters Circle, Liberated by the People MMXX". The eight-foot-long sign was cut down in an apparent act of vandalism in August, but was soon replaced and gatherings continued, including a celebration of Peters's birthday in October that drew hundreds. Organizers handed out plants and STEM technology kits to children in attendance in honor of Peter's work and as a symbol of commitment to the growth of the community.

In late June 2020, police announced a curfew and other restrictions on activity in the circle, but hundreds of protestors responded by gathering after dark and the curfew was not ultimately enforced.

On the weekend before the 2020 United States presidential election, a "Trump train" caravan of supporters of President Donald Trump resulted in an altercation with people in the circle, with witnesses reporting gunfire and chemical spray from the vehicles in the caravan.

== Marcus-David Peters Act ==
In the 2020 Virginia special legislative session on criminal justice reform and budgeting during the COVID-19 pandemic, House Bill 5043, titled the Mental health awareness response and community understanding services (Marcus) alert system, introduced by Delegate Jeff Bourne, initiated a program to encourage use of mental health professionals to respond to people in mental health crisis.

Peters's sister, Princess Blanding, worked with legislators and attended Governor Ralph Northam's ceremonial bill signing, but in her remarks at the ceremony she excoriated officials for the final bill that was considerably less robust than the initial proposal:

"Please take a moment to pat yourselves on the back for doing exactly what this racist, corrupt, and broken, may I also add, system expected you all to do: make the Marcus Alert bill a watered down, ineffective bill that will continue to ensure that having a mental health crisis results in a death sentence."

She particularly took issue with the discretion left to police, the years the bill allowed to implement the changes, and the potential for a patchwork system instead of a unified change across the state.

Blanding also criticized other bills from the session that were altered in the legislative process, including changes to a bill that limited newly created civilian review boards, as well as the failure of the General Assembly to repeal qualified immunity, calling on all elected officials involved to "fix it." In December 2020, Blanding announced a third-party campaign for Governor under the newly formed Liberation Party, criticizing Democrats for offering "crumbs".

== See also ==
- List of unarmed African Americans killed by law enforcement officers in the United States
- List of killings by law enforcement officers in the United States
- List of police reforms related to the George Floyd protests
