= Bethel, Virginia =

Bethel may refer to:

- Bethel, Clarke County, Virginia
- Bethel, Fauquier County, Virginia
- Bethel, Highland County, Virginia
- Bethel, Prince William County, Virginia
- Bethel, Warren County, Virginia
- Bethel, Washington County, Virginia
- Stringtown, Wythe County, Virginia (alternate name)
- West Bethel, Virginia in Amherst County
- Big Bethel, Virginia in Hampton
- Bethel Church, Virginia in Isle of Wight County
