= Sirons Mill, Virginia =

Unincorporated community in Virginia, United States

- Unincorporated community
- Location within Virginia Location within the United States
- Coordinates: 38°23′51″N 79°28′23″W
- Country: United States
- State: Virginia
- County: Highland
- Elevation: 2,454 ft (748 m)
- Time zone: UTC−5 (Eastern (EST))
  - Summer (DST): UTC−4 (EDT)
- ZIP code: 24458
- Area code: 540
- GNIS feature ID: 1493602

Sirons Mill is an unincorporated community in Highland County, Virginia, United States. Sirons Mill is located 5.9 miles (9.5 km) east of Monterey. The community is situated in the Bullpasture River Valley on Mill Run, a tributary of the Bullpasture River.
