= Back Creek (Jackson River tributary) =

- Location of the mouth of the Back Creek in Virginia

Location
- Country: United States
- State: Virginia
- County: Bath County, Highland County

Physical characteristics
- Source
  - location: Appalachian Mountains, Highland County, Virginia
  - coordinates: 38°28′58″N 79°38′27″W
  - elevation: 3,700 ft (1,100 m)
- Mouth: Jackson River
  - location: Near Bacova Junction, Bath County, Virginia
  - coordinates: 38°01′42″N 79°54′01″W
  - elevation: 1,600 ft (490 m)

Back Creek is a 41.3-mile-long (66.5 km) river in the United States United States state of Virginia. It is a tributary of the Jackson River, part of the James River watershed.

== See also ==
- List of rivers of Virginia

== Sources ==
- USGS Hydrologic Unit Map - State of Virginia (1974)
- Salmon, Emily J.; Edward D. C. Campbell, Jr. (1994). The Hornbook of Virginia History (4th ed.). Richmond, VA: Virginia Office of Graphic Communications. ISBN 0-88490-177-7.
