= Hightown, Virginia =

Unincorporated community in Virginia, United States

- Unincorporated community
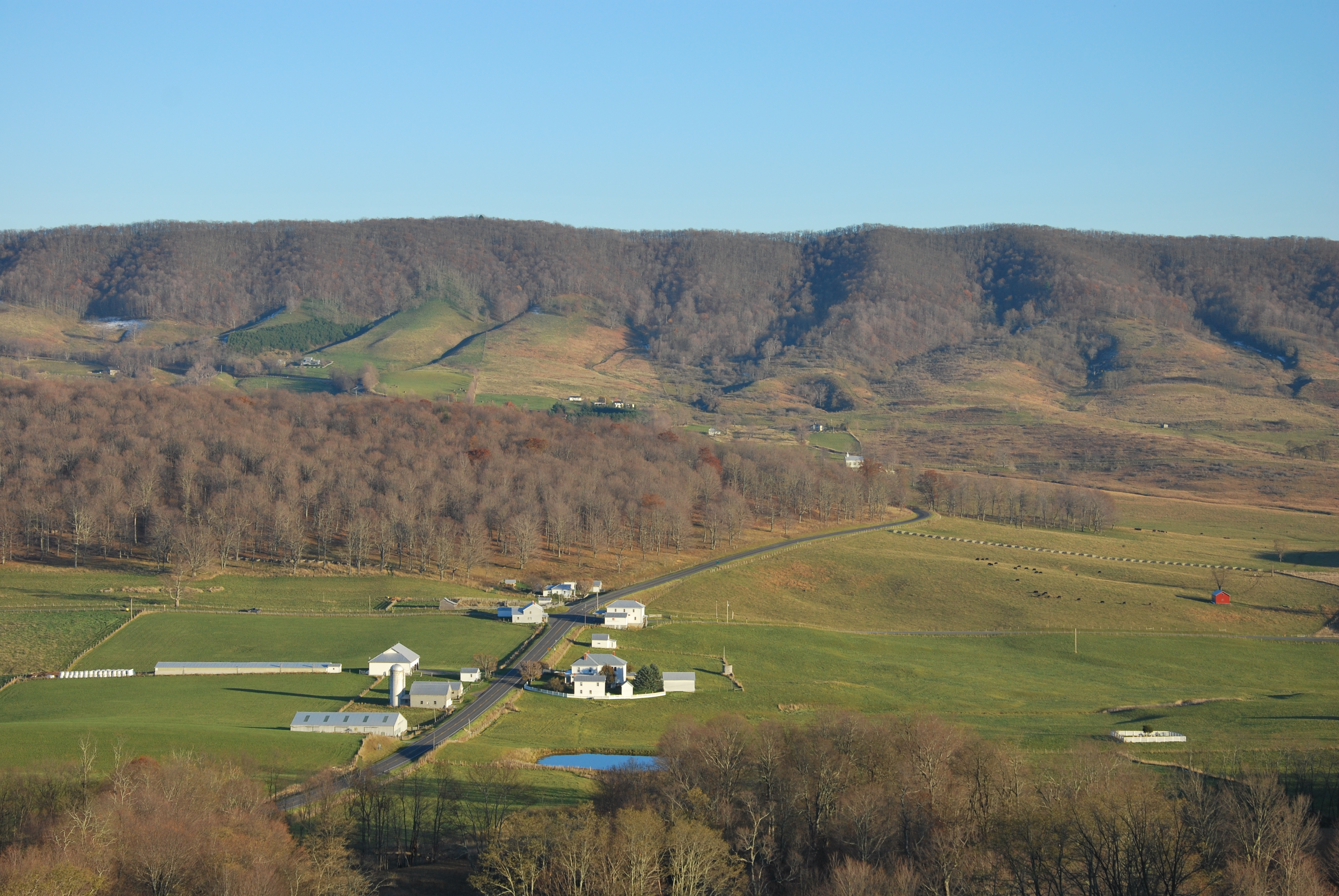
- Hightown, looking east from Lantz Mountain

- Location within Virginia Location within the United States
- Coordinates: 38°25′52″N 79°37′54″W
- Country: United States
- State: Virginia
- County: Highland
- Elevation: 3,123 ft (952 m)
- Time zone: UTC−5 (Eastern (EST))
  - Summer (DST): UTC−4 (EDT)
- ZIP codes: 24465
- Area code: 540
- GNIS feature ID: 1495691

Hightown is an unincorporated community at the crossroads of U.S. Route 250 and Secondary State Route 640 in Highland County, Virginia, United States. Hightown is located approximately 3 miles (4.8 km) northwest of Monterey. The community lies on the division of the James River and Potomac River watersheds, with the main source of the South Branch Potomac River to the north of Hightown along State Route 640 and the source of the Jackson River, a tributary of the James, south of U.S. Route 250 west of Hightown. The roof of a barn owned by Jacob Hevener located near Hightown is said to have divided the two watersheds, with rain falling on one side of the roof flowing to the James and on the other to the Potomac. The community was originally known as Heveners Store.
