= Clover Creek =

Clover Creek or Clovercreek may refer to:

- Clover Creek (Bruneau River tributary), a stream in Owyhee County, Idaho
- Clover Creek (Pennsylvania), a tributary of the Frankstown Branch Juniata River
- Fredericksburg, Blair County, Pennsylvania, also known as Clover Creek, a town on the above stream
- Clover Creek, Virginia, an unincorporated community
- Clover Creek, Washington, an unincorporated community
- Clover Creek (Washington), a creek in Pierce County
