= Liberty, Highland County, Virginia =

Unincorporated community in Virginia, United States

- Unincorporated community
- Location within Virginia Location within the United States
- Coordinates: 38°17′20″N 79°27′34″W
- Country: United States
- State: Virginia
- County: Highland
- Elevation: 1,883 ft (574 m)
- Time zone: UTC-5 (Eastern (EST))
  - Summer (DST): UTC-4 (EDT)
- ZIP code: 24487
- Area code: 540
- GNIS feature ID: 1495838

Liberty is an unincorporated community in Highland County, Virginia, United States. Liberty is located 10.7 miles (17.2 km) southeast of Monterey. The community is located in the Cowpasture River valley at the confluence of the Cowpasture River and Shaws Fork.
