= Possum Trot, Virginia =

Unincorporated community in Virginia, United States

- Unincorporated community
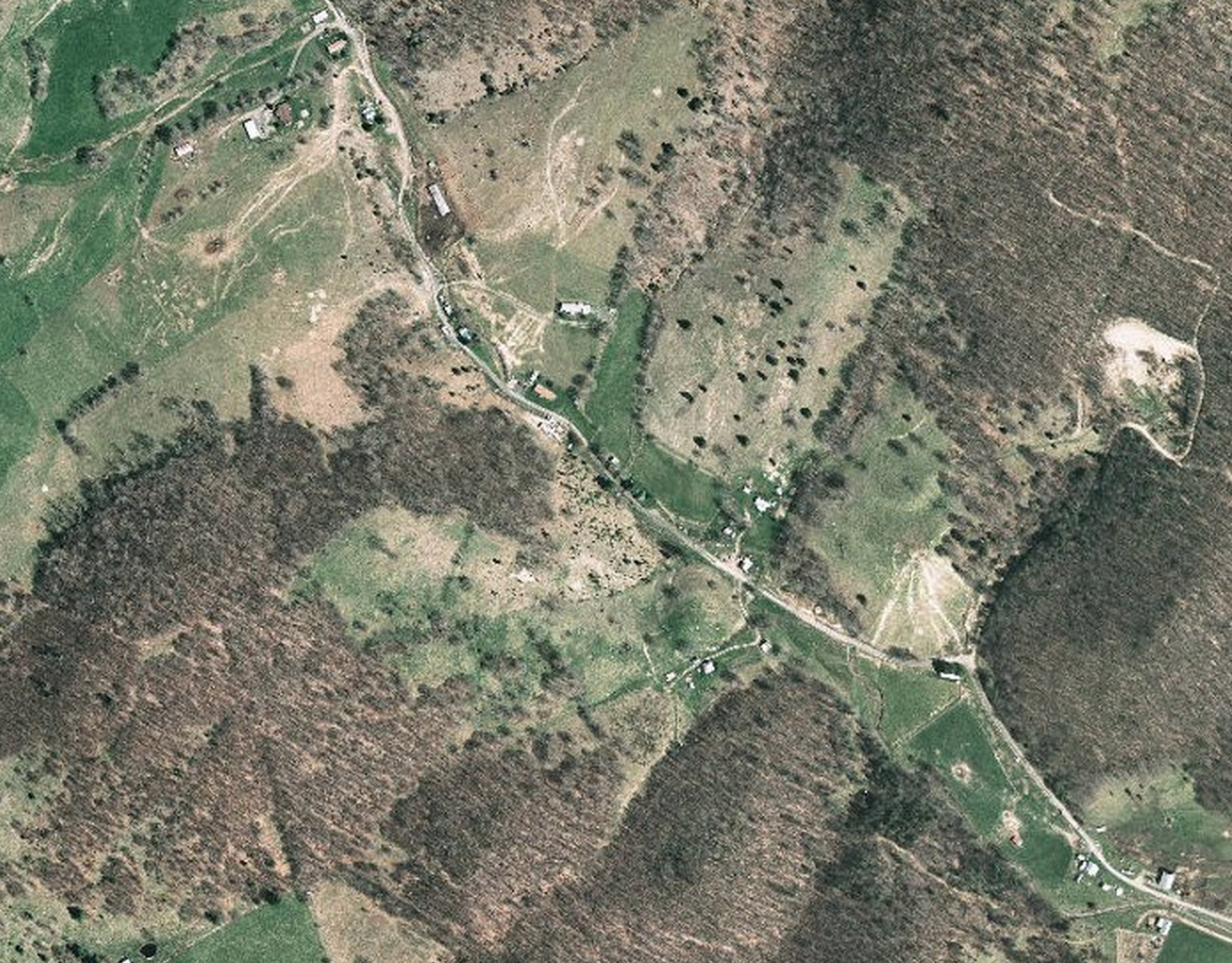
- Aerial view of Possum Trot, Virginia

- Location within Virginia Location within the United States
- Coordinates: 38°28′12″N 79°31′56″W
- Country: United States
- State: Virginia
- County: Highland
- Elevation: 2,520 ft (770 m)
- Time zone: UTC-5 (Eastern (EST))
  - Summer (DST): UTC-4 (EDT)
- ZIP code: 24465
- Area code: 540
- GNIS feature ID: 1496110

Possum Trot is an unincorporated community in Highland County, Virginia, United States. The community is located 4.7 miles (7.6 km) northeast of Monterey and 2.1 miles (3.4 km) southeast of Blue Grass on State Route 635. Possum Trot is cradled by the long ridge line of Monterey Mountain to the west and Ginseng Mountain to the north.
