= Patna, Virginia =

Unincorporated community in Virginia, United States

- Unincorporated community
- Location within Virginia Location within the United States
- Coordinates: 38°14′01″N 79°31′26″W
- Country: United States
- State: Virginia
- County: Highland
- Elevation: 1,703 ft (519 m)
- Time zone: UTC-5 (Eastern (EST))
  - Summer (DST): UTC-4 (EDT)
- ZIP code: 24487
- Area code: 540
- GNIS feature ID: 1499846

Patna is an unincorporated community in Highland County, Virginia, United States. Patna is located 12.6 miles (20.3 km) south-southeast of Monterey on State Route 614. The community is situated along the Cowpasture River in the southern section of the Cowpasture Valley of Highland County.
