= Mustoe, Highland County, Virginia =

Unincorporated community in Virginia, United States

Mustoe, Virginia
- Unincorporated community
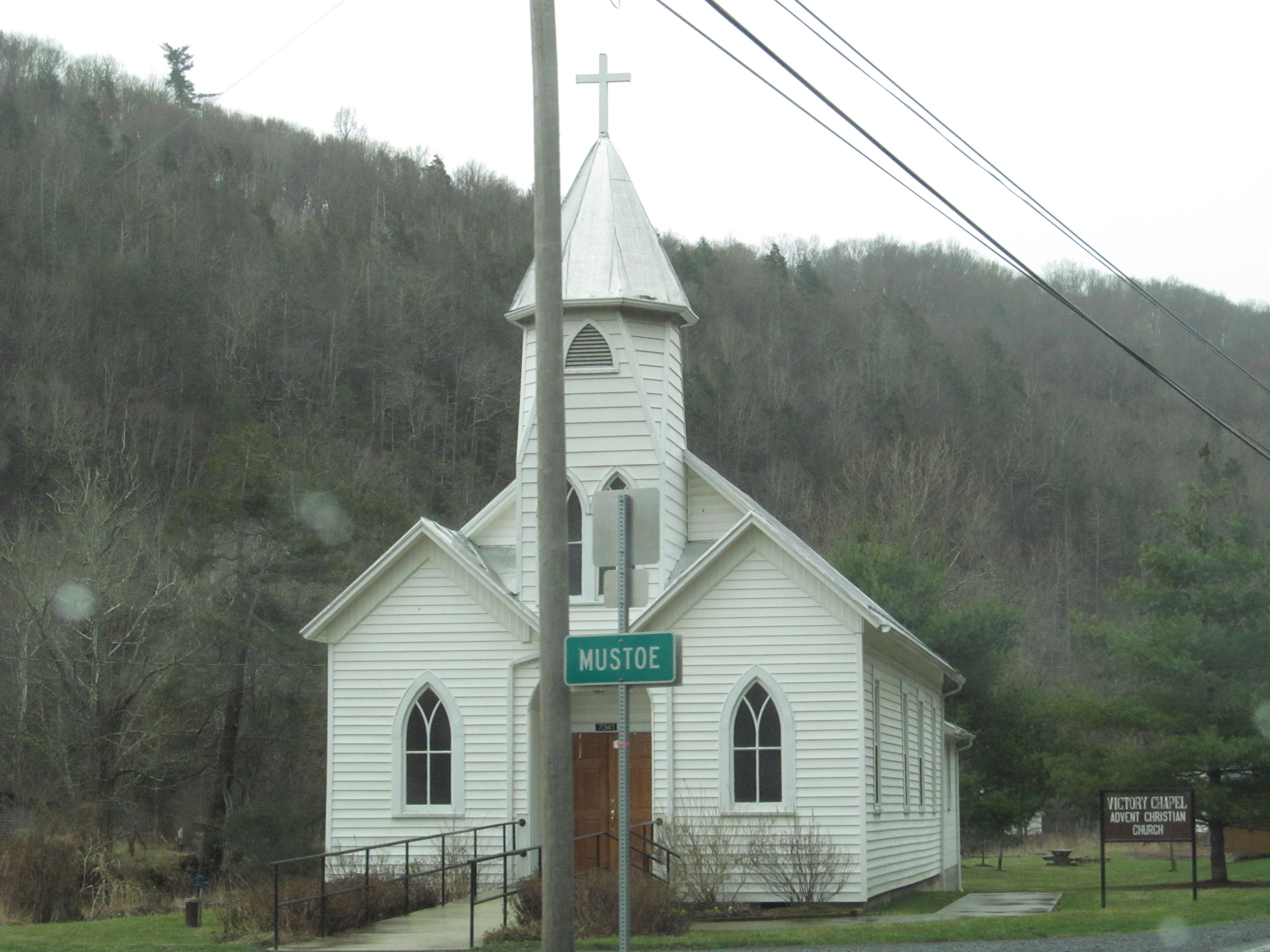
- Mustoe in April 2014

- Location within Virginia Location within the United States
- Coordinates: 38°19′25″N 79°38′25″W
- Country: United States
- State: Virginia
- County: Highland
- Elevation: 2,382 ft (726 m)
- Time zone: UTC-5 (Eastern (EST))
  - Summer (DST): UTC-4 (EDT)
- ZIP code: 24465
- Area code: 540
- GNIS feature ID: 1497033

Mustoe (also Pinckney) is an unincorporated community in Highland County, Virginia, United States. Mustoe is located 6.9 miles (11.1 km) south-southwest of Monterey. The community is situated along U.S. Route 220 on the banks of the Jackson River. According to the National Weather Service, the only tornado on record in Highland County occurred near Mustoe in 1959.
