= Trimble, Virginia =

Unincorporated community in Virginia, United States

- Unincorporated community
- Location within Virginia Location within the United States
- Coordinates: 38°18′16″N 79°37′08″W
- Country: United States
- State: Virginia
- County: Highland
- Elevation: 2,549 ft (777 m)
- Time zone: UTC−5 (Eastern (EST))
  - Summer (DST): UTC−4 (EDT)
- ZIP code: 24484
- Area code: 540
- GNIS feature ID: 1496325

Trimble is an unincorporated community in Highland County, Virginia, United States. Trimble is located 7.7 miles (12.4 km) south of Monterey. The community is situated along the Dry Branch, a tributary of the Jackson River, near a gap in Little Mountain through which the Dry Branch flows.
