= Devils Backbone (Highland County, Virginia) =

Mountain in Highland County, Virginia, US

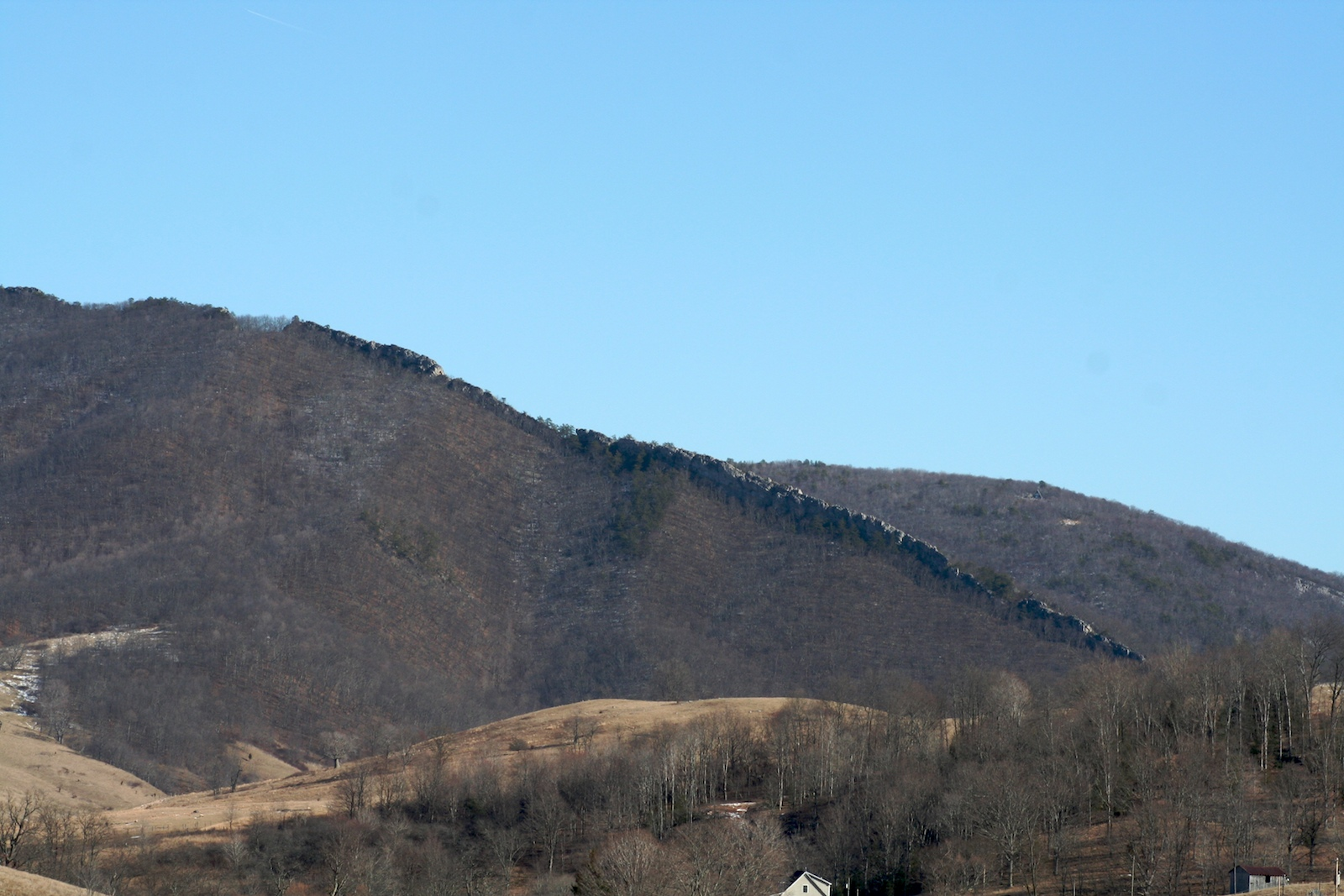
- Devils Backbone in 2009

Highest point
- Elevation: 3,829 ft (1,167 m)
- Coordinates: 38°30′50″N 79°31′34″W

Geography
- Location within Virginia
- Location: Blue Grass, Highland County, Virginia, United States
- Parent range: Ridge-and-valley Appalachians
- Topo map(s): USGS Snowy Mountain, Monterey

Devils Backbone (also Devil's Backbone) is a ridge and rock outcrop located in Highland County, Virginia, United States. The ridge is located approximately 7.6 miles (12.2 km) north-northeast of Monterey, Virginia near the village of Blue Grass.

Along the crest of the ridge line is a near vertical outcrop of Tuscarora Sandstone approximately 84 feet (26 m) thick. This formation gives the ridge its name of Devils Backbone, as the outcrop has been described "like the vertebrae of some monstrous prehistoric animal". The formation has also been described as resembling that of "the comb on the head of a domestic fowl".
