= Meadowdale, Virginia =

Unincorporated community in Virginia, United States

- Unincorporated community
- Location within Virginia Location within the United States
- Coordinates: 38°22′34″N 79°39′54″W
- Country: United States
- State: Virginia
- County: Highland
- Elevation: 2,805 ft (855 m)
- Time zone: UTC-5 (Eastern (EST))
  - Summer (DST): UTC-4 (EDT)
- ZIP code: 24465
- Area code: 540
- GNIS feature ID: 1495926

Meadowdale is an unincorporated community in Highland County, Virginia, United States. Meadowdale is located 5.2 miles (8.4 km) southwest of Monterey on State Route 84.
