= Head Waters, Virginia =

Unincorporated community in Virginia, United States

- Unincorporated community
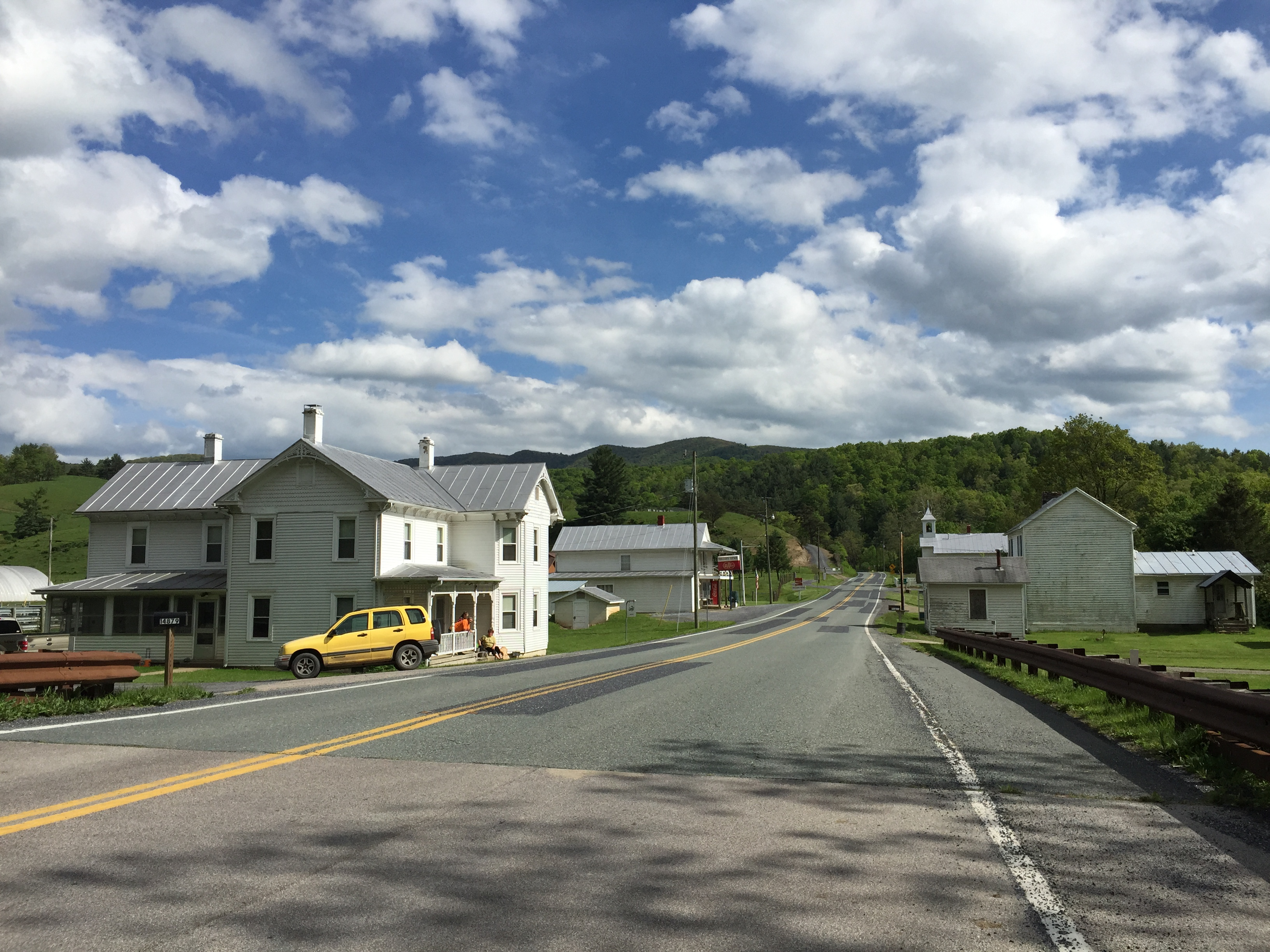
- A view of Head Waters, VA eastbound on U.S. 250

- Location within Virginia Location within the United States
- Coordinates: 38°19′33″N 79°24′46″W
- Country: United States
- State: Virginia
- County: Highland
- Elevation: 2,047 ft (624 m)
- Time zone: UTC−5 (Eastern (EST))
  - Summer (DST): UTC−4 (EDT)
- ZIP codes: 24442
- GNIS feature ID: 1484004

Head Waters (also Headwaters) is an unincorporated community in Highland County, Virginia, United States. Head Waters is located approximately 4.25 miles (6.84 km) east of McDowell on US 250. The South Fork South Branch Potomac River rises north of Head Waters, hence the community's name. Head Waters has a post office with ZIP code 24442.
