= Bullpasture River =

River in Virginia, United States

Coordinates: 38°11′22″N 79°33′49″W

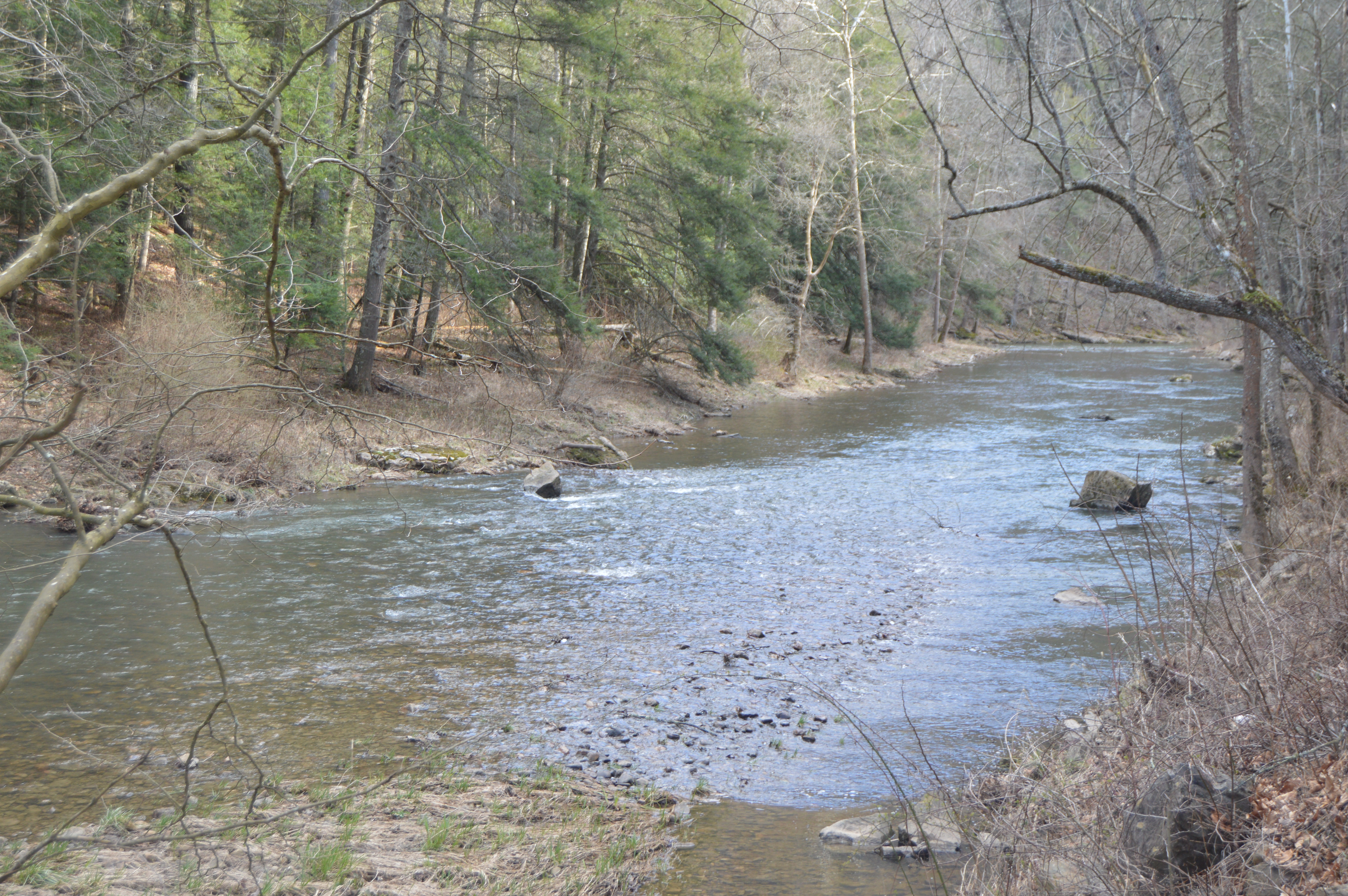
- Just north of Williamsville

Physical characteristics
- Mouth: Cowpasture River
- Length: 26.2 miles

The Bullpasture River is a 26.2-mile-long (42.2 km) tributary of the Cowpasture River of Virginia in the United States.

The Bullpasture River flows through Highland County, Virginia, from its headwaters on the boundary between Virginia and West Virginia northwest of the village of Doe Hill, Virginia. It flows southwest between Bullpasture Mountain and Jack Mountain until joining the Cowpasture River in Bath County, Virginia, below the hamlet of Williamsville.

The Cowpasture River joins the Jackson River to form the James River.

== See also ==
- List of Virginia rivers
