= Clover Creek, Virginia =

Unincorporated community in Virginia, United States

- Unincorporated community
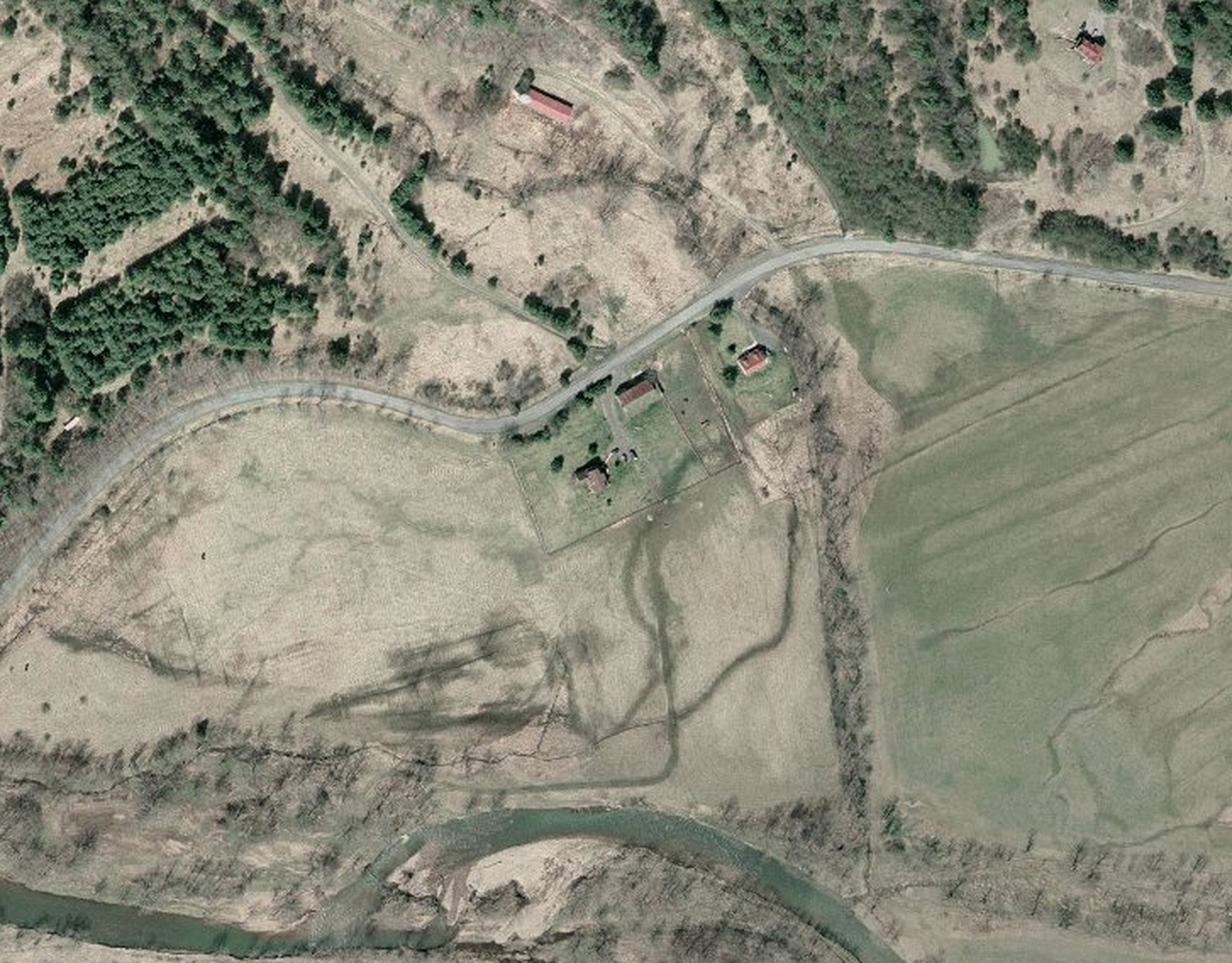
- Aerial view of Clover Creek, Virginia

- Location within Virginia Location within the United States
- Coordinates: 38°16′12″N 79°32′56″W
- Country: United States
- State: Virginia
- County: Highland
- Elevation: 1,870 ft (570 m)
- Time zone: UTC-5 (Eastern (EST))
  - Summer (DST): UTC-4 (EDT)
- ZIP code: 24458
- Area code: 540
- GNIS feature ID: 1495400

Clover Creek (formerly Clovercreek or McClungs Mill) is an unincorporated community in Highland County, Virginia, United States. Clover Creek is located 10 miles (16 km) south-southeast of Monterey on State Route 678. The community is situated in the Bullpasture Valley along the path of the Bullpasture River. Beginning in 1897 with a decision by the United States Board on Geographic Names, the community was officially referred to as the single-word "Clovercreek"; however, in 1970, the board modified the community's name to the current two-word "Clover Creek". During the French and Indian War, a British fort named Fort George was built near Clover Creek in 1754 consisting of a wooden stockade 90 feet (27 m) square. The fort was never directly attacked, though arrows were at one point launched against the fort from a distance leaving no damage. George Washington may have visited the fort while traveling in the area, marking the only time Washington visited the region which is now known as Highland County.

The McClung Farm Historic District, which includes the Clover Creek Presbyterian Church, is listed on the National Register of Historic Places.
