= Bolar, Virginia =

Unincorporated community in Virginia, United States

- Unincorporated community
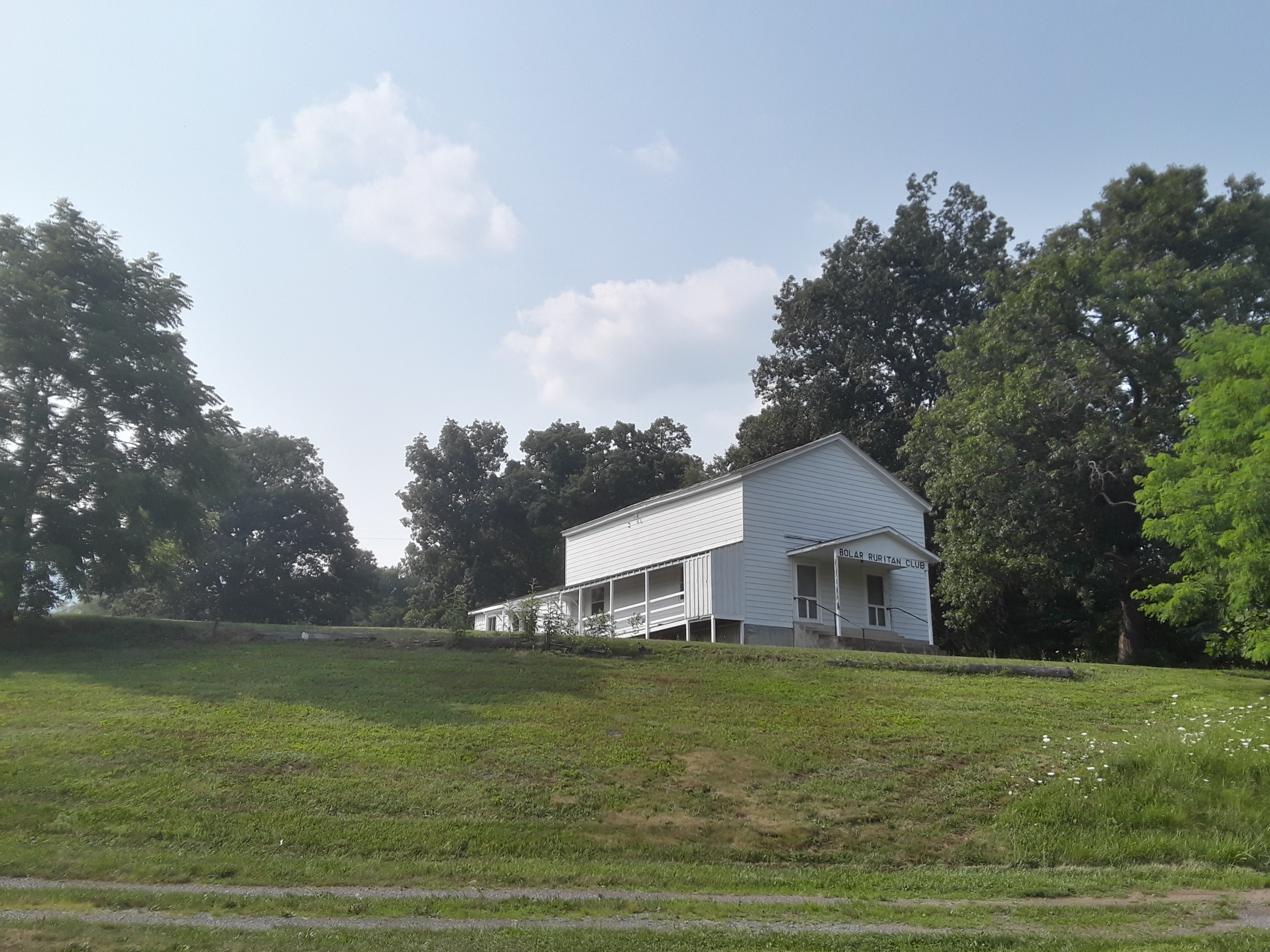
- Bolar Ruritan Club in 2021

- Location within Virginia Location within the United States
- Coordinates: 38°13′02″N 79°40′35″W
- Country: United States
- State: Virginia
- Counties: Bath, Highland
- Elevation: 2,238 ft (682 m)
- Time zone: UTC-5 (Eastern (EST))
  - Summer (DST): UTC-4 (EDT)
- GNIS feature ID: 1492604

Bolar is an unincorporated community in Bath and Highland counties, Virginia, United States. The community is located approximately 14.5 miles (23.3 km) southwest of Monterey and 13.4 miles (21.6 km) northeast of Warm Springs. Bolar is situated along Bolar Run on Big Valley Road, which roughly follows the county line through the community.
