= 1904 United States presidential election in Virginia =

- November 8, 1904
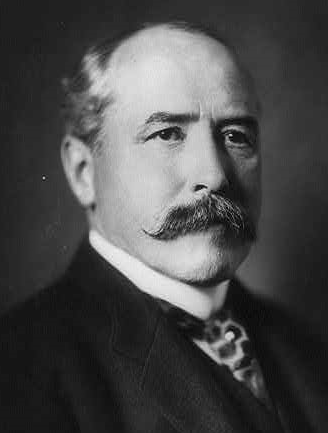

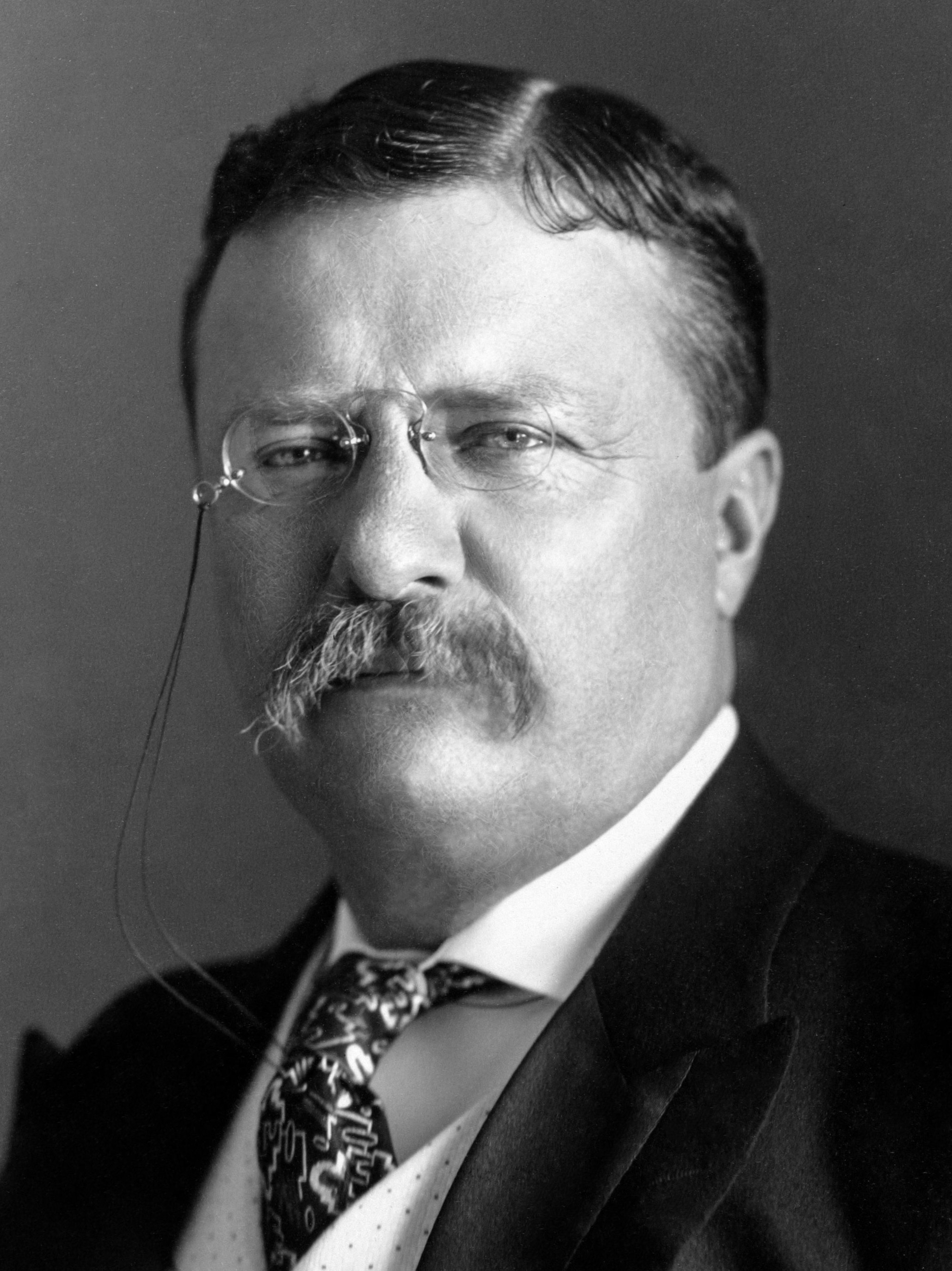
Nominee	Alton B. Parker	Theodore Roosevelt
Party	Democratic	Republican
Home state	New York	New York
Running mate	Henry G. Davis	Charles W. Fairbanks
Electoral vote	12	0
Popular vote	80,649	48,180
Percentage	61.84%	36.95%
County and independent city results
Parker
50–60%
60–70%
70–80%
80–90%
Roosevelt
50–60%
60–70%
President before election
Theodore Roosevelt
Republican
Elected President
Theodore Roosevelt
Republican

The 1904 United States presidential election in Virginia took place on November 8, 1904, as part of the 1904 United States presidential election. Voters chose 12 representatives, or electors to the Electoral College, who voted for president and vice president.

Following the state's delayed readmission to the Union, Virginia was unique among ex-Confederate states in not having a period of Republican control during Reconstruction, due to the failure of the Underwood Constitution to pass in 1868 and the consequent support for the Conservative Party that fused prewar Democrats and Whigs in the first postwar elections and consistently controlled the state legislature after readmission. From 1879, however, a fusion with the “Readjuster” faction of the state Democratic Party would revitalize the Republicans until 1883, although the state GOP would remain competitive in statewide elections, only narrowly failing to carry the state in 1888, until the Cleveland Administration eliminated federal oversight while the Walton Act created the secret ballot and began large-scale black disenfranchisement.

However, despite its dominant position, the Democratic Party was deeply divided between the conservative Gold Democrats of a state whose economy was already substantially influenced by the rapidly industrializing Northeast, and a Populist-influenced faction centered in the state's rural areas. Northern and Southwest Virginia were supportive of the Republican policies of the gold standard and high tariffs, and trended towards William McKinley in 1896 and 1900 — ultimately becoming the mainstay of a “lily-white” Jim Crow state Republican Party for the ensuing half-century, allowing the party to remain more viable than in any other ex-Confederate state except North Carolina and Tennessee where extremely loyal Unionist Republicanism remained.

Following the 1900 election, a new constitution was drafted with a cumulative poll tax and literacy tests that served to reduce voter turnout dramatically. The new constitution was supposedly a response to persistent electoral fraud, common in the Black Belt as it was in other Southern states. After much debate over how rigidly to disenfranchise black voters, alongside the question of whether poor whites should be disenfranchised, the ultimately produced Constitution featured some of the most stringent poll tax and literacy requirements in the former Confederacy. These stringent suffrage requirements would mean Virginia's 1900 turnout would not be equaled until 1952, by which time the state's population had almost doubled. (Note: This takes into account the fact that the Nineteenth Amendment had doubled the electorate by enfranchising women.)

From the earliest polls, it was clear that Democratic candidate, Chief Judge of the New York Court of Appeals Alton B. Parker was always going to carry Virginia. Neither candidate campaigned in the state during the fall. Virginia ultimately voted for Parker over the Republican candidate, incumbent President Theodore Roosevelt. Parker won the state by a margin of 24.90 percentage points.

== Results ==
1904 United States presidential election in Virginia
Party	Candidate	Votes	Percentage	Electoral votes
Democratic	Alton B. Parker	80,649	61.84%	12
Republican	Theodore Roosevelt (inc.)	48,180	36.95%	0
Prohibition	Silas C. Swallow	1,379	1.06%	0
Socialist	Eugene V. Debs	202	0.15%	0
Totals		130,410	100.0%	12

=== Results by county ===
1904 United States presidential election in Virginia by counties and independent cities
County or Independent City	Alton B. Parker Democratic		Theodore Roosevelt Republican		Silas C. Swallow Prohibition		Eugene V. Debs Socialist		Margin		Total votes cast
County or Independent City	#	%	#	%	#	%	#	%	#	%	Total votes cast
Accomack County	1,517	82.67%	256	13.95%	62	3.38%	0	0.00%	1,261	68.72%	1,835
Albemarle County	1,069	76.74%	309	22.18%	15	1.08%	0	0.00%	760	54.56%	1,393
Alexandria County	157	61.09%	99	38.52%	1	0.39%	0	0.00%	58	22.57%	257
Alleghany County	782	52.52%	665	44.66%	42	2.82%	0	0.00%	117	7.86%	1,489
Amelia County	320	77.11%	76	18.31%	19	4.58%	0	0.00%	244	58.80%	415
Amherst County	878	82.91%	177	16.71%	4	0.38%	0	0.00%	701	66.19%	1,059
Appomattox County	684	87.80%	93	11.94%	2	0.26%	0	0.00%	591	75.87%	779
Augusta County	1,582	57.57%	1,096	39.88%	70	2.55%	0	0.00%	486	17.69%	2,748
Bath County	325	57.12%	239	42.00%	4	0.70%	1	0.18%	86	15.11%	569
Bedford County	1,301	66.82%	560	28.76%	86	4.42%	0	0.00%	741	38.06%	1,947
Bland County	339	45.02%	407	54.05%	7	0.93%	0	0.00%	-68	-9.03%	753
Botetourt County	818	54.14%	664	43.94%	29	1.92%	0	0.00%	154	10.19%	1,511
Brunswick County	593	79.49%	149	19.97%	4	0.54%	0	0.00%	444	59.52%	746
Buchanan County	307	35.37%	561	64.63%	0	0.00%	0	0.00%	-254	-29.26%	868
Buckingham County	595	59.03%	405	40.18%	8	0.79%	0	0.00%	190	18.85%	1,008
Campbell County	674	79.20%	158	18.57%	14	1.65%	5	0.59%	516	60.63%	851
Caroline County	501	60.65%	317	38.38%	8	0.97%	0	0.00%	184	22.28%	826
Carroll County	874	40.78%	1,265	59.03%	4	0.19%	0	0.00%	-391	-18.25%	2,143
Charles City County	129	62.02%	78	37.50%	1	0.48%	0	0.00%	51	24.52%	208
Charlotte County	517	69.96%	210	28.42%	12	1.62%	0	0.00%	307	41.54%	739
Chesterfield County	597	78.04%	151	19.74%	16	2.09%	1	0.13%	446	58.30%	765
Clarke County	444	82.99%	67	12.52%	23	4.30%	1	0.19%	377	70.47%	535
Craig County	335	65.30%	161	31.38%	17	3.31%	0	0.00%	174	33.92%	513
Culpeper County	798	79.01%	209	20.69%	3	0.30%	0	0.00%	589	58.32%	1,010
Cumberland County	334	85.42%	51	13.04%	6	1.53%	0	0.00%	283	72.38%	391
Dickenson County	577	45.61%	684	54.07%	4	0.32%	0	0.00%	-107	-8.46%	1,265
Dinwiddie County	406	77.04%	119	22.58%	2	0.38%	0	0.00%	287	54.46%	527
Elizabeth City County	600	73.35%	211	25.79%	7	0.86%	0	0.00%	389	47.56%	818
Essex County	430	45.55%	513	54.34%	0	0.00%	1	0.11%	-83	-8.79%	944
Fairfax County	774	63.91%	422	34.85%	12	0.99%	3	0.25%	352	29.07%	1,211
Fauquier County	1,216	77.16%	357	22.65%	3	0.19%	0	0.00%	859	54.51%	1,576
Floyd County	450	30.57%	1,012	68.75%	9	0.61%	1	0.07%	-562	-38.18%	1,472
Fluvanna County	394	74.34%	135	25.47%	1	0.19%	0	0.00%	259	48.87%	530
Franklin County	1,166	56.03%	874	42.00%	41	1.97%	0	0.00%	292	14.03%	2,081
Frederick County	858	71.38%	316	26.29%	28	2.33%	0	0.00%	542	45.09%	1,202
Giles County	721	53.73%	588	43.82%	33	2.46%	0	0.00%	133	9.91%	1,342
Gloucester County	474	72.37%	173	26.41%	6	0.92%	2	0.31%	301	45.95%	655
Goochland County	298	52.19%	273	47.81%	0	0.00%	0	0.00%	25	4.38%	571
Grayson County	867	45.04%	1,054	54.75%	4	0.21%	0	0.00%	-187	-9.71%	1,925
Greene County	214	40.61%	311	59.01%	2	0.38%	0	0.00%	-97	-18.41%	527
Greensville County	356	77.56%	100	21.79%	3	0.65%	0	0.00%	256	55.77%	459
Halifax County	1,198	65.75%	594	32.60%	30	1.65%	0	0.00%	604	33.15%	1,822
Hanover County	527	66.04%	261	32.71%	10	1.25%	0	0.00%	266	33.33%	798
Henrico County	890	76.26%	248	21.25%	16	1.37%	13	1.11%	642	55.01%	1,167
Henry County	718	62.22%	422	36.57%	14	1.21%	0	0.00%	296	25.65%	1,154
Highland County	304	45.58%	352	52.77%	11	1.65%	0	0.00%	-48	-7.20%	667
Isle of Wight County	584	77.45%	168	22.28%	2	0.27%	0	0.00%	416	55.17%	754
James City County	98	71.01%	34	24.64%	6	4.35%	0	0.00%	64	46.38%	138
King and Queen County	390	74.43%	134	25.57%	0	0.00%	0	0.00%	256	48.85%	524
King George County	279	59.49%	188	40.09%	2	0.43%	0	0.00%	91	19.40%	469
King William County	304	60.44%	195	38.77%	4	0.80%	0	0.00%	109	21.67%	503
Lancaster County	350	77.78%	93	20.67%	7	1.56%	0	0.00%	257	57.11%	450
Lee County	780	36.81%	1,329	62.72%	10	0.47%	0	0.00%	-549	-25.91%	2,119
Loudoun County	1,558	75.19%	442	21.33%	72	3.47%	0	0.00%	1,116	53.86%	2,072
Louisa County	514	62.53%	296	36.01%	11	1.34%	1	0.12%	218	26.52%	822
Lunenburg County	433	80.04%	96	17.74%	6	1.11%	6	1.11%	337	62.29%	541
Madison County	538	64.82%	292	35.18%	0	0.00%	0	0.00%	246	29.64%	830
Mathews County	467	76.94%	119	19.60%	21	3.46%	0	0.00%	348	57.33%	607
Mecklenburg County	1,021	76.25%	296	22.11%	22	1.64%	0	0.00%	725	54.14%	1,339
Middlesex County	416	72.85%	151	26.44%	4	0.70%	0	0.00%	265	46.41%	571
Montgomery County	650	45.84%	725	51.13%	42	2.96%	1	0.07%	-75	-5.29%	1,418
Nansemond County	678	78.11%	186	21.43%	4	0.46%	0	0.00%	492	56.68%	868
Nelson County	847	75.16%	269	23.87%	10	0.89%	1	0.09%	578	51.29%	1,127
New Kent County	127	62.56%	75	36.95%	1	0.49%	0	0.00%	52	25.62%	203
Norfolk County	1,345	57.63%	977	41.86%	1	0.04%	11	0.47%	368	15.77%	2,334
Northampton County	592	73.00%	210	25.89%	9	1.11%	0	0.00%	382	47.10%	811
Northumberland County	532	70.00%	225	29.61%	3	0.39%	0	0.00%	307	40.39%	760
Nottoway County	470	84.08%	86	15.38%	3	0.54%	0	0.00%	384	68.69%	559
Orange County	568	72.91%	201	25.80%	10	1.28%	0	0.00%	367	47.11%	779
Page County	741	47.08%	804	51.08%	21	1.33%	8	0.51%	-63	-4.00%	1,574
Patrick County	737	53.29%	616	44.54%	30	2.17%	0	0.00%	121	8.75%	1,383
Pittsylvania County	1,718	69.27%	650	26.21%	111	4.48%	1	0.04%	1,068	43.06%	2,480
Powhatan County	240	60.30%	156	39.20%	2	0.50%	0	0.00%	84	21.11%	398
Prince Edward County	576	84.46%	101	14.81%	5	0.73%	0	0.00%	475	69.65%	682
Prince George County	189	67.02%	92	32.62%	1	0.35%	0	0.00%	97	34.40%	282
Prince William County	724	75.57%	228	23.80%	6	0.63%	0	0.00%	496	51.77%	958
Princess Anne County	420	79.10%	109	20.53%	2	0.38%	0	0.00%	311	58.57%	531
Pulaski County	732	48.09%	764	50.20%	6	0.39%	20	1.31%	-32	-2.10%	1,522
Rappahannock County	400	72.07%	151	27.21%	4	0.72%	0	0.00%	249	44.86%	555
Richmond County	377	66.73%	185	32.74%	3	0.53%	0	0.00%	192	33.98%	565
Roanoke County	630	56.96%	427	38.61%	48	4.34%	1	0.09%	203	18.35%	1,106
Rockbridge County	996	51.58%	911	47.18%	23	1.19%	1	0.05%	85	4.40%	1,931
Rockingham County	1,604	51.15%	1,441	45.95%	88	2.81%	3	0.10%	163	5.20%	3,136
Russell County	987	41.26%	1,396	58.36%	9	0.38%	0	0.00%	-409	-17.10%	2,392
Scott County	1,164	39.38%	1,773	59.98%	17	0.58%	2	0.07%	-609	-20.60%	2,956
Shenandoah County	1,098	47.39%	1,189	51.32%	30	1.29%	0	0.00%	-91	-3.93%	2,317
Smyth County	848	39.02%	1,312	60.38%	12	0.55%	1	0.05%	-464	-21.35%	2,173
Southampton County	924	76.94%	260	21.65%	16	1.33%	1	0.08%	664	55.29%	1,201
Spotsylvania County	330	56.80%	237	40.79%	13	2.24%	1	0.17%	93	16.01%	581
Stafford County	301	43.56%	384	55.57%	6	0.87%	0	0.00%	-83	-12.01%	691
Surry County	323	66.19%	154	31.56%	11	2.25%	0	0.00%	169	34.63%	488
Sussex County	253	72.70%	93	26.72%	2	0.57%	0	0.00%	160	45.98%	348
Tazewell County	803	35.33%	1,462	64.32%	5	0.22%	3	0.13%	-659	-28.99%	2,273
Warren County	540	76.49%	151	21.39%	13	1.84%	2	0.28%	389	55.10%	706
Warwick County	108	60.00%	71	39.44%	1	0.56%	0	0.00%	37	20.56%	180
Washington County	1,344	41.62%	1,872	57.97%	13	0.40%	0	0.00%	-528	-16.35%	3,229
Westmoreland County	392	68.06%	181	31.42%	3	0.52%	0	0.00%	211	36.63%	576
Wise County	897	36.11%	1,572	63.29%	9	0.36%	6	0.24%	-675	-27.17%	2,484
Wythe County	1,065	43.33%	1,384	56.31%	8	0.33%	1	0.04%	-319	-12.98%	2,458
York County	186	66.67%	69	24.73%	24	8.60%	0	0.00%	117	41.94%	279
Alexandria City	738	79.18%	187	20.06%	7	0.75%	0	0.00%	551	59.12%	932
Bristol City	297	67.04%	133	30.02%	12	2.71%	1	0.23%	164	37.02%	443
Buena Vista City	125	59.52%	79	37.62%	6	2.86%	0	0.00%	46	21.90%	210
Charlottesville City	391	83.55%	71	15.17%	6	1.28%	0	0.00%	320	68.38%	468
Danville City	836	85.39%	101	10.32%	41	4.19%	1	0.10%	735	75.08%	979
Fredericksburg City	352	73.33%	124	25.83%	4	0.83%	0	0.00%	228	47.50%	480
Lynchburg City	995	76.48%	292	22.44%	13	1.00%	1	0.08%	703	54.04%	1,301
Manchester City	285	79.17%	66	18.33%	7	1.94%	2	0.56%	219	60.83%	360
Newport News City	744	65.21%	335	29.36%	27	2.37%	35	3.07%	409	35.85%	1,141
Norfolk City	2,559	83.19%	457	14.86%	37	1.20%	23	0.75%	2,102	68.34%	3,076
Petersburg City	924	85.95%	144	13.40%	7	0.65%	0	0.00%	780	72.56%	1,075
Portsmouth City	1,151	80.66%	247	17.31%	21	1.47%	8	0.56%	904	63.35%	1,427
Radford City	184	63.01%	100	34.25%	6	2.05%	2	0.68%	84	28.77%	292
Richmond City	3,749	85.40%	569	12.96%	42	0.96%	30	0.68%	3,180	72.44%	4,390
Roanoke City	1,268	69.71%	506	27.82%	45	2.47%	0	0.00%	762	41.89%	1,819
Staunton City	458	70.46%	162	24.92%	30	4.62%	0	0.00%	296	45.54%	650
Williamsburg City	103	72.54%	37	26.06%	2	1.41%	0	0.00%	66	46.48%	142
Winchester City	394	71.25%	146	26.40%	13	2.35%	0	0.00%	248	44.85%	553
Totals	80,649	61.64%	48,180	36.82%	2,013	1.54%	202	0.15%	32,469	24.82%	130,842

== See also ==
- United States presidential elections in Virginia
