= Blue Grass, Virginia =

Unincorporated community in Virginia, United States

- Unincorporated community
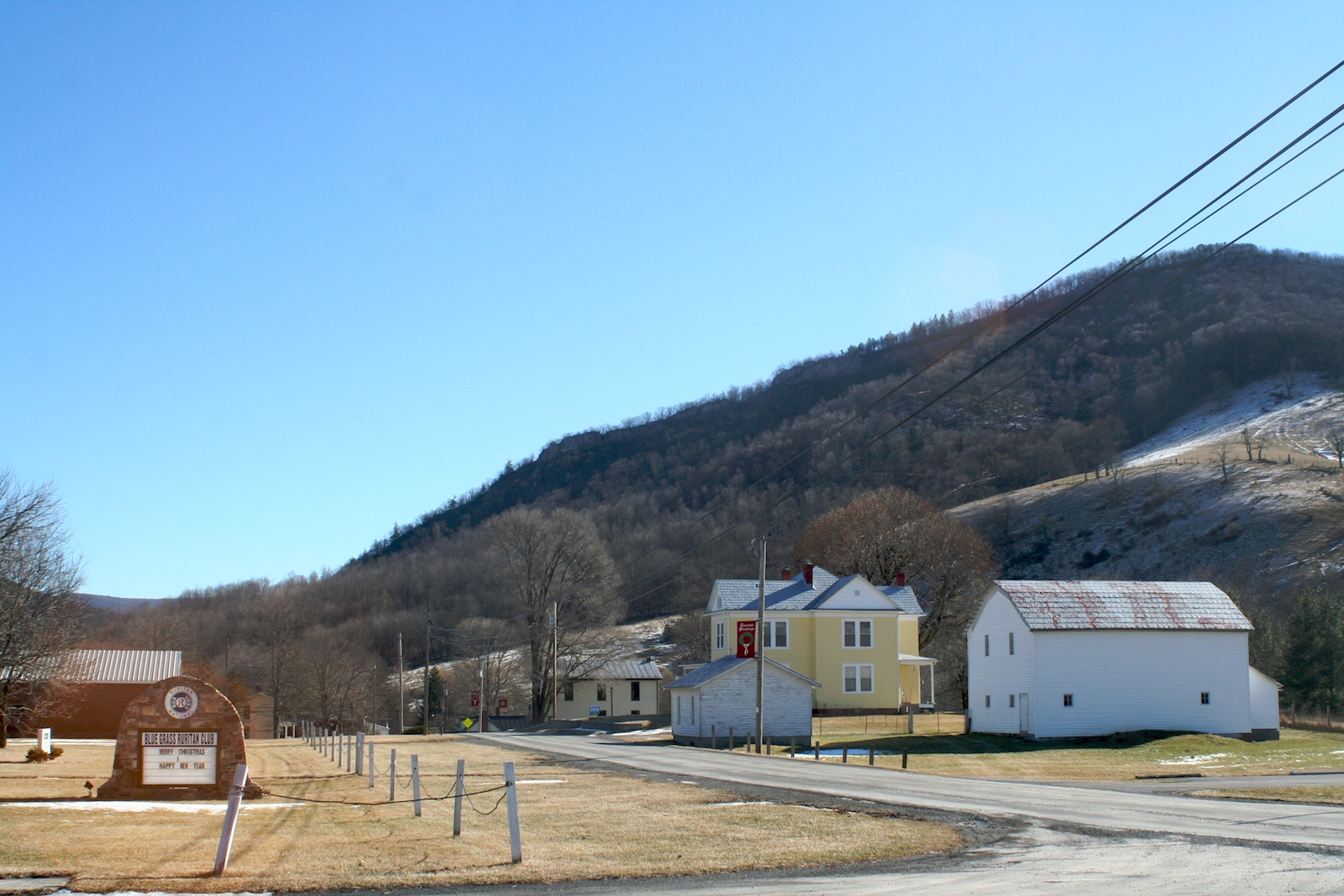
- Blue Grass

- Location within Virginia Location within the United States
- Coordinates: 38°30′0″N 79°32′59″W
- Country: United States
- State: Virginia
- County: Highland
- Elevation: 2,549 ft (777 m)
- Time zone: UTC−5 (Eastern (EST))
  - Summer (DST): UTC−4 (EDT)
- ZIP codes: 24413
- GNIS feature ID: 1481852

Blue Grass is an unincorporated community on VA 642 at its junction with VA 640 in Highland County, Virginia, United States. Blue Grass lies along the South Branch Potomac River and is located approximately 6.1 miles (9.8 km) north of Monterey. It was previously known as Crabbottom and Hulls Store before the Board on Geographic Names officially decided upon Blue Grass in 1950. Near Blue Grass is the Devils Backbone rock formation. Blue Grass has a post office with ZIP code 24413. The Hollywood silent film classic Tol'able David was filmed in Blue Grass during 1921.
