= West Bethel, Virginia =

United States designated area

West Bethel, Virginia (Amherst County, Virginia) was a small town that was granted a charter in December 1801. It began with an inspection station-warehouse, a ferry, a dam and a flour mill, all built by Thomas Cocke and Nicolos Clayton Davies of Bedford County, Virginia. It was a booming town during its day due to its proximity to the James River. It eventually grew to include a modest hotel with a ballroom, a tavern, a lumber house, and several homes. Its remoteness and the death of the canal system in the 1870s killed the town, though the ferry continued to operate into the 20th century.

== Bethel, or Salt Creek Ferry ==
First known as Davies Lower Ferry, established in the 1770s in Bedford County, Virginia. There was a Lewis Davies Ferry in 1774. Also, known as Lewis Davies Fishing Shore in 1882 (Bedford Ct. Order). Bennet A. Crawford advertised in the Lynchburg Press 11/2/1821 to rent Bethel Ferry. In 1864 during the American Civil War, General John D. Imboden crossed at this point of the river to reach Lynchburg, Virginia to repel Hunter's Advance. In 1881, the Richmond and Alleghany Railroad paid Edward Fletcher for privileges to use the ferry. Fletcher had purchased Bethel Ferry from Samuel L. Wortham (Amherst Deed NN p. 70). An iron screw eye fastened into rock can be seen where the ferry once crossed. The railroad may have changed operation of this ferry to the Bedford side of the river, known as Abert, Virginia.

== Trent's Ferry ==
Trent's Ferry was petitioned for October 1776.

"at or near the lower end of Henry Trent's land on the north side of the river in Amherst County to the land of Nicholas Davies in Bedford Co. ...". Price for a man, three pence; same for a horse."

Innkeepers in early Amherst County had to petition the court for a license to run a tavern or ordinary. The following court orders are taken from 1778 to 1782 and are licenses to keep an ordinary. Thomas Moffit at his home, Charles Asley, George Blaine, William Depriest, John Merritt, Obadiah Henry Trent at Trent's Ferry, William Powell at the Court House, Willia Kyle at his house, John Peyton, Jacob Broan, Abraham Warwick at Findley's Gap, John Lawrence at his house, Samuel Camp at the place where Gabriel Penn lived, John Henry Goodwin at his house near John Lynch's ferry.
