= Bethel, Highland County, Virginia =

Unincorporated community in Virginia, United States

- Unincorporated community
- Location within Virginia Location within the United States
- Coordinates: 38°14′52″N 79°38′59″W
- Country: United States
- State: Virginia
- County: Highland
- Elevation: 2,664 ft (812 m)
- Time zone: UTC-5 (Eastern (EST))
  - Summer (DST): UTC-4 (EDT)
- Area code: 540
- GNIS feature ID: 1673764

Bethel is an unincorporated community in Highland County, Virginia, United States. Bethel is located approximately 11.9 miles (19.2 km) south of Monterey. The community is situated between two mountain ridges in the Big Valley near Bolar Run on Virginia State Route 607.
