= Doe Hill, Virginia =

Unincorporated community in Virginia, United States

- Unincorporated community
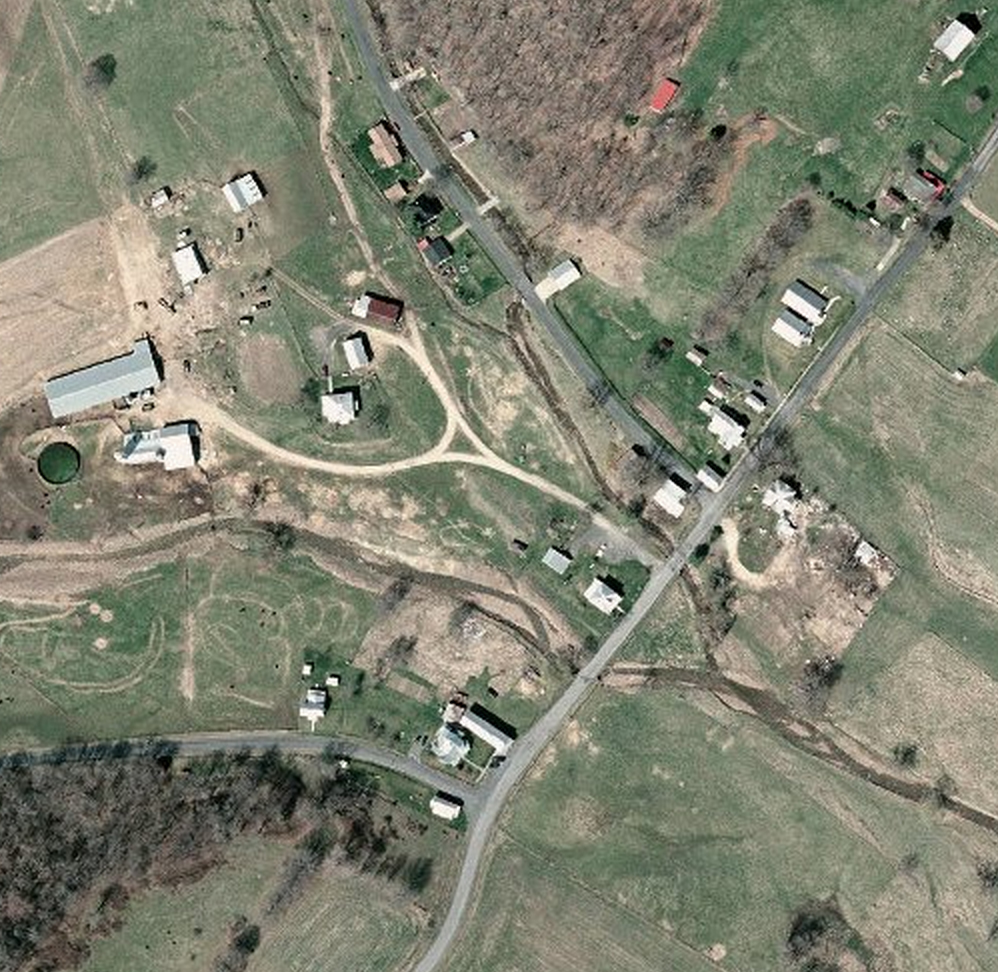
- Aerial view of Doe Hill, Virginia

- Location within Virginia Location within the United States
- Coordinates: 38°25′55″N 79°26′40″W
- Country: United States
- State: Virginia
- County: Highland
- Elevation: 2,510 ft (770 m)
- Time zone: UTC-5 (Eastern (EST))
  - Summer (DST): UTC-4 (EDT)
- ZIP code: 24433
- Area code: 540
- GNIS feature ID: 1492871

Doe Hill is an unincorporated community in Highland County, Virginia, United States. Doe Hill is located 1.1 miles (1.8 km) southwest of the border with West Virginia on State Route 654. Doe Hill has a post office with ZIP code 24433. The community was named for the great number of does that could be seen in the nearby hills in earlier times.

Doe Hill is often mentioned in the 1970s family drama, The Waltons, by character Corabeth Godsey, played by Ronnie Claire Edwards.
