= Highland County, Virginia =

County in Virginia, United States

- County
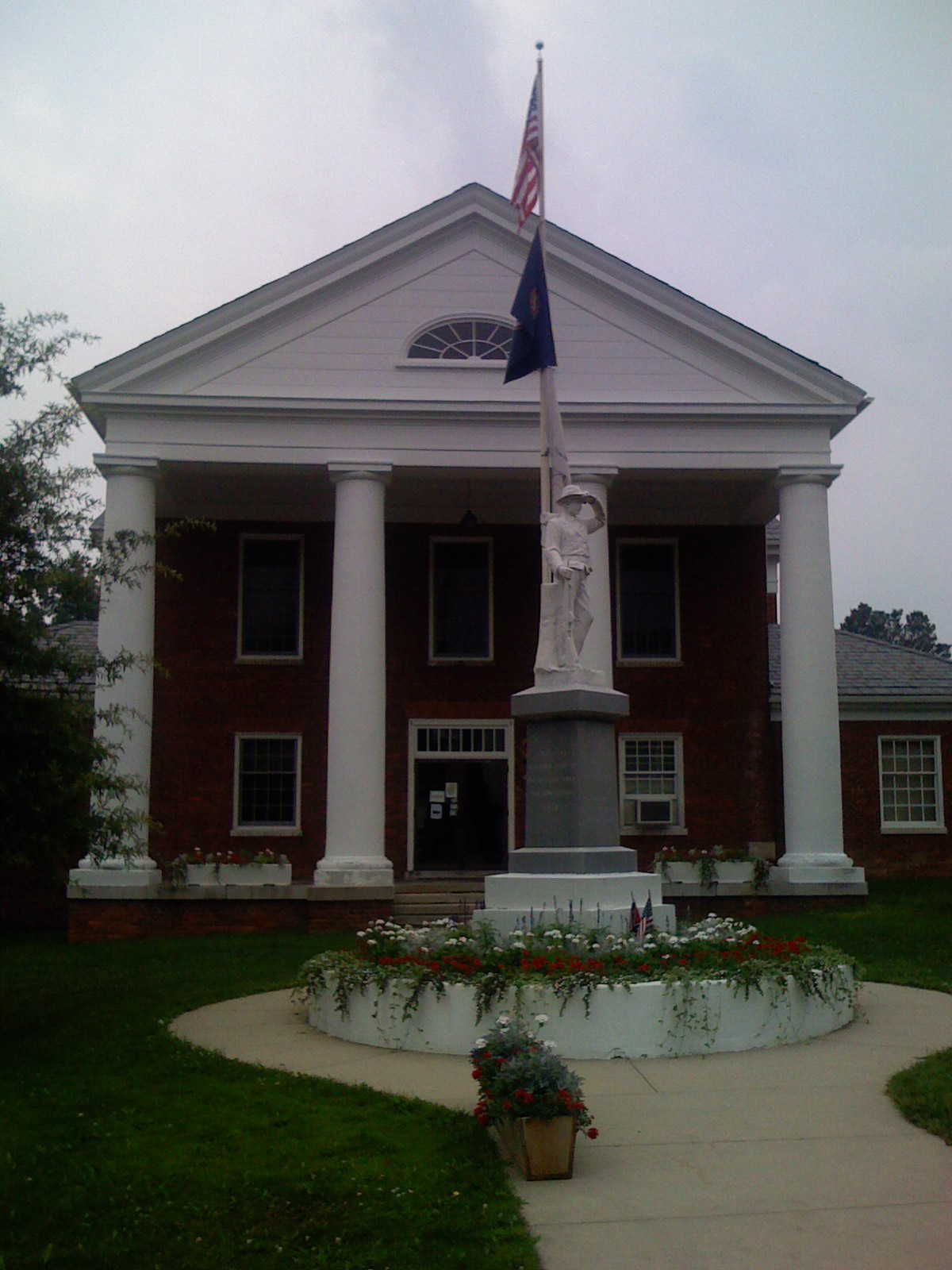
- Highland County Courthouse in Monterey

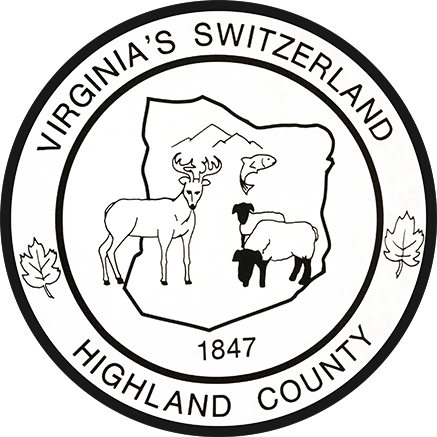
- Seal

- Location within the U.S. state of Virginia
- Coordinates: 38°21′N 79°34′W
- Country: United States
- State: Virginia
- Founded: 1847
- Seat: Monterey
- Largest town: Monterey

Area
  - Total: 416 sq mi (1,080 km^{2})
  - Land: 415 sq mi (1,070 km^{2})
  - Water: 0.7 sq mi (1.8 km^{2}) 0.2%

Population (2020)
  - Total: 2,232
  - Estimate (2025): 2,318 ▲
  - Density: 5.38/sq mi (2.08/km^{2})
- Time zone: UTC−5 (Eastern)
  - Summer (DST): UTC−4 (EDT)
- Congressional district: 6th
- Website: www.highlandcova.org

Highland County is a county located in the Commonwealth of Virginia. As of the 2020 census, the population was 2,232, making it the state's least populous jurisdiction, including counties and independent cities. Its county seat is Monterey. Known as "Virginia's Switzerland" or "Virginia's Little Switzerland", Highland lays claim to being one of the least populous counties east of the Mississippi River, and is the second-highest county in Virginia by average elevation after Grayson.

== History ==
Settlement of this portion of the Colony of Virginia by Europeans began around 1745. Located west of the Tidewater and Piedmont regions in Virginia and also west of the Shenandoah Valley, this area is beyond (known in old Virginia as the "Transmountaine") the Blue Ridge Mountains. Rather than cross such a formidable physical barrier, most early settlers came southerly up the Valley across the Potomac River from Maryland and Pennsylvania. Many followed the Great Wagon Road, also known as the Valley Pike (U.S. Route 11 in modern times). As German immigrants began to push over the mountains to the northern area of the present county, those of Scots-Irish descent settled in the southern part.

Even after Virginia and the other 12 colonies won their independence from Great Britain after the American Revolutionary War, the area remained sparsely populated. In the 1840s, the historic Staunton-Parkersburg Turnpike was built through the area. Engineered by Claudius Crozet through the mountainous terrain, it was a toll road partially funded by the Virginia Board of Public Works. The turnpike formed an important link between the upper Shenandoah Valley with the Ohio River.

Highland County was formed in 1847 from Bath County and Pendleton County after a bill was passed by the Virginia General Assembly on March 19 of that year. The desire for the new county's formation arose due to multiple reasons, including the distances from the areas in present-day Highland to the county seats of Bath and Pendleton and the advantageous position of the new turnpike. Highland was named for its lofty elevation.

Control of the Staunton-Parkersburg Turnpike became crucial during the American Civil War (1861–1865). By all accounts, documented in many letters home from young troops, a miserable winter in 1861 was spent by Union and Confederate troops holding opposing high elevation positions along the road. The Battle of McDowell, the first Confederate victory of Stonewall Jackson's Shenandoah Valley campaign, took place at McDowell on May 8, 1862.

In the 20th century, the Turnpike was re-designated as U.S. Route 250. In the 21st century, it remains Highland County's major east–west roadway, and crossing into West Virginia, becomes a National Scenic Byway.

== Geography ==
According to the U.S. Census Bureau, Highland County has a total area of 415.9 square miles (1,077.2 km^{2}), of which 415.2 square miles (1,075.4 km^{2}) is land and 0.7 square miles (1.8 km^{2}) (0.2%) is water.

The county's western border is naturally defined and lies along the Eastern Continental Divide in the Allegheny Mountains. Likewise, the eastern border lies along the ridge line of Shenandoah Mountain. The northern and southern boundaries of the county are defined more artificially, cutting across numerous mountain ridges and valleys. The county is bordered to the west by Pocahontas County in the state of West Virginia, to the north by Pendleton County, West Virginia, to the east by Augusta County, Virginia, and to the south by Bath County, Virginia. The county is 153 miles (246 km) northwest of Richmond, Virginia.

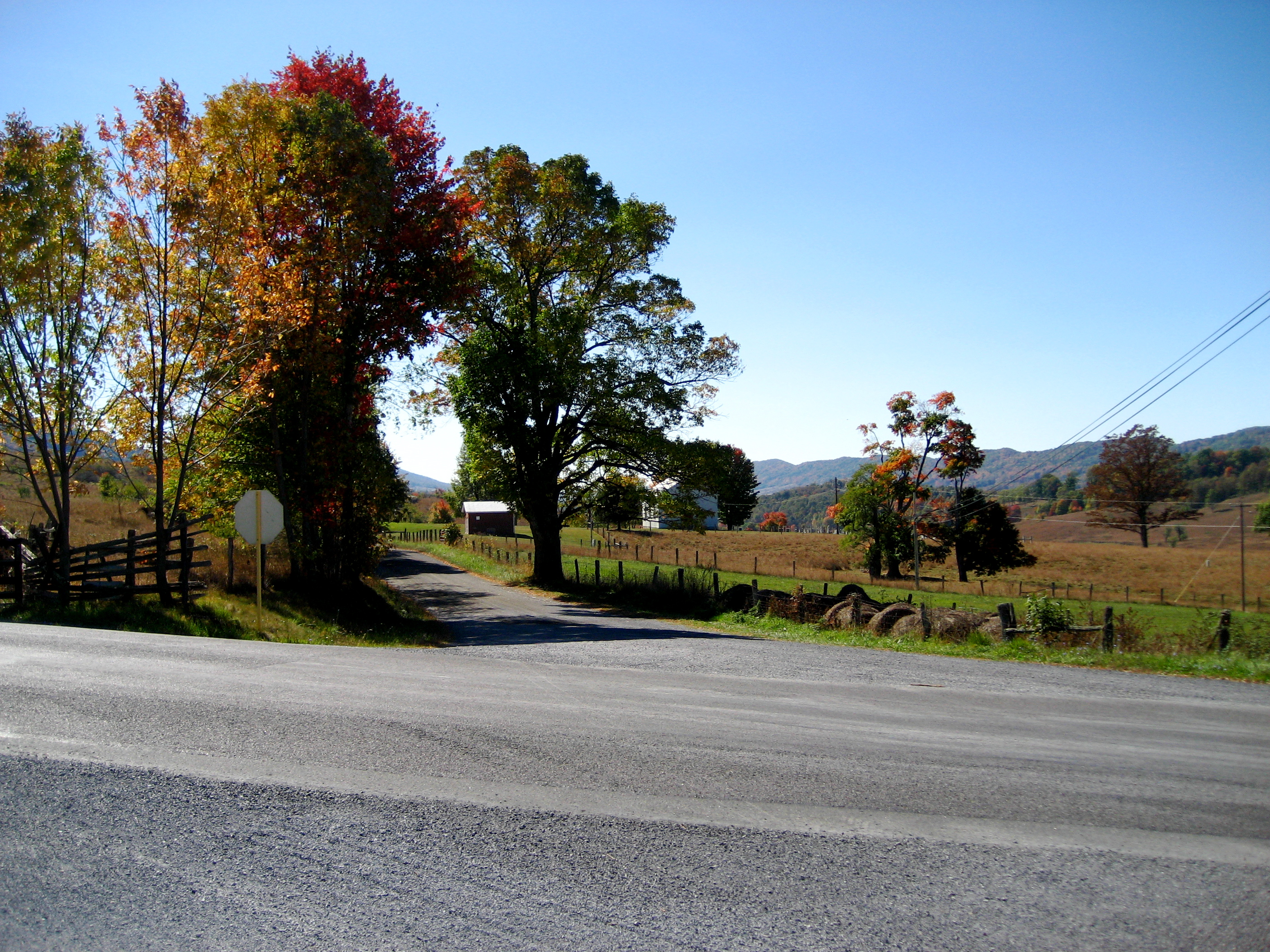
A typical view of valleys and mountain ridges near Hightown

The average elevation of Highland County is 2,832 feet (863 m), which is the 16th highest average elevation among counties in the Eastern United States. The highest elevation in the county is 4,545 feet (1,385 m) in the Allegheny Mountains and the lowest elevation is 1,625 feet (495 m) near the Cowpasture River southwest of Patna. The western regions of the county are generally higher in elevation than are the eastern and especially southeastern regions. As the county lies within the Ridge-and-Valley province of the Appalachian Mountains, it features numerous valleys and mountain ridges that are generally oriented in a "northeast to southwest" direction. The valleys are from west to east the Alleghany Valley, the Bluegrass Valley, the Monterey Valley, the Bullpasture Valley, and the Cowpasture Valley. The majority of the county and all the southern portions of the county form part of the James River watershed, while northern sections drain into the Potomac River. West of Monterey, the divide is roughly centered along the path of U.S. Route 250; however, in eastern Highland County, the James watershed extends further northward.

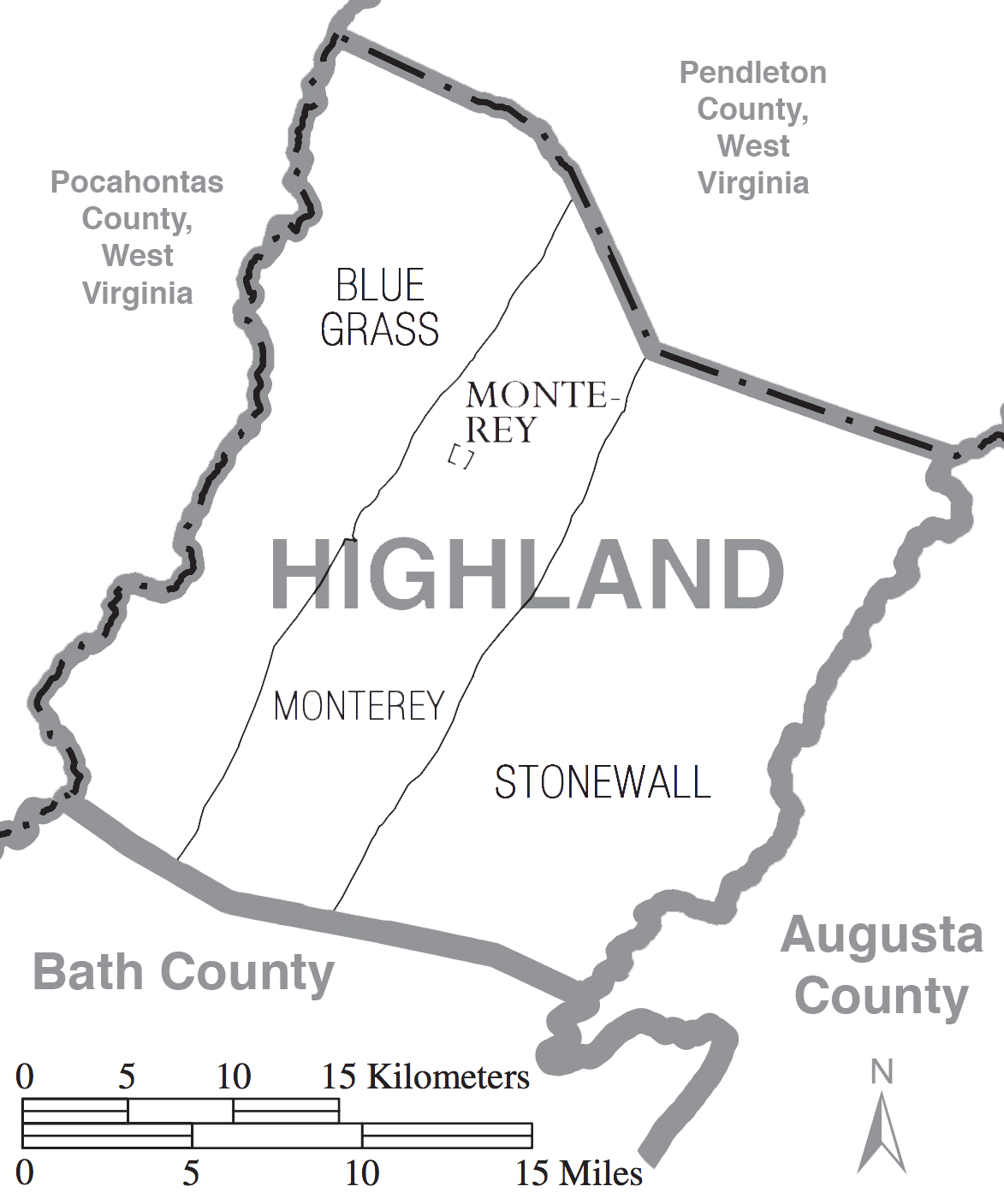
Map of Highland County showing magisterial districts

The westernmost valley, the Alleghany Valley, is narrow and situated between Allegheny Mountain to the west and Lantz Mountain to the east. It is drained by Back Creek, a tributary of the Jackson River, in the southern section of the county and is drained by Straight Fork to the north. The Laurel Fork runs to the west of Alleghany Valley, joining the Straight Fork in Pendleton County, West Virginia to the north to form the North Fork South Branch Potomac River. The Bluegrass Valley contains the headwaters of the Jackson River south of U.S. 250 and the South Branch Potomac River to the north. The northern section of the valley, in the area of the village of Blue Grass, is considerably wider than the southern section of the valley. The Jackson River flows out of Bluegrass Valley to the east through Vanderpool Gap approximately 4 miles (6.4 km) south of Hightown. A short distance south, the Bluegrass Valley is drained by the Back Creek. Monterey Valley is located roughly in the center of the county, and its drainage is separated at Monterey. To the north of Monterey, the valley is drained by the Strait Creek and South Branch Potomac River; to the south, the valley is drained by the Jackson River. The Bullpasture Valley is drained throughout the county to the south by the Bullpasture River. The Cowpasture Valley, the easternmost valley in the county, is mostly drained to the south by the Cowpasture River, although a small portion to the north is drained by the South Fork South Branch Potomac River.

=== Adjacent counties ===
- Augusta County (southeast)
- Bath County (south)
- Pendleton County, West Virginia (north)
- Pocahontas County, West Virginia (west)

=== Protected areas ===
Highland County contains parts of the George Washington National Forest concentrated mainly along the county's western and eastern borders. The Highland Wildlife Management Area, held by the Virginia Department of Wildlife Resources, is a 14,283-acre (57.80 km^{2}) wildlife preserve located in three distinct locations within the county. These locations include the Jack Mountain tract southwest of McDowell, the Bullpasture Mountain tract south of McDowell in the southeastern corner of the county, and the Little Doe Hill tract west of McDowell. The national forest and Highland Wildlife Management Area combined account for 71,455 acres (289.17 km^{2}) of Highland County's land, or approximately 28% of the county's total land area.

All of Highland County is located within the United States National Radio Quiet Zone, a 13,000-square-mile (34,000 km^{2}) area of limited radio activity. The area is intended to minimize interference at the Green Bank Telescope operated by the National Radio Astronomy Observatory in Green Bank, West Virginia and the Sugar Grove Station in Sugar Grove, West Virginia.

== Climate and weather ==
Monterey, VA

Climate chart (precipitation, max. and min. temperature)
J	F	M	A	M	J	J	A	S	O	N	D
3.4 37 17	3.2 41 18	4.1 49 26	3.7 59 34	4.3 68 44	4.1 76 52	4.2 80 56	2.9 78 54	3.4 72 48	3.6 63 37	3.6 51 29	3.5 42 21
- █ Average max. and min. temperatures in °F
- █ Precipitation totals in inches
- Source: NOAA (normals, 1971–2000); The Weather Channel
Metric conversion
J	F	M	A	M	J	J	A	S	O	N	D
85 3 −8	80 5 −8	104 9 −3	95 15 1	109 20 7	104 24 11	108 27 13	75 26 12	86 22 9	90 17 3	90 11 −2	88 6 −6
- █ Average max. and min. temperatures in °C
- █ Precipitation totals in mm

Highland County is in the marine west coast climate zone, with a Köppen Climate Classification of Cfb. As such, Highland experiences warm summers with an average temperature less than 72 °F (22 °C) during all months. In addition, the region features consistent rainfall year-round and lacks a dry season. Monterey, the county seat, is representative of the average climate of Highland, as it is situated at roughly the mean elevation for the county. Locations in the county's higher elevations experience cooler temperatures whereas locations in lower elevations experience warmer and milder temperatures. The lowest temperature on record in Monterey occurred in January 1985 at −26 °F (−32.2 °C) and the highest recorded temperature occurred in July 1952 at 95 °F (35 °C). The winter season is long in Highland, though less severely cold than other locations. The average annual temperature for the county is 47.6 °F (8.7 °C). From 1948 to 1990, the average annual precipitation was 40.96 inches or 1,040.4 millimetres and the average annual snowfall was 34.40 inches or 0.87 metres.

Tornadoes in Highland County are very rare, with only one tornado on record in the county with the National Weather Service. This tornado occurred on April 28, 1959, at approximately 3:00 PM near Mustoe. The tornado's classification on the Fujita scale is reported by the National Weather Service in its database to be unknown, though another document records it as an F1. The exact path of the tornado is uncertain, however, no damage or injuries were reported. Another possible, but unconfirmed, tornado touchdown may have occurred on April 4, 1974, during the 1974 Super Outbreak. A barn and chicken house were damaged during this storm and a building was lifted off its foundation in the Big Valley area.

Since 1955, Highland County has experienced twenty instances of severe hail, which is defined by the National Weather Service as hailstones having a diameter of at least 1 inch (2.5 cm). If the old definition of at least 3/4 inch (1.9 cm) diameter hailstones is considered, the county has experienced twenty-two instances of severe hail during the same period.

Highland County has significant wind resources, attaining an average annual wind power class of 5 in some regions. Class 5 wind power is considered excellent for generating electricity via wind power, with average annual wind speeds between 16.8 and 17.9 miles per hour (27.0 and 28.8 km/h). Between 1955 and 2012, there have been twenty-one instances of damaging wind in the county on record with the National Weather Service. Of the nine instances which have estimated wind speeds, the average maximum gust speed was 52.8 miles per hour (85.0 km/h).

== Economy ==
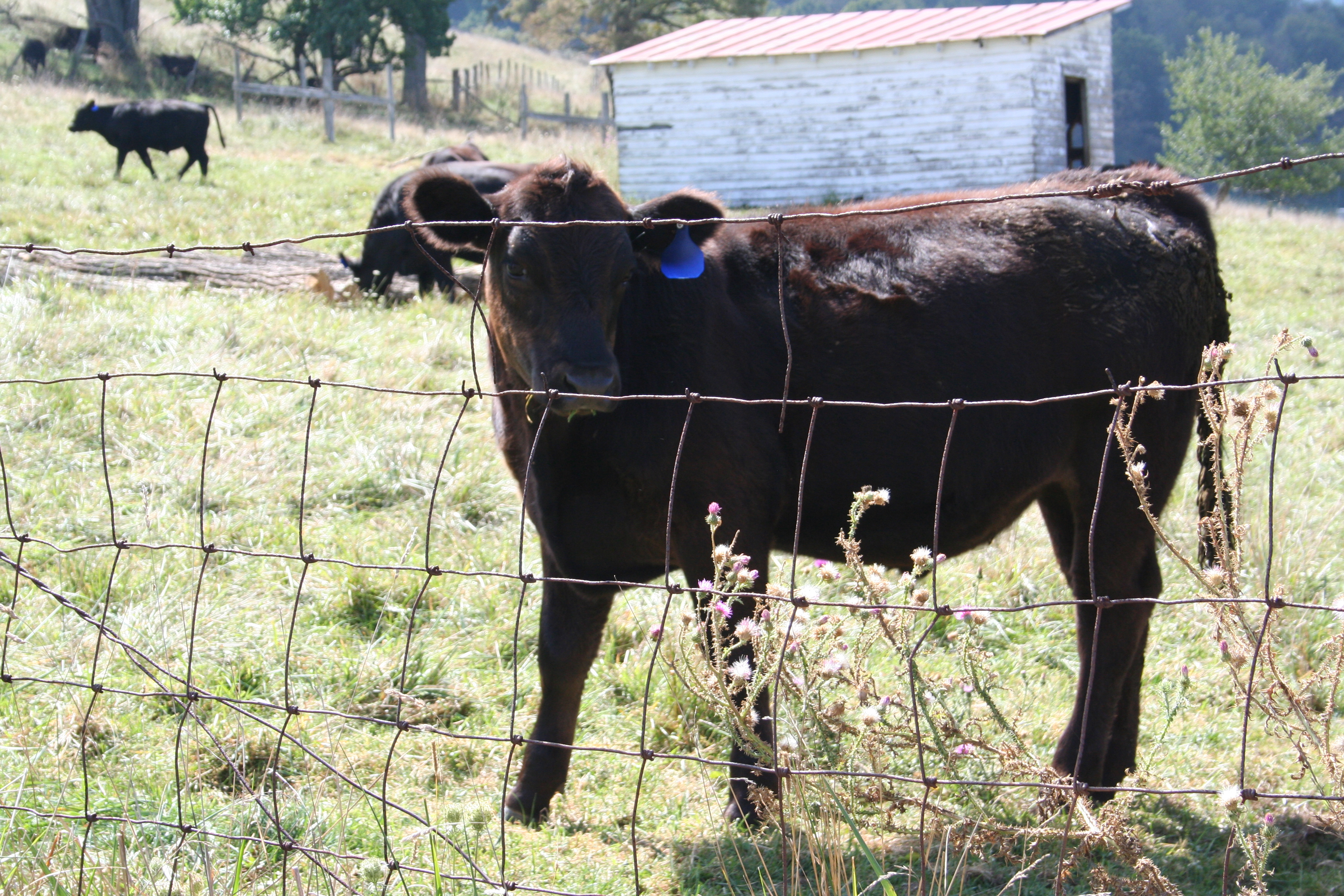
Cattle near Blue Grass

In October 2013, Highland County's labor force was composed of 1,142 people and had an unemployment rate of 5.3%. Historically, agriculture has played a significant role in the economy of Highland County. Cattle grazing is especially suited for the area as the mountainous terrain leaves only a small fraction of the total land suitable for cultivation. Agricultural purposes use approximately 36% of the county's land. In 2012, agriculture, forestry, fishing, and hunting accounted for 7.8% of the jobs in the county. According to 2007 census data, there were 239 farms, 76,764 acres (310.65 km^{2}) of farmland, and 8,581 acres (34.73 km^{2}) of harvested cropland in the county. Wool production is a significant industry in the county, which was ranked fifth in Virginia in 2010 for the largest number of lamb and sheep with approximately 4,500 head. Highland County in 2010 had approximately 8,000 head of cattle, 53rd in the state, and produced 15,700 tons of hay in 2009, also ranked 53rd in the state. The county has 211,300 acres (855 km^{2}) of timberland, of which the majority is on private lands. Between 1986 and 2001, the average annual average harvest value of timber in the county was $1,248,889, ranked 54th in the state.

The largest employment sector in the county in 2012 was government, accounting for 34.1% of jobs. Among government jobs, local government jobs represented the majority, with 25.7% of jobs in all sectors. The finance and insurance sector accounted for 9.6% of all jobs, and health care and social assistance accounted for 8.2%. Construction held 7.2% of jobs, followed by retail trade with 6.8%. The remainder of jobs were distributed among various other sectors. The largest employers were Allen Lowry Logging and Highland County Public Schools.

Highland County is located in the Appalachian region as defined by the Appalachian Regional Commission (ARC). The county as of 2014 is considered to have a "transitional" economy by the ARC, meaning it ranks "between the worst 25 percent and the best 25 percent" of counties and it is in a transitional period between weak and strong economies.

In 2023, some job sectors of Highland County have seen some growth from 2012 data at: 25.5% Management occupations, 13.5% Office administrations, 9.38% construction and extraction, and 5.03% farming. Farming, fishing and forestry occupations declined from 2012.

== Transportation ==
=== Highways ===
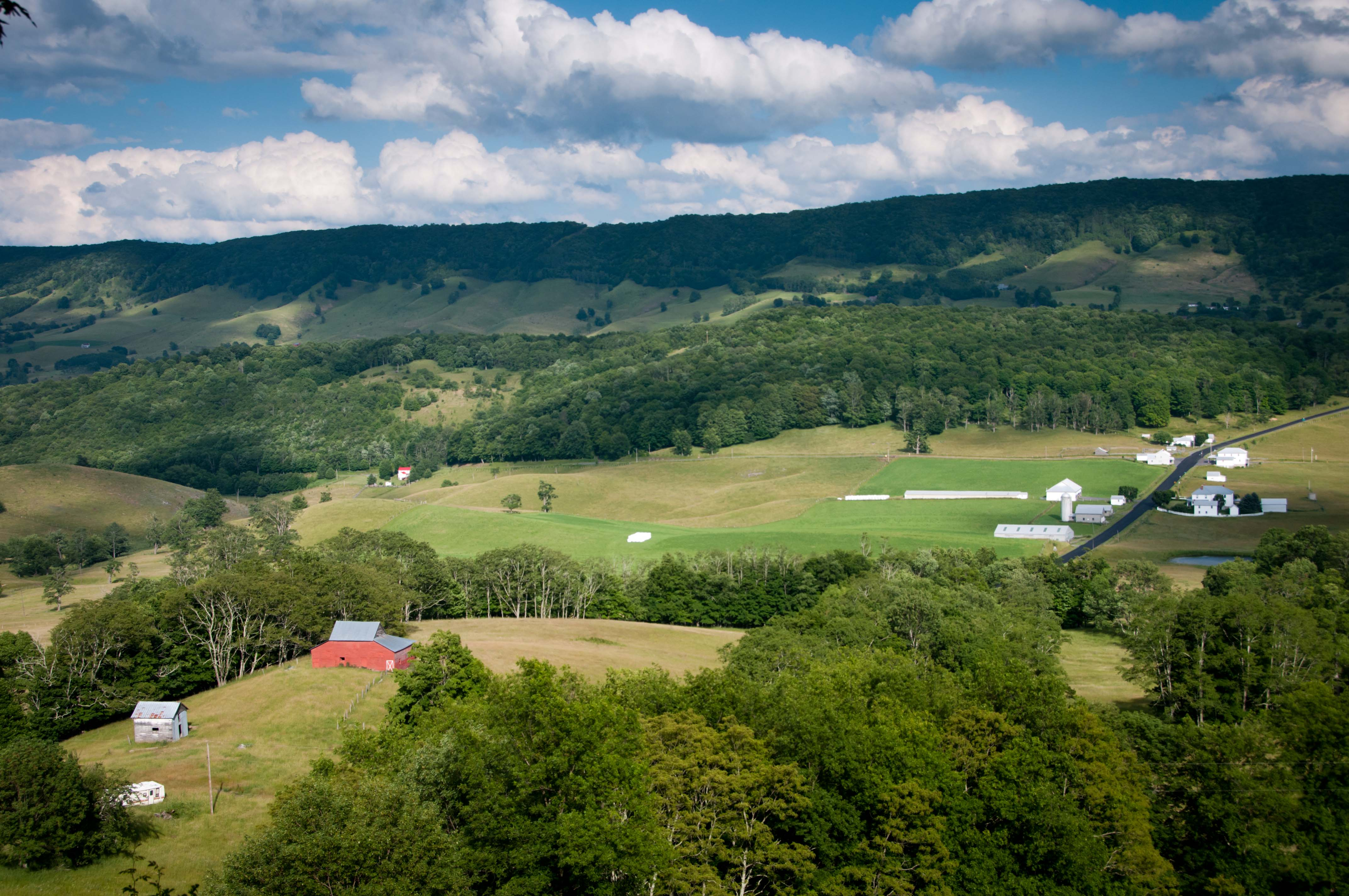
U.S. Route 250 near Hightown

Highland County does not possess within its borders any section of the Interstate Highway System, though east–west Interstate 64 and north–south Interstate 81 are accessible in adjacent Augusta County near Staunton. Highland County has three primary state highways, which are Virginia State Route 84 and two U.S. Routes, U.S. Route 250 and U.S. Route 220. These primary routes have experienced increases in traffic volumes in recent years, although the highest annual average daily traffic for any location in the county in 2008 was 1600 vehicles. All primary routes and over 213 miles (343 km) of secondary roads in the county are serviced and maintained by the Virginia Department of Transportation.

==== U.S. Route 250 ====
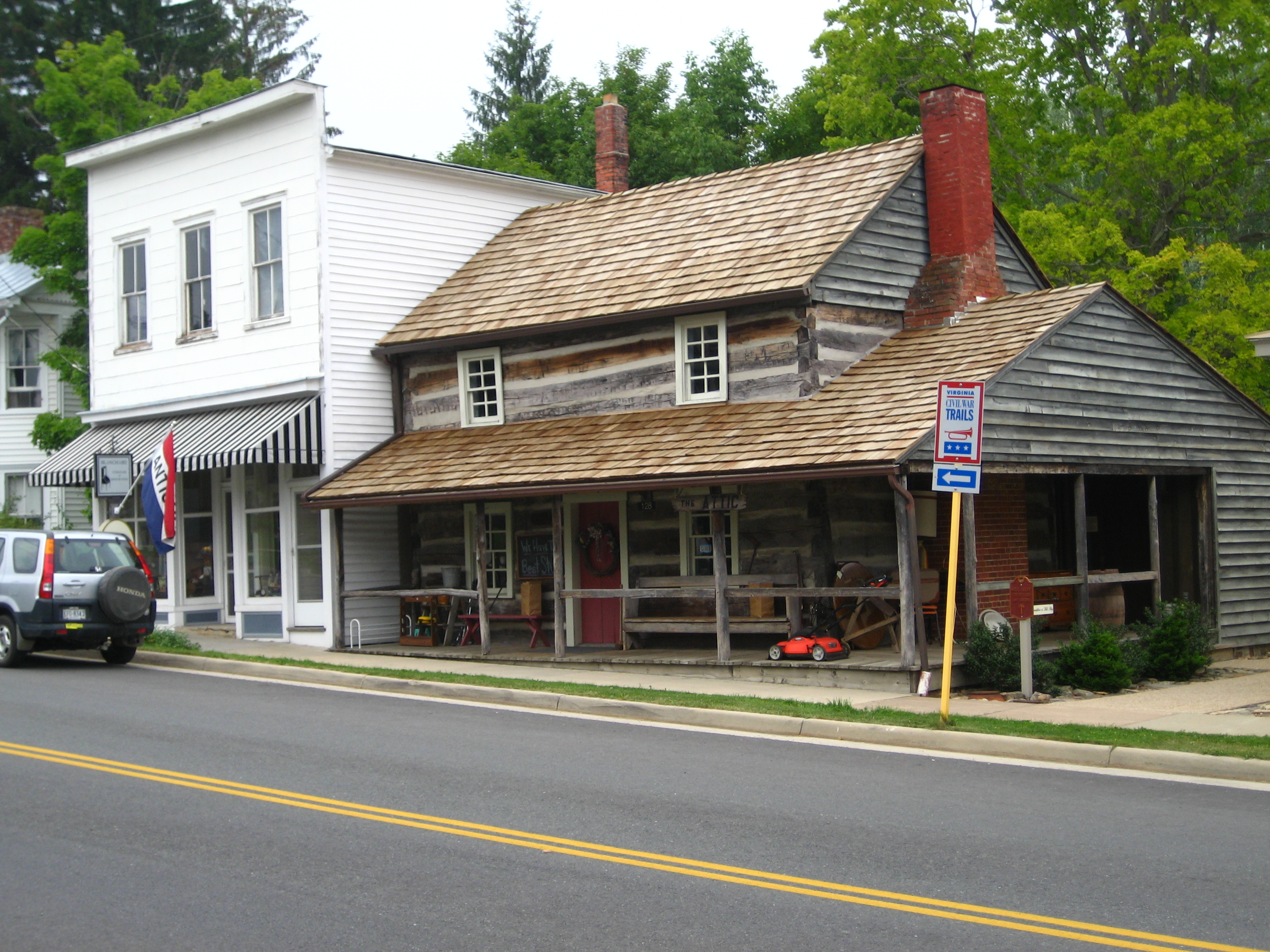
U.S. 250 in Monterey

U.S. 250 enters Highland County from the west on the Virginia-West Virginia border from Pocahontas County, West Virginia at an elevation of approximately 4,280 feet (1,300 m). The road traverses 32.45 miles (52.22 km) within the county. Upon entering the county, U.S. 250 descends into the Back Creek valley, whereafter it crosses the long ridge of Lantz mountain. The route then reaches the village of Hightown where it intersects Virginia State Route 640. Hightown marks the division between the watersheds of the James and Potomac Rivers, for the headwaters of the Jackson River, a tributary of the James, and the South Branch Potomac River are located near the village. After leaving Hightown, U.S. 250 ascends Monterey Mountain before descending to the county's seat of Monterey. In Monterey, U.S. 250, the county's major east–west route, intersects the county's major north–south route, U.S. 220. Continuing eastward, U.S. 250 follows the flow of Crab Run through mountainous terrain towards McDowell. Here, the route crosses the Bullpasture River and winds its way towards the Cowpasture River, after which it enters the village of Head Waters. From Head Waters, U.S. 250 ascends in elevation on a winding and mountainous path to enter Augusta County, Virginia over Shenandoah Mountain. Continuing on U.S. 250 east provides access to Interstate 64 and Interstate 81 near Staunton.

==== U.S. Route 220 ====
U.S. 220 is Highland County's major north–south route, entering Highland County from the north from Pendleton County, West Virginia. The road traverses 23.59 miles (37.96 km) within the county. Approximately 3/4 mile (1.2 km) after entering the county, U.S. 220 crosses the South Branch Potomac River at Forks of Waters. Leaving Forks of Waters, U.S. 220 continues in a southwesterly direction on a roughly straight and level route passing the village of Possum Trot to the town of Monterey. Here, the route intersects U.S. Route 250. South of Monterey, U.S. 220 passes by Trimble Knob, a conical shaped hill that was an active volcano or diatreme 35 million years ago. Continuing south, U.S. 220 follows creek and river valleys in between mountain ridges and passes through the villages of Vanderpool and Mustoe. Approximately 15 miles (24 km) south of Monterey, U.S. 220 enters Bath County, Virginia near the village of Bolar. Following U.S. 220 south through Bath County into Alleghany County, Virginia leads to a connection with Interstate 64 near Covington, Virginia.

==== Virginia State Route 84 ====
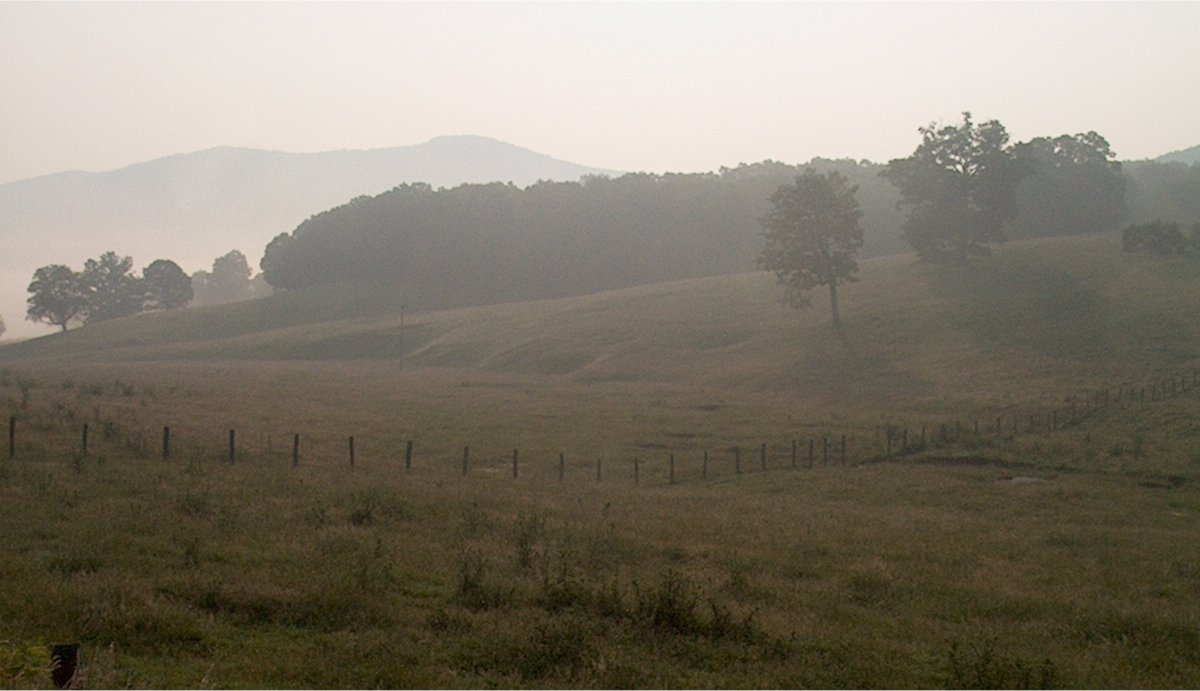
A foggy summer morning viewed from State Route 84

State Route 84 enters Highland County from Pocahontas County, West Virginia in the southwestern part of Highland. The route travels 14.94 miles (24.04 km) in Highland through the villages of Mill Gap and Meadowdale before reaching U.S. 220 at Vanderpool.

=== Other transportation ===
Highland County has no public airfields; however, there is a private airfield located within the county south of Monterey. Commercial air transportation is available at the Shenandoah Valley Regional Airport in neighboring Augusta County, Virginia. Highland County also lacks any rail lines; the nearest railroad is a CSX Transportation line located in Augusta County, which also provides passenger rail service via Amtrak in Staunton. Historically, no permanent rail lines ever existed within the county's borders, though several were proposed. In the 1870s, there were prospects of a railroad named the Washington, Cincinnati, and St. Louis Railroad entering the county. This line was proposed as a narrow gauge railroad to be built from Harrisonburg, Virginia to Monterey and then westward into West Virginia, eventually reaching western markets. The railroad, which has been described as being "so poorly conceived that its failure was inevitable", was never built. Another potential railroad to enter Highland County was chartered by the Virginia General Assembly on February 29, 1892, as the Augusta, Highland, and Alleghany Railroad. This railroad was to connect with either the Chesapeake and Ohio Railway or Valley Railroad in Augusta County and build a line towards Monterey. The Augusta, Highland, and Alleghany Railroad appears to have never been organized or built, as documents from 1911 and 1922 state that no railroad existed in the county. The prospects of a railroad reaching Highland were limited due to the mountainous terrain and a general lack of sufficient traffic to make such an investment economically viable.

== Community services ==
=== Education ===
Currently, public education in Highland County for grades K-12 is provided by Highland County Public Schools. The district has one elementary school, Highland Elementary School, serving grades kindergarten through 5th, and one high school, Highland High School, serving grades 6th though 12th. The high school includes a middle school division consisting of grades 6th through 8th that is in a separate location in the building from the core high school. Both the elementary and high schools are housed in one building located southeast of Monterey. The district is the smallest school district in Virginia in terms of the student body, with a total student count just exceeding 200.

The first record of educational services in the area of Highland County is from 1755 with the arrival of a teacher by the name of William Steuart. It was not until 1820 that education became publicly supported, having been left to private hands previously. Though the system established in 1820 was of a rudimentary quality, books sufficient for teaching the three Rs were provided by public funds. Additional subjects were studied, such as geography and grammar, as resources were available. The first tax levied in support of the public schools was passed in 1847 and the county was divided into twelve school districts in 1850. Numerous small schools were distributed throughout the county, and by 1893, there was a total of 47 schools. By the early 1900s, the county was divided into three school districts: Blue Grass, Monterey, and Stonewall. In 1922, the county's school districts were consolidated into one district and there were "52 one- and two-room grammar schools" and "three accredited four-year high schools". By 1929, the total number of schools decreased to 32 as the school district became more consolidated. In 1957, all high schools in the county were consolidated and all high school students were located at the Monterey High School. High school students were again transferred in 1963 to the current high school building, and by 1985, all elementary students were transferred to Monterey Elementary School, housed in the building previously used as the Monterey High School. In 1997, the elementary school was transferred to the complex of the high school, forming the present day status of the school district.

There are no colleges or universities located in Highland County. There are several colleges and universities, however, within the neighboring counties and surrounding area. These include Blue Ridge Community College, James Madison University, Washington and Lee University, and the University of Virginia, among others. These institutions are generally within a two-hour drive from Highland County.

=== Healthcare ===
Highland County does not have a hospital, the closest being in neighboring Augusta and Bath Counties, such as Augusta Health. The Highland Medical Center, Inc. is located in Monterey and is the only general patient care medical facility in Highland County. The center opened in 1996 and became a Federally Qualified Health Center in 2003. Highland County is one of four counties in Virginia and one of only 50 counties in states east of the Mississippi River (excluding Minnesota) that is designated as a frontier county. This designation is applied because of Highland's remote characteristics with a low population density and limited access to healthcare and other services.

=== Emergency services ===
There are three volunteer fire departments servicing Highland County. The southern portions of the county are serviced by the Bolar Volunteer Fire Department headquartered in the village of Bolar in neighboring Bath County, Virginia. The McDowell Volunteer Fire Department, organized in 1978, serves the areas of McDowell, Doe Hill, and Head Waters. The areas of Monterey and Blue Grass are served by the Highland County Volunteer Fire Department. Rescue squad services for the county are provided by the Highland County Volunteer Rescue Squad which has locations in Monterey and McDowell.

The Highland County Sheriff's Office provides law enforcement services to the entire county and is located in Monterey. In 2012, the department had 7 sworn deputies and employed 5 civilians.

== Demographics ==
Historical population
Census	Pop.	Note	%±
1850	4,227		—
1860	4,319		2.2%
1870	4,151		−3.9%
1880	5,164		24.4%
1890	5,352		3.6%
1900	5,647		5.5%
1910	5,317		−5.8%
1920	4,931		−7.3%
1930	4,525		−8.2%
1940	4,875		7.7%
1950	4,069		−16.5%
1960	3,221		−20.8%
1970	2,529		−21.5%
1980	2,937		16.1%
1990	2,635		−10.3%
2000	2,536		−3.8%
2010	2,321		−8.5%
2020	2,232		−3.8%
2025 (est.)	2,318	▲	3.9%
U.S. Decennial Census; 1790-1960 1900-1990; 1990-2000 2010 2020

=== Racial and ethnic composition ===
Highland County, Virginia – Racial and ethnic composition Note: the US Census treats Hispanic/Latino as an ethnic category. This table excludes Latinos from the racial categories and assigns them to a separate category. Hispanics/Latinos may be of any race.
Race / Ethnicity (NH = Non-Hispanic)	Pop 1980	Pop 1990	Pop 2000	Pop 2010	Pop 2020	% 1980	% 1990	% 2000	% 2010	% 2020
White alone (NH)	2,901	2,625	2,507	2,284	2,132	98.77%	99.62%	98.86%	98.41%	95.52%
Black or African American alone (NH)	6	3	1	6	2	0.20%	0.11%	0.04%	0.26%	0.09%
Native American or Alaska Native alone (NH)	3	0	3	4	1	0.10%	0.00%	0.12%	0.17%	0.04%
Asian alone (NH)	6	2	3	4	6	0.20%	0.08%	0.12%	0.17%	0.27%
Native Hawaiian or Pacific Islander alone (NH)	x	x	0	0	1	x	x	0.00%	0.00%	0.04%
Other race alone (NH)	1	0	0	0	8	0.03%	0.00%	0.00%	0.00%	0.36%
Mixed race or Multiracial (NH)	x	x	9	5	47	x	x	0.35%	0.22%	2.11%
Hispanic or Latino (any race)	20	5	13	18	35	0.68%	0.19%	0.51%	0.78%	1.57%
Total	2,937	2,635	2,536	2,321	2,232	100.00%	100.00%	100.00%	100.00%	100.00%

=== 2020 census ===
As of the 2020 census, the county had a population of 2,232. The median age was 58.4 years. 14.7% of residents were under the age of 18 and 34.7% of residents were 65 years of age or older. For every 100 females there were 97.7 males, and for every 100 females age 18 and over there were 101.2 males age 18 and over.

The racial makeup of the county was 95.7% White, 0.1% Black or African American, 0.1% American Indian and Alaska Native, 0.3% Asian, 0.0% Native Hawaiian and Pacific Islander, 0.5% from some other race, and 3.3% from two or more races. Hispanic or Latino residents of any race comprised 1.6% of the population.

0.0% of residents lived in urban areas, while 100.0% lived in rural areas.

There were 1,063 households in the county, of which 18.1% had children under the age of 18 living with them and 20.7% had a female householder with no spouse or partner present. About 28.8% of all households were made up of individuals and 16.6% had someone living alone who was 65 years of age or older.

There were 1,787 housing units, of which 40.5% were vacant. Among occupied housing units, 83.1% were owner-occupied and 16.9% were renter-occupied. The homeowner vacancy rate was 3.0% and the rental vacancy rate was 5.6%.

=== 2010 census ===
As of the census of 2010, there were 2,321 people, making it the least populous county in Virginia. The county was the fifth least populous county east of the Mississippi River and the 115th least populous county in the entire United States. There were 1,081 households and 721 families residing in the county. The population density was 5.59 people per square mile (2.16 people/km^{2}). There were 1,837 housing units at an average density of 4.42 units per square mile (1.71 units/km^{2}). The ancestry of the population was 30.5% German, 16.4% American, 14.5% Scotch-Irish, 11.6% Irish, 11.3% English, and 4.8% French. The remainder of the population was split among twelve other different countries of mostly European origin, all of which accounted for less than 100 people each.

There were 1,081 households, out of which 17.0% had children under the age of 18 living with them, 57.4% were married couples living together, 6.1% had a female householder with no husband present, and 33.3% were non-families. 29.0% of all households were made up of individuals, and 14.3% had someone living alone who was 65 years of age or older. The average household size was 2.15 and the average family size was 2.60.

In the county, the population was spread out, with 14.9% under the age of 18, 5.4% from 18 to 24, 16.6% from 25 to 44, 38.2% from 45 to 64, and 24.9% who were 65 years of age or older. The median age was 52.9 years. For every 100 females, there were 99.7 males. For every 100 females age 18 and over, there were 101.5 males.

The median income for a household in the county was $63,636, and the median income for a family was $76,566. Males had a median income of $53,704 versus $41,720 for females. The per capita income for the county was $33,326. About 7.8% of families and 11.1% of the population were below the poverty line, including 14.6% of those under age 18 and 7.9% of those age 65 or over.

The religious makeup of Highland County is composed mainly of Protestant Christian denominations. According to a 2010 study, 60.8% of the population claimed adherence to a religious group. The largest denomination in 2010 was the United Methodist Church with 709 members, or 30.5% of the population, followed by the Presbyterians and non-denominational Christians, each with 219 members or 9.4% of the population. 132 people, or 5.7% of the population were members of the Southern Baptist Convention. The remaining 5.5% of the population adhering to a religious group was composed of the Church of the Brethren, the Church of God of Prophecy, the Episcopal Church, and the Baháʼí Faith, each having less than one hundred members. The United Methodist Church held 50.2% of those claiming adherence to a particular religious organization, the ninth highest such rate for the United Methodist Church among all counties in the United States.

== Government and politics ==
The local government of Highland County consists of a three-member Board of Supervisors who are elected at-large to serve four-year terms. Three magisterial districts divide the county, which are, from west to east, Blue Grass, Monterey, and Stonewall. The Board of Supervisors oversees all "legislative and administrative affairs of the county." A chief administrative officer of the county is selected from the three members of the Board. The Board of Supervisors also appoints a county administrator who handles the implementation of county policies and ordinances. In addition to the Board of Supervisors, other elected members of the county government include the "County Treasurer, the Commissioner of Revenue, the Clerk of the Circuit Court, the Commonwealth Attorney, and the County Sheriff." Monterey, the county seat, is an incorporated town and thus has its own government officials consisting of a town council and a mayor.

Highland County levies a 1% sales tax, a 1.5% personal property tax, a 1% machinery and tools tax, and a .37% real estate tax. 46% of the county's total revenue in 2010 was derived from local taxes, of which 76% was accounted for in property tax levies. The remaining 54% of the county's revenue was from state and federal sources.

Highland County has historically been one of the most consistently reliable strongholds for the Republican Party in national elections, voting for the Republican candidate for U.S. President in every election since 1936. Also, the county has voted for the Republican gubernatorial candidate since 1989. Currently, Highland County is located in Virginia's 6th congressional district which is represented in the U.S. House of Representatives by Republican Ben Cline. The county, along with the rest of the Commonwealth of Virginia, is represented in the U.S. Senate by Democratic Senators Tim Kaine and Mark Warner. Highland County is located in the 2nd Senate of Virginia district represented by Republican Mark D. Obenshain and the 35th House of Delegates district represented by Republican Chris Runion.

The county is a dry county, meaning the "on-premises sale of liquor by the drink" is prohibited. Highland is the northernmost of ten dry counties in Virginia.

Local Officials
Board of Supervisors	County Administrator	County Treasurer	Commissioner of Revenue	Clerk of the Circuit Court	Commonwealth Attorney	Sheriff
David Blanchard, Harry Sponaugle, John Moyers	Roberta Lambert	Lois White	Yvonne Wimer	Judy Hupman	Melissa Dowd	Ronald Wimer

United States presidential election results for Highland County, Virginia
Year	Republican		Democratic		Third party(ies)	
Year	No.	%	No.	%	No.	%
1880	75	10.49%	640	89.51%	0	0.00%
1884	461	47.38%	508	52.21%	4	0.41%
1888	440	48.78%	454	50.33%	8	0.89%
1892	386	38.03%	611	60.20%	18	1.77%
1896	489	46.48%	553	52.57%	10	0.95%
1900	540	50.70%	512	48.08%	13	1.22%
1904	352	52.77%	304	45.58%	11	1.65%
1908	305	49.35%	292	47.25%	21	3.40%
1912	221	34.97%	313	49.53%	98	15.51%
1916	310	45.39%	370	54.17%	3	0.44%
1920	474	55.31%	379	44.22%	4	0.47%
1924	454	46.71%	508	52.26%	10	1.03%
1928	623	62.68%	371	37.32%	0	0.00%
1932	355	42.36%	464	55.37%	19	2.27%
1936	522	50.19%	515	49.52%	3	0.29%
1940	628	53.13%	549	46.45%	5	0.42%
1944	641	54.51%	535	45.49%	0	0.00%
1948	579	53.12%	423	38.81%	88	8.07%
1952	696	62.25%	419	37.48%	3	0.27%
1956	633	58.02%	432	39.60%	26	2.38%
1960	527	56.55%	401	43.03%	4	0.43%
1964	511	51.67%	476	48.13%	2	0.20%
1968	619	57.90%	284	26.57%	166	15.53%
1972	774	77.63%	206	20.66%	17	1.71%
1976	629	55.57%	493	43.55%	10	0.88%
1980	751	58.76%	487	38.11%	40	3.13%
1984	997	70.91%	398	28.31%	11	0.78%
1988	807	62.75%	456	35.46%	23	1.79%
1992	686	49.00%	494	35.29%	220	15.71%
1996	631	51.68%	446	36.53%	144	11.79%
2000	942	65.55%	453	31.52%	42	2.92%
2004	982	64.61%	522	34.34%	16	1.05%
2008	930	59.85%	590	37.97%	34	2.19%
2012	924	65.39%	459	32.48%	30	2.12%
2016	958	68.87%	371	26.67%	62	4.46%
2020	1,092	71.23%	417	27.20%	24	1.57%
2024	1,095	71.34%	416	27.10%	24	1.56%

== Attractions ==
Highland County is known by the nickname "Virginia's Switzerland" or "Virginia's Little Switzerland", in reference to the steep mountains and valleys. The mountains of Highland have historically attracted many tourists to the region, including Henry Ford, Thomas Edison, Harvey Firestone, and other prominent inventors and businessmen who visited the area in 1918.

The Highland County Museum and Heritage Center is located at McDowell and is operated by the Highland Historic Society. Exhibits feature the history of Highland County and the history of the Battle of McDowell during the American Civil War. According to the National Park Service, the battlefield is the best preserved battlefield of all Shenandoah Valley battlefields.

The Highland County Maple Festival has been held annually in March since 1959 to promote the county's maple syrup industry. The festival attracts over 60,000 people annually to the county during the event and has been designated a Local Legacy by the Library of Congress. Highland also hosts a seasonal farmers' market, and the Allegheny Mountain School, an organization to help secure community food systems.

Additionally, other outdoor sports such as fishing, hiking, hunting, caving, and cycling are enjoyed in the county. Every August the Mountain Mama Road Bike Challenge brings cyclists from all over the country to challenge themselves on the steep roads of Highland County. The Highland County fair is the longest continuously running fair in Virginia.

== Communities ==
=== Town ===
- Monterey

=== Census-designated place ===
- McDowell

=== Unincorporated communities ===
- Bethel
- Blue Grass
- Clover Creek
- Doe Hill
- Forks of Waters
- Hardscrabble
- Head Waters
- Hightown
- Liberty
- Meadowdale
- Mill Gap
- Mustoe
- New Hampden
- Palo Alto
- Patna
- Possum Trot
- Sirons Mill
- Trimble
- Vanderpool

== See also ==
- National Register of Historic Places listings in Highland County, Virginia
