= Cowpasture River =

River in Virginia, United States

Coordinates: 37°47′4″N 79°46′33″W

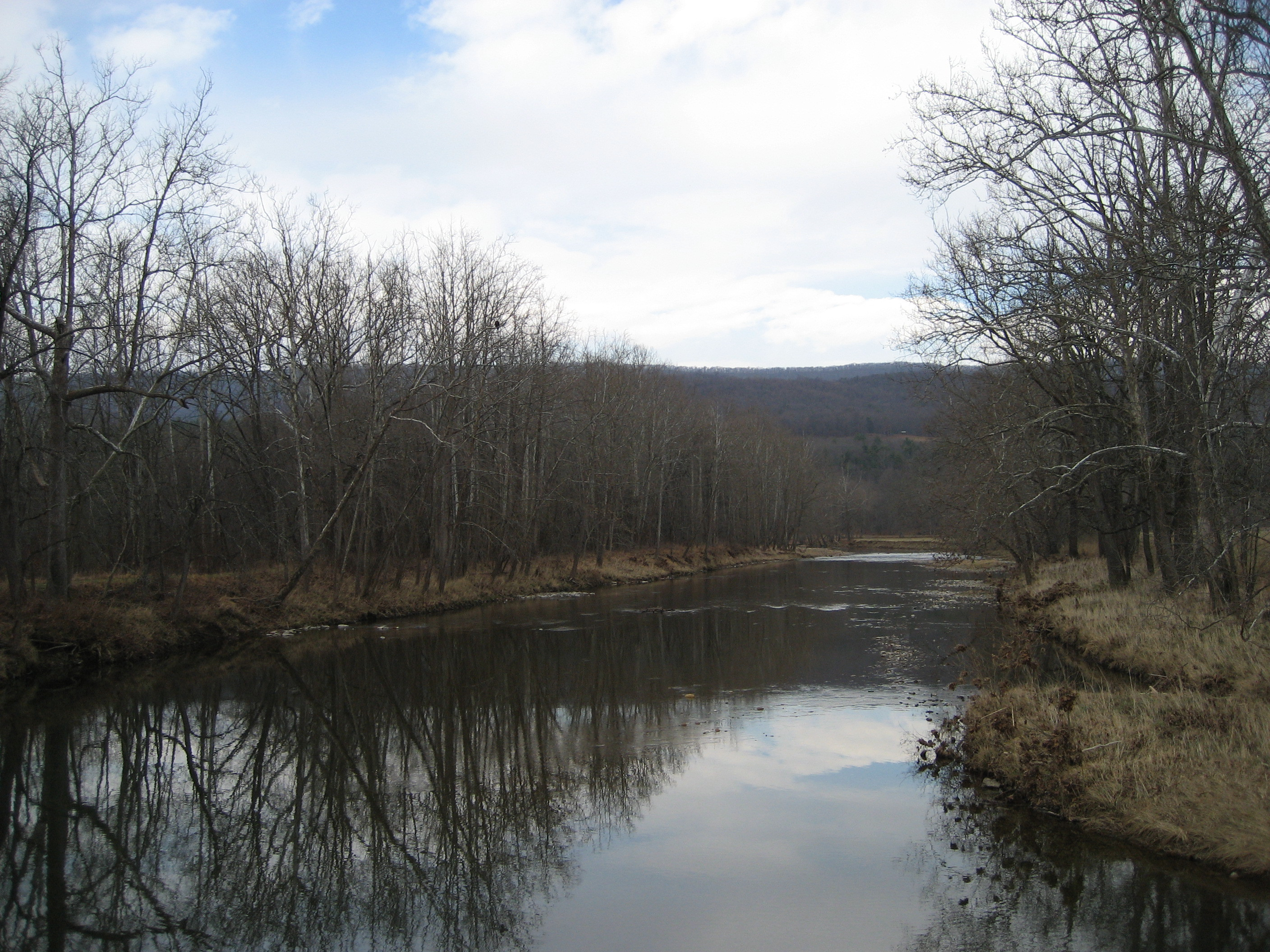

Physical characteristics
- Length: 84.4 miles

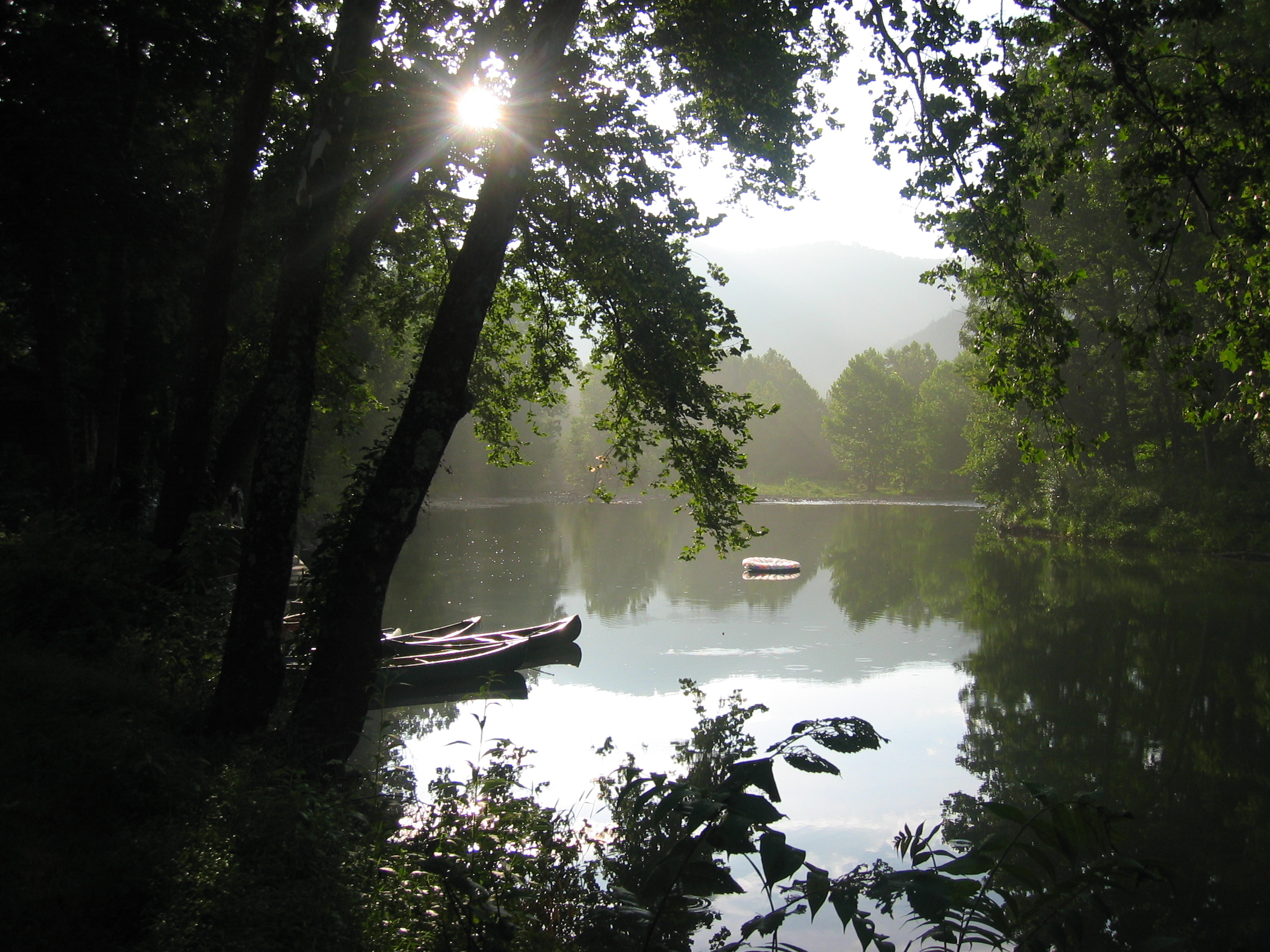
Cowpasture River

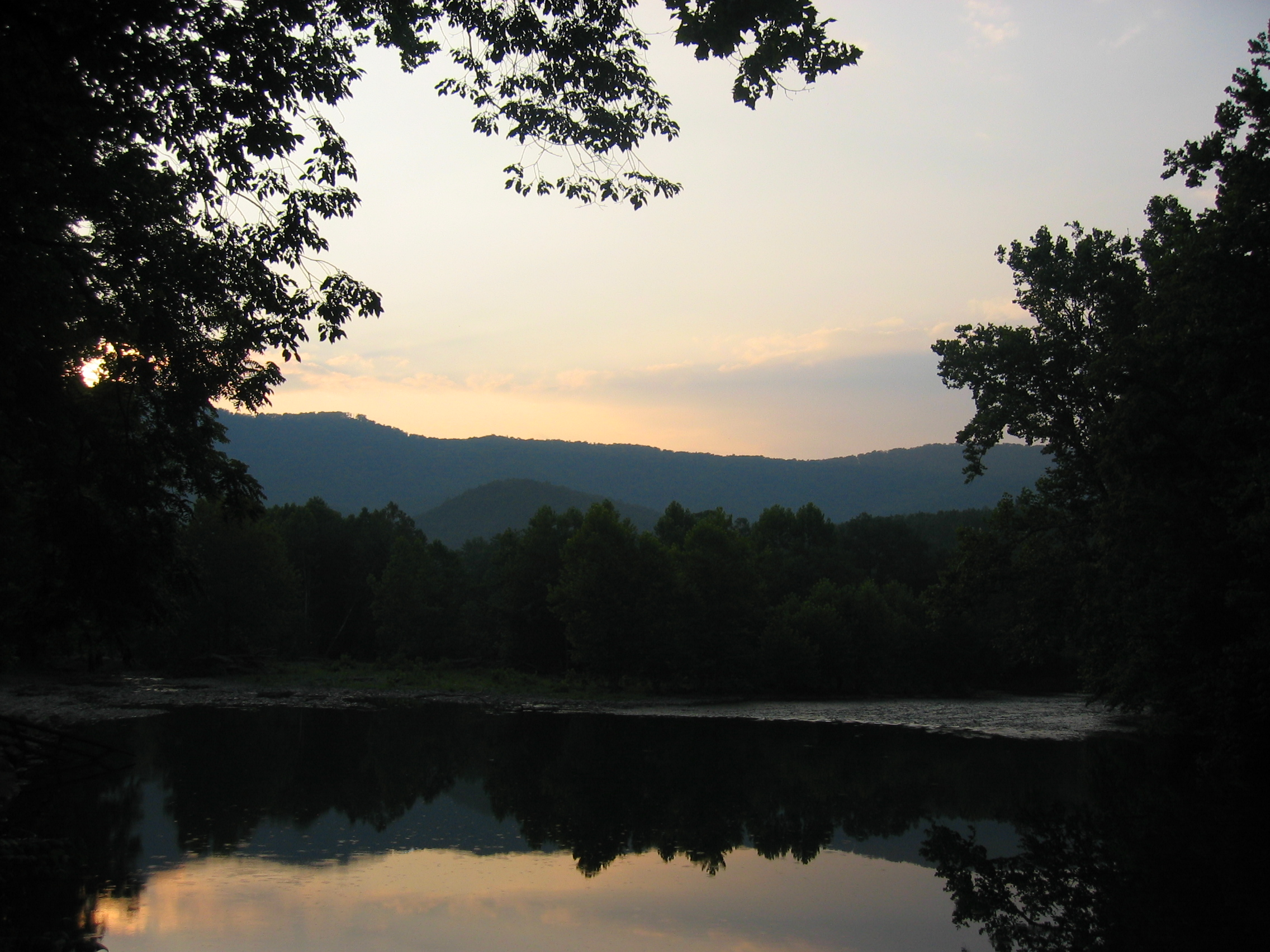
Watts dock, Cowpasture River

The Cowpasture River is a chief tributary of the James River in western Virginia in the United States. It is 84.4 miles (135.8 km) long.

== Course ==
The Cowpasture rises in northeastern Highland County and flows generally southwestwardly, initially between Bullpasture Mountain and Shaws Ridge through a narrow valley floor near the George Washington National Forest. It is joined in eastern Highland County by Shaws Fork and gains breadth but has little depth. At Summers Mountain (a high point along Bullpasture Mountain) the river passes through a narrow gorge before entering a broad valley in Bath County, where at the community of Williamsville it collects the Bullpasture River, which greatly adds to its volume. For 20 miles (32 km) from this confluence the Cowpasture is joined by many small streams, and flows in increasingly wide bends in eastern Bath County. Downstream of the community of Millboro Springs the river becomes deep enough for year-round boating; there are several boat launch sites along the river in Bath County. In eastern Alleghany County the Cowpasture is joined by Simpson Creek and shortly enters Botetourt County, where it joins the Jackson River to form the James River near the town of Iron Gate.

== History ==
Native Americans named the river Walatoola, which means "winding waters", describing the great bends in the river. However, when British settlers arrived in the 1720s they named it the Cowpasture.

There is an interesting story about how the Cowpasture and neighboring rivers the Bullpasture River and Calfpasture River came to be so named. It is said that the Shawnee once had stolen a herd of settlers' cattle and were driving them westward into the mountains. The calves naturally tired first; they were left behind at the river which is now the Calfpasture. The cows were driven on farther, but they, too, had to be abandoned, the valley in which they were left became the valley of the Cowpasture. The bulls, being somewhat hardier, were still able to continue westward; they finally were left at the river which is known as the Bullpasture.

== Topography ==
The Cowpasture flows through valley and ridge topography of shale, limestone, and sandstone. Because of the limestone there are a great number of sinkholes and caves. During extended dry periods the upper courses of the river will entirely dry up and only flow beneath the river bed through the limestone caves.

== Wildlife ==
Because the Cowpasture is bordered by George Washington National Forest, Highland Wildlife Management Area, and several Wilderness Areas, there is an abundance of wildlife. There are many bald eagles which nest along the river, and there are also river otters, which have been reintroduced. With the abundance of wildlife there are also many hunt camps along the river.

== See also ==
- List of Virginia rivers
