= Jackson River (Virginia) =

Jackson River Jacksons River, Jackson's River
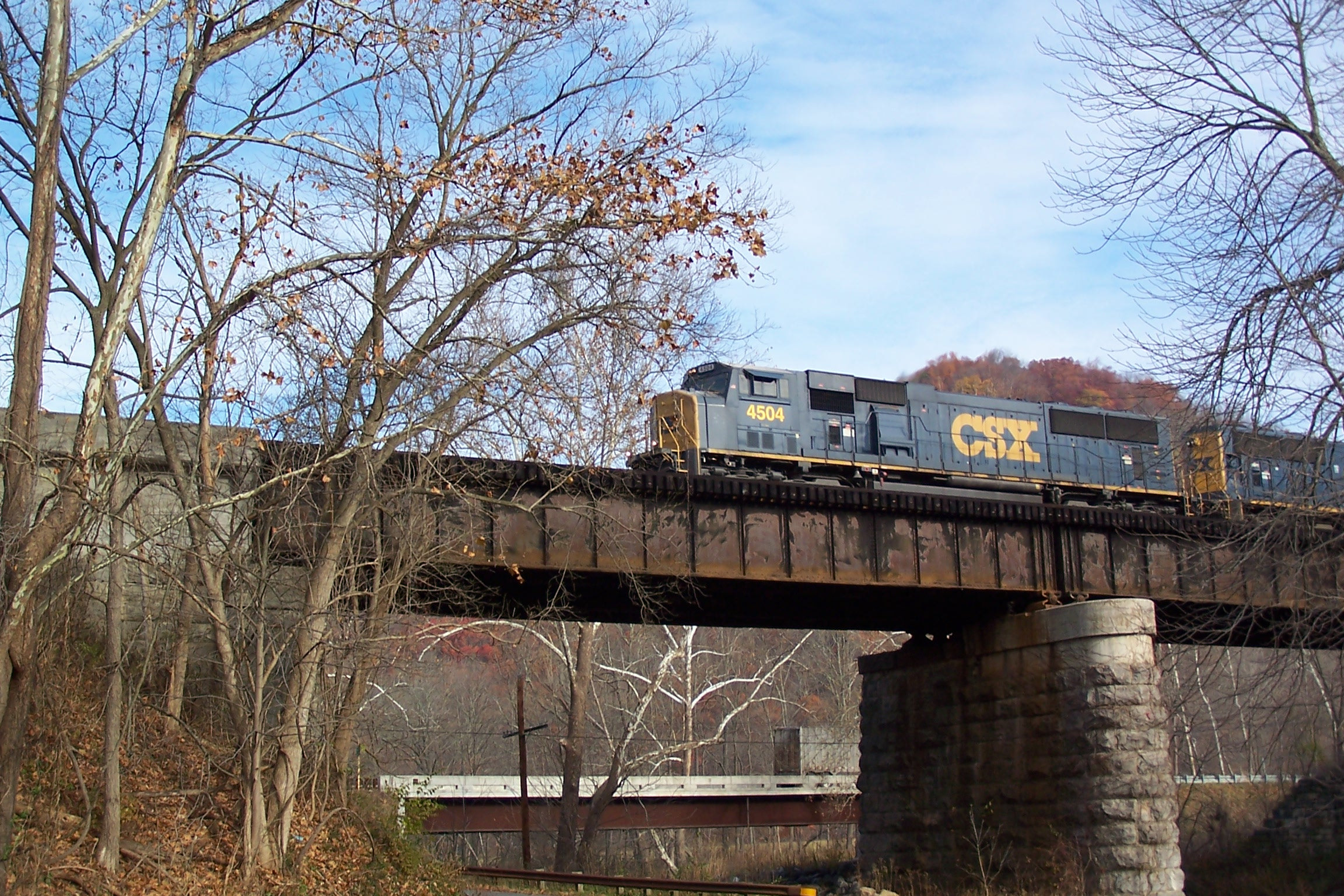
- A CSX freight train crosses the Jackson River near Covington.
- Etymology: William Jackson, the first settler on the river.

Location
- Country: United States
- State: Virginia
- County: Alleghany County, Botetourt County, Bath County, Highland County

Physical characteristics
- Source
  - location: Appalachian Mountains, Highland County, Virginia
  - coordinates: 38°26′7″N 79°38′35″W
- Mouth: James River
  - location: Alleghany County, Virginia
  - coordinates: 37°47′3″N 79°46′33″W
- Length: 96 mi (154 km)

The Jackson River is a major tributary of the James River in the U.S. state of Virginia, flowing 96.4 miles (155.1 km). The James River is formed by the confluence of the Jackson River and the Cowpasture River.

== Course ==
The Jackson River rises in Highland County, Virginia, near the border of West Virginia. It flows south between Back Creek Mountain and Jack Mountain, entering Bath County, where it continues to flow south. The Jackson River is impounded by Gathright Dam in Alleghany County, creating Lake Moomaw. From the dam, Jackson River flows south and then east through Alleghany County, through the city of Covington and the town of Clifton Forge, before joining with the Cowpasture River to create the James River.

The river is named for the first white settler on its banks, William Jackson, who received a grant of 270 acres (1.1 km^{2}) from King George II in 1750. Jackson was possibly an acquaintance of Alexander Dunlap, the first white settler on the Calfpasture River.

== See also ==
- List of Virginia rivers
- Matthew Arbuckle Sr.
