= 2009 Virginia lieutenant gubernatorial election =

- November 3, 2009
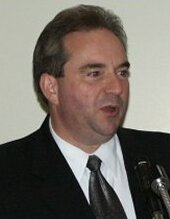

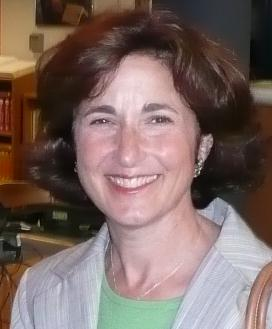
Nominee	Bill Bolling	Jody Wagner
Party	Republican	Democratic
Popular vote	1,106,793	850,111
Percentage	56.5%	43.4%
- Bolling: 50–60% 60–70% 70–80% Wagner: 50–60% 60–70% 70–80% 80–90%
Lieutenant-Governor before election
Bill Bolling
Republican
Elected Lieutenant-Governor
Bill Bolling
Republican

The 2009 Virginia lieutenant gubernatorial election was held on November 3, 2009, to elect the lieutenant governor of Virginia. Incumbent Republican lieutenant governor Bill Bolling successfully ran for reelection to a second term in office, defeating Democrat Jody Wagner. This is the last time a lieutenant governor was re-elected.

== Democratic primary ==
=== Candidates ===
==== Nominee ====
- Jody Wagner, Virginia secretary of finance (2006–2008) and former Virginia state treasurer (2002–2006)

==== Defeated in primary ====
- Michael Signer, national security expert and advisor to Tom Perriello and John Edwards

==== Withdrawn ====
- Jon Bowerbank, member of the Russell County Board of Supervisors (withdrew and endorsed Wagner but appeared on ballot)

=== Polling ===
Source	Date	Jody Wagner	Pat Edmonson	Michael Signer	Rich Savage	Jon Bowerbank	Undecided
Public Policy Polling	June 6–7, 2009	41%	n/a	12%	n/a	6%	42%
Suffolk University	June 4, 2009	30%	n/a	7%	n/a	n/a	62%
Public Policy Polling	May 28–31, 2009	27%	n/a	11%	n/a	n/a	63%
Public Policy Polling	May 19–21, 2009	21%	n/a	11%	n/a	n/a	68%
Public Policy Polling	May 1–3, 2009	18%	n/a	7%	n/a	6%	69%
Public Policy Polling	March 27–29, 2009	21%	4%	4%	n/a	4%	67%
Public Policy Polling	February 28–March 1, 2009	9%	6%	5%	4%	3%	73%

=== Results ===
Democratic primary results
Party	Candidate	Votes	%
Democratic	Jody Wagner	213,059	74.3%
Democratic	Michael Signer	60,979	21.3%
Democratic	Jon Bowerbank	12,739	4.4%
Total votes		286,777	100.00%

== General election ==
=== Candidates ===
- Bill Bolling (Republican), incumbent lieutenant governor (2006–2014)
- Jody Wagner (Democratic), Virginia Secretary of Finance (2006–2008) and Treasurer of Virginia (2002–2006)

=== Results ===
Virginia lieutenant gubernatorial election, 2009
Party	Candidate	Votes	%	±%
Republican	Bill Bolling	1,106,793	56.5%	
Democratic	Jody Wagner	850,111	43.4%	
Write-ins		1,569	0.1%	
Turnout		1,958,473		
Republican hold		Swing	11.9%	
