= 1928 United States presidential election in Virginia =

- November 6, 1928

| Nominee | Herbert Hoover | Al Smith |
| Party | Republican | Democratic |
| Home state | California | New York |
| Running mate | Charles Curtis | Joseph T. Robinson |
| Electoral vote | 12 | 0 |
| Popular vote | 164,609 | 140,146 |
| Percentage | 53.91% | 45.90% |
County and independent city results
Hoover
50–60%
60–70%
70–80%
80–90%
Smith
50–60%
60–70%
70–80%
President before election
Calvin Coolidge
Republican
Elected President
Herbert Hoover
Republican

The 1928 United States presidential election in Virginia took place on November 6, 1928. Voters chose 12 representatives, or electors, to the Electoral College, who voted for president and vice president.

Like all former Confederate States, early twentieth-century Virginia almost completely disenfranchised its black and poor white populations through the use of a cumulative poll tax and literacy tests. So severe was the disenfranchising effect of the new 1902 Constitution that it has been calculated that a third of the electorate during the first half of the twentieth century comprised state employees and officeholders.

This limited electorate meant Virginian politics was controlled by political machines based in Southside Virginia — the 1920s would see the building of the Byrd Organization which would control the state's politics until the Voting Rights Act. Progressive “antiorganization” factions were rendered impotent by the inability of almost all their potential electorate to vote. Unlike the Deep South, historical fusion with the “Readjuster” Democrats, defection over free silver of substantial proportions of the Northeast-aligned white electorate of the Shenandoah Valley and Southwest Virginia, and an early move towards a “lily white” Jim Crow party meant that in general elections the Republicans retained around one-third of the small statewide electorate, with the majority of GOP support located in the western part of the state. However — like in Tennessee during the same era — the parties avoided competition in many areas by an agreed division over local offices.

Virginia was less affected than Oklahoma, Tennessee or North Carolina by the upheavals of World War I and the Nineteenth Amendment, although there was an unsuccessful challenge to lily-white control of the state's Republican Party in 1921. During the 1920 and 1924 national Republican landslides, the party did not equal its performances during the first four “System of 1896” presidential elections. Additionally, in 1927 an effort to reduce the cumulative property of the state's poll tax from three years to two was defeated in committee.

At the beginning of the campaign, prohibitionist Reverend David Hepburn, Superintendent of the Anti-Saloon League of Virginia, predicted a bolt by Virginia, Tennessee and North Carolina due to the religion and Prohibition issues. Governor Byrd would ultimately endorse Smith in August, but the first poll taken in the second week of October had Hoover ahead of Smith by about seven percent. However, around the time of Smith's tour of the state in the middle of the month, when he alleged strong links between the state Republicans and the Ku Klux Klan, other pundits said Smith was sure of carrying Virginia.

At the end of October, the consensus was that Smith would carry the state, but Hoover ultimately gained 53.91 percent of Virginia's vote. This was only the second occasion when Virginia voted for a Republican president, the first being in 1872 during the Reconstruction era. As in all of the former Confederacy, Hoover gained most in the strongly white counties least concerned with black political power, although in the Tidewater and Virginia Peninsula a number of majority-black counties swung unusually strongly against Smith – Charles City County, indeed, gave Hoover two-thirds of its ballots. Unlike Florida, Texas, or Alabama, Virginia's swing to the Republicans also saw the GOP gain three House of Representatives seats, including the home district of Byrd.

== Results ==
1928 United States presidential election in Virginia
| Party | Candidate | Votes | Percentage | Electoral votes |
|---|---|---|---|---|
| Republican | Herbert Hoover | 164,609 | 53.91% | 12 |
| Democratic | Al Smith | 140,146 | 45.90% | 0 |
| Socialist | Norman Thomas | 250 | 0.08% | 0 |
| Socialist Labor | Verne L. Reynolds | 180 | 0.06% | 0 |
| Workers | William Z. Foster | 173 | 0.06% | 0 |
| Totals | | 305,358 | 100.00% | 12 |

=== Results by county ===
1928 United States presidential election in Virginia by counties and independent cities
| County or city | Herbert Hoover Republican | | Al Smith Democratic | | Other candidates Various parties | | Margin | | Total votes cast |
| County or city | # | % | # | % | # | % | # | % | Total votes cast |
|---|---|---|---|---|---|---|---|---|---|
| Accomack County | 1,367 | 42.79% | 1,826 | 57.15% | 2 | 0.06% | -459 | -14.37% | 3,195 |
| Albemarle County | 846 | 34.97% | 1,571 | 64.94% | 2 | 0.08% | -725 | -29.97% | 2,419 |
| Alleghany County | 1,642 | 72.53% | 622 | 27.47% | 0 | 0.00% | 1,020 | 45.05% | 2,264 |
| Amelia County | 277 | 35.70% | 498 | 64.18% | 1 | 0.13% | -221 | -28.48% | 776 |
| Amherst County | 447 | 23.53% | 1,442 | 75.89% | 11 | 0.58% | -995 | -52.37% | 1,900 |
| Appomattox County | 446 | 33.43% | 885 | 66.34% | 3 | 0.22% | -439 | -32.91% | 1,334 |
| Arlington County | 4,274 | 74.41% | 1,444 | 25.14% | 26 | 0.45% | 2,830 | 49.27% | 5,744 |
| Augusta County | 2,679 | 63.82% | 1,507 | 35.90% | 12 | 0.29% | 1,172 | 27.92% | 4,198 |
| Bath County | 731 | 63.90% | 409 | 35.75% | 4 | 0.35% | 322 | 28.15% | 1,144 |
| Bedford County | 1,118 | 43.64% | 1,436 | 56.05% | 8 | 0.31% | -318 | -12.41% | 2,562 |
| Bland County | 826 | 58.92% | 575 | 41.01% | 1 | 0.07% | 251 | 17.90% | 1,402 |
| Botetourt County | 1,575 | 56.70% | 1,200 | 43.20% | 3 | 0.11% | 375 | 13.50% | 2,778 |
| Brunswick County | 245 | 20.98% | 922 | 78.94% | 1 | 0.09% | -677 | -57.96% | 1,168 |
| Buchanan County | 1,333 | 49.24% | 1,365 | 50.42% | 9 | 0.33% | -32 | -1.18% | 2,707 |
| Buckingham County | 579 | 49.15% | 599 | 50.85% | 0 | 0.00% | -20 | -1.70% | 1,178 |
| Campbell County | 801 | 45.10% | 967 | 54.45% | 8 | 0.45% | -166 | -9.35% | 1,776 |
| Caroline County | 638 | 49.84% | 639 | 49.92% | 3 | 0.23% | -1 | -0.08% | 1,280 |
| Carroll County | 2,459 | 68.51% | 1,117 | 31.12% | 13 | 0.36% | 1,342 | 37.39% | 3,589 |
| Charles City County | 207 | 66.35% | 105 | 33.65% | 0 | 0.00% | 102 | 32.69% | 312 |
| Charlotte County | 403 | 26.58% | 1,112 | 73.35% | 1 | 0.07% | -709 | -46.77% | 1,516 |
| Chesterfield County | 1,325 | 54.89% | 1,082 | 44.82% | 7 | 0.29% | 243 | 10.07% | 2,414 |
| Clarke County | 248 | 25.08% | 740 | 74.82% | 1 | 0.10% | -492 | -49.75% | 989 |
| Craig County | 451 | 47.88% | 489 | 51.91% | 2 | 0.21% | -38 | -4.03% | 942 |
| Culpeper County | 753 | 47.36% | 836 | 52.58% | 1 | 0.06% | -83 | -5.22% | 1,590 |
| Cumberland County | 213 | 32.32% | 442 | 67.07% | 4 | 0.61% | -229 | -34.75% | 659 |
| Dickenson County | 1,868 | 49.76% | 1,879 | 50.05% | 7 | 0.19% | -11 | -0.29% | 3,754 |
| Dinwiddie County | 332 | 25.94% | 945 | 73.83% | 3 | 0.23% | -613 | -47.89% | 1,280 |
| Elizabeth City County | 1,122 | 57.78% | 807 | 41.56% | 13 | 0.67% | 315 | 16.22% | 1,942 |
| Essex County | 195 | 37.79% | 321 | 62.21% | 0 | 0.00% | -126 | -24.42% | 516 |
| Fairfax County | 2,507 | 66.98% | 1,229 | 32.83% | 7 | 0.19% | 1,278 | 34.14% | 3,743 |
| Fauquier County | 972 | 38.79% | 1,531 | 61.09% | 3 | 0.12% | -559 | -22.31% | 2,506 |
| Floyd County | 1,481 | 77.34% | 433 | 22.61% | 1 | 0.05% | 1,048 | 54.73% | 1,915 |
| Fluvanna County | 327 | 42.03% | 447 | 57.46% | 4 | 0.51% | -120 | -15.42% | 778 |
| Franklin County | 1,529 | 45.05% | 1,861 | 54.83% | 4 | 0.12% | -332 | -9.78% | 3,394 |
| Frederick County | 1,006 | 46.77% | 1,140 | 53.00% | 5 | 0.23% | -134 | -6.23% | 2,151 |
| Giles County | 1,313 | 50.23% | 1,293 | 49.46% | 8 | 0.31% | 20 | 0.77% | 2,614 |
| Gloucester County | 614 | 51.12% | 587 | 48.88% | 0 | 0.00% | 27 | 2.25% | 1,201 |
| Goochland County | 318 | 42.18% | 431 | 57.16% | 5 | 0.66% | -113 | -14.99% | 754 |
| Grayson County | 2,728 | 61.25% | 1,713 | 38.46% | 13 | 0.29% | 1,015 | 22.79% | 4,454 |
| Greene County | 423 | 61.93% | 259 | 37.92% | 1 | 0.15% | 164 | 24.01% | 683 |
| Greensville County | 318 | 37.90% | 519 | 61.86% | 2 | 0.24% | -201 | -23.96% | 839 |
| Halifax County | 1,091 | 28.37% | 2,742 | 71.31% | 12 | 0.31% | -1,651 | -42.94% | 3,845 |
| Hanover County | 592 | 41.60% | 831 | 58.40% | 0 | 0.00% | -239 | -16.80% | 1,423 |
| Henrico County | 1,887 | 57.87% | 1,349 | 41.37% | 25 | 0.77% | 538 | 16.50% | 3,261 |
| Henry County | 1,139 | 47.28% | 1,267 | 52.59% | 3 | 0.12% | -128 | -5.31% | 2,409 |
| Highland County | 623 | 62.36% | 371 | 37.14% | 5 | 0.50% | 252 | 25.23% | 999 |
| Isle of Wight County | 555 | 51.10% | 531 | 48.90% | 0 | 0.00% | 24 | 2.21% | 1,086 |
| James City County | 204 | 50.12% | 201 | 49.39% | 2 | 0.49% | 3 | 0.74% | 407 |
| King and Queen County | 319 | 52.90% | 280 | 46.43% | 4 | 0.66% | 39 | 6.47% | 603 |
| King George County | 413 | 57.04% | 309 | 42.68% | 2 | 0.28% | 104 | 14.36% | 724 |
| King William County | 329 | 43.06% | 431 | 56.41% | 4 | 0.52% | -102 | -13.35% | 764 |
| Lancaster County | 520 | 62.28% | 315 | 37.72% | 0 | 0.00% | 205 | 24.55% | 835 |
| Lee County | 3,337 | 58.23% | 2,383 | 41.58% | 11 | 0.19% | 954 | 16.65% | 5,731 |
| Loudoun County | 1,325 | 40.84% | 1,915 | 59.03% | 4 | 0.12% | -590 | -18.19% | 3,244 |
| Louisa County | 772 | 51.23% | 734 | 48.71% | 1 | 0.07% | 38 | 2.52% | 1,507 |
| Lunenburg County | 314 | 20.75% | 1,199 | 79.25% | 0 | 0.00% | -885 | -58.49% | 1,513 |
| Madison County | 772 | 56.97% | 580 | 42.80% | 3 | 0.22% | 192 | 14.17% | 1,355 |
| Mathews County | 855 | 66.43% | 431 | 33.49% | 1 | 0.08% | 424 | 32.94% | 1,287 |
| Mecklenburg County | 784 | 30.90% | 1,752 | 69.06% | 1 | 0.04% | -968 | -38.16% | 2,537 |
| Middlesex County | 318 | 44.35% | 397 | 55.37% | 2 | 0.28% | -79 | -11.02% | 717 |
| Montgomery County | 1,861 | 65.64% | 967 | 34.11% | 7 | 0.25% | 894 | 31.53% | 2,835 |
| Nansemond County | 649 | 46.79% | 737 | 53.14% | 1 | 0.07% | -88 | -6.34% | 1,387 |
| Nelson County | 618 | 33.68% | 1,216 | 66.27% | 1 | 0.05% | -598 | -32.59% | 1,835 |
| New Kent County | 217 | 54.66% | 178 | 44.84% | 2 | 0.50% | 39 | 9.82% | 397 |
| Norfolk County | 1,922 | 57.39% | 1,418 | 42.34% | 9 | 0.27% | 504 | 15.05% | 3,349 |
| Northampton County | 688 | 42.39% | 935 | 57.61% | 0 | 0.00% | -247 | -15.22% | 1,623 |
| Northumberland County | 744 | 72.09% | 286 | 27.71% | 2 | 0.19% | 458 | 44.38% | 1,032 |
| Nottoway County | 667 | 40.33% | 986 | 59.61% | 1 | 0.06% | -319 | -19.29% | 1,654 |
| Orange County | 732 | 46.39% | 846 | 53.61% | 0 | 0.00% | -114 | -7.22% | 1,578 |
| Page County | 1,580 | 60.65% | 1,025 | 39.35% | 0 | 0.00% | 555 | 21.31% | 2,605 |
| Patrick County | 1,191 | 57.26% | 883 | 42.45% | 6 | 0.29% | 308 | 14.81% | 2,080 |
| Pittsylvania County | 2,598 | 60.52% | 1,688 | 39.32% | 7 | 0.16% | 910 | 21.20% | 4,293 |
| Powhatan County | 189 | 39.71% | 287 | 60.29% | 0 | 0.00% | -98 | -20.59% | 476 |
| Prince Edward County | 494 | 41.24% | 699 | 58.35% | 5 | 0.42% | -205 | -17.11% | 1,198 |
| Prince George County | 235 | 35.34% | 428 | 64.36% | 2 | 0.30% | -193 | -29.02% | 665 |
| Prince William County | 817 | 49.73% | 826 | 50.27% | 0 | 0.00% | -9 | -0.55% | 1,643 |
| Princess Anne County | 1,040 | 55.23% | 841 | 44.66% | 2 | 0.11% | 199 | 10.57% | 1,883 |
| Pulaski County | 1,998 | 52.32% | 1,821 | 47.68% | 0 | 0.00% | 177 | 4.63% | 3,819 |
| Rappahannock County | 329 | 39.07% | 513 | 60.93% | 0 | 0.00% | -184 | -21.85% | 842 |
| Richmond County | 467 | 61.53% | 292 | 38.47% | 0 | 0.00% | 175 | 23.06% | 759 |
| Roanoke County | 2,675 | 67.53% | 1,284 | 32.42% | 2 | 0.05% | 1,391 | 35.12% | 3,961 |
| Rockbridge County | 1,206 | 47.78% | 1,311 | 51.94% | 7 | 0.28% | -105 | -4.16% | 2,524 |
| Rockingham County | 3,822 | 73.06% | 1,402 | 26.80% | 7 | 0.13% | 2,420 | 46.26% | 5,231 |
| Russell County | 2,006 | 44.38% | 2,511 | 55.55% | 3 | 0.07% | -505 | -11.17% | 4,520 |
| Scott County | 2,916 | 55.28% | 2,355 | 44.64% | 4 | 0.08% | 561 | 10.64% | 5,275 |
| Shenandoah County | 3,420 | 68.01% | 1,589 | 31.60% | 20 | 0.40% | 1,831 | 36.41% | 5,029 |
| Smyth County | 2,751 | 58.53% | 1,937 | 41.21% | 12 | 0.26% | 814 | 17.32% | 4,700 |
| Southampton County | 648 | 43.40% | 844 | 56.53% | 1 | 0.07% | -196 | -13.13% | 1,493 |
| Spotsylvania County | 654 | 59.78% | 439 | 40.13% | 1 | 0.09% | 215 | 19.65% | 1,094 |
| Stafford County | 797 | 64.27% | 441 | 35.56% | 2 | 0.16% | 356 | 28.71% | 1,240 |
| Surry County | 157 | 22.43% | 541 | 77.29% | 2 | 0.29% | -384 | -54.86% | 700 |
| Sussex County | 385 | 41.31% | 547 | 58.69% | 0 | 0.00% | -162 | -17.38% | 932 |
| Tazewell County | 3,072 | 60.65% | 1,979 | 39.07% | 14 | 0.28% | 1,093 | 21.58% | 5,065 |
| Warren County | 564 | 44.20% | 710 | 55.64% | 2 | 0.16% | -146 | -11.44% | 1,276 |
| Warwick County | 465 | 60.78% | 298 | 38.95% | 2 | 0.26% | 167 | 21.83% | 765 |
| Washington County | 3,449 | 56.25% | 2,666 | 43.48% | 17 | 0.28% | 783 | 12.77% | 6,132 |
| Westmoreland County | 554 | 58.50% | 393 | 41.50% | 0 | 0.00% | 161 | 17.00% | 947 |
| Wise County | 4,504 | 49.63% | 4,559 | 50.24% | 12 | 0.13% | -55 | -0.61% | 9,075 |
| Wythe County | 2,540 | 62.56% | 1,516 | 37.34% | 4 | 0.10% | 1,024 | 25.22% | 4,060 |
| York County | 642 | 76.70% | 194 | 23.18% | 1 | 0.12% | 448 | 53.52% | 837 |
| Alexandria City | 1,617 | 55.26% | 1,307 | 44.67% | 2 | 0.07% | 310 | 10.59% | 2,926 |
| Bristol City | 630 | 40.49% | 922 | 59.25% | 4 | 0.26% | -292 | -18.77% | 1,556 |
| Buena Vista City | 267 | 60.68% | 172 | 39.09% | 1 | 0.23% | 95 | 21.59% | 440 |
| Charlottesville City | 708 | 41.57% | 992 | 58.25% | 3 | 0.18% | -284 | -16.68% | 1,703 |
| Clifton Forge City | 781 | 56.92% | 591 | 43.08% | 0 | 0.00% | 190 | 13.85% | 1,372 |
| Danville City | 2,360 | 66.27% | 1,196 | 33.59% | 5 | 0.14% | 1,164 | 32.69% | 3,561 |
| Fredericksburg City | 697 | 53.91% | 594 | 45.94% | 2 | 0.15% | 103 | 7.97% | 1,293 |
| Hampton City | 544 | 46.90% | 615 | 53.02% | 1 | 0.09% | -71 | -6.12% | 1,160 |
| Harrisonburg City | 1,037 | 62.66% | 616 | 37.22% | 2 | 0.12% | 421 | 25.44% | 1,655 |
| Hopewell City | 505 | 51.11% | 482 | 48.79% | 1 | 0.10% | 23 | 2.33% | 988 |
| Lynchburg City | 2,730 | 57.88% | 1,987 | 42.12% | 0 | 0.00% | 743 | 15.75% | 4,717 |
| Newport News City | 3,118 | 61.34% | 1,951 | 38.38% | 14 | 0.28% | 1,167 | 22.96% | 5,083 |
| Norfolk City | 8,392 | 58.65% | 5,888 | 41.15% | 29 | 0.20% | 2,504 | 17.50% | 14,309 |
| Petersburg City | 909 | 39.69% | 1,379 | 60.22% | 2 | 0.09% | -470 | -20.52% | 2,290 |
| Portsmouth City | 3,474 | 57.04% | 2,587 | 42.48% | 29 | 0.48% | 887 | 14.56% | 6,090 |
| Radford City | 524 | 58.29% | 373 | 41.49% | 2 | 0.22% | 151 | 16.80% | 899 |
| Richmond City | 10,767 | 51.20% | 10,213 | 48.57% | 49 | 0.23% | 554 | 2.63% | 21,029 |
| Roanoke City | 6,471 | 61.62% | 4,018 | 38.26% | 12 | 0.11% | 2,453 | 23.36% | 10,501 |
| South Norfolk City | 865 | 84.56% | 158 | 15.44% | 0 | 0.00% | 707 | 69.11% | 1,023 |
| Staunton City | 1,026 | 58.13% | 733 | 41.53% | 6 | 0.34% | 293 | 16.60% | 1,765 |
| Suffolk City | 573 | 47.28% | 637 | 52.56% | 2 | 0.17% | -64 | -5.28% | 1,212 |
| Williamsburg City | 98 | 24.02% | 310 | 75.98% | 0 | 0.00% | -212 | -51.96% | 408 |
| Winchester City | 1,168 | 59.35% | 794 | 40.35% | 6 | 0.30% | 374 | 19.00% | 1,968 |
| Totals | 164,609 | 53.91% | 140,146 | 45.89% | 609 | 0.20% | 24,463 | 8.01% | 305,364 |

== Analysis ==
With all other prominent Democrats sitting the election out, the party nominated Alfred E. Smith, four-term Governor of New York as its nominee for 1928, with little opposition. Smith had been the favorite for the 1924 nomination, but had lost due to opposition to his Catholic faith and "wet" views on Prohibition: he wished to repeal or modify the Volstead Act.

In Virginia – which had little to no experience of the Catholic immigrants from southern and eastern Europe who were Smith's local constituency – Methodist Episcopal Bishop James Cannon Jr., a former ally of Senator Thomas S. Martin, immediately turned sharply against Smith. In 1925, a Catholic, John M. Purcell, who had served a long and loyal apprenticeship in the state party, was nominated by the Democratic Party for state treasurer and won the general election by fewer than twenty-six thousand votes while Harry F. Byrd was winning the governorship by almost seventy thousand.

Many prohibitionists in Virginia quickly felt that it would be preferable to vote for the dry Republican nominee, former United States Secretary of Commerce Herbert Hoover, over the wet Catholic Democrat Smith. Senator Claude A. Swanson was the first major state politician to oppose Smith, announcing his opposition on June 22. However, most major newspapers, such as the Staunton News-Leader and Daily-News, Lynchburg News, Winchester Evening-Star and The Free-Lance Star, would endorse Smith from early in the campaign.

Despite Smith's attempt to mollify the South by nominating dry Southern Democrat and Arkansas Senator Joseph Taylor Robinson as his running mate early in July, Cannon would step up his campaign against Smith during that month via a widely publicised speech in Asheville. At the beginning of the campaign, however, the Republican National Convention largely wrote off Virginia and campaigned elsewhere in the former Confederacy; however, former Ninth District Congressman Campbell Bascom Slemp thought Hoover had a chance and worked strenuously to build support in the state.

According to one analysis of the Virginia 1928 presidential election:

The voting of 1928 was not so much pro-Hoover as it was anti-Smith. Smith was defeated for reasons that no platform could touch – his Roman Catholicism and immigrant, urban background.
