= McGuireWoods =

American law firm

McGuireWoods LLP
- Headquarters: Richmond, Virginia
- No. of offices: 21
- No. of attorneys: 1000+
- Major practice areas: General practice
- Key people: Tracy Walker, Managing partner
- Date founded: 1834; 192 years ago
- Founder: Egbert R. Watson
- Company type: Limited liability partnership
- Website: mcguirewoods.com

McGuireWoods LLP is a US-based international law firm headquartered in Richmond, Virginia. Initially founded in 1834, the firm has grown into the largest law firm in the state of Virginia, and has 21 offices across the United States. Along with its Richmond headquarters, the firm's largest offices are located in Chicago, Illinois and Charlotte, North Carolina.

== History ==
=== 1800s–1999 ===
McGuireWoods traces its origins to two lawyers, Egbert R. Watson and Murray Mason McGuire. In 1834, Watson opened a law office in Charlottesville, Virginia. In 1870, he formed a partnership with his son-in-law, George Perkins, that would become Perkins, Battle & Minor.

In 1897, McGuire started practicing law in Richmond, Virginia. He was joined by John Stewart Bryan in 1898 and the two formed McGuire & Bryan. In the 1960s, the firm became McGuire, Woods, King, Davis & Patterson.

In 1966, Charlottesville's Battle, Neal, Harris, Minor & Williams merged with Richmond's McGuire, Woods, King, Davis & Patterson to create McGuire, Woods & Battle.

In 1987, the firm merged with Boothe, Prichard & Dudley, a 75-lawyer firm located in Tysons, Virginia, to create McGuire, Woods, Battle & Boothe. The newly-merged firm became the 33rd largest in the United States at the time. In 1991, McGuire, Woods, Battle & Boothe merged with Cable, McDaniel, Bowie & Bond, a Baltimore-based law firm.

In 1998, the firm established its affiliate McGuireWoods Consulting to provide services to government and in public relations.

=== 2000–present ===
After a series of mergers in the early 2000s, including with Ross and Hardies (2003), Gordon & Glickson (2006), and Helms Mullis & Wicker (2008), the firm rebranded as McGuireWoods.

In 2009, McGuireWoods opened a London office after a merger with Grundberg Mocatta Rakison.

In 2014, McGuireWoods opened its Dallas, Texas office. In 2015, the firm entered into an alliance with FuJae Partners, a Shanghai-based law firm and opened a second office in Los Angeles. In 2016, the firm opened an office in San Francisco. As of 2019, the firm has 21 offices worldwide.

In December 2017, Richard Cullen stepped down as chairman of McGuireWoods and partner Jonathan Harmon became the firm's new chairman. In 2019, Richard Davis was hired as the new chief operating officer.

In June 2020, the Open Technology Fund (OTF) asked McGuireWoods, which had been advising it pro bono, for help in a conflict with the U.S. Agency for Global Media (USAGM) and its then-director Michael Pack. McGuireWoods advised it could not help in the case. OTF learned in December 2020 that the reason for the refusal was that McGuireWoods had decided to investigate OTF on behalf of USAGM and Pack instead. The Government Accountability Project, citing records obtained via the Freedom of Information Act, claimed McGuireWoods had billed USAGM $1.625 million at an average rate of $320 an hour after receiving a no-bid contract to investigate OTF as well as Voice of America employees.

In 2022, Donald Trump's Save America political action committee paid McGuireWoods close to $900,000 in legal fees.

In 2025, McGuireWoods appointed three former U.S. Attorneys with firm histories, among four new managing partners, including Ryan K. Buchanan from the Northern District of Georgia; Michael F. Easley Jr. from the Eastern District of North Carolina; and Eric G. Olshan from the Western District of Pennsylvania.

== Notable cases ==
- In June 2017, Vice President Mike Pence retained Richard Cullen, then-chairman of McGuireWoods, as outside legal counsel related to the special counsel investigation into Russian efforts to interfere with the 2016 election.
- In May 2018, Elizabeth Hutson led the McGuireWoods team that represented human trafficking survivor Kendra Ross. Ross was awarded an almost $8 million judgment, the largest civil single-plaintiff human trafficking award in U.S. history, in the suit she brought against the nationwide regimented cult The Value Creators Inc. (formerly known as The United Nation of Islam).
- McGuireWoods attorneys including Richard Cullen represented Cynthia and Frederick Warmbier when they sued North Korea for having tortured and murdered their son, Otto Warmbier. In December 2018, a federal court ordered North Korea to pay the Warmbiers over $500 million.
- In 2018, McGuireWoods attorney Matthew Fitzgerald represented Ryan Collins in the U.S. Supreme Court case Collins v. Virginia. The Court voted in favor of Collins, ruling that the automobile exception to the Fourth Amendment does not permit a police officer to enter the curtilage of a home without a warrant.
- McGuireWoods lawyers were part of the defense team hired to represent Boeing in a federal criminal investigation related to the 737 MAX aircraft. In January 2021, Boeing entered into a deferred prosecution agreement with the U.S. Department of Justice.
- McGuireWoods represented mining company Asarco LLC in litigation related to the ongoing cleanup of a former lead and zinc smelting site in western Montana. In May 2021, U.S. District Judge Dana Christensen ruled that Atlantic Richfield Co. must pay Asarco $16 million and 25 percent of future sums to contribute to ongoing cleanup.

== McGuireWoods alumni ==
- George Allen, former U.S. Senator from Virginia
- Richard Cullen, former Attorney General of Virginia and current counselor to Virginia Governor Glenn Youngkin
- William C. Battle, former U.S. Ambassador to Australia
- Cheri Beasley, former Chief Justice of the North Carolina Supreme Court and 2022 United States Senate candidate
- Ken Bell, U.S. District Judge for the Western District of North Carolina
- John N. Dalton, former Governor of Virginia
- Mark Steven Davis, Chief Judge Eastern District of Virginia.
- Frank Donatelli, political consultant
- Michael F. Easley Jr., U.S. Attorney for the Eastern District of North Carolina
- Timothy Flanigan, former White House Deputy Counsel
- Leroy R. Hassell Sr., former Chief Justice of Virginia
- Jack McLean, former mayor of Tallahassee, Florida
- Carlos Muñiz, Justice of the Florida Supreme Court
- Robert H. Patterson Jr., attorney and political operative
- Lewis F. Payne Jr., former member of the U.S. House of Representatives
- Robert E. Payne, Senior Judge of the United States District Court for the Eastern District of Virginia
- Jacob Rooksby, dean of the University of Richmond School of Law
- David L. Richardson, Treasurer of Virginia
- George Terwilliger, former U.S. Deputy Attorney General
- Paul Van den Bulck, former president of Royal Belgian Football Association
- Richard Leroy Williams, former Senior Judge of the United States District Court for the Eastern District of Virginia

== Notable current attorneys and consultants ==
=== Attorneys ===
- John Donley Adams, Republican nominee for Attorney General of Virginia in the 2017 election
- Scott Becker, partner in the firm's healthcare department; founder and publisher of Becker's Hospital Review
- Andrew G. McBride, former Assistant United States Attorney for the Eastern District of Virginia
- Bernard McNamee, former Commissioner of the Federal Energy Regulatory Commission
- Jim Hodges, former Governor of South Carolina
- Robert J. Bittman, partner at the firm and lawyer for Mark Meadows in the Georgia election racketeering prosecution
- Ryan Y. Park, former Solicitor General of North Carolina and Fourth Circuit nominee.

=== McGuireWoods Consulting (MWC) ===
- Laura Fornash, former Virginia Secretary of Education
- Preston Bryant, former member of the Virginia House of Delegates and served as Virginia Secretary of Natural Resources
- William J. Howell, former Speaker of the Virginia House of Delegates
- G.K. Butterfield, former Member of the U.S House of Representatives

== Recognition ==
McGuireWoods was named one of the most innovative law firms in North America by Financial Times in 2018 and 2019.

== See also ==
- List of law firms globally
