= 2000 United States House of Representatives elections in Virginia =

- November 7, 2000

All 11 Virginia seats to the United States House of Representatives
	Majority party	Minority party	Third party
Party	Republican	Democratic	Independent
Last election	5	6	0
Seats before	5	5	1
Seats won	6	4	1
Seat change	▲1	▼1	Steady
Popular vote	1,131,999	1,060,484	229,246
Percentage	46.74%	43.79%	9.47%
Swing	▼0.46%	▼0.99%	▲1.44%

Republican
40–50%
50–60%
60–70%
70–80%
80–90%
90–100%
Democratic
40–50%
50–60%
60–70%
70–80%
80–90%
90–100%
Independent
50–60%
60–70%
70–80%
80–90%

The 2000 United States House of Representatives elections in Virginia were held on November 7, 2000 to determine who will represent the Commonwealth of Virginia in the United States House of Representatives. Virginia has eleven seats in the House, apportioned according to the 1990 United States census. Representatives are elected for two-year terms.

== Overview ==
United States House of Representatives elections in Virginia, 2000
Party	Votes	Percentage	Seats	+/–
Republican	1,131,999	46.74%	6	+1
Democratic	1,060,484	43.79%	4	-2
Independents/Write-ins	229,246	9.47%	1	+1
Totals	2,421,729	100.00%	11	—

== District 1 ==
2000 Virginia's 1st congressional district election
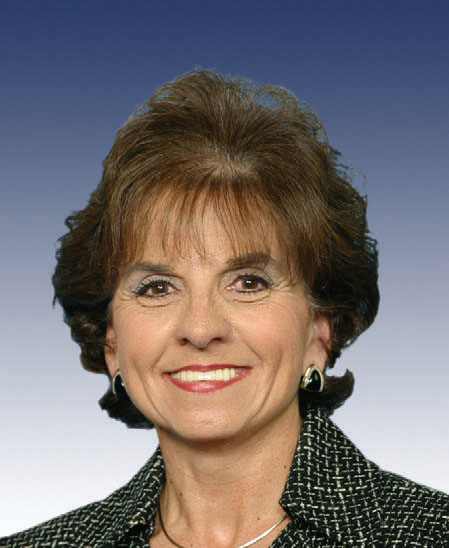

Candidate	Jo Ann Davis	Lawrence A. Davis
Party	Republican	Democratic
Popular vote	151,344	97,399
Percentage	57.5%	37.0%
- County and independent city results A. Davis: 40–50% 50–60% 60–70% 70–80% L. Davis: 40–50% 50–60%
U.S. Representative before election
Herb Bateman
Republican
Elected U.S. Representative
Jo Ann Davis
Republican

Incumbent Representative Herb Bateman retired due to health concerns, dying that September. Republican Jo Ann Davis won the open seat.

Virginia's 1st congressional district election, 2000
Party	Candidate	Votes	%
Republican	Jo Ann Davis	151,344	57.50
Democratic	Lawrence A. Davis	97,399	37.00
Independent	Sharon A. Wood	9,652	3.70
Independent	Josh Billings	4,082	1.60
	Write-ins	537	0.20
Total votes		263,014	100.00
Republican hold			

== District 2 ==
2000 Virginia's 2nd congressional district election
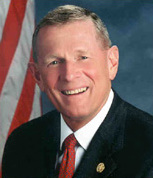

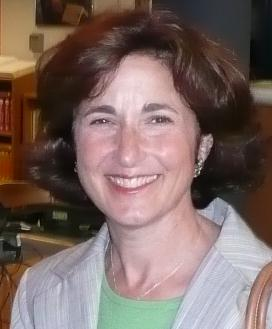
Candidate	Edward L. Schrock	Jody M. Wagner
Party	Republican	Democratic
Popular vote	97,856	90,328
Percentage	52.0%	47.9%
U.S. Representative before election
Owen B. Pickett
Democratic
Elected U.S. Representative
Edward L. Schrock
Republican

Virginia's 2nd congressional district election, 2000
Party	Candidate	Votes	%
Republican	Edward L. Schrock	97,856	52.00
Democratic	Jody M. Wagner	90,328	47.90
	Write-ins	145	0.10
Total votes		188,329	100.00
Republican gain from Democratic			

== District 3 ==
2000 Virginia's 3rd congressional district election
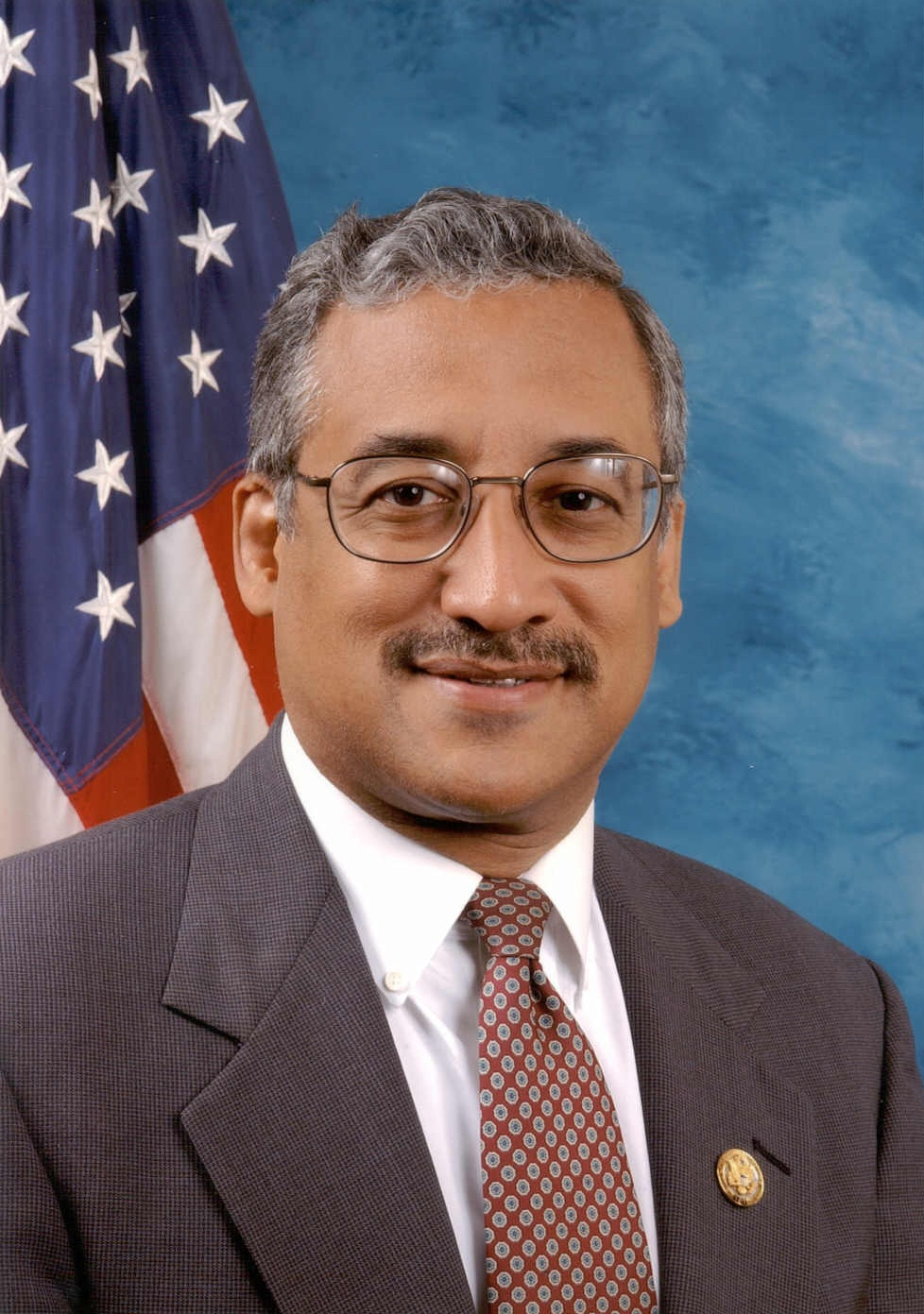
Candidate	Robert C. Scott
Party	Democratic
Popular vote	137,527
Percentage	97.7%
U.S. Representative before election
Robert C. Scott
Democratic
Elected U.S. Representative
Robert C. Scott
Democratic

Virginia's 3rd congressional district election, 2000
Party	Candidate	Votes	%
Democratic	Robert C. Scott (inc.)	137,527	97.70
	Write-ins	3,226	2.30
Total votes		140,753	100.00
Democratic hold			

== District 4 ==
2000 Virginia's 4th congressional district election
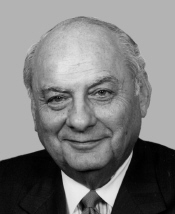
Candidate	Norman Sisisky
Party	Democratic
Popular vote	189,787
Percentage	98.9%
U.S. Representative before election
Norman Sisisky
Democratic
Elected U.S. Representative
Norman Sisisky
Democratic

Virginia's 4th congressional district election, 2000
Party	Candidate	Votes	%
Democratic	Norman Sisisky (inc.)	189,787	98.90
	Write-ins	2,108	1.10
Total votes		191,895	100.00
Democratic hold			

== District 5 ==
2000 Virginia's 5th congressional district election
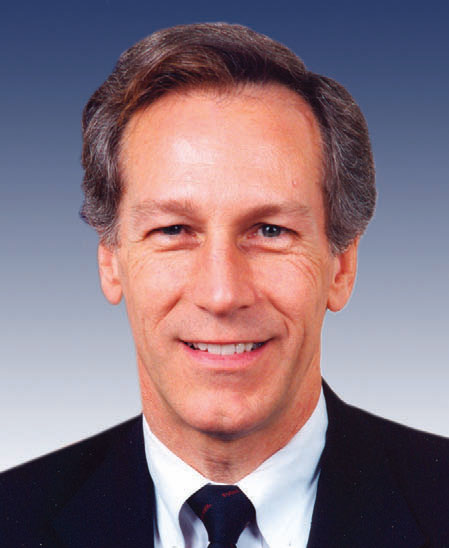

Candidate	Virgil Goode	John W. Boyd, Jr.
Party	Independent	Democratic
Popular vote	143,312	65,387
Percentage	67.4%	30.7%
- County and independent city results Goode: 50–60% 60–70% 70–80% 80–90% Boyd Jr.: 50–60%
U.S. Representative before election
Virgil Goode
Independent
Elected U.S. Representative
Virgil Goode
Independent

Incumbent Representative Virgil Goode ran for re-election as an independent, switching from the Democratic Party.

Virginia's 5th congressional district election, 2000
Party	Candidate	Votes	%
Independent	Virgil Goode (inc.)	143,312	67.38
Democratic	John W. Boyd, Jr.	65,387	30.74
Independent	Joseph S. Spence	3,936	1.85
Independent	Others	70	0.03
Total votes		150,233	100.00
Independent gain from Democratic			

== District 6 ==
2000 Virginia's 6th congressional district election
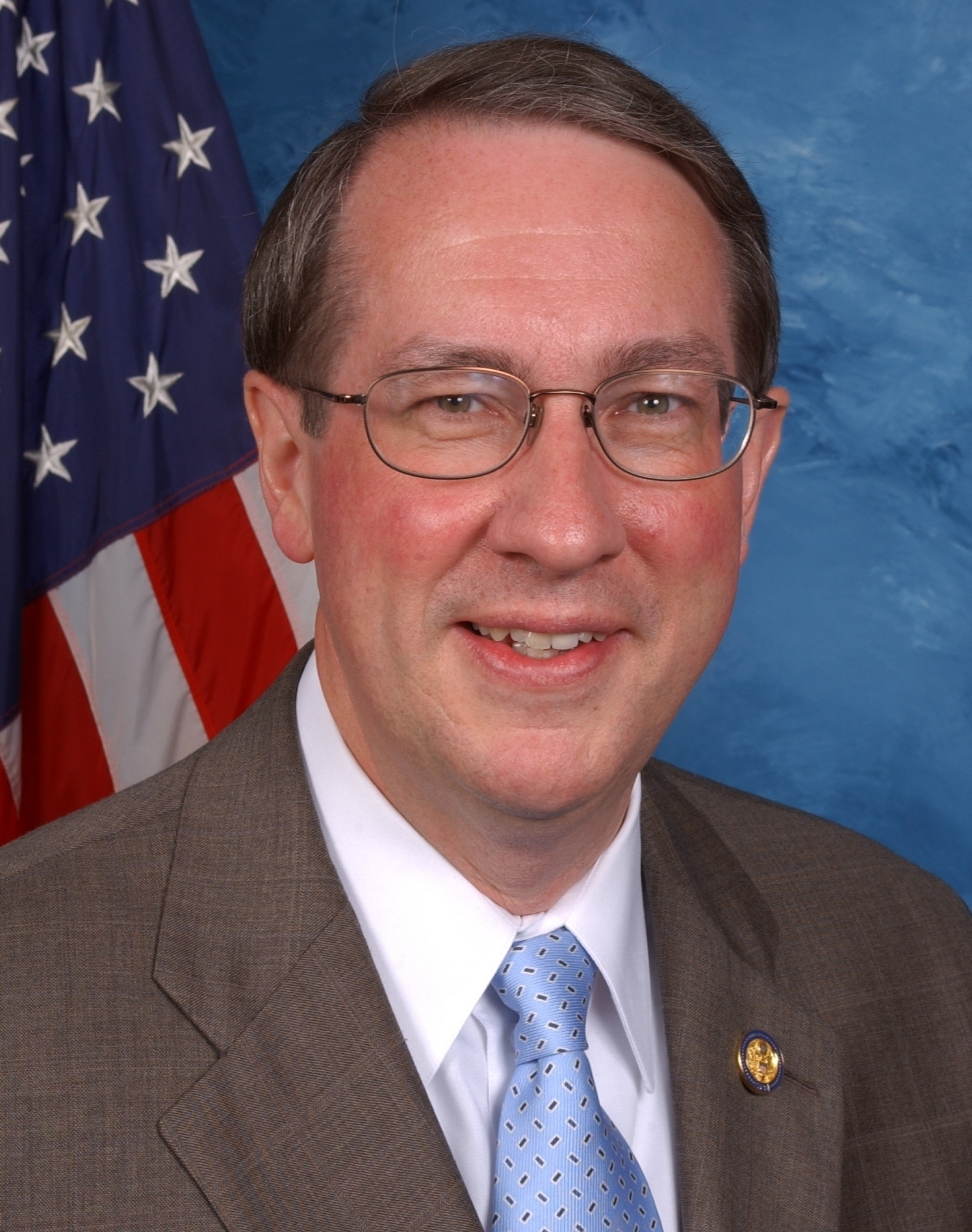
Candidate	Bob Goodlatte
Party	Republican
Popular vote	153,338
Percentage	99.3%
U.S. Representative before election
Bob Goodlatte
Republican
Elected U.S. Representative
Bob Goodlatte
Republican

Virginia's 6th congressional district election, 2000
Party	Candidate	Votes	%
Republican	Bob Goodlatte (inc.)	153,338	99.30
	Write-ins	1,145	0.70
Total votes		154,483	100.00
Republican hold			

== District 7 ==
2000 Virginia's 7th congressional district election
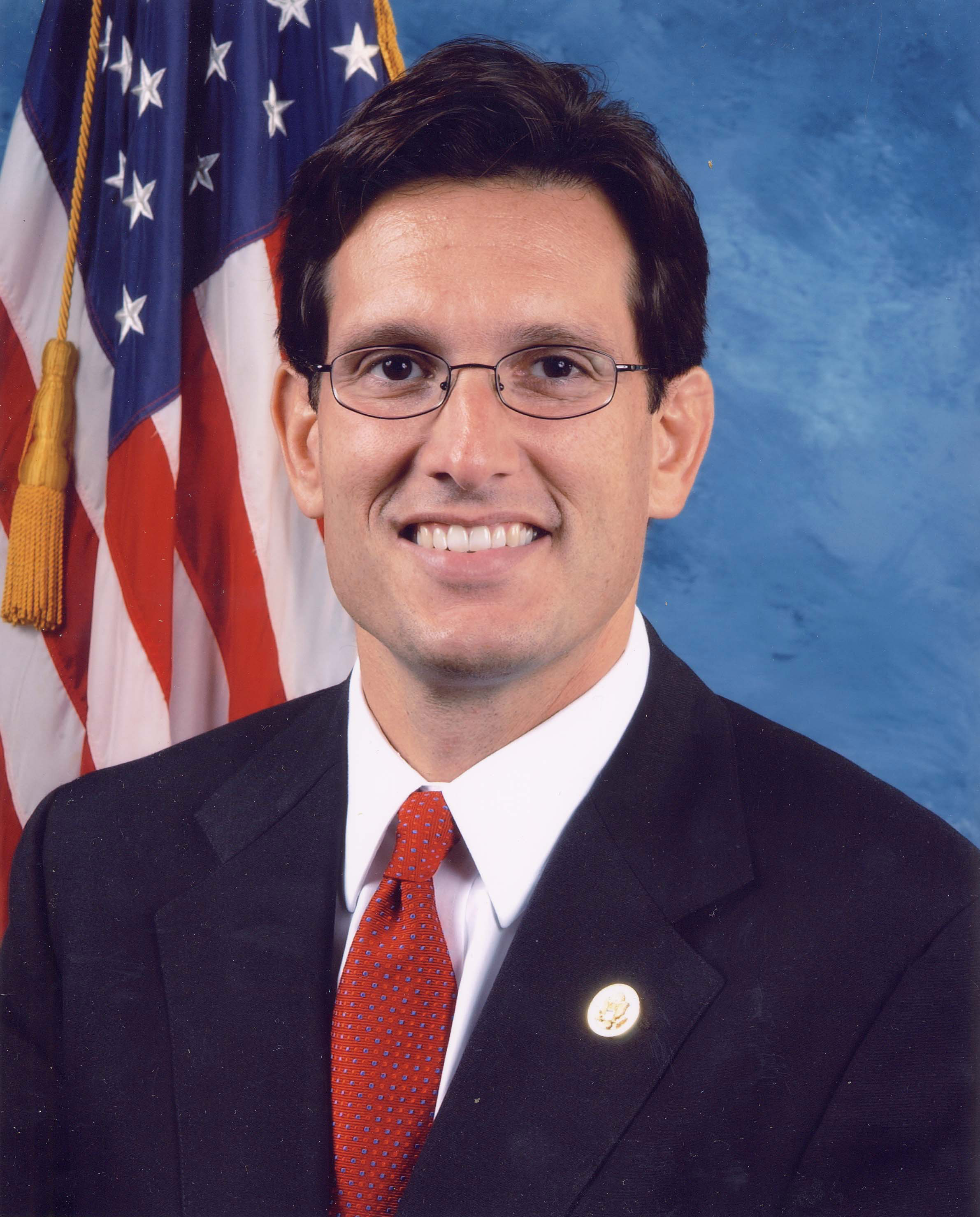

Candidate	Eric Cantor	Warren Stewart
Party	Republican	Democratic
Popular vote	192,652	94,935
Percentage	66.9%	33.0%
- County and independent city results Cantor: 50–60% 60–70% 70–80%
U.S. Representative before election
Thomas J. Bliley Jr.
Republican
Elected U.S. Representative
Eric Cantor
Republican

Incumbent Representative Thomas J. Bliley Jr. retired. Republican Eric Cantor won the open seat.

Virginia's 7th congressional district election, 2000
Party	Candidate	Votes	%
Republican	Eric Cantor	192,652	66.90
Democratic	Warren A. Stewart	94,935	33.00
	Write-ins	304	0.10
Total votes		287,891	100.00
Republican hold			

== District 8 ==
2000 Virginia's 8th congressional district election
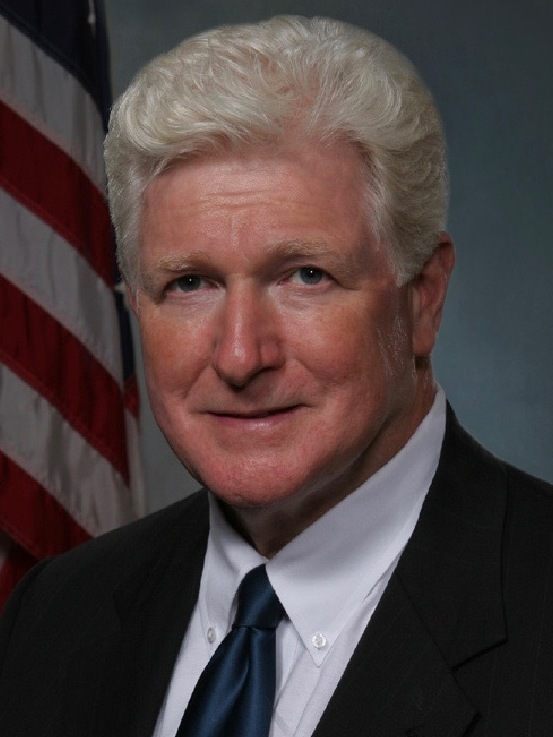

Candidate	Jim Moran	Demaris H. Miller
Party	Democratic	Republican
Popular vote	164,178	88,262
Percentage	63.3%	34.1%
- County results Moran: 50–60% 60–70%
U.S. Representative before election
Jim Moran
Democratic
Elected U.S. Representative
Jim Moran
Democratic

Virginia's 8th congressional district election, 2000
Party	Candidate	Votes	%
Democratic	Jim Moran (inc.)	164,178	63.30
Republican	Demaris H. Miller	88,262	34.10
Independent politician	Ronald Crickenberger	3,483	1.10
Independent politician	Richard Herron	2,805	1.30
	Write-ins	471	0.20
Total votes		263,014	100.00
Democratic hold			

== District 9 ==
2000 Virginia's 9th congressional district election
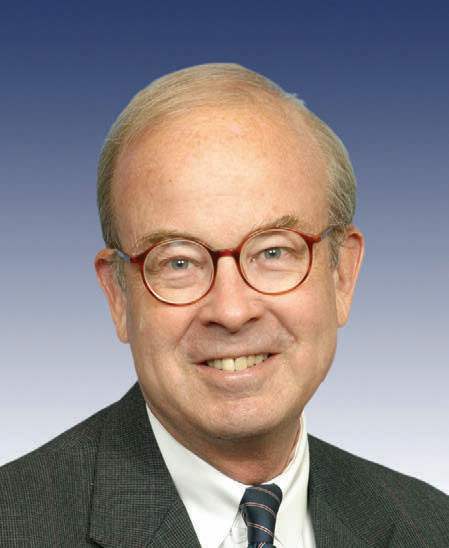

Candidate	Rick Boucher	Michael Osborne
Party	Democratic	Republican
Popular vote	137,488	59,335
Percentage	69.8%	30.1%
- County and independent city results Boucher: 50–60% 60–70% 70–80% 80–90%
U.S. Representative before election
Rick Boucher
Democratic
Elected U.S. Representative
Rick Boucher
Democratic

Virginia's 9th congressional district election, 2000
Party	Candidate	Votes	%
Democratic	Rick Boucher (inc.)	137,488	69.80
Republican	Michael Osborne	59,335	30.1
	Write-ins	32	0.10
Total votes		196,855	100.00
Democratic hold			

== District 10 ==
2000 Virginia's 10th congressional district election
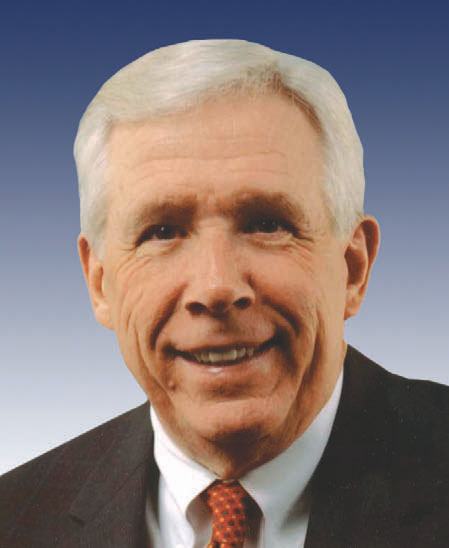

Candidate	Frank Wolf	Brian Brown	Marc Rossi
Party	Republican	Independent	Independent
Popular vote	238,817	28,107	16,031
Percentage	84.2%	9.9%	5.7%
- County and independent city results Wolf: 70–80% 80–90%
U.S. Representative before election
Frank Wolf
Republican
Elected U.S. Representative
Frank Wolf
Republican

Incumbent Republican Representative Frank Wolf ran for re-election. No Democrat filed to run, but two Independent candidates appeared on the ballot. Wolf won in a landslide, winning over 80% of the vote.

Virginia's 10th congressional district election, 2000
Party	Candidate	Votes	%
Republican	Frank Wolf (inc.)	238,817	84.20
Independent politician	Brian Brown	28,107	9.90
Independent politician	Marc Rossi	16,031	5.70
	Write-ins	682	0.20
Total votes		283,637	100.00
Republican hold			

== District 11 ==
2000 Virginia's 11th congressional district election
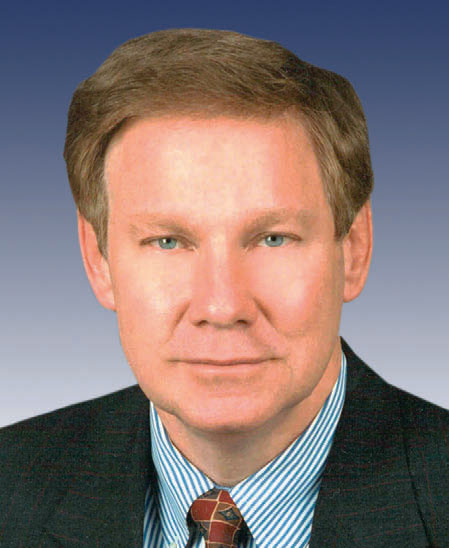

Candidate	Tom Davis	M.L. Corrigan
Party	Republican	Democratic
Popular vote	150,395	83,455
Percentage	61.9%	34.3%
- County and independent city results Davis: 50–60% 60–70%
U.S. Representative before election
Tom Davis
Republican
Elected U.S. Representative
Tom Davis
Republican

Incumbent Republican Representative Tom Davis ran for re-election. Davis defeated Democrat M.L. Corrigan with over 60% of the vote.

Virginia's 11th congressional district election, 2000
Party	Candidate	Votes	%
Republican	Tom Davis (inc.)	150,395	61.90
Democratic	M.L. Corrigan	83,455	34.30
Independent	Robert K. McBridge	4,774	2.00
Independent	C.W. Levy	4,059	1.70
	Write-ins	285	0.10
Total votes		242,968	100.00
Republican hold			

== See also ==
- 2000 United States House of Representatives elections
