= John W. Forbes II =

10th Virginia Secretary of Finance
- In office May 31, 2001 – January 12, 2002
- Governor: Jim Gilmore
- Preceded by: Ronald L. Tillett
- Succeeded by: John M. Bennett

Personal details
- Born: John Wesley Forbes II; August 24, 1956 (age 68); Norfolk, Virginia, U.S.
- Political party: Republican
- Education: Old Dominion University; State University of New York

John Wesley Forbes II (born August 24, 1956) is an American government official who served as Virginia Secretary of Finance in the cabinet of Republican Jim Gilmore. He was sentenced to 10 years in federal prison in 2010 for embezzling from the Virginia Tobacco Indemnification and Community Revitalization Commission.
