= Asher W. Harman Jr. =

American politician (1850–1917)

A. W. Harman, Jr.
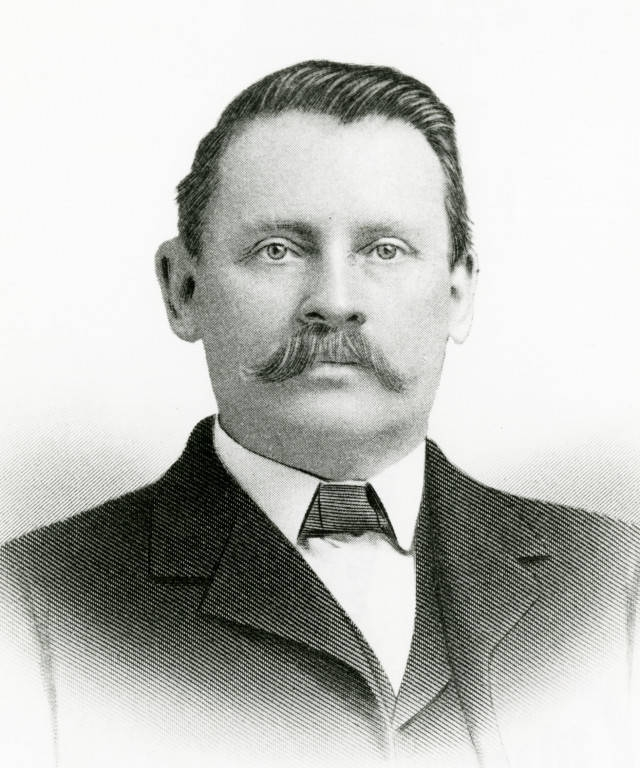

Treasurer of Virginia
- In office January 2, 1886 – April 11, 1917
- Governor: Fitzhugh Lee; Philip W. McKinney; Charles T. O'Ferrall; James H. Tyler; Andrew J. Montague; Claude A. Swanson; William H. Mann; Henry C. Stuart
- Preceded by: Isaac R. Barksdale
- Succeeded by: Clarence H. Urner

Personal details
- Born: Asher Waterman Harman, Jr. September 6, 1850 Staunton, Virginia, U.S.
- Died: April 11, 1917 (aged 66) Richmond, Virginia, U.S.
- Party: Democratic
- Spouse: Eugenia Martha Cameron
- Education: Virginia Military Institute

Asher Waterman Harman, Jr. (September 6, 1850 – April 11, 1917) was the Treasurer of Virginia for a period of thirty-one years. Originally appointed by the General Assembly, Treasurer became an elected office under the state's 1902 Constitution; he was elected as a Democrat in 1905 and reelected until his death in 1917.

Political offices
Preceded by Isaac R. Barksdale	Virginia State Treasurer; 1886–1917	Succeeded by Clarence H. Urner
