= Ric Brown =

Former American economist

13th Virginia Secretary of Finance
- In office August 8, 2008 – January 13, 2018
- Governor: Tim Kaine; Bob McDonnell; Terry McAuliffe
- Preceded by: Jody Wagner
- Succeeded by: Aubrey Layne

Director of the Virginia Department of Planning and Budget
- In office June 1, 2001 – August 8, 2008
- Governor: Jim Gilmore; Mark Warner; Tim Kaine
- Preceded by: Scott D. Pattison
- Succeeded by: Daniel Timberlake

Personal details
- Born: Richard Daryl Brown; June 1, 1946 (age 80) Arlington, Virginia, U.S.
- Education: College of William & Mary; University of Richmond

Richard Daryl "Ric" Brown (born June 1, 1946) is an American economist who served from 2008 to 2018 as the Virginia Secretary of Finance. He joined the Virginia Department of Planning and Budget in 1971 and was appointed as its director by Governor Jim Gilmore in 2001. He was reappointed in 2002 and 2006 and, in 2008, was made Secretary of Finance following Jody Wagner's departure to run for Lieutenant Governor of Virginia.

Born in Arlington, Virginia, Brown graduated in 1968 from the College of William & Mary, earning a B.A. in economics and received a Master of Commerce degree from the University of Richmond.

Political offices
Preceded by Jody Wagner	Virginia Secretary of Finance; 2008–2018	Succeeded by Aubrey Layne
