= Ronald L. Tillett =

American government official

Ron Tillett

9th Virginia Secretary of Finance
- In office 1996–2001
- Governor: George Allen; Jim Gilmore
- Preceded by: Paul W. Timmreck
- Succeeded by: John W. Forbes II

Treasurer of Virginia
- In office 1993–1996
- Governor: Douglas Wilder; George Allen
- Preceded by: Eddie N. Moore Jr.
- Succeeded by: Susan Dewey

Personal details
- Born: Ronald Lee Tillett; 1956 (age 69–70) Norfolk, Virginia, U.S.
- Party: Republican
- Education: Old Dominion University; Virginia Commonwealth University

Ronald Lee Tillett (born 1956) is an American government official who served as Virginia Secretary of Finance in the cabinets of George Allen and Jim Gilmore. He was previously Virginia State Treasurer.
