= Braxton Powell =

Treasurer of Virginia
- In office January 16, 2006 – December 31, 2008
- Governor: Tim Kaine
- Preceded by: Jody Wagner
- Succeeded by: Manju Ganeriwala

Personal details
- Born: James Braxton Powell; November 23, 1944 Suffolk, Virginia, U.S.
- Died: May 2, 2010 (aged 65) Midlothian, Virginia, U.S.
- Spouse: Judy Scott
- Education: Virginia Tech (BS)

James Braxton Powell (November 23, 1944 – May 2, 2010) served as the State Treasurer of Virginia from January, 2006 to December 2008. He was appointed by Governor Tim Kaine. Prior to his appointment as State Treasurer, he had served since January, 2002, as Deputy State Treasurer under Governor Mark Warner.

As Deputy State Treasurer, Powell was responsible for assisting then-State Treasurer Jody Wagner with the day-to-day operation of the Treasury and its budget in excess of $16.4 million. A graduate of Virginia Tech, Powell also served at the Treasury in other capacities, including Director of Financial Policy, Manager of Cash and Banking and Cash Administrator. While serving as Director of Financial Policy, Powell prepared briefs for the legislature and helped shape goals and objectives for the Treasury’s strategic plan.

As Treasurer of Virginia under Governor Kaine and Secretary of Finance Jody Wagner, Powell serves on the following boards and authorities, the first six being staffed by the Department of the Treasury: Commonwealth of Virginia Treasury Board, Debt Capacity Advisory Committee, Virginia College Building Authority, Virginia Public Building Authority, Virginia Public School Authority, Tobacco Settlement Financing Corporation, Virginia College Savings Plan, Virginia Housing Development Authority, Virginia Port Authority, Virginia Resources Authority and the Virginia Small Business Financing Authority.

Powell is a member of the National Association of State Treasurers and was recently elected to serve as Vice-President of the Association's southern region. Powell also serves on the Association's Unclaimed Property Committee, and its Banking, Collateral and Cash Management Committee.

== Biography ==
Powell graduated from Virginia Tech with a B.S. in Business Administration (Finance), and he has earned certificates for his participation in the Commonwealth’s Virginia Executive Institute and the National Institute for Public Finance sponsored or presented by the National Association of State Treasurers. Powell has also served the state at the former Virginia Department of Management Analysis and Systems Development and the Virginia Employment Commission. A speaker at the national level in the field of cash management, Powell has presented white papers at various conferences, and he is also published in the Journal of Cash Management.

Powell’s contributions to the Commonwealth’s cash management initiatives also have been recognized by Governor Gerald L. Baliles. In addition to Governor Baliles’ recognition, the Virginia Automated Clearing House Association acknowledged Powell’s professional leadership in the development of the Vendor Express Project, which is still in use today. A Certified Cash Manager by the Association of Financial Professionals, Powell was also a member of Virginia’s Commonwealth Association of Financial Professionals formerly the Commonwealth Treasury Management Association. His previous leadership roles within the organization include Director and President.

A native of Suffolk, Virginia, Powell was married to Judy Scott Powell, also of Suffolk and a retired elementary school teacher from Chesterfield County, Virginia. Married for forty years, they had two daughters, Christina Powell Jenkins of Chesterfield County and Kendall Powell Odorizzi of Lafayette, Colorado, and four grandchildren. Powell died in 2010.
