= Virginia Department of Taxation =

State government agency in Virginia

Agency overview
- Formed: 1950; 76 years ago
- Type: Department
- Jurisdiction: Virginia
- Headquarters: Richmond, Virginia
- Employees: 430
- Annual budget: $99.5m USD (2021)

The Virginia Department of Taxation is the executive branch agency of the state government responsible for taxation in the state of Virginia in the United States.

== Background ==
Established by the Virginia General Assembly in 1950, the agency is headquartered in Richmond, Virginia and is overseen by the Virginia Secretary of Finance, with day-to-day operations led by a Tax Commissioner appointed by the Governor of Virginia. The mission of the agency is to "serve the public by acting ethically and efficiently in our administration of Virginia’s tax laws."

The agency is currently led by Craig M. Burns, who has served as Tax Commissioner since November 2010
