= John Boyd (farmer) =

American activist

Personal details
- Born: John Wesley Boyd Jr. September 4, 1965 (age 61) New York City, U.S.
- Party: Democratic
- Spouse(s): Kim Stanley (m. 1990–1992) Kara Brewer Boyd (m. 2013)
- Children: 2
- Education: Parkview Highscool
- Occupation: Farmer
- Website: johnboydjr.com

John Wesley Boyd Jr. (born September 4, 1965) is an African-American farmer, civil rights activist and the founder of the National Black Farmers Association (NBFA).

He owns and operates Boyd Farms, which has 1,500-acre (6.1 km^{2}) across three farms in Baskerville, Virginia where he grows soybean, corn and wheat and currently raises one hundred and fifty head of beef cattle. For 14 years Boyd was a chicken farmer in a Perdue Farms breeder program. He was also a tobacco farmer for many years before filing for bankruptcy. He attended Southside Community College.

== Career ==
Boyd is a fourth-generation African-American farmer. He formed the National Black Farmers Association, a Virginia-based non-profit organization, in 1995. In 2000, Boyd was the Democratic nominee for election to Virginia's 5th congressional district running against independent incumbent Virgil Goode. Goode later became a Republican.

In his role with the National Black Farmers Association, Boyd has worked closely with national leaders in government, agriculture organizations and rural groups nationwide as well as internationally. Boyd was appointed by then-Virginia Governor-elect Tim Kaine to serve as co-chair of his Policy Committee on Agriculture and Forestry during the transition period. In 2000, Boyd was appointed by President Bill Clinton to serve on his administration's tobacco commission. Prior to that, he was appointed by then-Virginia Governor Jim Gilmore to serve on the Virginia Tobacco Indemnification and Community Revitalization Commission. His term lasted from July 1, 1999, until June 30, 2001.

After leading public rallies and an intensive NBFA member lobbying effort, Congress approved and President Barack Obama signed into law in December 2010 legislation that set aside $1.15 billion to resolve the outstanding Black farmers cases. Boyd attended the bill signing ceremony at the White House. Boyd said, "I don't think this is about the money. I think this is about justice."

Boyd was quoted in the national press numerous times on the Cobell Native American trust fund case. His work on that case, which was resolved when it was grouped with the Black farmers legislation, helped lead to a $3.4 billion legal settlement. He told National Public Radio in November 2010 that "This has been just a long struggle for the black farmers and for the Cobell case as well."

== National attention ==
Boyd was named ABC World News Tonight's Person of the Week on Friday, November 21, 2003. The next year he was featured in the CBS Evening News Eye on America report. And he has appeared on CBS's 60 Minutes, Nightline, CNN and other television networks.

He has been named one of the "100 Most Influential Black Americans and Organization Leaders" by Ebony magazine.

Boyd was vetted to be a contender to serve in President Obama's Cabinet as Secretary of Agriculture in President Barack Obama's cabinet. Early in the process, Congressional Quarterly (CQ) reported that some members of the Congressional Black Caucus had thrown their support to Boyd. However, the position ultimately went to Tom Vilsack of Iowa.

In August 2022, Boyd appeared on Fox & Friends First, where he discussed the crisis facing America's black farmers and what he deemed the Biden administration's failure to address their issues.
