= Bernard McNamee =

American lawyer

Bernard L. McNamee
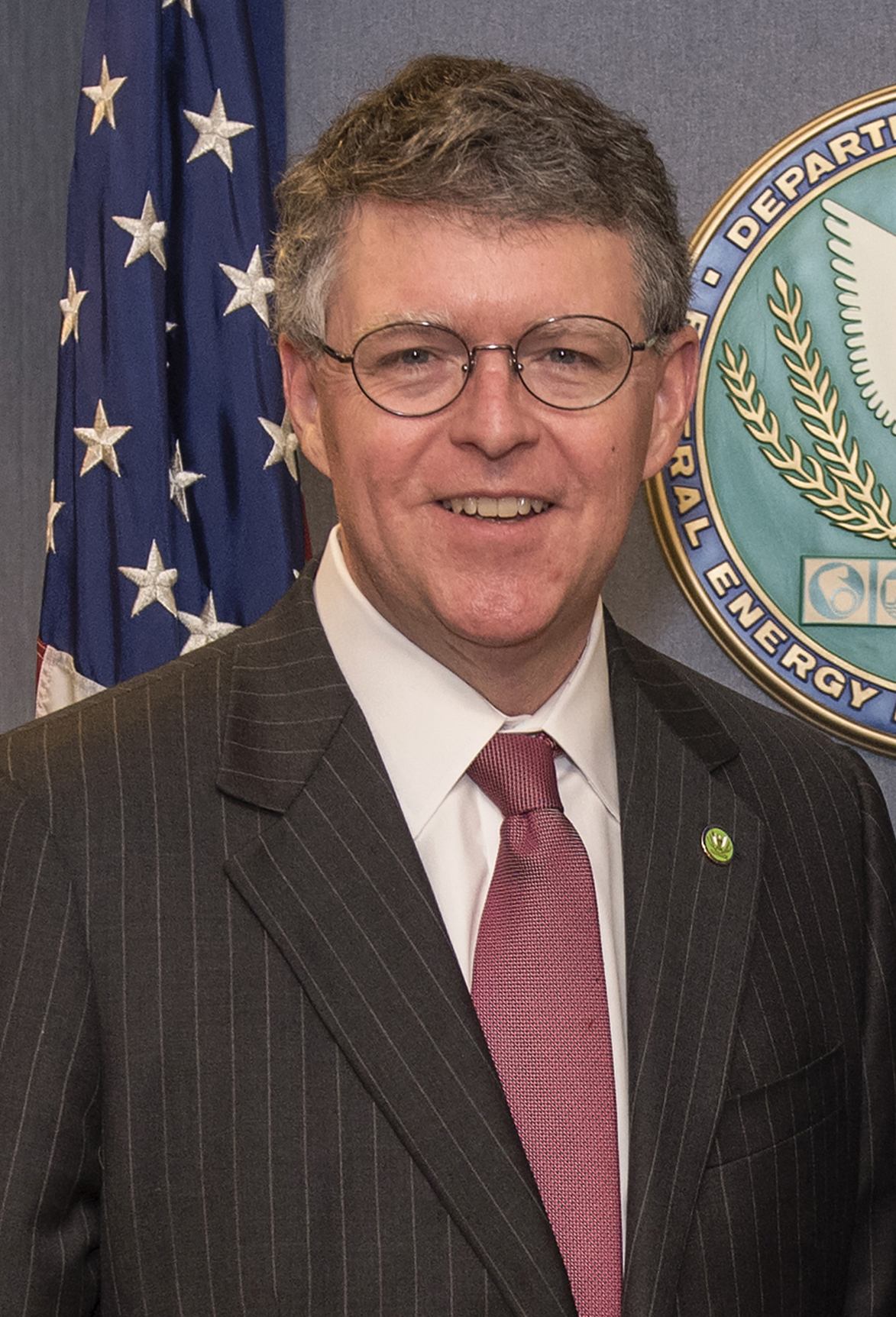

Commissioner of the Federal Energy Regulatory Commission
- In office December 11, 2018 – September 4, 2020
- President: Donald Trump
- Preceded by: Robert Powelson
- Succeeded by: Mark Christie

Personal details
- Born: Bernard L. McNamee; 1967 (age 58–59)
- Party: Republican
- Education: University of Virginia (BA); Emory University School of Law (JD)

Bernard L. McNamee (born 1967) is an American attorney and former government official who served as Commissioner of the Federal Energy Regulatory Commission (FERC) from 2018 to 2020. Nominated to the position by President Donald Trump, McNamee was confirmed to the position by the United States Senate on December 6, 2018.

He previously served in various state and federal legal and policy positions and practiced energy law in the private sector. He is currently a partner at McGuireWoods LLP and a senior advisor at McGuireWoods Consulting LLC.

== Education ==
McNamee was born in 1967. McNamee received a B.A. from the University of Virginia and a Juris Doctor degree from Emory University School of Law.

== Career ==
Before joining FERC, McNamee served in the U.S. Department of Energy as executive director of the Office of Policy and deputy general counsel for energy policy. After serving in the Department of Energy under Secretary Rick Perry, he joined the Texas Public Policy Foundation, a conservative think tank.

His career in public service includes key leadership positions under Attorneys General in Virginia and Texas and policy advisor roles for U.S. Senator Ted Cruz, Attorney General Ken Paxton, and a Governor of Virginia.

Prior to federal service, McNamee was a partner in McGuireWoods’ Regulatory & Compliance Department. He assisted electric and natural gas utilities in rate cases and in obtaining approvals to build generating facilities and transmission lines, as well as the development of renewable portfolio standards (RPS) and integrated resource planning (IRP).

=== Federal Energy Regulatory Commission (FERC) ===
McNamee was nominated by President Donald Trump to serve as a commissioner on the Federal Energy Regulatory Commission (FERC), and was confirmed to the position by the United States Senate in 2018.

His nomination faced criticism from his past work at the Texas Public Policy Foundation (TPPF), where he argued that fossil fuels are "key to our prosperity". While working at the TPPF, he argued that renewable energy "screws up the whole physics of the grid", and described environmentalist lawsuits as a "constant battle between liberty and tyranny". He was ultimately confirmed in a party-line 50-49 vote in the Senate.

During his time on the Commission, McNamee worked on a number of energy issues and participated in more than 1,700 published orders on issues related to wholesale electricity markets, natural gas pipelines, liquefied natural gas (LNG) export facilities, oil pipeline rates, hydro facilities, reliability standards, and ratemaking.

He also testified before Congress and was invited to speak before energy organizations throughout the country. McNamee assists clients with high-stakes and complex issues involving the Federal Power Act (FPA), Natural Gas Act (NGA), Public Utility Regulatory Policies Act (PURPA), Interstate Commerce Act (ICA), and Renewable Fuel Standard (RFS).

=== Post-FERC career ===
McNamee is a partner at McGuireWoods LLP and a senior advisor at McGuireWoods Consulting LLC. McNamee provides clients legal, policy and legislative guidance on a wide range of energy and environmental issues. McNamee has been a member of the Federalist Society since 1990.

His practice focuses on strategic planning and policy development, legislation, and rulemakings, including issues involving Congress, the U.S. Department of Energy, the Environmental Protection Agency, and the Federal Energy Regulatory Commission (FERC), as well as regional transmission organizations (RTOs) and independent system operators (ISOs).

==== Project 2025 ====
In 2023, McNamee authored the chapter on the Department of Energy for the ninth edition of the Heritage Foundation's book Mandate for Leadership, which provides the policy agenda for Project 2025.
