= George Landrith =

American lawyer

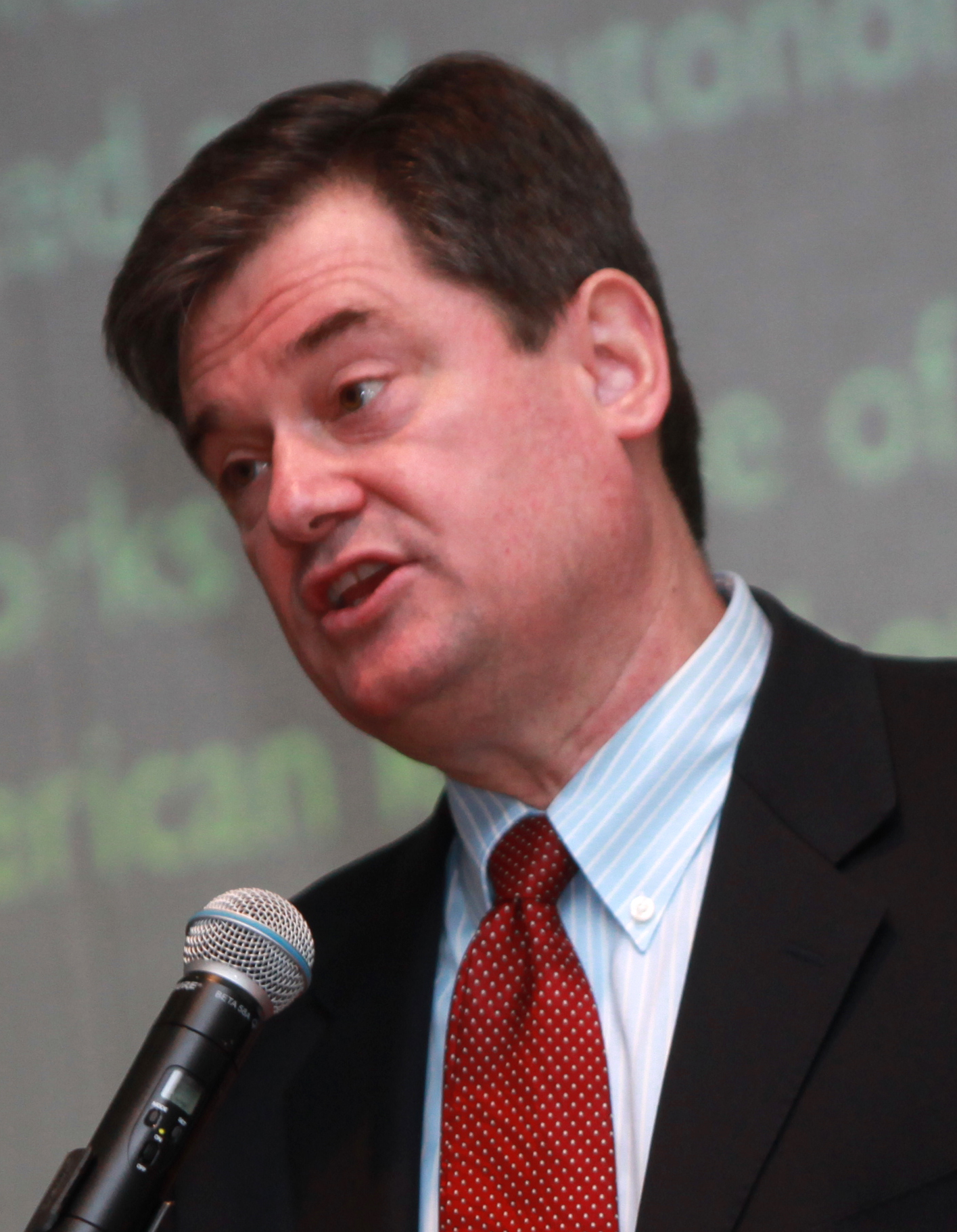
- Born: George Clay Landrith III; October 27, 1960 (age 65); Fairfax County, Virginia, U.S.
- Education: Brigham Young University (B.A.); University of Virginia (J.D.)
- Political party: Republican
- Spouse: Laura

George Clay Landrith III (born October 27, 1960) is the president of the Frontiers of Freedom Institute, a position he has held since 1998. The institute is a conservative public policy think tank founded by retired United States Senator Malcolm Wallop (R-Wyoming).

== Education ==
Landrith is a 1988 graduate of the University of Virginia School of Law, where he earned a Juris Doctor and was business editor of the Virginia Journal of Law and Politics. He graduated in 1985, magna cum laude, from Brigham Young University earning a B.A. studying political science and economics.

== Professional and political experience ==
Landrith is a member of the bar in Virginia and California and is admitted to practice before the United States Supreme Court.

In 1994 and 1996, Landrith was the Republican Party candidate for the United States House of Representatives from Virginia's Fifth Congressional District. In 1994, he lost by 6% to then-incumbent L.F. Payne (D-Va). Election analyst and pundit Larry Sabato described both candidates as follows: "Payne lacks the charisma that Landrith exudes on television and in debates."

In 1996, Payne retired from Congress and conservative Virginia State Senator Virgil Goode ran as the Democratic candidate. Goode's State Senate district had made up approximately 25% of the Fifth Congressional District, which helped him win the 1996 Congressional election. In 2000, Goode withdrew from the Democratic Party and became an independent who caucused with the Republicans. In 2002, Goode officially became a Republican.

Landrith served on the Albemarle County School Board (Virginia) from 1992 to 1995. While serving on the board, Landrith developed a strong reputation for fiscal responsibility, educational reforms that focused on accountability and curriculum content, and parental rights.

In 1996, Landrith was appointed by then Governor George F. Allen and confirmed by the Virginia General Assembly to serve on the Virginia Workforce 2000 Advocacy Council. As an adjunct professor at the George Mason University School of Law, Landrith has taught constitutional law, appellate advocacy, and legal writing.

Before joining Frontiers of Freedom, Landrith was the vice president and general counsel of the National Legal Center for the Public Interest (1996–1998). Prior to 1996, Landrith had a successful law practice in business law, litigation, and commercial transactions.

== Media appearances ==
Landrith has appeared frequently on television and radio news programs, including ABC World News Tonight, CBS Evening News, NBC Nightly News, Meet the Press (NBC), This Week with George Stephanopoulos (ABC), The O'Reilly Factor (Fox News), Hannity & Colmes (Fox News), Fox & Friends (Fox News), The Today Show (NBC), CNN News, The Big Story with John Gibson (Fox News), Your World with Neil Cavuto (Fox News), and PBS NewsHour.

Landrith has also been a frequent speaker and lecturer at public policy forums and conferences in the U.S. and internationally.

== Writings ==
Landrith's work has been printed in over 100 newspapers across the nation, including: The Washington Times, Chicago Tribune, Los Angeles Daily News, National Review, The Sacramento Bee, Fort Worth Star-Telegram, The Providence Journal, and Human Events. He has been quoted in many of the nation's leading newspapers, including: The New York Times, The Wall Street Journal, and The Washington Post.

In 2004, Landrith published a book entitled, On Politics and Policy: Views on Freedom from an American Conservative.
