= Charles Pinckney Jones =

American politician (1845–1914)

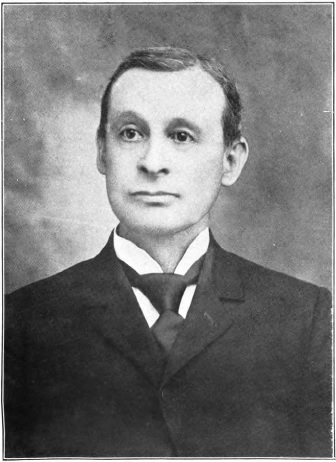
- Portrait of Charles Pinckney Jones

Member of the Virginia Senate
- In office 1885–1897

Member of the Virginia House of Delegates
- In office 1884–1885

Personal details
- Born: September 17, 1845 Pendleton County, Virginia, U.S.
- Died: February 22, 1914 (aged 68) Monterey, Virginia, U.S.
- Spouse: Martha Jane Wilson (m. 1872)
- Children: Edwin B. Jones
- Occupation: Politician; lawyer

Charles Pinckney Jones (September 17, 1845 – February 22, 1914) was an American soldier and politician from Virginia.

== Biography ==
Charles Pinckney Jones was born in Pendleton County, Virginia. He enlisted in the Confederate States Army. He served as a private in the 18th Virginia Cavalry; and according to the Fort Stevens Confederate order of battle, the unit was assigned to Imboden's and W.L. Jackson's Brigade participating in the Gettysburg campaign, skirmishing the Federals in western Virginia. Later, the cavalry served in the Shenandoah Valley before disbanding in April 1865. He attended the University of Virginia Law School graduating in 1868. He established a law practice in Monterey. On January 17, 1872, he married Martha Jane Wilson, great-great-great granddaughter of Colonel John Wilson, a longtime member of the Virginia House of Burgesses until his death in 1773. His son was state treasurer Edwin B. Jones.

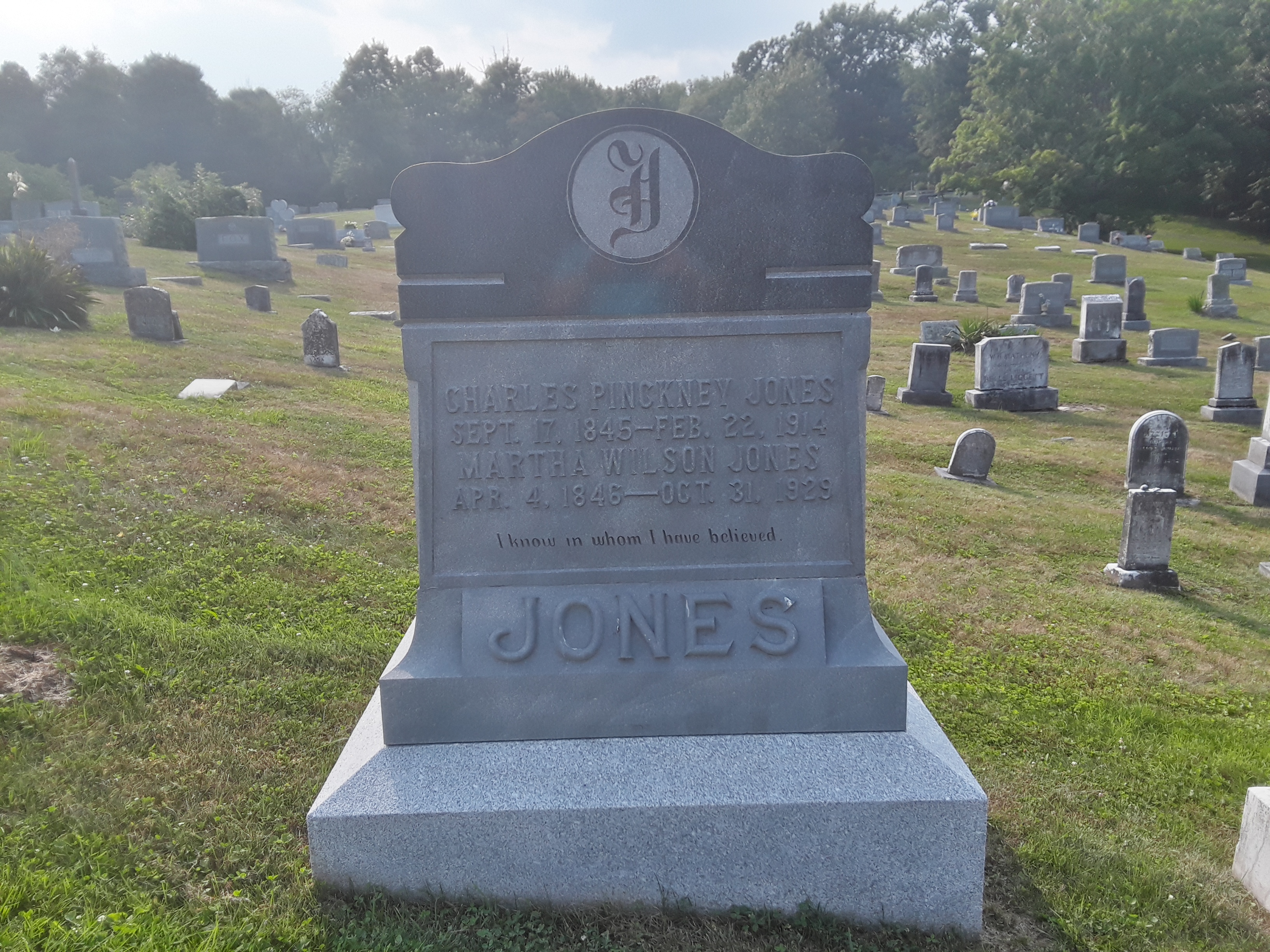
Grave of Jones in Monterey Cemetery

Jones was elected to the Virginia House of Delegates in 1883. In 1885, he was elected to the Virginia Senate, serving the counties of Highland, Bath and Alleghany until 1897. He was chairman of the committees on privileges and elections from 1889 to 1892 and chairman of the committee of court of justice from 1893 to 1894. From 1898 to 1906, he was a member of the Board of Visitors of the University of Virginia and in that first year was elected by the board to be the Rector of the University. He was the last Rector to serve the university before they adopted the presidential system for the school. The first president of the University, Edwin A. Alderman, was informally installed as President September 15, 1904. Charles P. Jones formally inducted the new president at a ceremony on Thomas Jefferson's birthday anniversary, April 13, 1905. He died in Monterey on February 22, 1914.

The C.P. Jones House and Law Office at Monterey was listed on the National Register of Historic Places in 2013.
