= National Black Farmers Association =

- National Black Farmers Association
- Founder: John Boyd Jr.
- Type: 501(c)(3), Nonprofit
- Tax ID no.: 47-2081033
- Website: www.blackfarmers.org

The National Black Farmers Association (NBFA) is a non-profit organization representing African American farmers and their families in the United States. As an association, it serves tens of thousands of members nationwide. NBFA's education and advocacy efforts have been focused on civil rights, land retention, access to public and private loans, education and agricultural training, and rural economic development for black and other small farmers.

== Founding ==
The organization was founded in 1995 by John W. Boyd, Jr., a fourth-generation African-American farmer from Baskerville, Virginia, near the town of South Hill, Virginia. He continues to serve as the group's president. Boyd's work for the NBFA has been chronicled by national news outlets, including a "Person of the Week" profile on ABC World News Tonight, The Washington Post, and Roll Call, which is influential on Capitol Hill.

Since its inception, NBFA has been a national voice on the issue of farm subsidies, arguing that Black farmers are left out of the massive system of subsidies provided by the government.

== History ==
Many black farmers across the nation experienced discrimination in their dealings with U.S. Department of Agriculture (USDA) agencies in their states. Across the nation, black farmers alleged, and the USDA later agreed, they were denied access to loans and subsidies provided by the government. On a national level, farm subsidies that were afforded to white farmers were not afforded to black farmers. Since they were denied government loans, emergency or disaster assistance, and other aid, many black farmers lost their farms and their homes.

Black farmers nationwide joined in a class action discrimination suit against the USDA. The first prominent cases were filed in federal court in 1997. An attorney called it "the most organized, largest civil rights case in the history of the country."

That year, black farmers from at least five states held protests in front of the USDA headquarters in Washington, DC. Protests in front of the USDA were a strategy employed in later years as the black farmers sought to keep national attention focused on the plight of the black farmers.

That year, representatives of the National Black Farmers Association met with President Bill Clinton and other administration officials at the White House. And NBFA's president testified before the United States House Committee on Agriculture.

In Pigford v. Glickman U.S. Federal District Court Judge Paul L. Friedman approved the settlement agreement and consent decree in the case on April 14, 1999. The settlement recognized discrimination against 22,363 black farmers but the NBFA would later call the agreement incomplete because more than 70,000 were excluded. Nevertheless, the settlement was deemed to be the largest-ever civil rights class action settlement in American history. Lawyers estimated the value of the settlement to be more than $2 billion. Some farmers would have their debts forgiven. Judge Friedman appointed a monitor to oversee the settlement.

Farmers in Alabama, Mississippi, Arkansas and Georgia were among those affected by the settlement.

The NBFA's president was invited to testify before congress on this matter numerous times following the settlement including before the United States Senate Committee on Agriculture on September 12, 2000 when he testified that many farmers had not yet received payments and others were left out of the settlement. NBFA asked Congress to pass legislation that would ensure a full resolution of the discrimination cases.

It was later found that one DoJ staff "general attorney" was unlicensed while she was handling black farmers' cases. NBFA called for all those cases to be reheard.

In 2006 the Government Accountability Office (GAO) issued a report highly critical of the USDA in its handling of the black farmers cases.

NBFA continued to lobby Congress to provide relief. NBFA's Boyd secured congressional support for legislation that would provide $100 million in funds to settle late-filer cases. In 2006 a bill was introduced into the House of Representatives and later the Senate by Senator George Felix Allen.

In 2007 Boyd testified before the United States House Committee on the Judiciary about this legislation.

As the organization was making headway by gathering Congressional supporters in 2007 it was revealed that some USDA Farm Services Agency employees were engaged in activities aimed at blocking Congressional legislation that would aid the black farmers.

President Barack Obama, then a U.S. Senator, lent his support to the black farmers' issues in 2007. A bill cosponsored by Obama passed the Senate in 2007.

The Senate and House versions of the black farmers bill, reopening black farmers discrimination cases, became law in 2008. The new law could affect up to 74,000 black farmers according to some news reports.

In 2008 hundreds of black farmers, denied a chance to have their cases heard in the Pigford settlement, filed a new lawsuit against USDA.

Later in 2008, the GAO issued a new report sharply critical of the USDA's handling of discrimination complaints. The GAO recommended an oversight review board to examine civil rights complaints.

After numerous public rallies and an intensive NBFA member lobbying effort, Congress approved and President Barack Obama signed into law in December 2010 legislation that set aside $1.15 billion to resolve the outstanding Black farmers cases. NBFA's John W. Boyd, Jr. attended the bill signing ceremony at the White House. As of 2013, 90,000 African-American, Hispanic, female and Native American farmers had filed claims, some fraudulent, or even transparently bogus.

On August 26, 2020, the National Black Farmers Association filed a lawsuit in a St. Louis court seeking to force Monsanto and its parent company Bayer to end the sale of Roundup. The lawsuit alleges that black farmers across the United States have been forced to use Roundup-resistant seeds and Roundup in increasingly heavier applications, and that Monsanto failed to inform the farmers of the weedkiller's risks.

On July 3, 2024, the National Black Farmers Association called for the resignation of Tractor Supply's CEO after the company announced it would eliminate its diversity, equity, and inclusion (DEI) initiatives, as well as its climate advocacy efforts, following pressure from conservative activists.

== Awards ==
Over the years, the NBFA has given its advocate of the year award to Senator Charles Grassley as well as Congressmen John Conyers, Robert C. Scott, Earl F. Hilliard, Eva M. Clayton.
