= Aubrey Layne =

American businessman (born 1956)

14th Virginia Secretary of Finance
- In office January 13, 2018 – July 1, 2021
- Governor: Ralph Northam
- Preceded by: Ric Brown
- Succeeded by: Joe Flores

13th Virginia Secretary of Transportation
- In office January 11, 2014 – January 13, 2018
- Governor: Terry McAuliffe
- Preceded by: Sean Connaughton
- Succeeded by: Shannon Valentine

Personal details
- Born: Aubrey Lee Layne Jr. June 19, 1956 (age 70) Newport News, Virginia, U.S.
- Party: Republican
- Spouse: Peggy Allen Kincheloe
- Education: University of Richmond (BS); Old Dominion University (MBA)
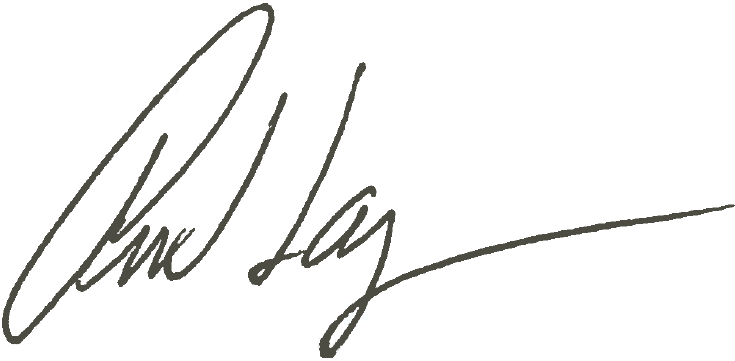
- Signature

Aubrey Lee Layne Jr. (born June 19, 1956) is an American businessman who served as the Virginia Secretary of Finance from 2018 to 2021. He was previously appointed by Governor Terry McAuliffe, to the Commonwealth Transportation Board for a five-year term and later served as Virginia Secretary of Transportation in McAuliffe's administration. Layne was subsequently appointed as Virginia Secretary of Finance by Governor-elect Ralph Northam.

Born in Newport News, Layne attended the University of Richmond and received a Master of Business Administration degree from Old Dominion University.

Political offices
Preceded by Ric Brown	Virginia Secretary of Finance; 2018-present	Succeeded by Incumbent
Preceded by Sean Connaughton	Virginia Secretary of Transportation; 2014-2018	Succeeded by Shannon Valentine
