= David L. Richardson =

American lawyer

David Richardson

Treasurer of Virginia
- Incumbent
- Assumed office June 2, 2022
- Governor: Glenn Youngkin; Abigail Spanberger
- Preceded by: Manju Ganeriwala

Personal details
- Born: David Lee Richardson II; March 1, 1954 (age 72) Washington, D.C., U.S.
- Education: University of Virginia (BA, JD)

David Lee Richardson II (born March 1, 1954) is an American lawyer and public official who currently serves as Treasurer of Virginia, after being appointed by Governor Glenn Youngkin in June 2022. He was previously a partner at McGuireWoods for over four decades. He was retained by Governor Abigail Spanberger.

Richardson was born in Washington, D.C., on March 1, 1954, and was educated at the University of Virginia, where he received an undergraduate degree in economics and a Juris Doctor degree.

Political offices
Preceded by Manju Ganeriwala	Treasurer of Virginia; 2022–present	Incumbent
