= Becker's Hospital Review =

Medical trade magazine

Becker's Hospital Review is a medical industry trade magazine that does its own research, supplementing this with government-released data and U.S. News & World Report rankings. It is published by ASC Communications, Inc., an Illinois corporation owned or controlled by its registered agent, Scott Becker, and lists with the Illinois Secretary of State its offices as being located at 77 W. Wacker Drive, Chicago, Illinois. It covers its field from the prospective of those involved: doctors, hospitals, and those who pay: patients and the general public (via taxes and insurance premiums). Some of these topics come together, such as a hospital's payout for disclosing a patient's HIV information to the person's employer, and reviewing how their privacy policy can accommodate the needs of hospital staff, those being treated, and the employer's insurance personnel.

Government web sites refer to their information, and they summarize legislative hearings, albeit much of this is press releases by various agencies.

== Overview ==
Their data has impact: a nurses' union's 2011 public statements cited Becker's data to justify their demands. Becker's reports on how data is used (or abused) and they cite, review and analyze surveys and rankings, including how various subgroups of medical practitioners are affected. A Bank's securities industry review about using Artificial Intelligence opened with some of Becker's numbers.

Notable information sources cite their annual rankings and "Top" lists.

=== Lists ===
Among the categories for which Becker's' produces lists are:

- Great Hospitals in America
- Top Places to Work in Health Care (including Work/Life Balance)
- African-American Leaders in Healthcare

== History ==
Their founder/publisher is Scott Becker, a partner at McGuireWoods, who "also served as chair of the national health care practice at McGuireWoods." They began in 2007, and compete with 1976-founded Modern Healthcare.

In addition to their ratings services, Becker, who is also a CPA, partners with Deloitte, one of the Big Four accounting firms, to collect and analyze hospital data. Their industry coverage includes personnel changes. During the 2020 coronavirus period, they collected and reported on healthcare spending, including employee layoffs. A notable user-contributed collection of articles references them.
