= C.P. Jones House and Law Office =

Historic house in Virginia, United States

- U.S. National Register of Historic Places
- Virginia Landmarks Register
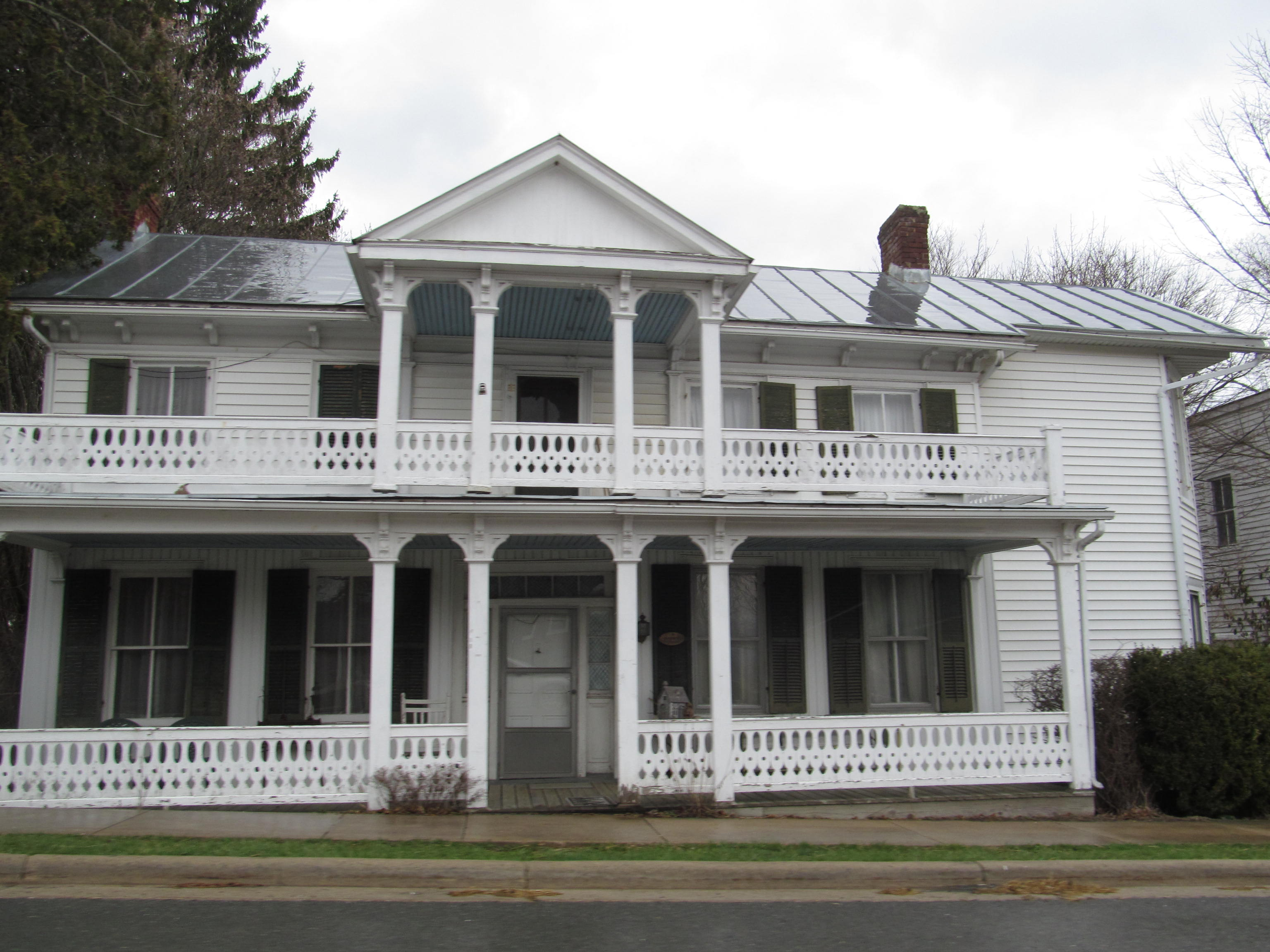
- C.P. Jones House

- Location within Virginia Location within the United States
- Location: 144 & 160 W. Main St., Monterey, Virginia
- Coordinates: 38°24′48″N 79°34′55″W
- Area: 0.634 acres (0.257 ha)
- Built: c. 1850, c. 1873
- Architect: Wilson, William E.
- Architectural style: Folk Victorian
- NRHP reference No.: 13000989
- VLR No.: 262-5001

Significant dates
- Added to NRHP: December 24, 2013
- Designated VLR: September 19, 2013

C.P. Jones House and Law Office is a historic home and law office located at Monterey, Highland County, Virginia. The original section of the house dates to about 1850 and may be the oldest building house in Monterey still standing. It may have been used as a tavern and as a courtroom before the county courthouse was built. Originally the house was a two-story, four-room log building on a stone foundation. Several rooms and porches were added between the middle of the 19th century and the beginning of the 20th century which gave it a Folk Victorian style. The law office was built about 1873, and is a one-story frame building. Also on the property are the two-story garage/smoke house/woodshed, a one-story apple shed/cellar, and a one-story brick spring house ruin. It was the home of the American lawyer and politician Charles Pinckney Jones (1845–1914).

It was listed on the National Register of Historic Places in 2013.

== History and description ==
The original building was constructed ca. 1850 on a plot that has at least seven springs on it. One of these was used to supply water for the town and another was equipped with a windmill to pump water to the house. The house may be the oldest surviving house in Monterey. It have been used as a tavern and as a courtroom prior to the construction of the county courthouse. During the American Civil War, one of its rooms was fitted with an separate entrance and may have served as a temporary hospital. The house was purchased in 1873 by Charles Pinckney Jones, a former soldier in the 18th Virginia Cavalry Regiment during the Civil War, and a lawyer. He built his law office shortly after purchasing the property, on the southwest corner of the lot, facing the county courthouse across the street, and used that office until his death in 1914.

"The house was originally built as a two-room-up and two-room-down log dwelling with a gable roof. Brick chimneys are located on the exterior of the east and west ends of the main building. During the latter part of the 19th century, several additions were added to accommodate the growing Jones family. At that time the exterior chimney on the east end of the log dwelling was concealed in the construction of additional rooms at that end of the house. A rear ell addition was added to the north side of the house as well. At the same time that those additions were put on, weatherboard siding and ornamental trim were added. The siding was whitewashed and the shutters were painted green. A formal, two-story porch was added and it included such ornamentation as square support brackets, a cutout balustrade, and a projecting gable at the center of the porch over the second-story door. The house now stands as a two-story vernacular dwelling with Victorian-era trim. Although vinyl siding has more recently been added covering the wooden siding, the ornamental returned eaves, bracketed cornice, and fascia boards are still exposed. Standing-seam metal covers the roof. The south façade features five bays consisting of two symmetrically spaced windows to either side of a central entry on the first and second stories. The tall windows feature two-over-two wood sash. The first-story entrance is highlighted by multiple-pane sidelights and a rectangular transom."
