= Edwin B. Jones (politician) =

American politician (died 1946)

Virginia State Treasurer
- In office February 1938 – 1942
- Governor: James H. Price
- Preceded by: Arthur B. Gathright
- Succeeded by: W. Tayloe Murphy

Member of the Virginia House of Delegates
- In office 1922–1938

Personal details
- Born: Highland County, Virginia, U.S.
- Died: May 19, 1946 (aged 69) Richmond, Virginia, U.S.
- Resting place: Monterey Cemetery; Monterey, Virginia, U.S.
- Spouse: Iola Jeanette Turner (m. 1908)
- Children: 6
- Parent: Charles Pinckney Jones (father)
- Education: Randolph–Macon College (BA); University of Virginia School of Law (LLB)
- Occupation: Politician; lawyer; farmer

Edwin B. Jones (died May 19, 1946) was an American politician from Virginia. He served in the Virginia House of Delegates from 1922 to 1938 and as Virginia state treasurer from 1938 to 1942.

== Early life ==
Edwin B. Jones was born in Highland County, Virginia, to Martha (née Wilson) and Charles Pinckney Jones. He attended public schools in Highland County. He graduated from Randolph–Macon College with a Bachelor of Arts. He graduated from the University of Virginia School of Law with a Bachelor of Laws in 1900. He was a member of Phi Kappa Sigma and Phi Delta Phi fraternities.

== Career ==
After graduating, Jones practiced law in Monterey. He had a law office there until his death. In 1914, he became president of the Citizen's Bank of Highland County. After its merger with the First National Bank of Highland in 1929, he served as its president until at least 1938. and was a livestock breeder. He was a large land owner and a farmer. He served as a commonwealth's attorney for eight years.

Jones was elected to the Virginia House of Delegates in 1922 and served four terms until 1938. He served as chairman of the committee on counties, cities and towns. He was appointed to the simplification and economy in state government by Governor Elbert Lee Trinkle. He was appointed to the liberal arts college commission by Governor Harry F. Byrd.

In February 1938, Jones became Virginia state treasurer under Governor James Hubert Price, replacing Arthur B. Gathright. He served until his retirement in 1942. He was then appointed by attorney general A. P. Staples as assistant attorney general. He remained in that role until his death.

== Personal life ==
Jones married Iola Jeanette Turner, daughter of J. Samuel Turner, on October 24, 1908. They had six children, Edwin B. Jr., R. Turner, J. Samuel, Hamilton (Hamill) Dice, Miriam Allene and an infant that died in 1911. He was a member of the Methodist Episcopal Church, South. He was the superintendent of the Sunday school and served on its board of stewards.

Jones died on May 19, 1946, aged 69, at his home on Hawthorne Avenue in Richmond. He was buried in Monterey Cemetery.
