= Lewis F. Payne Jr. =

American politician

Lewis Payne
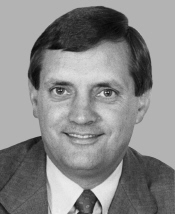

Member of the U.S. House of Representatives from Virginia's 5th district
- In office June 14, 1988 – January 3, 1997 (Note: Payne's official service begins on the date of the special election, while he was not sworn in until June 21, 1988.)
- Preceded by: Dan Daniel
- Succeeded by: Virgil Goode

Personal details
- Born: Lewis Franklin Payne Jr. July 9, 1945 (age 80) Amherst, Virginia, U.S.
- Party: Democratic
- Education: Virginia Military Institute (BS); University of Virginia (MBA)

Military service
- Allegiance: United States
- Branch/service: United States Army
- Years of service: 1967–1970
- Rank: First Lieutenant
- Unit: U.S. Army Reserve

Lewis Franklin "L. F." Payne Jr. (born July 9, 1945) is an American businessman, politician and lobbyist who served as a member of the United States House of Representatives from the Commonwealth of Virginia from 1988 to 1997. He served five terms representing the 5th district of the state, covering much of Southside Virginia.

== Biography ==
Payne was born in Amherst, Virginia. He is a graduate of the Virginia Military Institute and is a veteran and former officer of the U.S. Army. He also earned an M.B.A. from the University of Virginia. Prior to entering Congress, he was the founder and president of Wintergreen Resort.

=== Congress ===
Payne was elected as a Democrat to the 100th United States Congress, in a special election to fill the vacancy caused by the death of Representative Dan Daniel. Payne legislated as a conservative Democrat and was reelected to the four succeeding Congresses (serving from June 14, 1988, to January 3, 1997).

In 1994, his share of the vote fell sharply. Payne retired from Congress in 1997 and ran for lieutenant governor in that same year. He lost a close general election contest to John H. Hager, failing to overcome the tide of Jim Gilmore's gubernatorial victory over Democrat Don Beyer.

=== Later career ===
He then joined McGuireWoods Consulting, a Washington, D.C.–based government relations and lobbying firm associated with the Richmond-based law firm McGuireWoods, LLP.

== Electoral history ==
- 1988 – Payne was elected to the U.S. House of Representatives with 59.3% of the vote in a special election, defeating Republican Linda L. Arey; Payne was re-elected with 54.19% of the vote in the general election, defeating Republican Charles Robert Hawkins and Independent J.F. Cole.
- 1990 – Payne was re-elected unopposed.
- 1992 – Payne was re-elected with 68.9% of the vote, defeating Republican W.A. Hurlburt
- 1994 – Payne was re-elected with 53.28% of the vote, defeating Republican George C. Landrith.

U.S. House of Representatives
| Preceded by Dan Daniel | Member of the U.S. House of Representatives from Virginia's 5th congressional district 1988–1997 | Succeeded by Virgil Goode |
Party political offices
| Preceded by Don Beyer | Democratic nominee for Lieutenant Governor of Virginia; 1997 | Succeeded by Tim Kaine |
U.S. order of precedence (ceremonial)
| Preceded by Carol Shea-Porter as Former U.S. Representative | Order of precedence of the United States as Former U.S. Representative | Succeeded by Elizabeth Holtzman as Former U.S. Representative |
