= Walter Craigie =

American government official

1st Virginia Secretary of Finance
- In office 1972–1973
- Governor: Linwood Holton
- Preceded by: new position
- Succeeded by: William H. Forst

Treasurer of Virginia
- In office 1970–1972
- Governor: Linwood Holton
- Preceded by: Lewis H. Vaden
- Succeeded by: Robert C. Watts Jr.

Personal details
- Born: Walter Willson Craigie
- Died: March 3, 2016; Richmond, Virginia, U.S.
- Political party: Republican
- Education: Princeton University; Harvard Business School

Walter Willson Craigie (died March 3, 2016) was an American government official who served as Virginia Secretary of Finance in the cabinet of Linwood Holton. He was previously Virginia State Treasurer.
