= Manju Ganeriwala =

American politician

Treasurer of Virginia
- In office January 1, 2009 – June 2, 2022
- Governor: Tim Kaine; Bob McDonnell; Terry McAuliffe; Ralph Northam; Glenn Youngkin
- Preceded by: Braxton Powell
- Succeeded by: David L. Richardson

Personal details
- Born: January 24, 1956 (age 69); Akola, India
- Political party: Independent
- Spouse: Suri Ganeriwala
- Education: University of Mumbai (BA); University of Texas, Austin (MBA)

Manju S. Ganeriwala (born January 24, 1956) is the former Treasurer of the Commonwealth of Virginia. She was previously the state's Deputy Secretary of Finance before being appointed as state treasurer by Governor Tim Kaine and was reappointed as state treasurer by three consecutive governors.

Ganeriwala was born in Akola in the Indian state of Maharashtra and grew up in Mumbai. She completed her undergraduate studies at the University of Bombay and earned a Master of Business Administration degree from the University of Texas at Austin. She moved to Virginia and started work with the Virginia Department of Planning and Budget in 1983.

Political offices
Preceded by Braxton Powell	Treasurer of Virginia; 2009–2022	Succeeded by David L. Richardson
