= W. Tayloe Murphy =

American politician (1901–1962)

Member of the Virginia House of Delegates
- In office 1948–1959
- In office 1940–1942

Virginia State Treasurer
- In office 1942–1947
- Governor: Colgate Darden
- Preceded by: Edwin B. Jones
- Succeeded by: Jesse W. Dillon

Personal details
- Born: William Tayloe Murphy; May 6, 1901 Mount Holly, Virginia, U.S.
- Died: November 16, 1962 (aged 61) Warsaw, Virginia, U.S.
- Resting place: Yeocomico Episcopal Church Cemetery; Kinsale, Virginia, U.S.
- Spouse: Katherine Griffith
- Children: 2, including W. Tayloe Jr.
- Education: College of William and Mary
- Occupation: Politician; businessman; bank president

William Tayloe Murphy (May 6, 1901 – November 16, 1962) was an American politician and businessman from Virginia. He served in the Virginia House of Delegates from 1940 to 1942 and from 1948 to 1959. He was Virginia State Treasurer from 1942 to 1947.

== Early life ==
William Tayloe Murphy was born on May 6, 1901, in Mount Holly, Westmoreland County, Virginia, to Mary (née Tayloe) and Robert Murphy. He was educated at Alexandria City High School and the College of William and Mary. He was a member of Pi Kappa Alpha fraternity.

== Career ==
Murphy served as a member of the Virginia House of Delegates from 1940 to 1942. On June 1, 1942, he was appointed as state treasurer by Governor Colgate Darden, succeeding Edwin B. Jones. In 1948, he served again in the House of Delegates until his retirement in 1959. He was author of the Revenue Bond Act, a plan to finance the construction of a toll bridge system in eastern Virginia. He was chairman of the Chesapeake and its tributaries committee. He also served on the appropriations, game and inland fisheries, and insurance and banking committees. He served on the governor's advisory board and on the state advisory council on the Virginia economy.

Murphy was a member of the Warsaw Council and served as president of the Northern Neck State Bank in Warsaw for 20 years starting in 1939. He also served as chairman of the board at the Northern Neck State Bank before 1959. He was a trustee of the University of Virginia School of Business Administration and helped form the Northern Neck Regional Planning and Economic Development Commission.

Murphy succeeded Rodney M. Coggin as president of Tidewater Telephone Company. He served as president from July 1958 to 1962. He was director of the Virginia Independent Telephone Association, the Virginia Electric and Power Company and Standard Products Inc. He was a member of VEPCO's executive committee.

== Personal life ==
Murphy married Katherine Bradford Griffith of Richmond County in 1924. They had two children, Ann Elmoine and W. Tayloe Jr. He was an Episcopalian. In 1942, he lived in Emmerton in Richmond.

In 1961, Murphy was diagnosed with cancer and he died a year later of it on November 16, 1962, at his home in Warsaw. He was buried in Yeocomico Episcopal Church Cemetery in Kinsale.

== Awards ==
In 1961, Murphy was named Richmond County's outstanding citizen by the Richmond County Ruritan Club.
