= Paul Van den Bulck =

Belgian lawyer (born 1965)

Paul Van den Bulck (born 1965) is a Belgian lawyer and former president of the Royal Belgian Football Association (URBSFA/KBVB). He was succeeded by Pascale Van Damme.

Paul Van den Bulck is a lawyer and certified mediator in Brussels and Paris. He currently works at the AKD law firm and specialises in information technology, personal data, data protection, and intellectual property. He has previously worked a several law firms, including McGuireWoods, De Bandt, Van Hecke & Lagae (which would become Linklaters law firm in 1999). From 2003 to 2005, he was the president of Eurojuris International. He also taught for 15 years at the Université de Strasbourg, the Université Paris-Panthéon-Assas in France, and the Academy of European Law in Trier.

He studied law at the Université libre de Bruxelles (graduated magna cum laude) and at Duke University in the United States. He is also a Certified Director at GUBERNA, the Belgian Institute of Directors.

In June 2021, he was appointed, together with Pascale Van Damme, as an independent director of the Royal Belgian Football Association. In June 2022, he succeeded Robert Huygens as president. In May 2023, he was succeeded by Pascale Van Damme.
