= Virgil Goode =

American politician (born 1946)

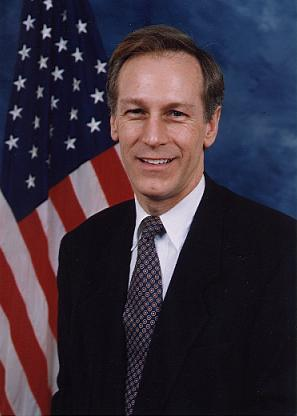

Member of the U.S. House of Representatives from Virginia's 5th district
- In office January 3, 1997 – January 3, 2009
- Preceded by: Lewis Payne
- Succeeded by: Tom Perriello

Member of the Virginia Senate from the 20th district
- In office December 1973 – January 3, 1997
- Preceded by: William Stone
- Succeeded by: Roscoe Reynolds

Personal details
- Born: Virgil Hamlin Goode Jr. October 17, 1946 (age 80) Richmond, Virginia, U.S.
- Party: Democratic (before 2000); Independent (2000–2002); Republican (2002–2010); Constitution (2010–present)
- Other political affiliations: House Democratic Caucus (1997–2000); House Republican Conference (2000–2009)
- Spouse: Lucy Dodson
- Children: 1
- Education: University of Richmond (BA); University of Virginia (JD)

Military service
- Allegiance: United States
- Branch/service: United States Army
- Years of service: 1969–1975
- Unit: Army National Guard • Virginia Army National Guard

Virgil Hamlin Goode Jr. (/ɡuːd/; born October 17, 1946) is an American politician who served as a member of the United States House of Representatives from 5th congressional district of Virginia from 1997 to 2009. He was initially a Democrat, but became an independent in 2000 and switched to the Republican Party in 2002. He was narrowly defeated in 2008 by Democrat Tom Perriello.

In 2012, he was the presidential nominee of the Constitution Party, receiving 122,388 votes or 0.09% of the total.

== Early life and education ==
Goode was born in Richmond, Virginia, the son of Alice Clara (born Besecker) and Virgil Hamlin Goode Sr. However, he has spent most of his life in Rocky Mount, south of Roanoke.

His father served in the Virginia House of Delegates from 1940 to 1948 and as commonwealth's attorney of Franklin County from 1948 to 1972; between them, father and son represented Franklin County at either the local, state or federal level with only one year's interruption from 1940 to 2009. Goode graduated with a B.A. from the University of Richmond (Phi Beta Kappa) and with a J.D. from the University of Virginia School of Law. He also is a member of Lambda Chi Alpha fraternity and served in the Army National Guard from 1969 to 1975.

== Virginia Senate ==
Goode grew up as a Democrat. He entered politics soon after graduating from law school. At the age of 27, he won a special election to the state Senate from a Southside district as an independent after the death of the multi-term Democratic incumbent, William F. Stone. One of Goode's major campaign focuses was advocacy for the Equal Rights Amendment. Soon after being elected, he joined the Democrats.

Goode was very conservative even by Virginia Democratic standards of the time. As such, he wore his party ties very loosely. He supported the tobacco industry, worrying that "his elderly mother would be denied 'the one last pleasure' of smoking a cigarette on her hospital deathbed." Goode ardently defended gun rights while also enthusiastically supporting L. Douglas Wilder, who later became the first elected black governor of Virginia. At the Democratic Party's state political convention in 1985, Goode nominated Wilder for lieutenant governor. However, while governor, Wilder cracked down on gun sales in the state.

After the 1995 elections resulted in a 20–20 split between Democrats and Republicans in the State Senate, Goode seriously considered voting with the Republicans on organizing the chamber. Had he done so, the State Senate would have been under Republican control for the first time since Reconstruction (Republicans ultimately won control outright in 1999). Goode's actions at the time "forced his party to share power with Republican lawmakers in the state legislature," which further upset the Democratic Party.

== U.S. Senate elections ==
=== 1982 ===
Independent incumbent U.S. Senator Harry F. Byrd Jr. decided to retire. Goode ran for the seat, but lost the nomination, getting just 8% of the vote. Lieutenant Governor Richard Joseph Davis won the convention with 64% of the vote. Davis lost the general election by a two-point margin.

=== 1994 ===
He decided to run for the U.S. Senate again in 1994, to challenge incumbent Democratic U.S. Senator Chuck Robb in the Democratic primary. He angered much of the leadership of the Virginia Democratic Party during his second run. On June 14, Robb defeated Goode 58% to 34%.

== U.S. House of Representatives ==
=== Elections ===
1996

When incumbent Democratic U.S. Congressman Lewis Payne decided to retire in 1996, Goode won the Democratic nomination to succeed him. His state senate district was virtually co-extensive with the southern portion of the congressional district. He defeated Republican nominee George Landrith, an attorney, 61% to 36%.

1998

Goode won re-election to a second term unopposed.

2000

Prior to the election, Goode switched from a Democrat to an independent. He portrayed himself as a congressman who was "as independent as the people he serves." He won re-election to a third term with 67% of the vote.

2002

For the 2001 congressional redistricting, Goode allied with Republican Bob Goodlatte and Democrat Rick Boucher to ensure that none of them would be put in the same district. Goode's home in Franklin County is only about 20 mi (32 km) south of Goodlatte's home in Roanoke, the heart of the 6th district. The counties to the west of Franklin County were in Boucher's 9th District, which had to expand due to lack of population growth.

Having become a Republican in August 2002, Goode won the Republican nomination and won re-election to a fourth term with 63% of the vote. He was the first Republican to represent this district since 1889.

2004

He won re-election to a fifth term with 64% of the vote, defeating Vietnam War veteran and businessman Al Weed.

2006

He won re-election to a sixth term with 59% of the vote against Weed again.

2008

Goode lost his seat in 2008, to Democrat Tom Perriello by 727 votes (0.24% of over 316,000 votes cast). While Goode won 13 of the district's 20 counties and independent cities, the race was decided in the district's more urbanized areas. Goode won only one independent city in the district, Bedford, but by only 16 votes. Ultimately, Goode could not overcome a combined 19,000-vote deficit in the Charlottesville area (Charlottesville and surrounding Albemarle County), where Perriello is from. Goode mostly held his own in the district's strongly conservative southwestern portion, parts of which he had represented for 35 years at the state and federal level.

2010

Goode had filed paperwork with the Federal Election Committee to allow him to raise money for a possible rematch in the 2010 elections, due to receiving "unsolicited" campaign contributions, though he said he had not decided whether or not he would run in 2010. However, Goode announced in late July 2009 that he would not seek the Republican nomination for the seat in 2010. Nonetheless, many expected this race to be heavily targeted by the Republican Party in 2010; it was won by Republican Robert Hurt that year.

=== Tenure ===
During his first two terms, he compiled one of the most conservative records of any Democrat in the Congress. Like many Southern Democrats, Goode strongly opposed abortion and gun control and vigorously supported the tobacco industry. His contrarian streak resulted in him being isolated within the Democratic caucus, which later led to him switching parties.

Goode came under considerable fire shortly after being unopposed for a second term in 1998, when he voted for three of the four articles of impeachment against Bill Clinton. In January 2000, he declared himself an independent and began caucusing with the Republicans, who gave him a seat on the Appropriations Committee. Republicans had been lobbying him to switch parties since 1998. Reflecting on Goode's record at the time, David Brown, the mayor of Charlottesville and a former chairman of the city's Democratic Party said "It was obvious he didn't really fit in the Democratic Party anymore." He officially joined the GOP in August 2002.

Goode's primary policy initiatives were opposition to amnesty for undocumented immigrants, veterans' healthcare, and the enactment in 2004 of a $9.6 billion (~$15.7 billion in 2025) buyout for tobacco farmers. Goode has sponsored legislation to permit deployment of the U.S. Armed Forces to the U.S.-Mexico border. He voted in 2002 to authorize the Iraq War and in support of an $87 billion (~$149 billion in 2025) Iraq War supplemental spending bill.

Goode is an advocate of a federal prohibition of online poker. In 2006, he cosponsored H.R. 4777, the Internet Gambling Prohibition Act.

Goode voted in 2007 against a resolution opposing the increase in troop numbers in Iraq, saying that he didn't want to "aid and assist the Islamic jihadists who want the green flag of the crescent and star to wave over the Capitol of the United States and over the White House of this country" and that "radical Muslims" wanted to control the world and put "In Muhammad We Trust" on American currency.

Liberty caucus

Goode served on the Liberty Caucus (sometimes called the Liberty Committee), a group of libertarian-leaning congressional representatives. Other members at that time included Ron Paul of Texas, Jimmy Duncan of Tennessee, Walter B. Jones of North Carolina, Roscoe Bartlett of Maryland, Scott Garrett of New Jersey, Zach Wamp of Tennessee, and Jeff Flake of Arizona.

MZM

In 2005, Goode faced questions when a major corporate campaign donor, defense contractor MZM, Inc., was implicated in a bribery scandal that resulted in the criminal conviction and resignation of California congressman Randy "Duke" Cunningham. Although Goode insisted that his relations with MZM were motivated solely by his interest in bringing high-paying skilled jobs to his district, in December of that year he donated the $88,000 received in MZM contributions to regional charities.

On July 21, 2006 Richard Berglund, a former supervisor of the Martinsville, Virginia office of MZM Inc., pleaded guilty to making illegal donations to Goode's campaign. Court papers indicated that Berglund and MZM owner Mitchell Wade (who previously pleaded guilty) engaged in a scheme to reimburse MZM employees for campaign donations. There was no allegation of wrongdoing on the part of Goode's campaign.

2006 Qur'an controversy

In 2006, Minnesota's 5th congressional district elected Keith Ellison as the first Muslim to serve in the U.S. House of Representatives. Some criticized Ellison's intended use of the Qur'an once owned by Thomas Jefferson at a private swearing-in ceremony; among them, Goode was vocal in his opposition to Ellison's plan. One of Goode's constituents posted a letter online from the congressman regarding Ellison. The letter reads in part:

When I raise my hand to take the oath on Swearing In Day, I will have the Bible in my other hand. I do not subscribe to using the Koran in any way. The Muslim Representative from Minnesota was elected by the voters of that district and if American citizens don't wake up and adopt the Virgil Goode position on immigration there will likely be many more Muslims elected to office and demanding the use of the Koran.

Ellison criticized Goode for this letter, stating that he is not an immigrant and that Goode does not understand Islam. Ellison also offered to meet with Goode to discuss the matter. On his first day in office, Ellison sought out Goode and initiated a cordial exchange on the House floor.

In interviews around that time, Goode stated that he was in favor of decreasing legal immigration to the United States and that he wanted to do away with Diversity Immigrant Visas. Goode argued that such visas would allow people "not from European countries" or from "some terrorist states" to enter America. Goode also repeated his views on a January 1, 2007 post to the USA Today blog.

Hummer accusation

At the 2008 Independence Day parade in Scottsville, Virginia, independent supporters of Goode drove a Hummer H3 decorated with signs promoting Goode and Robert B. Bell. With gas prices at $4 a gallon, a supporter of Goode's opponent, Tom Perriello, put video of the parade on YouTube, accusing Goode of being out of touch with ordinary citizens grappling with the high cost of fuel.

Goode never rode in the Hummer, and is not known to have had anything to do with it, but he was widely portrayed as having both owned and operated the vehicle. He was lampooned on The Daily Show for the story.

North Theatre controversy

The United States Department of Housing and Urban Development grant that Goode assisted in bringing to the North Theatre project was received by the North Theatre organization in 2005.

The Danville Register & Bee reported that Goode's press secretary as well as his wife Lucy were both on the founding board of the North Theatre. Virgil Goode checked with the House ethics committee, before Duncan or his wife Lucy went onto the North Theatre board. In the light of the controversy, Lucy Goode stepped down from the board.

In 2003, Duncan told the Register & Bee he didn't see any conflict with the earmarked dollars. "I don't even know how a question of a conflict even arises," he said.

Sabato earmark controversy

In June 2009, it was revealed that political scientist Larry Sabato, of the Center for Politics, had been the recipient of over $7 million in earmark money from Goode, who Sabato predicted would win re-election in 2008, despite declining poll numbers; Goode ultimately lost the race by a small margin. Some observers have suggested that Sabato should have revealed his financial connection to Goode or recused himself from making predictions about the race.

=== Committee assignments ===
- House Appropriations Committee

== 2012 presidential campaign ==
In November 2010, Goode joined the executive committee of the Constitution Party, having previously been a member of the party's larger national committee. He told the Roanoke Times in June 2011 that he would "consider [running for the party's presidential nomination] as the year progresses."

Goode filed with the Federal Election Commission (FEC) as a presidential candidate on February 10.

Goode was selected as the party's 2012 presidential nominee on April 21, 2012, at the 2012 Constitution Party National Convention in Nashville, Tennessee.

On October 23, 2012, Virgil Goode, along with Gary Johnson, Jill Stein, and Rocky Anderson participated in a debate moderated by Larry King. Goode lost in a poll conducted after the debate to decide who would face off in a runoff debate.

== Electoral history ==
Virginia's 5th congressional district: Results 1996–2008
Year	Subject	Party	Votes	Pct	Opponent	Party	Votes	Pct		Opponent	Party	Votes	Pct	
1996	Virgil H. Goode Jr.	Democratic	120,323	61%	George C. Landrith III	Republican	70,869	36%		George R. "Tex" Wood	Virginia Reform	6,627	3%	*
1998	Virgil H. Goode Jr.	Democratic	73,097	99%	Write-ins		785	1%						
2000	Virgil H. Goode Jr.	Independent	143,312	67%	John W. Boyd Jr.	Democratic	65,387	31%		Joseph S. Spence	Independent	3,936	2%	*
2002	Virgil H. Goode Jr.	Republican	95,360	63%	Meredith M. Richards	Democratic	54,805	36%		Write-ins		68	1%	
2004	Virgil H. Goode Jr.	Republican	172,431	64%	Al Weed	Democratic	98,237	36%		Write-ins		90	1%	
2006	Virgil H. Goode Jr.	Republican	125,370	59%	Al Weed	Democratic	84,682	40%		Joseph P. Oddo	Independent Green	1,928	1%	*
2008	Virgil H. Goode Jr.	Republican	158,083	50%	Tom Perriello	Democratic	158,810	50%	*					

*Write-in and minor candidate notes: In 1996, write-ins received 104 votes. In 2000, write-ins received 70 votes. In 2006, write-ins received 99 votes.

== See also ==
- List of American politicians who switched parties in office
- List of United States representatives who switched parties

U.S. House of Representatives
Preceded by Lewis Payne	Member of the U.S. House of Representatives from Virginia's 5th congressional district 1997–2009	Succeeded by Tom Perriello
Party political offices
Preceded by Chuck Baldwin	Constitution nominee for President of the United States; 2012	Succeeded by Darrell Castle
U.S. order of precedence (ceremonial)
Preceded by Tom Davis as Former U.S. Representative	Order of precedence of the United States as Former U.S. Representative	Succeeded by Raymond J. McGrath as Former U.S. Representative
