= Virginia Secretary of Finance =

Secretary of Finance of the Commonwealth of Virginia
- Seal of the Commonwealth of Virginia

- Flag of Virginia

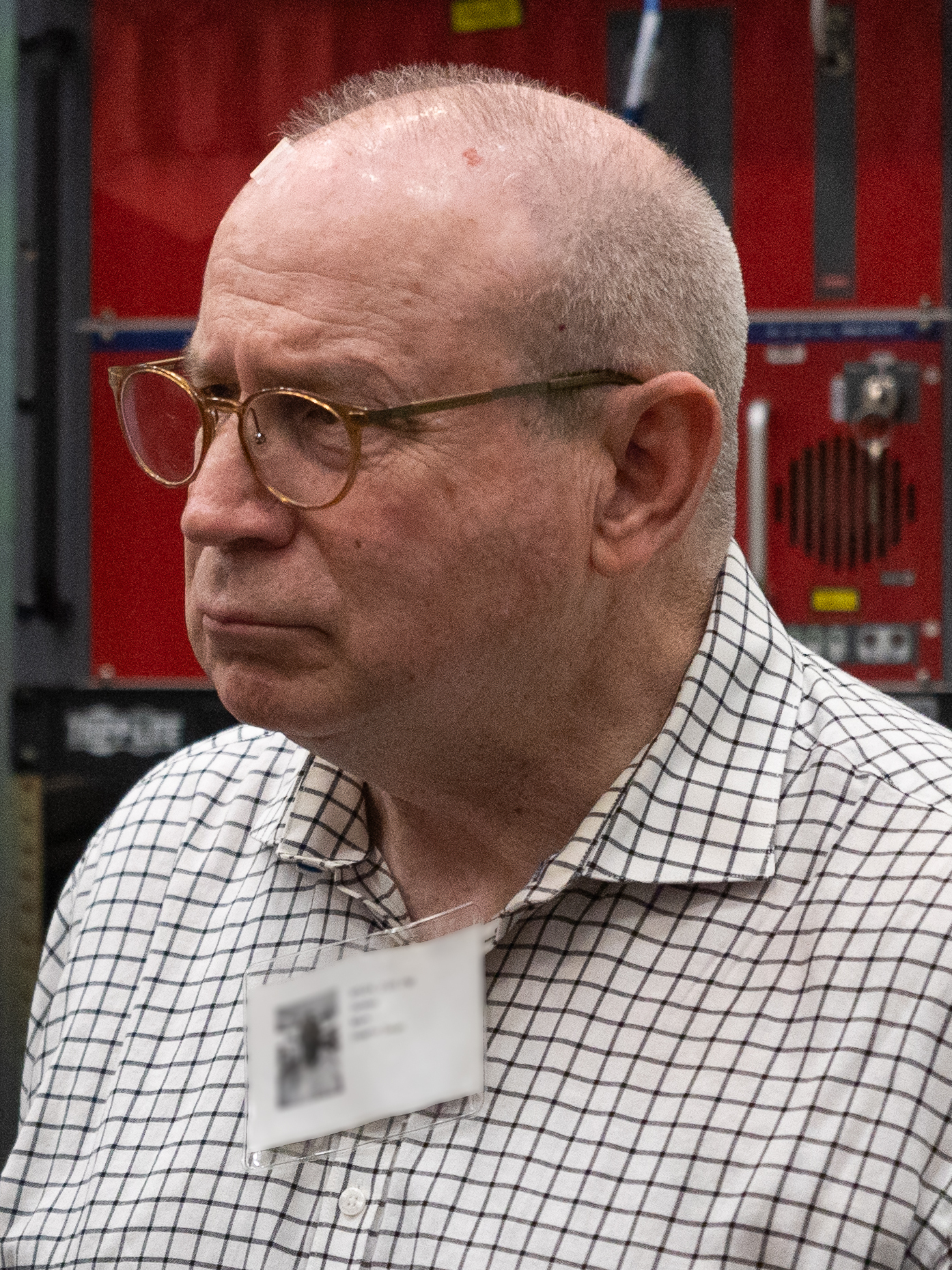
- Incumbent; Mark Sickles since January 17, 2026
- Style: Mr. Secretary
- Member of: Virginia Governor's Cabinet
- Nominator: The governor
- Appointer: The governor with advice and consent from the Senate and House
- Term length: 4 years
- Inaugural holder: Walter Craigie
- Formation: April 8, 1972
- Website: finance.virginia.gov

The secretary of finance is a member of the Virginia Governor's Cabinet.

== Duties ==
The Secretary is responsible for all financial matters in the Commonwealth of Virginia, and oversees the following agencies:

- Virginia Department of Accounts
- Virginia Department of Planning and Budget
- Virginia Department of Taxation
- Virginia Department of Treasury
- Virginia Unclaimed Property Division
- Virginia Resources Authority
- Virginia Board of Accountacy

== List of secretaries ==
=== Finance (July 1, 1972–July 1, 1976) ===
- Walter Craigie (1972–1973)
- William H. Forst (1973–1974)
- Maurice B. Rowe III (1974–1976)

=== Administration and finance (July 1, 1976–July 1, 1984) ===
- Maurice B. Rowe III (1976–1978)
- Charles Walker (1978–1981)
- Stuart Connock (1981–1982)
- Wayne F. Anderson (1982–1984)

=== Finance (July 1, 1984–present) ===
- Stuart Connock (1984–1990)
- Paul W. Timmreck (1990–1996)
- Ronald L. Tillett (1996–2001)
- John W. Forbes II (2001–2002)
- John M. Bennett (2002–2006)
- Jody Wagner (2006–2008)
- Ric Brown (2008–2018)
- Aubrey Layne (2018–2021)
- Joe Flores (2021–2022)
- Stephen E. Cummings (2022–2026)
- Mark Sickles (2026–present)
