= Jody Wagner =

American politician

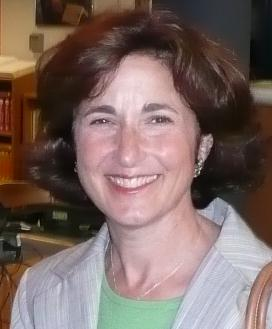

12th Secretary of Finance of Virginia
- In office January 15, 2006 – August 8, 2008
- Governor: Tim Kaine
- Preceded by: John M. Bennett
- Succeeded by: Ric Brown

Treasurer of Virginia
- In office January 2002 – January 15, 2006
- Governor: Mark Warner
- Preceded by: Mary G. Morris
- Succeeded by: Braxton Powell

Personal details
- Born: Jody Moses Wagner; August 6, 1955 (age 70); Canton, Ohio, U.S.
- Political party: Democratic
- Spouse: Alan Wagner
- Children: 4
- Education: Northwestern University (BA); Vanderbilt University (JD)
- Website: Official website

Jody Moses Wagner (born August 6, 1955) is an American politician from Virginia Beach, Virginia. A Democrat, she served as State Treasurer of Virginia from January 2002 to January 2006, and as Virginia Secretary of Finance in the Cabinet of Governor Tim Kaine from January 2006 to August 2008. She was an unsuccessful candidate for the United States House of Representatives in Virginia's 2nd congressional district in the 2000 election She was the Democratic Party nominee for Lieutenant Governor of Virginia in the 2009 election, and was defeated by Republican incumbent Bill Bolling.

== Personal life ==
Wagner received a B.A. in economics from Northwestern University in 1977, and a J.D. from Vanderbilt University School of Law in 1980. She was admitted to the bar in Tennessee in 1980 and in Virginia in 1984. Prior to her appointment to state government, she worked for about 18 years at the Norfolk law firm Kaufman & Canoles, specializing in securities and banking law. She has been a board member of the Norfolk Foundation and the Sorensen Institute for Political Leadership. She is a former president of the Jewish Family Services of Tidewater and former board member of the Eastern Virginia Medical School.

In September 2005, Wagner and her husband, Dr. Alan Wagner, an ophthalmologist, began a side business making gourmet popcorn.

== Political career ==
In 2000, Wagner was the Democratic nominee in Virginia's 2nd congressional district following the retirement of Democratic Representative Owen B. Pickett. She lost the race to Republican Ed Schrock, a Virginia state senator, despite roughly matching Schrock in fundraising and showing unexpected strength in a Republican-leaning district.

In January 2002, Wagner was appointed by Virginia Governor Mark Warner as Treasurer of Virginia, an office within the Secretariat of Finance. During her tenure in that position, she was elected President of the National Association of State Treasurers, and upon leaving the position, she told The Washington Post that her "major accomplishment" in the position was preserving Virginia's AAA bond rating. She also told the publication at that time of her efforts "to modernize the state's treasury functions".

In December 2005, incoming Virginia governor Tim Kaine announced Wagner as the state's first female Secretary of Finance. She was succeeded as state treasurer by deputy state treasurer Braxton Powell.

Wagner resigned as Secretary of Finance effective August 8, 2008, and was succeeded in that post by state budget director Ric Brown. A week later, on August 15, she announced her candidacy for lieutenant governor in the 2009 election. She won the June 9, 2009 primary. She lost the general election to Republican incumbent Bill Bolling.

On the filing deadline of June 9, 2020, Wagner announced she would run for Mayor of Virginia Beach in the November 2020 election against incumbent Bobby Dyer. Dyer's previous opponent, City Councilman Aaron Rouse, ended his campaign on May 30. By June 20, 2020, Wagner had outraised Dyer, $75,453 to $67,225. She was defeated in the November election by Dyer.

Political offices
Preceded by Mary G. Morris	Treasurer of Virginia; 2002–2006	Succeeded by Braxton Powell
Preceded by John M. Bennett	Secretary of Finance of Virginia; 2006–2008	Succeeded by Ric Brown
