= The News Leader =

Newspaper in Virginia, USA

- The July 27, 2005, front page of The News Leader
- Type: Daily newspaper
- Format: Broadsheet
- Owner: USA Today Co.
- Editor: William Hitchcock Ramsey III
- Founded: 1904 (with heritage dating to 1890)
- Headquarters: 11 North Central Avenue; Staunton, Virginia 24401; United States
- Circulation: 6,146 Daily; 6,721 Sunday (as of 2021)
- ISSN: 0747-2501
- OCLC number: 10662899
- Website: newsleader.com

The News Leader is a daily newspaper owned by USA Today Co. and serving Staunton, Virginia, and the surrounding areas. It was founded in 1904 by Brig. Gen. Hierome L. Opie as The Evening Leader.

== History ==
While it traces its founding to Opie in 1904, the paper had a predecessor, The Daily News, which was founded in 1890. Opie worked as a reporter for The Daily News, which was a morning paper, before starting The Evening Leader. In 1919, Opie bought The Daily News and combined it with The Morning Leader, a paper that he had started to compete directly with The News.

The combined paper was called The Staunton News-Leader. When the papers were combined, the new edition adopted the volume number of The Daily News and so the current edition's volume number goes back further than the 1904 founding date. In the 1960s, the Opie family combined The Staunton News-Leader with The Evening Leader, and Staunton was left with only one daily newspaper, The Daily News Leader. "Daily" was dropped from the name in 2002.

The Opies sold the paper in 1979 to Multimedia Inc., which was purchased by Gannett Co. in 1995. The newspaper launched its online edition in 2001.
