= George Benson Fox =

American politician (1843–1924)

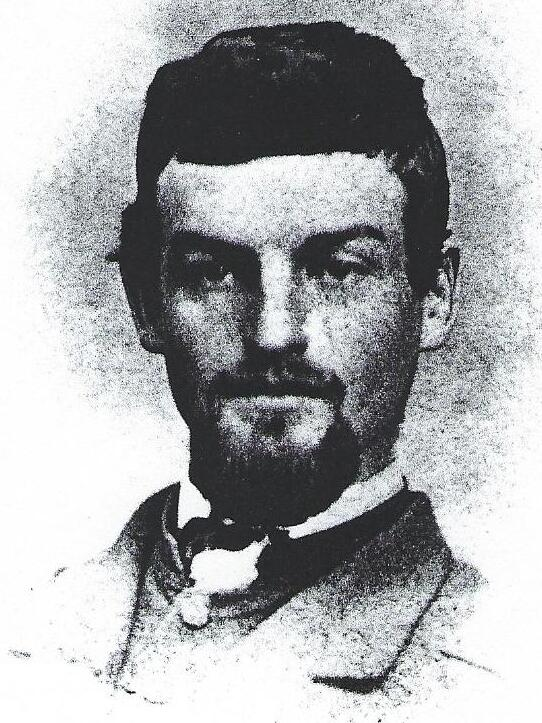
Major George Benson Fox

George Benson Fox (June 5, 1843 – September 20, 1924) was a United States Army officer, American industrialist, and political figure from Wyoming, Ohio, who served in the 75th Ohio Volunteer Infantry during the American Civil War, and later in the Ohio General Assembly.

== Early life ==
George Benson Fox was born June 5, 1843, in Wyoming, Ohio and attended Ohio Wesleyan University from 1859 to 1861 where he was a member of Beta Theta Pi fraternity.

== Career ==
=== Civil War ===
Fox left college in 1861 enlisting in the Union Army as a private in the 11th Regiment Indiana Volunteers, then transferring to Company A of the 75th Ohio Volunteer Infantry. He was elected 2nd Lieutenant on November 5, 1861, and on September 12, 1862, was promoted to 1st Lieutenant, then to Captain on December 3, 1862. Fox became a Major in the 75th Ohio Volunteer Infantry on June 11, 1863, and acted as the regiment's commander after Colonel Charles W. Friend resigned.

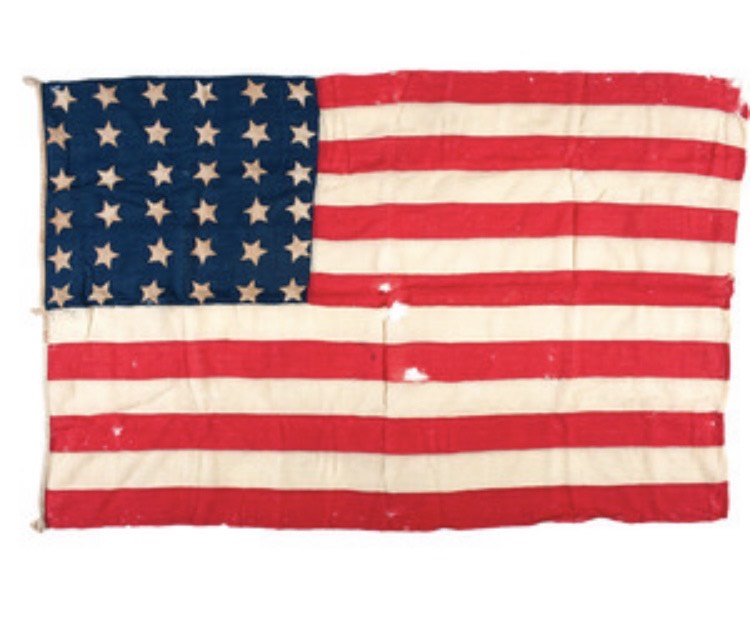
36-Star Flag Presented to George Benson Fox by Wyoming, OH

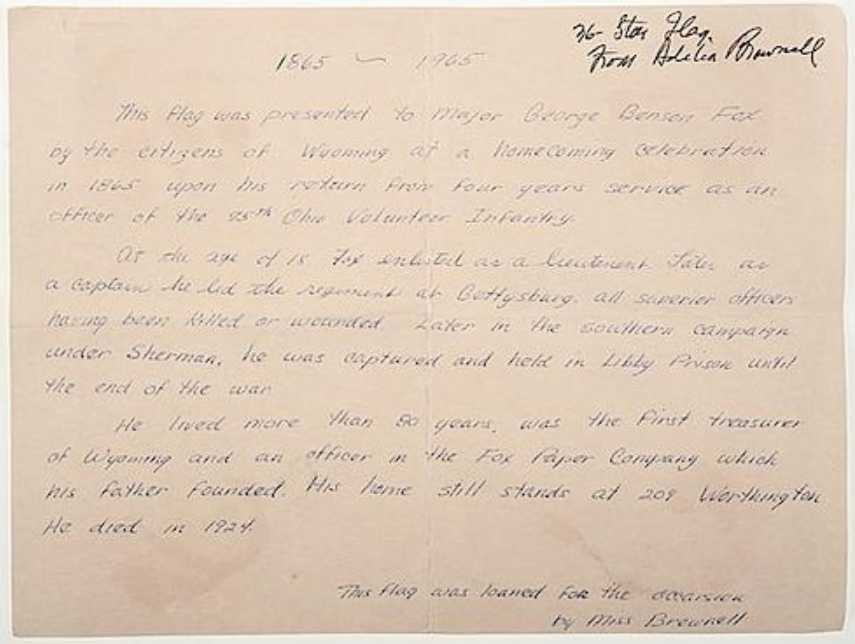
36-Star Flag Description by Adelia Brownell

The 75th Ohio Infantry fought in many of the most notable battles in the Civil War's Eastern Theatre, including McDowell, Cross Keys, Cedar Mountain, Second Bull Run, Chancellorsville, Gettysburg, and the siege operations against Charleston, SC. Fox took command of the 75th Ohio Volunteers at the Battle of Gettysburg in July 1863, as Colonel Andrew L. Harris and other superior officers were wounded or killed in battle; and specifically in consequence of commander J.C. Mulharen having been killed.

Late in the southern campaign under General William Sherman, Fox was captured by Confederates at the Battle of Gainesville on August 17, 1864, and held as a prisoner of war at Libby Prison for seven months until March 18, 1865.

In 1865 upon return from four years service in the Civil War, the citizens of Wyoming, Ohio gave a homecoming celebration where they presented Fox a 36-star flag. Several years after the war, Fox and his wife returned to visit Libby Prison. In a corner of the room he was imprisoned, he requested his guide pry up the floorboards revealing a hole leading to a passage he and fellow prisoners had been digging as an escape tunnel.

=== Business and political ===
After returning from war, Fox went into the starch manufacturing business originally founded in 1824 by his grandfather, George Fox (1775-1845). His father Thomas Fox (1822-1903), and uncle George Fox (1826-1895) operated the starch business from 1842 until 1863, having moved it to Lockland, OH in 1856 renaming "Larkin, Fox and Brothers". Thomas Fox subsequently began embarking into paper manufacturing, while George continued the starch business later incorporating "The Geo. Fox Starch Manufacturing Co." in 1876.

George Benson Fox followed his father Thomas Fox of Lockland, Ohio (505 W. Wyoming Ave.) into the paper manufacturing industry when he purchased a paper mill in 1865 with C.W. Friend, incorporated in 1873 as "Friend & Fox Paper Company." This Lockland mill (Locks 40, 41, 42, 43) was an additional location to two paper mills operated by the company in Crescentville, OH (Sharonville) (Lock 39) and Rialto, OH (West Chester) (Lock 38) eight miles north of Lockland on the Miami–Erie Canal. Friend lived in Wyoming at the Riddle-Friend House on Springfield Pike adjacent to Wyoming Ave.

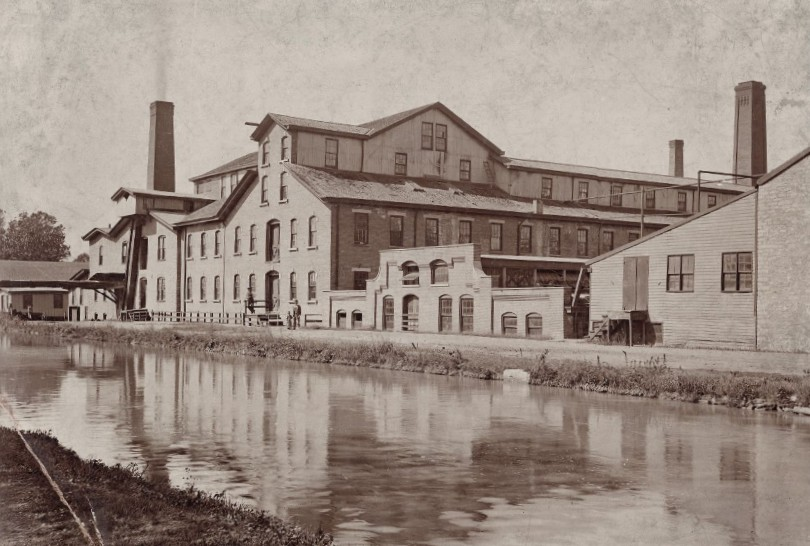
Friend & Fox Paper Mill c.1880 Lockland, OH on the Miami and Erie Canal

In 1900, the Friend & Fox Paper Company changed its name to that of "Fox Paper Company" where George B. Fox held positions as secretary, treasurer, and president, also serving on its Board of Directors.

Fox served as the first treasurer of the village of Wyoming, Ohio, then later served in the Ohio Senate from 1888 to 1890 and was elected to the Ohio General Assembly in 1894. In 1909, he was awarded an honorary Master of Arts degree from Ohio Wesleyan University. In conferring this degree, President Herbert George Welch stated, “George Benson Fox was one of those whose college course was disrupted fifty years ago (approximation) by the call to arms. He gave distinguished service in war, and has lived worthily in peace.”

== Civil War correspondence ==
A historically significant collection of approximately 80 letters Fox wrote from many of the most notable battlefields of the Civil War where the 75th Ohio Volunteer Infantry fought is archived at the Cincinnati History Library and Archives at the Cincinnati Museum Center. The letters span from October 1, 1861, at Paducah, KY through November 8, 1863, at Folly Island, SC.

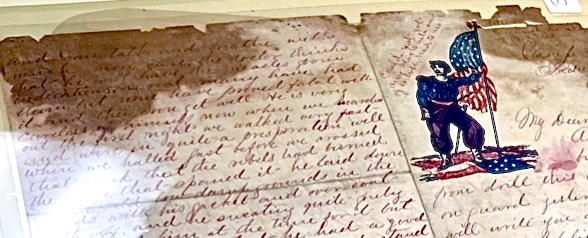
G Benson Fox Civil War Letter

In 2022, a grant was received from the W.E. Smith Family Charitable Trust to digitize and copy these letters, of which countless historians and students have used in research and preservation of Civil War history.

The collection was purchased by the Cincinnati History Library on August 29, 1940, and subsequently arranged and catalogued in February 1984, noting: "These letters are extremely interesting because of their fullness and detail. Fox portrays a vivid picture of everyday life in a Civil War Regiment, with its humor as well as tragedy." "Fox's letters to his parents reveal his views on the enemy, conscription, emancipation, and the battle of Gettysburg, as well as the more mundane concerns of a soldier."

It is one of few collections anywhere with documents actually written from the battlefield at Gettysburg. "Fox's description of Army life and bureaucracy are just as vividly recounted as the major engagements. By reading these letters one can get a very real sense of what life was like during that tumultuous time."

There is a long gap in the letters from April 2 to July 4, 1863, which is unfortunate as there likely would have been a letter from the Battle of Chancellorsville that could have existed at one time; notable as Robert Reily, Colonel in the 75th Ohio Volunteers and "Father of Wyoming, OH", was killed in this battle. The Cincinnati Museum Center has exhibited Fox's letters several times since purchasing the collection in 1940, most especially his letter from the Gettysburg battlefield.

== Personal life ==
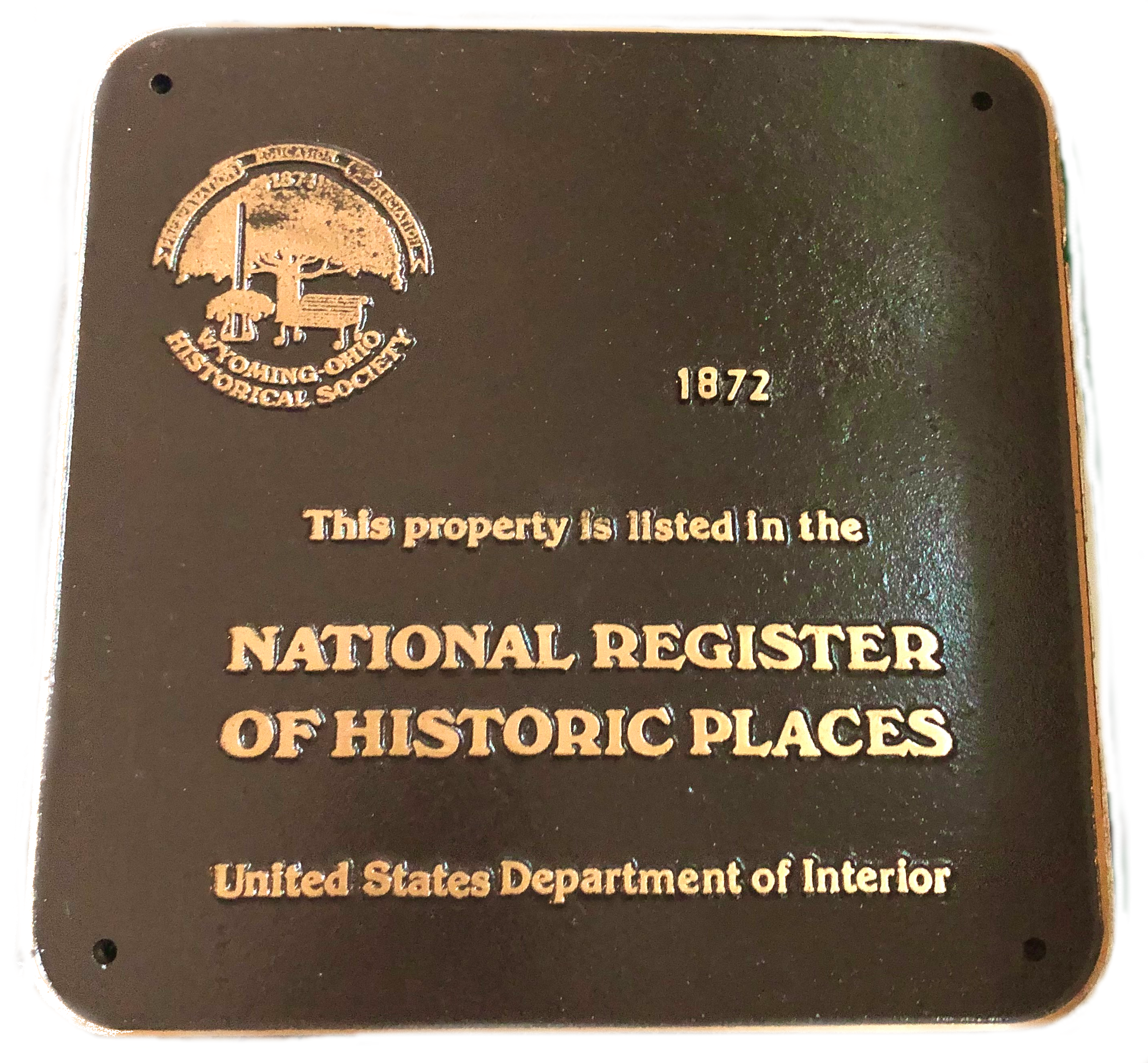
209 Worthington Ave. Historical Marker Plaque

Fox built and lived at 209 Worthington Avenue in Wyoming, Ohio, from 1872 until his death in 1924, which is located within Wyoming, OH's Village Historic District and is listed on the United States Department of Interior's National Register of Historic Places since 1986. His second wife, Frances Bachelor Fox (m. 1884), continued to live at the home until her subsequent passing in 1940.

George B. and Frances B. Bachelor Fox had one child, George Benson Fox, Jr. “Benson Fox” who lived to be only 28 years old (September 6, 1899 - January 13, 1928), dying at a young age due to pulmonary tuberculosis. Fox was originally married to Sallie T. Donaldson until her death in 1875.

Fox was a member of the Wayne Avenue Methodist Episcopal Church in Lockland, Ohio, which his father was a founding member. In the 1950s the congregation moved to Springfield Pike in Wyoming, OH later becoming Friendship United Methodist Church. Fox was also member of the Freemasons, Graves Post, Grand Army of the Republic, and the Royal Legion.

== Death ==
Fox died September 20, 1924 (age 81) in Wyoming, Ohio due to myocarditis. He is buried at Spring Grove Cemetery in Cincinnati, Ohio – (Garden LN, Section 53, Lot 24A, Space 15), where his father Thomas Fox had purchased a Family Lot eventually containing 24 grave sites.
