= Twin Oaks (Wyoming, Ohio) =

- Twin Oaks; Robert Reily House
- U.S. National Register of Historic Places
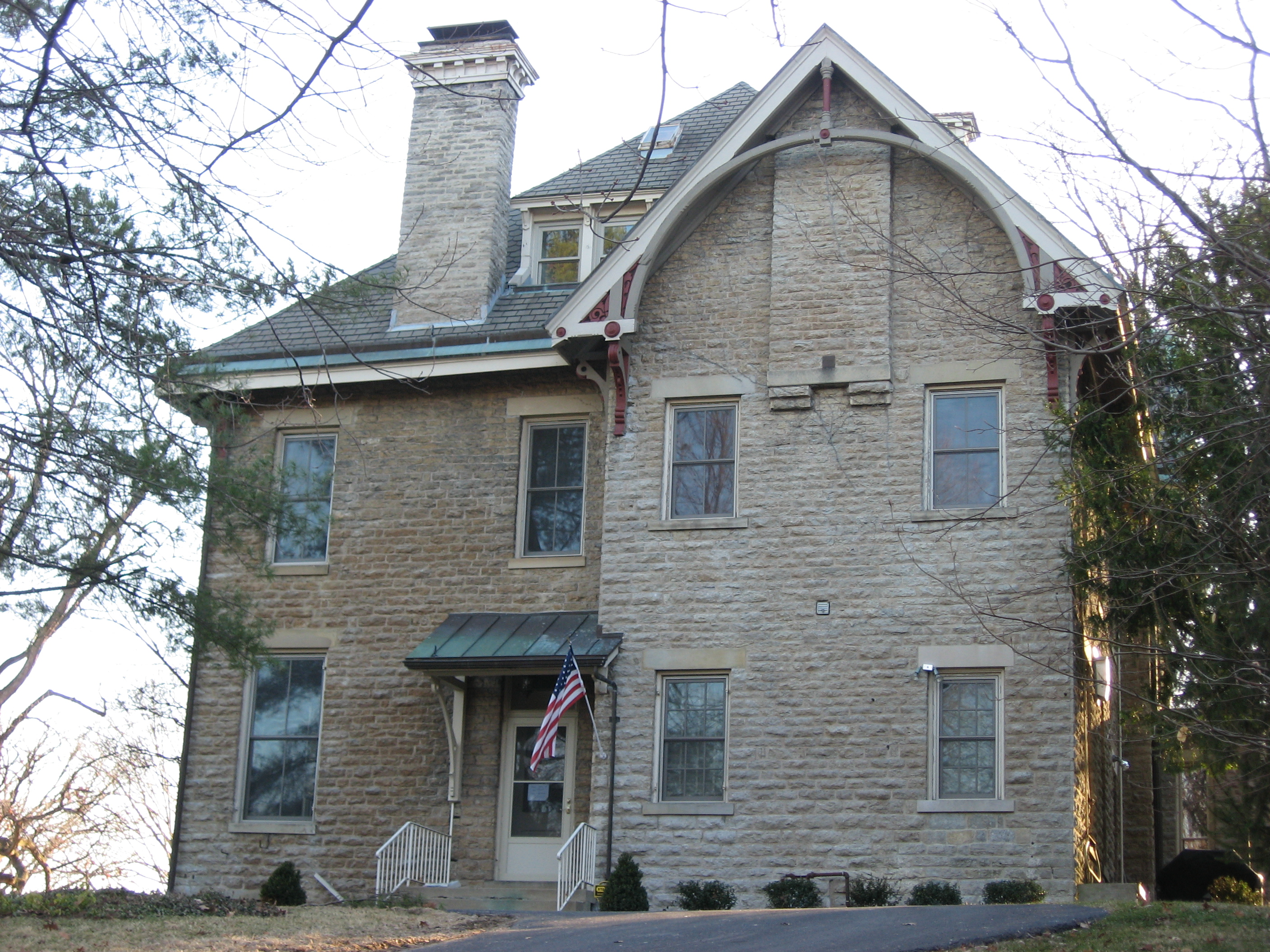
- Front of Twin Oaks

- Location within Ohio Location within the United States
- Location: 629 Liddle Lane, Wyoming, Ohio
- Coordinates: 39°13′46″N 84°28′53″W
- Area: 0.6 acres (0.2 ha)
- Built: 1854
- Architectural style: Gothic Revival, Queen Anne
- MPS: Wyoming MRA
- NRHP reference No.: 75001438 and 86001640
- Added to NRHP: May 29, 1975 and August 25, 1986

Twin Oaks, also known as the "Robert Reily House", is a historically significant residence in the city of Wyoming, located near Cincinnati in the southwestern corner of the U.S. state of Ohio. Constructed in the middle of the nineteenth century, it was the home of Robert Reily, one of the leading citizens of early Wyoming. Its heavy stone architecture features a mix of two important architectural styles of the period, and it has been named a historic site.

== Architecture ==
Although the cores of its walls are brick, Twin Oaks is primarily a stone building with a stone foundation and a slate roof; minor elements of iron are present, along with wooden trim. Two and a half stories tall, it is topped with a hip roof; the general style is Queen Anne, although when built it was much closer to the typical Gothic Revival residence. The facade is divided into two bays, with two windows in each; the bay on the right (as seen from the street) rises to a gable and is pierced by four windows, while the left bay stops at the normal roofline and features the main entrance. A side entrance with portico is placed farther to the rear, underneath another subsidiary gable.

== Historic context ==
Good transportation is a leading reason for Wyoming's prosperity. The city lies near the old pre-statehood road that connected Cincinnati with locations farther north, such as Fort Hamilton and Fallen Timbers. Curves in the road were cut off in 1806, forming a new road that is today followed by Springfield Pike through central Wyoming. Improvements in the 1830s only enhanced its importance. By this time, another mode of transportation had become significant: the Miami and Erie Canal was built a short distance to the east in 1828, and the village of Lockland grew up along its side. Railroads reached the city in 1851 with the construction of the Cincinnati, Hamilton, and Dayton Railroad on the border between Lockland and Wyoming.

Because of Wyoming's proximity to the industry of Lockland, its easy transportation to the booming city of Cincinnati, and its pleasant scenery, many wealthy industrialists purchased local farms and built grand country houses. Most such houses were built in the Wyoming Hills area, west of Springfield Pike; growth in this area continued until the coming of the Great Depression.

== Robert Reily ==
Born in 1820 in Butler County to the north, Robert Reily was the son of pioneer educator John Reily, who started Cincinnati's earliest school in 1790 after military service during the American Revolution. Young Reily went into business at a comparatively young age, finding employment at a store that sold imported textiles; he began as a clerk, but he eventually rose to become the owner before selling the business and retiring in 1859, aged less than forty years.

Reily had the present house built in 1854 on a hilltop above the valley of Mill Creek. The grandest of the old houses in the Wyoming Hills area, it was constructed to be comparable to the Gothic Revival houses that wealthy men were building in Cincinnati at the time. In the early 1860s, when local residents decided to organize their small community and give it a name, Twin Oaks was chosen as the meeting place. Those present were initially unable to agree on a name, but Reily's support for "Wyoming" won over the other men. Shortly after this meeting, Reily entered military service. As lieutenant colonel of the 75th Ohio Volunteer Infantry, he was killed at the Battle of Chancellorsville in 1863.

== Historic site ==
In 1975, Twin Oaks was listed on the National Register of Historic Places; it qualified both because of its historically significant architecture and because of its connection to Robert Reily. Four years later, a local historic preservation group began a citywide survey to identify Wyoming's historic buildings, and this effort culminated with a multiple property submission of eighteen houses, the Wyoming Presbyterian Church, and one historic district to the National Register of Historic Places in 1985. Twin Oaks was one of the houses included in this group; it was listed on the Register for a second time, even though it had never been removed.
