= Battle of McDowell order of battle =

The order of battle for the Battle of McDowell includes:

- Battle of McDowell order of battle: Confederate
- Battle of McDowell order of battle: Union
