= Sean Smith (defensive end) =

American football player (born 1967)

No. 97
- Position: Defensive end

Personal information
- Born: May 29, 1967 (age 59); Cincinnati, Ohio, U.S.
- Listed height: 6 ft 7 in (2.01 m)
- Listed weight: 280 lb (127 kg)

Career information
- High school: Wyoming (Wyoming, Ohio)
- College: Georgia Tech
- NFL draft: 1990: 11th round, 280th overall pick

Career history
- New England Patriots (1990–1991); Atlanta Falcons (1992)*
- * Offseason or practice squad member only

Career NFL statistics
- Sacks: 1.5
- Stats at Pro Football Reference

Sean Warfield Smith (born May 29, 1967) is an American former professional football player who was a defensive end in the National Football League (NFL). He played two seasons for the New England Patriots from 1990 to 1991. He played college football for the Georgia Tech Yellow Jackets and was selected by the Patriots in the 11th round of the 1990 NFL draft.
