= Battle of McDowell order of battle: Union =

The following United States Army units and commanders fought in the Battle of McDowell of the American Civil War. The Confederate order of battle is listed separately.

== Abbreviations used ==
=== Military rank ===
- MG = Major General
- BG = Brigadier General
- Col = Colonel
- Ltc = Lieutenant Colonel
- Maj = Major
- Cpt = Captain

== Mountain Department ==
MG John C. Frémont (not present)

=== Union Forces Around McDowell ===
BG Robert H. Milroy
BG Robert C. Schenck

Brigades	Regiments and Others
Milroy's Brigade BG Robert H. Milroy	25th Ohio Infantry: Col James A. Jones; 32nd Ohio Infantry: Col Thomas H. Ford; 73rd Ohio Infantry: Col Orland Smith; 75th Ohio Infantry: Col Nathaniel McLean; 2nd West Virginia Infantry: Col John W. Moss; 3rd West Virginia Infantry: Col David T. Hewes; Battery I, 1st Ohio Artillery: Cpt Henry F. Hyman; 12th Ohio Battery: Cpt Aaron Johnson; 1st West Virginia Cavalry: Col Henry Anisansel
Schenck's Brigade BG Robert C. Schenck	82nd Ohio Infantry: Col James Cantwell; 5th West Virginia Infantry: Col John L. Ziegler; 55th Ohio Infantry: Col John C. Lee; 1st Battalion, Connecticut Cavalry: Col Brayton Ives; Battery K, 1st Ohio Artillery: Cpt William L. DeBeck
