= Twin Oaks =

Twin Oaks may refer to:

== Localities ==
- Twin Oaks, Kern County, California, an unincorporated community
- Twin Oaks, San Diego County, California, see San Marcos, California
- Twin Oaks, Missouri, a village in St. Louis County
- Twin Oaks, Oklahoma, an unincorporated community and census-designated place in Delaware County
- Twin Oaks Community, Virginia, in Louisa County, Virginia

== Other places ==
- Twin Oaks (Linthicum Heights, Maryland), listed on the NRHP in Anne Arundel County, Maryland
- Twin Oaks (Wyoming, Ohio), listed on the NRHP in Ohio
- Twin Oaks (Washington, D.C.), listed on the NRHP in Washington, D.C.
- Twin Oaks Plantation, a house on the National Register of Historic Places near Eutaw, Alabama
- Stark's Twin Oaks Airpark, A privately owned, public use airport in Hillsboro Oregon
