= Wyoming School District =

Wyoming School District may refer to:

- Wyoming City Schools (Ohio)
- Wyoming Public Schools (Michigan)
