= Angelo Herndon =

American labor organizer (1913–1997)

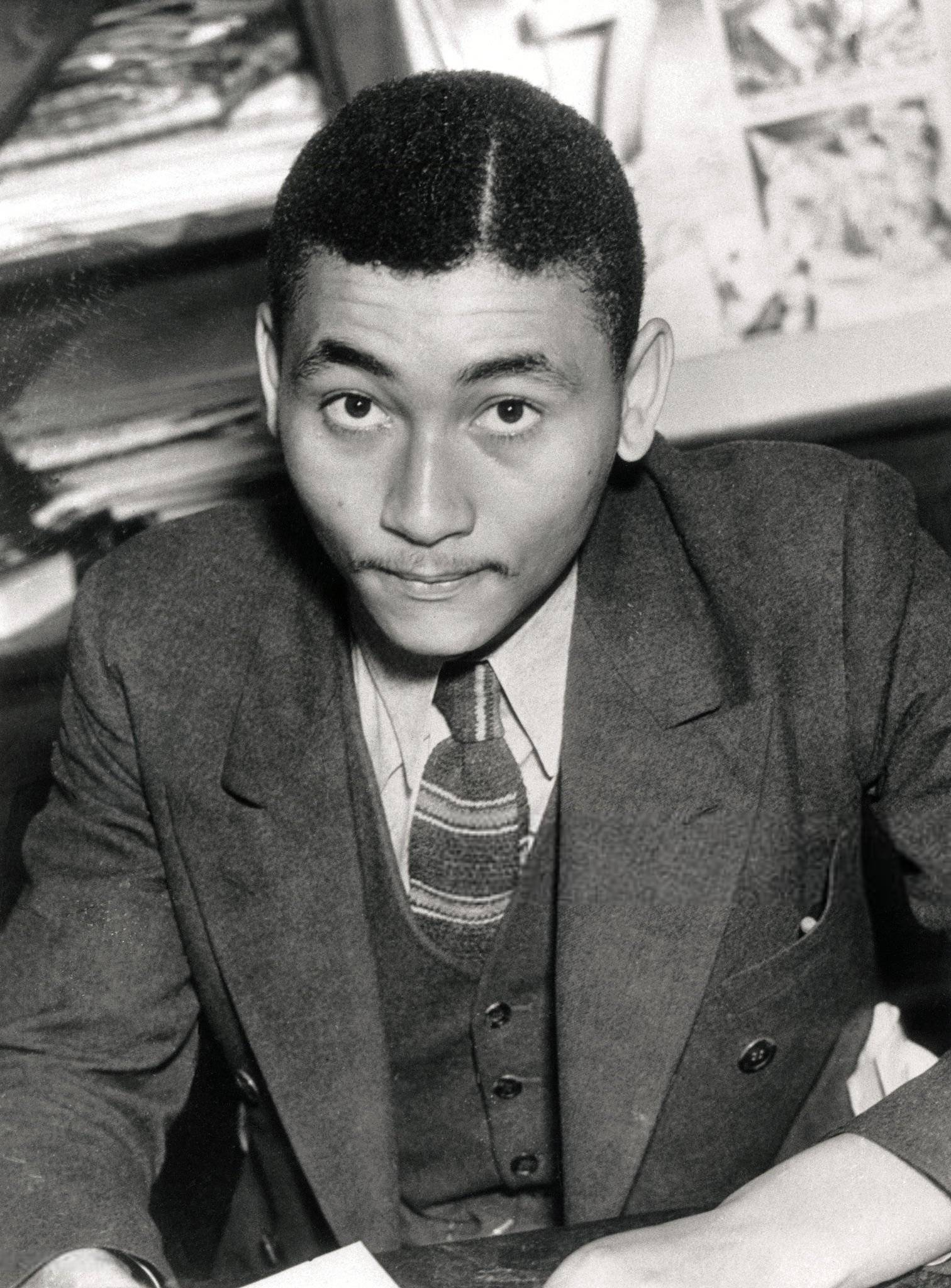
- Herndon c. 1932
- Born: Eugene Angelo Braxton Herndon; May 6, 1913; Wyoming, Ohio, U.S.
- Died: December 9, 1997 (aged 84); Sweet Home, Arkansas, U.S.
- Occupation: Labor organizer
- Known for: Herndon v. Lowry
- Political party: Communist
- Parents: Paul Herndon (father); Hattie Herndon (mother)
- Relatives: Milton Herndon (brother)

Angelo Braxton Herndon (May 6, 1913 – December 9, 1997) was an African-American labor organizer arrested and convicted of insurrection after attempting to organize black and white industrial workers in 1932 in Atlanta, Georgia. The prosecution case rested heavily on Herndon's possession of "communist literature", which police found in his hotel room.

Herndon was defended by the International Labor Defense, the legal arm of the Communist Party of America, which hired two young local attorneys, Benjamin J. Davis Jr. and John H. Geer, and provided guidance. Davis later became prominent in leftist circles. Over a five-year period, Herndon's case twice reached the United States Supreme Court, which ruled that Georgia's insurrection law was unconstitutional, as it violated First Amendment rights of free speech and assembly. Herndon became nationally prominent because of his case, and Southern justice was under review. By the end of the 1940s he left the Communist Party, moved to the Midwest, and lived there quietly.

== Early life and education ==
Born into a poor family in Wyoming in southwestern Ohio, Angelo Herndon endured racial discrimination in his city, where African Americans were a minority. He attended public schools but moved to Kentucky at the age of 14 to work in the mines. By 1930 he was working in Birmingham, Alabama, for the Tennessee Coal, Iron, and Railroad Company.

As a youth, Herndon was given a copy of the Communist Manifesto by a white worker in the Unemployed Councils, a group affiliated with the Communist Party. He was impressed with the Party's campaigning in the South to promote labor reform and interracial cooperation, and its teachings on racial equality and class conflict. He joined the party in 1930. After being arrested several times in Alabama for labor organizing, Herndon was sent to Atlanta, Georgia in the fall of 1931.

== Political activism ==
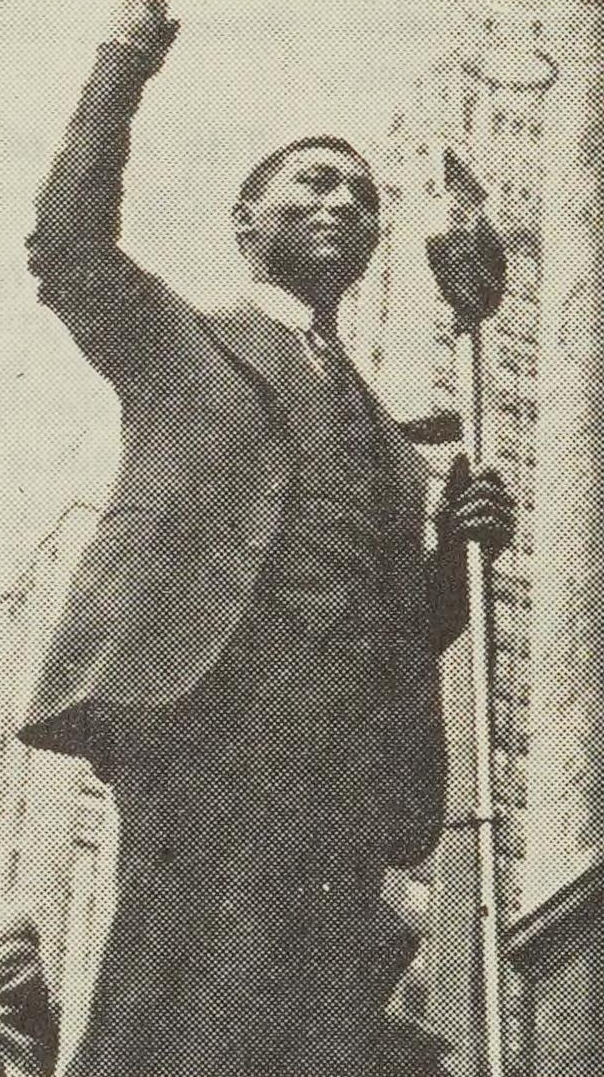
Herndon gives a speech c. 1936

Herndon went to Atlanta as a labor organizer for the Unemployment Council. His involvement with the Communist Party brought him national prominence after he was arrested in Atlanta, convicted of insurrection, and his case twice reached the US Supreme Court on appeal. He campaigned to organize working-class blacks and whites to become politically active. He solicited blacks and whites alike for membership in an integrated Communist Party of Atlanta.

Nearly 1,000 unemployed workers, both black and white, demonstrated at the federal courthouse on June 30, 1932, seeking resumption of relief payments. Officials were alarmed that the protest was biracial, as it crossed the segregated lines of the Jim Crow South. They began to monitor known and suspected radicals, even as the city became more crowded with rural migrants. On July 11, Herndon checked on his mail at the Post Office and was arrested by two Atlanta police detectives. A few days later his hotel room was searched, and Communist Party publications were found. At first, Herndon was charged for being a communist. Then, Herndon was charged with insurrection under a Georgia Reconstruction era law.

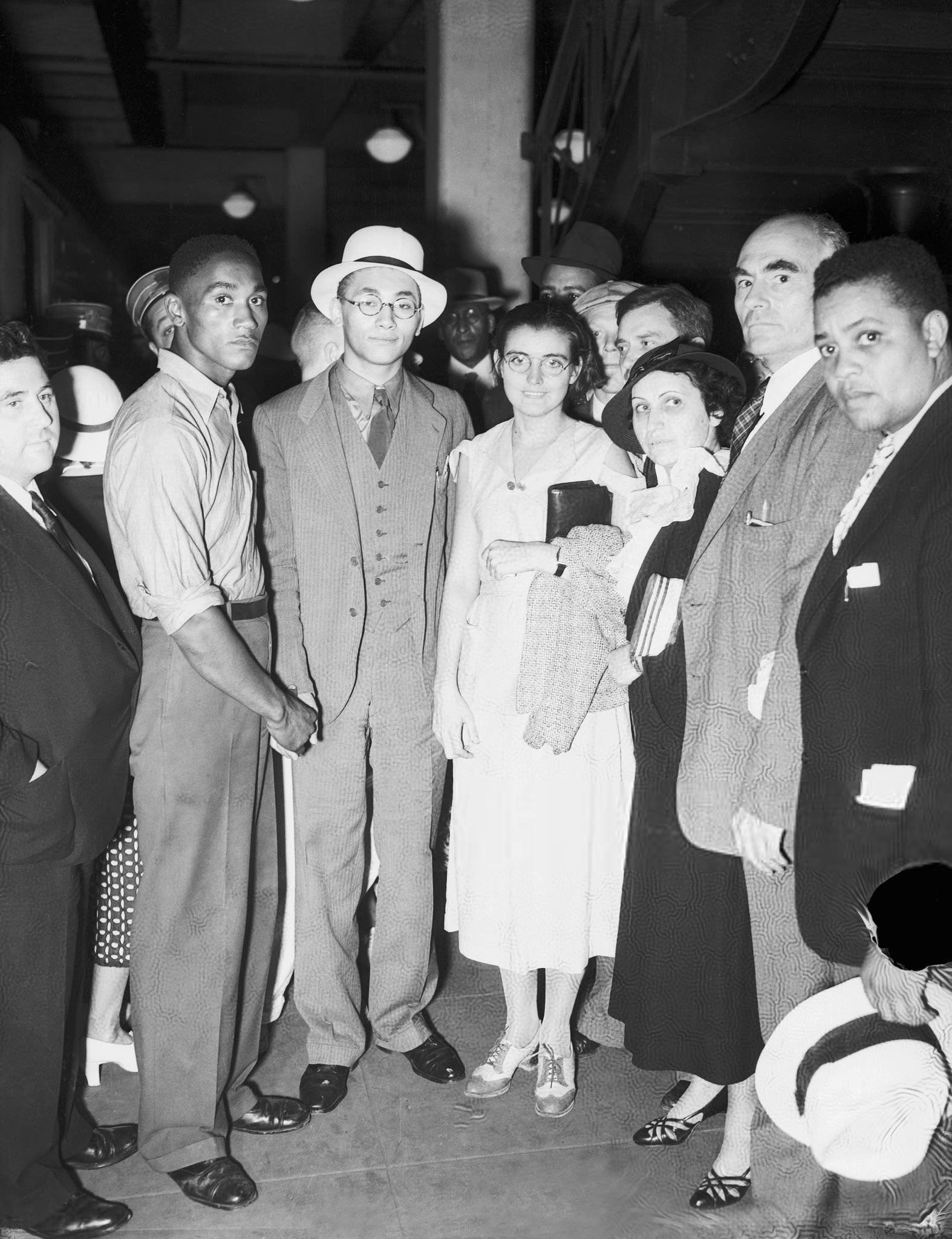
Herndon with a group of Communists and sympathizers after his release on bail from the Georgia State Prison. The group includes his brother Milton, Scottsboro Case witness Ruby Bates, and Communist leaders Robert Minor and James W. Ford.

He was held for nearly six months in jail and was released on Christmas Eve, after his bail of $7,000 was paid by the International Labor Defense, a legal organization affiliated with the Communist Party USA. An all-white jury found Herndon guilty at trial on January 18, 1933. Hired by the ILD, his young attorneys were Benjamin J. Davis Jr. and John H. Geer. The International Juridical Association provided support by reviewing their brief for Herndon. The prosecutor, John Hudson, wanted the death penalty for Herndon for possessing communist literature, however, Geer and Davis made it known that the literature could be found in the public library. Herndon was sentenced to 18 to 20 years of hard labor "on the chain gang."

On December 7, 1935, Herndon's conviction was overturned by the state appeals court and he was released on bail. After the Georgia Supreme Court upheld his original conviction, Herndon went on a national speaking tour in 1936 to promote his case while his defense appealed it to the Supreme Court. He appeared before crowds in Denver, Colorado; Topeka, Kansas; and Kansas City, Missouri. He also ran for New York State Assembly in Manhattan's 21st district, based in Harlem, as the candidate of the "All People's Party," a Communist front. He came in fourth place with roughly 1% of the vote.

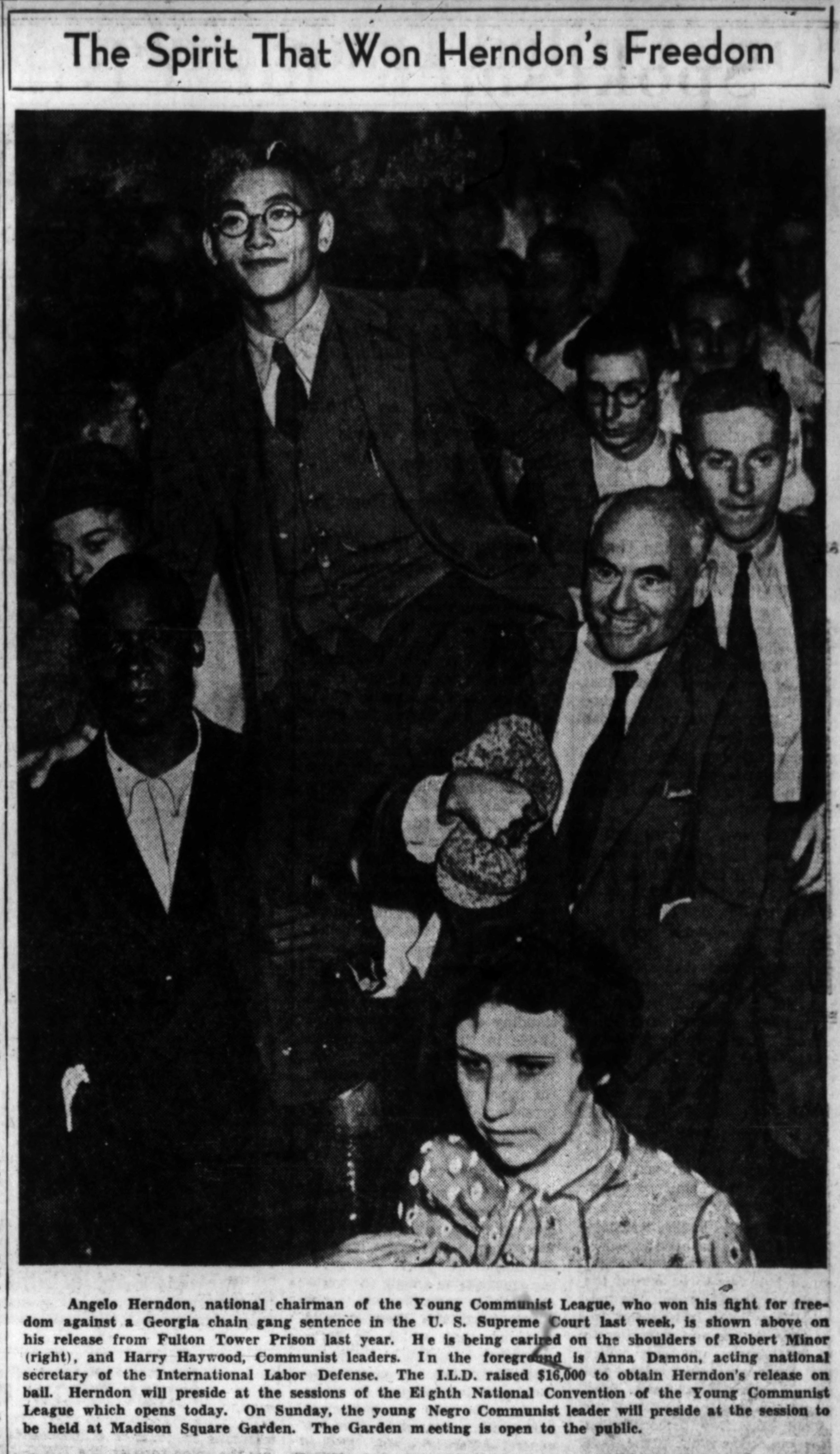
Harry Haywood and Robert Minor lift Herndon on their shoulders following the Supreme Court ruling in his favor, April 1937

On April 26, 1937, a narrow five-to-four majority of the United States Supreme Court ruled in Herndon's favor, striking down Georgia's insurrection statute as unconstitutional, as it violated the First Amendment, which protects individual's right to free speech and the right of assembly. Herndon was greeted as a hero by a crowd of 6,000 well-wishers when he returned by train to Pennsylvania Station in New York City. Several leading Communist Party officials were on hand to welcome him.

On October 13, 1937, Angelo's brother Milton Herndon was killed fighting for the Republicans in the Spanish Civil War. Like Angelo, Milton was a Communist Party member. Milton had sought to use his previous experience as a National Guard while in Spain.

In the 1940s, Herndon founded the Negro Publication Society of America, which published the radical African-American newspaper The People's Advocate in San Francisco, California, among other works.

== Later life ==
But by the end of the 1940s, Herndon left the Party. He moved to the Midwest, where he lived quietly and worked as a salesman.

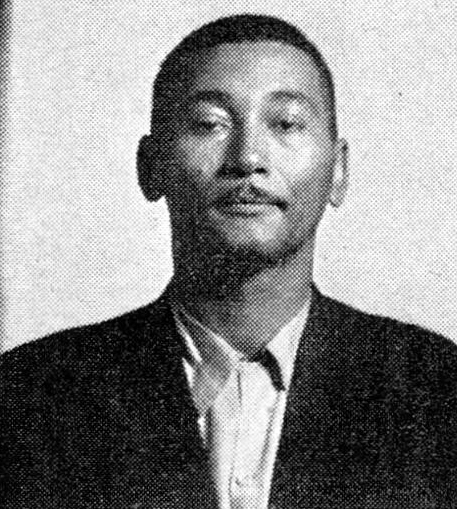
"Gene Braxton's" Chicago Police mugshot, 1954

In 1954, Jet magazine reported that Herndon, now working as a real estate broker named "Gene Braxton," had been arrested in Chicago on charges of real estate fraud. He was said to have accepted $25,000 from five separate clients for the same building. Although Braxton denied being Herndon, his sister-in-law admitted that they were the same person.

On June 8, 1969, Herndon spoke at a cultural tribute to the late Davis, whose autobiographical notes had just been published posthumously. Expressing gratitude for Davis and the ILD, Herndon compared his struggle to that faced by the activists of the 1960s, stating: "You've got to fight, black and white together. This is the greatest monument you can erect to Ben Davis. You've got to tell them what Ben Davis did."

== Writings ==
- The Case of Angelo Herndon, New York: Joint Committee To Aid the Herndon Defense, 1935.
- Let Me Live, New York: Random House, 1937.
- Let Me Live! a book review, Encyclopedia of Anti-Revisionism On-Line: Proletarian Cause, N. Sanders.
- "You cannot kill the working class", New York: International Labor Defense and the League of Struggle for Negro Rights, 1937.
- The Scottsboro Boys: Four Freed! Five to Go!, New York: Workers Library Publishers, 1937.
- The Road to Liberation for the Negro People (with others), New York: Workers Library Publishers, 1939.
- Victory: Decision of the United States Supreme Court in the Case of Angelo Herndon, April 1937: Full text of the majority decision setting aside the verdict in the Herndon case, by Justice Roberts; with the dissenting opinion of the minority, by Justice Van Devanter. With an Introduction by Anna Damon New York State: International Labor Defense.
