= Scott Pomeroy =

Scott L. Pomeroy is the Bronson Crothers Professor of Neurology and Director of the Intellectual and Developmental Disabilities Research Center of Harvard Medical School, Chairman of the Department of Neurology and Neurologist-in-Chief of Boston Children's Hospital, and an Associate Member of the Broad Institute of MIT and Harvard.

== Education ==
Pomeroy graduated from Wyoming High School in Ohio in 1971, received a B.A. in 1975 from Miami University, M.D. / Ph.D. degrees in 1982 from the University of Cincinnati College of Medicine and completed residencies in Pediatrics and Child Neurology respectively at Boston Children's Hospital and Washington University in St. Louis and St. Louis Children's Hospital.

== Research ==
His research was the first to apply genomic tools (such as DNA microarrays) to understand the neurodevelopmental origins and molecular mechanisms of childhood brain tumors, especially medulloblastomas, providing the basis for the current classification of these tumors. This, in turn, led to targeted therapies for brain tumors based upon their more fundamental biology rather than their microscopic appearance. In addition, he has contributed to understanding the neurological outcomes of survivors of nervous system infections and cancer.

He also serves as the child neurology editor of the textbook Neurology in Clinical Practice, one of the leading texts in the field, and of the nervous system volumes of the Netter Collection of Medical Illustrations.

== Awards ==
- Young Investigator Award, Child Neurology Society, 1989
- Compassionate Caregiver Award, Kenneth Schwartz Center, inaugural recipient 1999
- Sidney Carter Award, American Academy of Neurology, 2002
- Daniel Drake Medal, University of Cincinnati, 2007
- National Academy of Medicine, Elected Member 2017
- Bernard Sachs Award, Child Neurology Society, 2019

== Selected publications ==
- Pomeroy SL, Tamayo P, Gaasenbeek M, Sturla LM, Angelo M, McLaughlin ME, Kim JYH, Goumnerova LC, Black PM, Lau C, Allen JC, Zagzag D, Olson JM, Curran T, Wetmore C, Biegel JA, Poggio T, Mukherjee S, Rifkin R, Califano A, Stolovitzky G, Louis DN, Mesirov JP, Lander ES and Golub TR. Prediction of central nervous system embryonal tumour outcome based on gene expression. Nature 2002; 415:436-442.
- Cho YJ, Tsherniak A, Tamayo P, Greulich H, Lu J, Berhoukim R, Getz G, Amanil V, Goumnerova L, Eberhart CG, Lau CC, Olson JM, Gilbertson RJ, Gajjar A, Haberler C, Delattre O, Kool M, Meyerson M, Mesirov JP, Pomeroy SL. Integrative genomic analysis of medulloblastoma identifies a molecular subgroup that drives poor clinical outcome. J Clin Oncol 2011; 29:1424-1430.
- Pugh TJ, Weeraratne SD, Archer TC, Pomeranz Krummel DA, Auclair D, Bochicchio J, Carneiro MO, Carter SL, Cibulskis K, Erlich RL, Greulich H, Lawrence MS, Lennon NJ, McKenna A, Meldrim J, Ramos AH, Ross MG, Russ C, Shefler E, Sivachenko A, Sogoloff B, Stanjanov P, Tamayo P, Mesirov JP, Amani V, Teider N, Sengupta S, Pierre Francois J, Northcott PA, Taylor MD, Yu F, Crabtree GR, Kautzman AG, Gabriel SB, Getz G, Jäger N, Jones DTW, Lichter P, Pfister SM, Roberts TM, Meyerson M*, Pomeroy SL*, Cho YJ*. Medulloblastoma exome sequencing uncovers subtype-specific somatic mutations. (*corresponding authors) Nature 2012; 488:106-110.
