= John Reily =

American soldier (1763–1850)

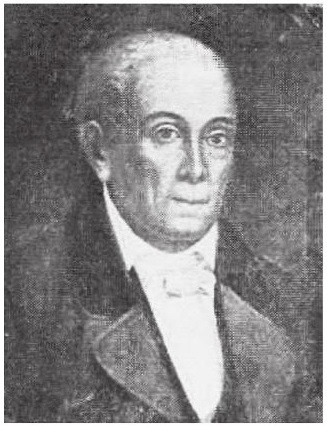

Hamilton County delegate to the 1802 Ohio Constitutional Convention
- In office November 1, 1802 – November 29, 1802 Serving with nine others

Personal details
- Born: April 10, 1763 Chester County, Pennsylvania
- Died: June 7, 1850 (aged 87) Hamilton, Ohio
- Party: Federalist
- Spouse: Nancy Hunter
- Children: five

Military service
- Allegiance: United States
- Branch/service: United States Army
- Years of service: 1780–1782
- Unit: Virginia Militia
- Battles/wars: American Revolutionary War

John Reily (1763–1850) was a soldier in the American Revolution who later held a number of civic positions including helping draft the Ohio State Constitution. Reily Township in Butler County, Ohio is named for him.

== Biography ==
John Reily was born in Chester County, Pennsylvania on April 10, 1763, and moved with his parents to Augusta County, Virginia when young.

From the age of 17, Reily served in the Revolutionary War, including the Battle of Camden, the Battle of Guilford Court House, and the Battle of Eutaw Springs.

After the War, Reily moved to Kentucky. In 1790 he moved to Columbia, (now a neighborhood of Cincinnati) to build John Reily's Classical School and became its first school teacher. It was one of the first schools in the territory. The school grew and he soon hired a second teacher, Francis Dunlavy.

In 1799, he was elected clerk of the Legislature of the Northwest Territory, and re-elected to that position in 1800 and 1801. In 1802 he was elected as one of the seven trustees of the new town of Cincinnati. Later that year he was a representative at the Constitutional Convention that drafted Ohio's first Constitution. In 1802 he was also one of the first subscribers who purchased shares to start the Cincinnati Library, one of the first libraries in the state.

He moved to Hamilton, Ohio, and was elected the first Clerk of Court for Butler County by the associate judges of the court of common pleas, a position to which he was re-elected for 37 years. He was concurrently appointed as clerk for the supreme court of Butler County, a position which he also maintained until 1842. He was also a long time Postmaster of Hamilton, and he served as County Recorder from 1803 to 1811. At first he worked from a small building outside the old fort at Hamilton, before moving the offices to his home, and in 1824 to the newly built court house.

Reily was appointed as one of the first trustees of Miami University, and was president of the board of trustees until 1824.

In 1808 he married Nancy Hunter. The Reilys had two daughters and three sons, one of whom, Robert, founded the town of Wyoming, Ohio.

Reily died in Hamilton June 7, 1850.

== Legacy ==
In 1807, a new township was formed by in Butler County by splitting the existing St. Clair Township. The new township was named Reily Township after John Reily.

In his positions as clerk, Reily used high quality materials. The materials, combined with his "bold" character strokes meant that his hand-written records from the early 1800s were still clearly legible in the early 1900s.

== Bibliography ==
- Fess, Simeon D., ed. (1937). Ohio, A four volume reference library on the History of a Great State. Vol. 4. Chicago: Lewis Publishing Company. p. 23. OCLC 418516.
- Bartlow, Bert Surene (1905). Centennial History of Butler County, Ohio. B. F. Bowen.
- Milligan, Fred J. (2003). Ohio's Founding Fathers. Lincoln, Nebraska: iUniverse. pp. 65–70. ISBN 0595750397. OCLC 53472872.
- McBride, James (1869). Pioneer biography, sketches of the lives of some of the early settlers of Butler County, Ohio. Cincinnati: Robert Clarke & Company. p. 1.
- Goss, Charles Frederic (1912). Cincinnati, the Queen City, 1788–1912. Vol. 2. Cincinnati: S J Clarke Publishing Company.
- Nelson, S B; Runk, J M (1894). History of Cincinnati and Hamilton County, Ohio. Cincinnati: S B Nelson and Company. p. 96.
