= Nathaniel McLean =

American lawyer

Nathaniel Collins McLean
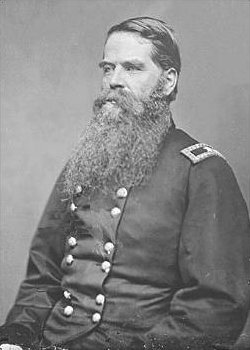
- Brig. Gen. Nathaniel McLean
- Born: February 2, 1815; Cincinnati, Ohio
- Died: January 4, 1905 (aged 89); Bellport, New York
- Burial place: Woodland Cemetery, Bellport, New York
- Relatives: John McLean (father)
- Military career
- Allegiance: United States of America; Union
- Branch: United States Army; Union Army
- Service years: 1861–1865
- Rank: Brigadier General
- Commands: 75th Ohio Infantry Regiment; 2nd Bde, 1st Div, XI Corps; 1st Div, District of Kentucky; 1st Bde, 2nd Div, XXIII Corps
- Conflicts: American Civil War: Battle of Cheat Mountain; Battle of McDowell; Battle of Cross Keys; Battle of Cedar Mountain; Second Battle of Bull Run; Battle of Chancellorsville; Battle of Pickett's Mill
- Other work: Lawyer, Farmer

Nathaniel Collins McLean (February 2, 1815 – January 4, 1905), was a lawyer, farmer, and Union general during the American Civil War. He was appointed colonel of the 75th Ohio Infantry Regiment in 1861 and led the regiment in several battles before commanding a brigade. During the Second Battle of Bull Run, his brigade's determined defense of Chinn Ridge probably saved the Union Army from a disaster. He led a brigade at the Battle of Chancellorsville in 1863, for a month in the Atlanta campaign in 1864, and in the Carolina campaign in 1865. After the war, he returned to his law practice in Cincinnati, moved to Minnesota, and moved again to New York where he died.

== Early life and career ==
Born in Warren County, Ohio, Nathaniel McLean was a son of John McLean, an 1856 and 1860 Republican presidential candidate and Associate Justice of the Supreme Court of the United States known as "the politician of the Supreme Court".

McLean was well educated, and graduated from Augusta College in Kentucky at the age of sixteen. He then attended Harvard College and received his J.D. He was married in 1838 to Caroline Thew Burnett, the daughter of a Cincinnati judge. While practicing law, he fell ill, and he was advised to travel to Europe and attempt to regain his health. Shortly after his trip, his wife died. He remarried in 1858 to Mary Louise Thompson from Louisville, Kentucky.

== Civil War service ==
At the beginning of the Civil War, McLean organized the 75th Ohio Infantry Regiment under authority from Maj. Gen. John C. Frémont and became its colonel September 18, 1861. McLean, with Lieutenant-Colonel R.A. Constable and Major Robert Reily, organized and trained the 75th in Wyoming, Ohio, (north of Cincinnati) at Camp John McLean, which he of course named after his father. The regiment was organized into a brigade commanded by Brig. Gen. Robert Milroy and assigned to duty in western Virginia under Frémont and the Mountain Department.

=== Western Virginia ===
In January 1862, McLean's troops were shipped from Cincinnati to Grafton, Virginia, where they remained until February 17, when they marched 43 miles to Huttonsville, Virginia, to join with the rest of the Mountain Department. From Huttonsville, Milroy moved his brigade out towards Staunton, Virginia, in order to distract Stonewall Jackson from attacking other Union troops in the Shenandoah Valley as part of his 1862 Valley Campaign; McLean's troops were at the head of this march. Bogged down by muddy roads, McLean and his men were forced to stop in Monterey, Virginia, so the rest of the column could catch up. Here, McLean saw his first action of the war, repulsing two hours of attacks from a small force of Confederates. Jackson soon turned his attention to Milroy's march. When the 75th Ohio was within 10 miles of Staunton, Milroy ordered the march to turn back at Buffalo Gap, so he could engage Jackson. Milroy made his headquarters at McDowell, Virginia, and Jackson positioned his men east of the town on top of a hill known as Bull Pasture Mountain. Trying to catch the Confederates by surprise, the Union attacked late on May 8, 1862, in the Battle of McDowell, with McLean leading several regiments up the hill on their right flank. McLean was able to push the Georgians at the top of the hill to their second line of defense, but that was all. After the fighting, Generals Milroy and Schenck both praised McLean's attack as being "gallant." The following day, Milroy withdrew his troops west. At the Battle of Cross Keys, McLean was promoted to the command of a brigade, consisting of four Ohio regiments, though he was held in reserve along the Keezletown Road on "Frémont's Final Line."

=== Second Bull Run ===
On June 26, 1862, President Lincoln combined the forces under Frémont, Maj. Gen. Nathaniel P. Banks, and Brig. Gen. Irvin McDowell into the Army of Virginia commanded by Maj. Gen. John Pope. McLean was given control the "Ohio Brigade" in the I Corps of this army, which included his 75th Ohio.

At the Second Battle of Bull Run, McLean's brigade was placed at the extreme left of the Union line on Chinn Ridge. McDowell and Pope had placed him there to slow down a Confederate flank attack, which could have potentially overrun the rest of the Army of Virginia. McLean's troops took many casualties, but they were able to hold off the Confederates for a half-hour, which allowed Pope to establish a second line of defense further north of Chinn Ridge. This line of defense allowed the Army of Virginia to withdraw from the field without being destroyed.

For his actions here, McLean would be rewarded with a brigadier generalship on September 29, 1862.

=== Chancellorsville ===
After Second Bull Run, McLean and his regiments were posted in defense of Washington. Here, the Army of Virginia was discontinued (Pope would be sent to Minnesota for his failures), and the I Corps became Maj. Gen. Franz Sigel's XI Corps of the Army of the Potomac under Maj. Gen. George B. McClellan. As part of the XI Corps, the brigade stayed posted in Washington during the Battle of Antietam in September, and they were not called on to move again until December. At this point, McClellan had been replaced by Maj. Gen. Ambrose Burnside, who called the XI Corps to Fredericksburg, but kept them in reserve during the Battle of Fredericksburg in mid-December. Afterwards, McLean was put in charge of protecting a small town on the Northern Neck.

By the next May, there had been some rearrangements in the Army of the Potomac, which was now under the control of Maj. Gen. Joseph Hooker. Hooker placed in command of the XI Corps Maj. Gen. Oliver O. Howard, because the latter had been angry he was passed over for command of the III Corps. Since March 10, McLean had grown popular with the men as commander of the First Division of the XI Corps, but Howard opted to replace him with Brig. Gen. Charles Devens, a New England man very much like Howard; McLean was relegated to brigade commander. As such, he found himself on the right flank of the Union battle line for the Battle of Chancellorsville. This would be the part of the line that Stonewall Jackson attacked with his famous Flank March.

McLean was at corps headquarters with Devens when the attack happened (Howard had left the area, inexplicably escorting reinforcements to another part of the battlefield). As Confederates were approaching the Ohio Brigade's position, McLean implored Devens for orders to turn their front. Devens refused, possibly because he had been using brandy to dull the pain of a leg injury that occurred the previous day, when his horse ran him into a tree. As a result, the Ohio Brigade managed an impromptu defense, and even attempted a counterattack, before being driven back towards Chancellorsville. Devens was shot in the foot during the retreat, giving McLean command of the division again. They reformed on Mineral Springs Road, northeast of Chancellorsville and away from any fighting, with the rest of the XI Corps.

Howard accepted no personal blame for the fiasco at Chancellorsville, and in his autobiography suggests that he thought it was entirely his corps's fault for running, not his. McLean, coincidentally, would be ordered west May 18. He was given a desk job, provost marshal general. under Burnside in the Department of the Ohio. McLean was relocated back to his home of Cincinnati. As provost marshal, he dealt with prisoners-of-war and "citizen-prisoners" who applied to take oaths of allegiance to the United States.

=== Western Theater ===
McLean did not hold another field command for a year, although he was transferred to command of the first division of the District of Kentucky under Major General Stephen Gano Burbridge, consisting of four brigades.

McLean commanded a brigade in the XXIII Corps during the Atlanta campaign and again came into conflict with Howard for alleged failures at the Battle of Pickett's Mill. This time, while assaulting Confederate positions on May 27, 1864, McLean's brigade was to be used as a distraction. But, they separated from the brigade on his left, whom they were supposed to stay linked with, and were not able to provide a distraction. Ultimately, Howard's corps took many casualties. He would later write, "General McLean…disregarded the request and moved off at once…leaving [General Thomas Wood's and General Richard Johnson's] divisions isolated. He (McLean) alleged in excuse that his men were entirely without rations.".

McLean was again relegated to a staff position and later transferred to North Carolina, where he served again in the XXIII Corps during Sherman's Carolina Campaign. The corps took Fort Fisher, and intended to meet the rest of Sherman's army in central North Carolina, but they got as far as Goldsboro before the Battle of Bentonville in March. Seeing the end of the war coming, McLean resigned his commission April 20, 1865, six days before the surrender of General Joseph Johnston at Bennett Place in Durham, North Carolina. Throughout the war, McLean was off duty for the space of thirty days, having had leave of absence once for twenty, and one more again for ten days.

== Postbellum career ==
After the war, McLean returned to Cincinnati and his life as a lawyer. Within a few years, he relocated to Minnesota, where he retired to the quiet occupation of a farmer and built a church. In 1885, he moved, this time to Bellport, New York, where within a year he set up another Episcopal congregation. He would die in Bellport in 1905.

== See also ==
- List of American Civil War generals (Union)
