= Milton Herndon =

American Spanish Civil War volunteer

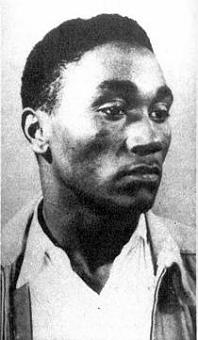
- Born: March 9, 1908; Wyoming, Ohio, U.S.
- Died: October 13, 1937 (aged 29); Fuentes de Ebro, Spain
- Cause of death: Killed in action
- Military career
- Allegiance: United States; Spanish Republic
- Branch: National Guard; International Brigades
- Service years: 1937
- Rank: Section leader
- Unit: The "Abraham Lincoln" XV International Brigade
- Conflicts: Spanish Civil War; Battle of Fuentes de Ebro †
- Political party: Communist
- Parents: Paul Herndon (father); Hattie Herndon (mother)
- Relatives: Angelo Herndon (brother); Hilliard Frank Braxton (brother); Leroy M. Braxon (brother); Bishop Leo Braxton (brother); M. Lola Braxton (sister); Lizzie Liffridge (sister); Nathaniel Braxton (brother)

Milton Herndon (March 9, 1908 – October 13, 1937) was an African-American U.S. national guardsman, steelworker, labor organizer and volunteer in the Spanish Civil War where he was section leader of the Mackenzie–Papineau Battalion in the Abraham Lincoln brigade. He was killed in action along with his entire machine gun company while supporting their advance into Fuentes de Ebro, a small town southeast of Zaragoza.

== Early life and career ==
Milton Herndon was born into a working-class family in a majority white village north of Cincinnati called Wyoming, Ohio, where they were subjected to racial discrimination. His father Paul Herndon was a coal miner who died of black lung disease when Milton was a child, and his mother Hattie Herndon was a housemaid for white families. Milton and his siblings attended public schools, and after completing just two years of high school, he began a career as a steelworker to help provide for his family, and served one and a half years in the U.S. National Guard. After joining the Communist Party in 1934, he decided to move to Chicago, Illinois and become a labor organizer. In 1936 he joined the Young Communist League.

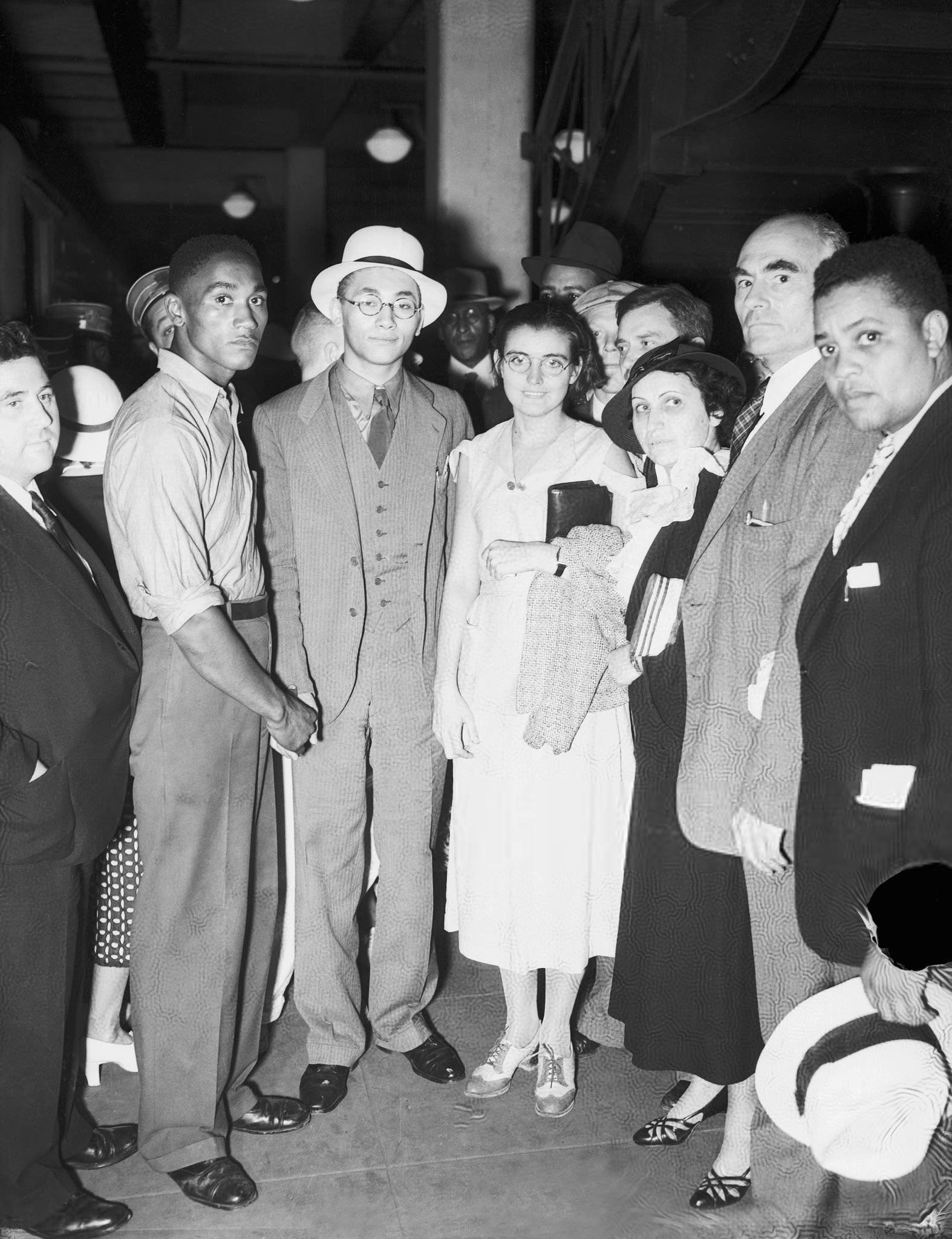
Milton and his brother Angelo after the latter's release on bail from the Georgia State Prison, weeks before Milton left for Spain.

== Spanish Civil War ==
On May 8, 1937, Herndon departed for Spain aboard the American Importer to join the International Brigades, going by the alias "Milton Braxton". Herndon joined the Mackenzie–Papineau Battalion machine gun company, which was a newly formed battalion at the time to accommodate an influx of Canadian volunteers. Due to his former military experience, Herndon became section leader.

In October 1937 the Mackenzie–Papineau Battalion set out on their first mission in the Aragon Front to capture a small town southeast of Zaragoza called Fuentes de Ebro, hoping this would lead them to capture Zaragoza next. On October 13, Herndon received an order to position a machine gun to support his Battalion's advance into the town. While executing this command, Herndon and his entire team were killed by a hail of long-range machine gun fire. The battalion as a whole suffered heavy losses during the attack and were unsuccessful in taking the town.
