= 75th Ohio Infantry Regiment =

- Active: 1861–1865
- Country: United States of America
- Allegiance: Union
- Branch: Union Army
- Type: Infantry
- Size: 984 at outset of service
- Engagements: McDowell; Cross Keys; Second Bull Run; South Mountain; Chancellorsville; Gettysburg; Battery Wagner; Gainesville

The 75th Ohio Infantry Regiment, sometimes 75th Ohio Volunteer Infantry was an infantry regiment from southwestern Ohio in the Union Army during the American Civil War. It served in the Eastern Theater, most notably in the battles of Chancellorsville and Gettysburg and then in the siege operations against Charleston, South Carolina.

== Service history ==
=== 1862 ===
The infantry regiment was organized at Camp John McLean near Cincinnati, Ohio, from November 7, 1861, to January 8, 1862, to serve three years. The 75th Ohio was initially led by Col. Nathaniel C. McLean, Lt. Col. Robert A. Constable and Maj. Robert Reily. The regiment began its service with 984 officers and men. Among the enlistees was future U.S. Congressman Henry Lee Morey.

The 75th was initially sent to augment the Union forces in the Shenandoah Valley region of Virginia. It soon participated in defending what became known as Stonewall Jackson's Valley Campaign. On May 8, 1862, at the Battle of McDowell, the regiment lost 87 men. It fought again at Cross Keys before being sent eastward to reinforce the Union troops after the Peninsula Campaign.

The 75th OVI then participated in the subsequent Northern Virginia Campaign and fought in the Second Battle of Bull Run, where it lost 113 men. Within a month, it saw action at the Battle of South Mountain in Central Maryland.

=== 1863 - Chancellorsville ===
During the Battle of Chancellorsville in May, the 75th Ohio was part of the 2nd Brigade, 1st Division of the XI Corps in the Army of the Potomac. During the battle, the XI Corps was far from the Confederate army, so their commander, Maj. Gen. Oliver O. Howard did not have them dig defenses in case of an attack despite being ordered to do so by Maj. Gen. Joseph Hooker.

On May 2, Confederate General Robert E. Lee decided on a daring and very risky plan. Knowing the XI Corps was not prepared for an attack, he sent General Thomas "Stonewall" Jackson and his Second Corps of 28,000 men on a 12-mile march around the Union right flank with the hope of catching the XI Corps by surprise.

At 4:30 in the afternoon, the 75th's commander, Col. Robert Reily, had heard reports of a Confederate movement in his direction. Unlike many other commanders, including General Howard, Reily did not dismiss them. He prepared the 75th Ohio for an attack he knew was coming. He had his men lie down and rest by their guns and wait for the attack. Within a half-hour, Jackson's Corps rushed out of the thick underbrush. When Jackson's corps struck at about 5 p.m., the XI Corps was completely unprepared, many of the men engaged in eating supper. Most of the XI Corps was taken by surprise and broke for the rear without firing a shot. As other men of the XI Corps ran by in a panic, the 75th Ohio stood and fired back at the Confederates. They kept up the fire for ten minutes until the Confederates had overwhelmed their lines forcing them to retreat. In those ten minutes, Colonel Reily was killed, while 150 other men of the 75th Ohio were killed or wounded.

=== 1863 - Gettysburg ===
At the Battle of Gettysburg on July 1–3, 1863, the 75th Ohio, now under the command of Colonel Andrew L. Harris (future 44th Governor of Ohio), arrived with the rest of the XI Corps on the battlefield mid-day on July 1, 1863, the first day of the battle. The fighting had been going on since morning. As part of Brig. Gen. Francis C. Barlow's division, the 75th Ohio took a defensive position on Blocher's Knoll (now known as Barlow's Knoll), north of the town. Unfortunately, this slight rise in the terrain was too far forward in comparison to the other XI Corps divisions, and Barlow's position formed a salient that could be attacked from multiple sides. Confederate Lt. Gen. Richard S. Ewell sent two brigades, those of Brig. Gen. George P. Doles and Brig. Gen. John B. Gordon, in a frontal assault on the knoll. Barlow's division was overwhelmed, suffering serious losses, and Barlow was wounded and left on the field for dead. Harris led his men in a successful withdrawal through the hotly contested streets to Cemetery Hill, where they entrenched on the northeastern slope. Harris took command of the 2nd Brigade after its commander, Brig. Gen. Adelbert Ames, took Barlow's place as commander of the 1st Division. George Benson Fox later took command of the 75th as Colonel Harris and other superior officers were wounded or killed in battle; and specifically in consequence of Commander J.C. Mulharen having been killed.

At around 7:30 at night on July 2, the 75th Ohio, positioned between the 25th Ohio Infantry and the 17th Connecticut Infantry regiments, now on a brickyard lane at the base of East Cemetery Hill, held off attacks by regiments of Brig. Gen. Harry T. Hays' "Louisiana Tigers" brigade. Overall, the Buckeyes lost 186 officers and men (16 killed, 74 wounded and 96 missing) at Gettysburg.

=== Actions later in the war ===
In August, the 75th OVI was transferred to Charleston Harbor, remaining in the trenches in South Carolina until September. The 75th then moved to Folly Island, and then to Florida, where the men were mounted and designated as mounted infantry. The regiment served in Florida until the close of the war, participating in the Battle of Gainesville on August 17. Six companies were mustered out in October and November 1864, while the veterans remained in the service until August 1865.

== Commanders ==
- Colonel Nathaniel C. McLean - promoted to Brigadier General, December 3, 1862
- Colonel Robert Reily - killed May 2, 1863, at Battle of Chancellorsville
- Colonel Andrew L. Harris - mustered out with regiment on January 17, 1865; Brevet Brigadier General, March 13, 1865
- Colonel Charles W. Friend
- Major George Benson Fox - took command of the 75th Ohio at Battle of Gettysburg after all superior officers were wounded or killed.
- Captain James C. Mulharen - killed at Battle of Gettysburg July 2, 1863

== Monuments ==
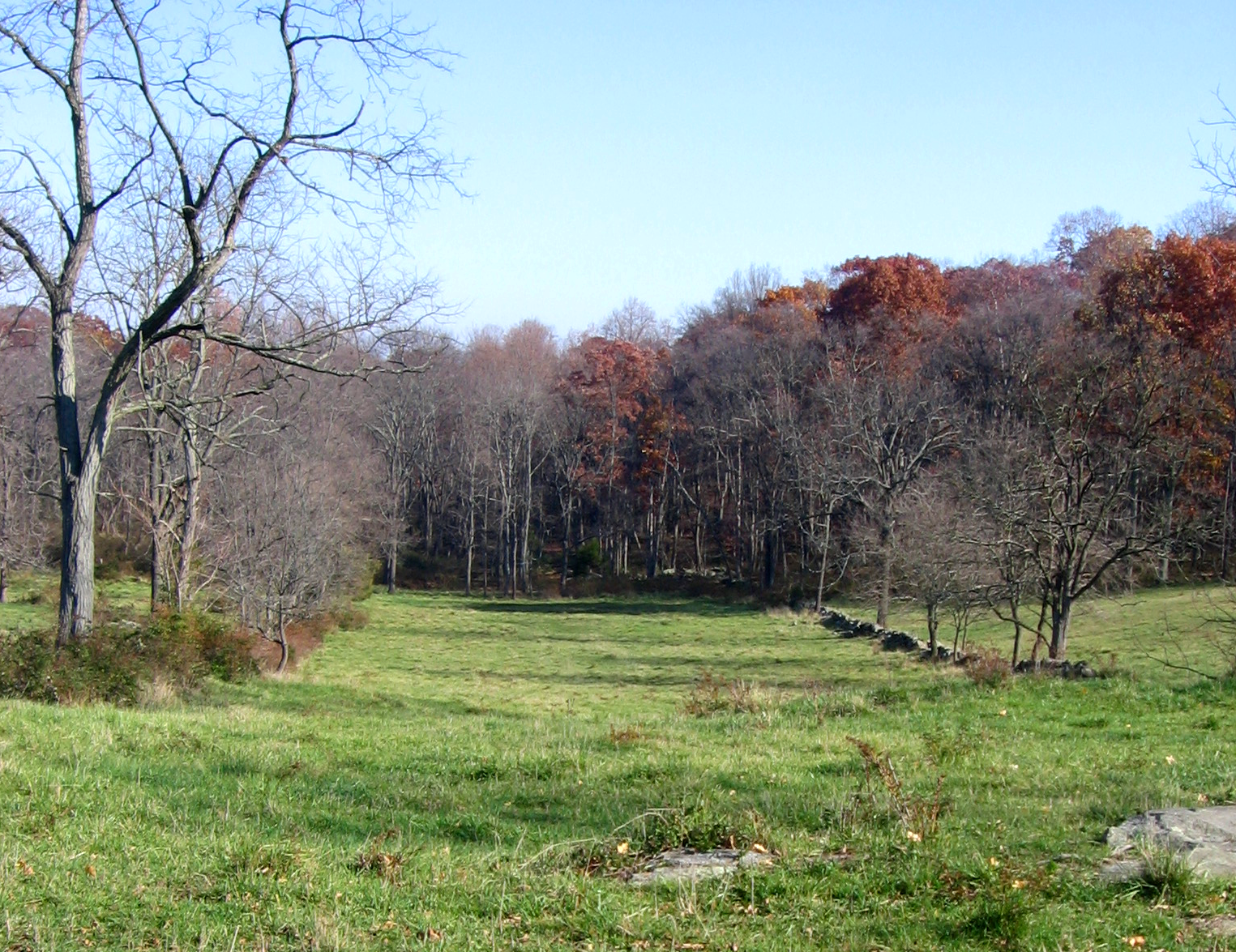
Wainwright Avenue.

There are two combined monuments to the 25th and the 75th Ohio Regiments in the Gettysburg National Military Park. One is north of Gettysburg on East Howard Avenue on Barlow's Knoll (their position on the First Day). The second is on Wainwright Avenue (approximating the former brickyard lane) on East Cemetery Hill (their position on the Second Day).

A monument to the 75th Ohio Volunteer Regiment exists at Camp John McLean Memorial Park in Wyoming, OH, dedicated in 2001. The site memorializes the training camp grounds for the regiment between October 1861 and January 1862, organized by Nathaniel McLean and Robert Reily.
