= Nadine Roberts Waters =

American singer (1892 - 1985)

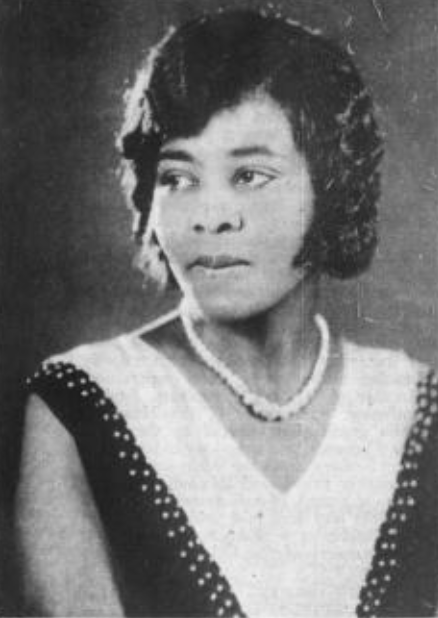
- Waters, from a 1930 publication
- Born: February 16, 1892; Wyoming, Ohio, U.S.
- Died: September 8, 1985 (aged 93); Cincinnati, Ohio, U.S.
- Other names: Nadyne Waters
- Occupation: Singer

Nadine Ella Roberts Waters (February 16, 1892 – September 8, 1985), sometimes billed as Nadyne Waters, was an American soprano concert singer, trained in Boston and Paris. She had an active career in the 1930s and 1940s, including appearances in Paris, London, and New York City.

== Early life and education ==
Roberts was born in the Wyoming suburb of Cincinnati, Ohio, the daughter of Martin Van Buren "Van" Roberts and Ella Taylor Roberts. She trained with Nathaniel Clark Smith, and attended the New England Conservatory of Music. She studied piano with Clarence B. Shirley in Cincinnati, voice with Vincent Hubbard in Boston, and with Nadia Boulanger and Gabriel Grovlez in Paris.

== Career ==
Waters was a soloist at Boston's Symphony Hall in 1928. She won a competition held in Boston by the National Federation of Music Clubs in 1929, but was considered ineligible for the top prize because she was "a race singer". She made her Paris debut in 1930, with good reviews for her French diction and vocal register. In 1931 she sang at the American Library in Paris, with composer Albert Roussel accompanying performances of his own songs. She gave a concerts at Grotrian Hall and Wigmore Hall in London in 1930, and in New York in 1936, 1938, 1939, and at the Town Hall in 1944. She also gave a radio concerts in France and the United States. "Miss Waters' voice is of a naturally good quality, fluent and pleasing in texture," commented Musical America in 1936. "Her interpretive abilities, though at present small, hold considerable promise."

In the 1940s, Waters sang in Cincinnati, and with the National Negro Opera Company. She gave a recital in Cincinnati in 1971.

== Personal life ==
Waters married printer Frank C. Waters in 1915; they had a daughter, Inez, who died in childhood in 1924, and they divorced in 1938. She died in 1973, at age 93. The Wyoming Historical Society in Ohio holds her scrapbook of letters, clippings, programs and photographs from her career. It was digitized by the Cincinnati and Hamilton County Public Library.
