= Wyoming High School (Ohio) =

Public high school in Ohio, United States

Location
- 106 Pendery Avenue; Wyoming, Hamilton County, Ohio 45215; United States; 39°13′59″N 84°28′14″W

Information
- Type: Public, Coeducational high school
- Motto: Where Excellence Becomes a Way of Life.
- Established: 1884
- School district: Wyoming City Schools
- Superintendent: Tim Weber
- Principal: Michael Voynovich
- Teaching staff: 38.90 (FTE)
- Grades: 9-12
- Enrollment: 587 (2023-2024)
- Student to teacher ratio: 15.09
- Campus: Suburb
- Campus type: Public
- Colors: Royal Blue and White
- Slogan: PRIDE
- Athletics conference: Cincinnati Hills League
- Team name: Cowboys
- Rival: Indian Hill Braves
- Accreditation: North Central Association of Colleges and Schools
- Newspaper: The Horizon
- Website: whs.wyomingcityschools.org

Wyoming High School (WHS) is a public high school located in Wyoming, Ohio, United States, a suburb of Cincinnati. The school is operated by the Wyoming City School District, in Hamilton County. The district serves students from the city of Wyoming and parts of surrounding Springfield Township.

== Academics ==
Wyoming High School offers a range of Advanced Placement (AP) courses. Wyoming also offers various music opportunities, including two string orchestras, a band, and multiple choir programs. There are also many other courses offered in the visual arts, such as Computer Graphics and Photography, as well as three separate AP art classes. Foreign languages offered are Spanish, French, and Latin, each with levels I through V (AP).

== Extracurriculars ==
Also of note is Wyoming's outstanding drama program, which is based in the Pendery Center Auditorium, a state-of-the-art facility that was completed in the year 2000. Two full-length plays and one musical are presented each year. Recent productions include Miracle Worker (2017), Games Afoot (2017), Sound of Music (2017), and Merry Wives of Winsor (2016).

Often placing at competitions of each, Wyoming's Latin Club functions as a local chapter of both the Ohio Junior Classical League (OJCL) and National Junior Classical League (NJCL).

As of May 2025, the list of extra-curricular activities was as follows:

=== WYOMUN ===
First established in 2014, WYOMUN is a Model United Nations conference run by the Wyoming High School Model United Nations Club. The conference annually hosts over 250 high school and middle school students from around the Greater Cincinnati Area. Its twelfth iteration happened on October 25, 2025.

WYOMUN has featured a host of committees including the World Health Organization, the United Nations High Commissioner for Refugees, and the League of Nations. WYOMUN has also featured non-UN crisis committees on a variety of topics such as the Vietnam War, the Chicano Movement, the Kingdom of Kamehameha, the Arab Spring and the Seven Years' War, and has occasionally ventured into pop culture with a committee on Stranger Things from Netflix, as well as one on the Harry Potter series.

Each year, WYOMUN invites keynote speakers to address its delegates during opening ceremonies. Notable recent speakers have been Ohio Senator Sherrod Brown, President of the Puerto Rican Senate and current gubernatorial candidate Eduardo Bhatia, and Indiana University Maurer School of Law Vice President of International Affairs Hannah L. Buxbaum. The keynote speaker for WYOMUN VII was the distinguished former ambassador Thomas Boyatt. Notable alumni include.

== Athletics ==
Wyoming offers 24 varsity sports, which include:

=== Varsity sports ===
- Fall
  - Football
  - Men's Soccer
  - Women's Soccer
  - Volleyball
  - Men's Golf
  - Women's Golf
  - Women's Tennis
  - Cross Country (co-ed)
  - Cheerleading (Football)
- Winter
  - Men's Basketball
  - Women's Basketball
  - Swimming (co-ed)
  - Diving (co-ed)
  - Wrestling
  - Indoor Track (Club) (co-ed)
  - Bowling (co-ed)
  - Cheerleading (Basketball)
- Spring
  - Track and Field (co-ed)
  - Men's Tennis
  - Men's Lacrosse
  - Women's Lacrosse
  - Baseball
  - Softball
  - Men's Volleyball

=== State championships ===
- Boys football – 1977, 2018
- Boys track and field – 1950
- Girls basketball – 1996
- Boys soccer - 2021, 2026
- Boys Basketball - 2026

== Controversy ==
In 2023 three high school boys were arrested and charged for the rape of another student. The incident took place after a baseball practice with the assailants and victim being members of the Junior Varsity baseball team. The victim was also said to have autism and ADHD. One of the students was charged with one count of rape, three counts of kidnapping, and one count of hazing. Another one of the students was charged with one count of gross sexual imposition, three counts of kidnapping, and one count of hazing. The third student was charged with one count of gross sexual imposition, two counts of kidnapping, and one count of hazing.

One of the students plead guilty to a misdemeanor hazing charge and a felony abduction charge and was sentenced to probation until he turned 21. The other two students took plea deals and were sentenced to a similar probation as the other student. The Wyoming High School superintendent ensured that the incident did not reflect the values of Wyoming High School but concerns were brought up about the culture in Wyoming athletics and baseball that allowed such an incident to happen. As a result, the Junior Varsity baseball coach was fired and the athletics director was fired just months later.

== Notable alumni ==
- William G. Bowen, former president, Princeton University and the Andrew W. Mellon Foundation
- Thomas D. Boyatt, former U.S. Ambassador to Burkina Faso (1978–1980) and Colombia (1980–1983)
- Robert Brewster, American football player
- Deena Deardurff, American swimmer, 1972 Olympic Gold medalist in 4 × 100 m medley.
- John R. Fox, 1st Lieutenant, United States Army, Posthumous awarded the Congressional Medal of Honor for bravery in Italy during the Second World War.
- Bob Goodridge, American football player
- William Greider, writer
- B. Todd Jones, chief disciplinary officer of the National Football League, former Director of Bureau of Alcohol, Tobacco, Firearms and Explosives former U.S. Attorney (Minnesota); partner at Robins, Kaplan, Miller & Ciresi
- Ruston Kelly, singer-songwriter
- C.F. Payne, illustrator
- David Payne, USA Track Team member (2008) Olympic Silver Medalist
- John Weld Peck II, judge
- Ahmed Plummer, American football player
- P. J. Pope, American football player
- Jeff Russell, baseball player
- David Shenk, writer
- Sean Smith, American football player
- Tracy Smith, TV personality
- John Terlesky, actor and director
- Otto Warmbier (Class of 2013, Salutatorian), American college student who was imprisoned in North Korea in 2016 on a charge of subversion
- Lance Williams, reporter, writer (co-author Game of Shadows)
- Michael Wolfe, poet, author, and award-winning filmmaker Muhammad: Legacy of a Prophet
- Scott Pomeroy, neurologist and professor
