= Wyoming Pastry Shop =

Bakery in Wyoming, Ohio, United States

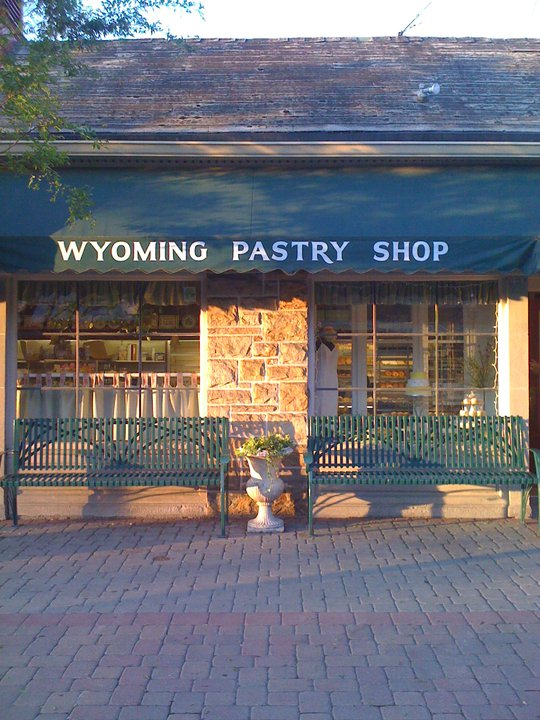
- Company type: Bakery
- Industry: Retail
- Founder: Erich Reschke
- Headquarters: 505 Wyoming Ave Cincinnati, Ohio 45215
- Number of locations: 1 location
- Area served: Greater Cincinnati area
- Key people: Phil & Kim Reschke (Owners)
- Products: Pastries, Cakes, Breads, Doughnuts, Cookies and more.
- Website: WyomingPastryShop.com

Wyoming Pastry Shop is a local bakery located in Wyoming, Ohio. The bakery primarily produces doughnuts, cookies, coffee cakes, wedding cakes, and European pastries and breads.

Erich Reschke opened Wyoming Pastry Shop in May 1980. Erich was originally from Germany but moved to the United States in 1967. Erich's son, Phil Reschke, has worked at the bakery since high school. Phil met his wife Kimberly Reschke when she applied for a cake decorating job at the bakery. Phil is currently a Certified Master Baker (CMB) from Retail Bakers of America.

Wyoming Pastry Shop has won multiple awards for being voted the best bakery in Cincinnati by Cincy Magazine. The bakery was also featured multiple times in the Cincinnati Enquirer for their expertise in German-style baking. Cincinnati Magazine wrote an article in 2006 about Wyoming, Ohio, and featured Wyoming Pastry Shop. The article discussed the history of the bakery while under the ownership of the Reschke family and the products that are baked at Wyoming Pastry Shop. Wyoming Pastry Shop is a member of the Greater Cincinnati Retail Bakers Association and the Retail Bakers of America

In 1980, Erich Reschke filed a trademark for "Cincinnati's Original Bacher Rye Bread." Bacher Rye is a specific type of rye bread.
