= Village Historic District =

Historic district in Ohio, United States

- U.S. National Register of Historic Places
- U.S. Historic district
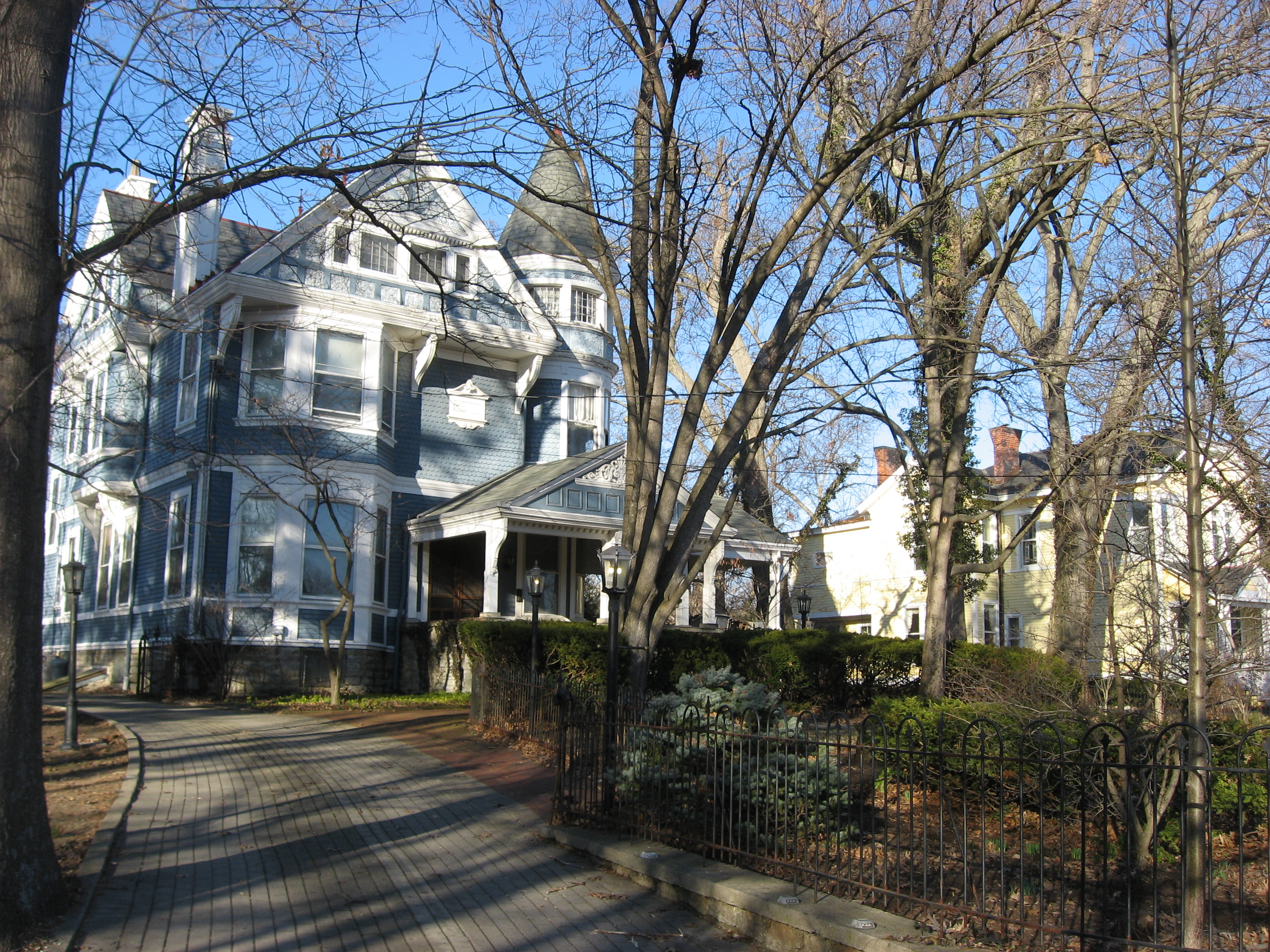
- Typical houses in the district

- Location within Ohio Location within the United States
- Location: Wyoming, Ohio
- Coordinates: 39°13′27″N 84°28′11″W
- Area: 1,780 acres (7.2 km^{2})
- Architect: Samuel Hannaford & Sons
- Architectural style: Late Victorian, Late 19th and 20th Century Revivals and Craftsman
- MPS: Wyoming MRA
- NRHP reference No.: 86001626
- Added to NRHP: August 25, 1986

Village Historic District is a registered historic district in Wyoming, Ohio, listed in the National Register of Historic Places on August 25, 1986. It contains 277 contributing buildings.

Dominant 19th Century architectural styles in the Village Historic District: Italianate (1860s and 1870s), Eastlake (1880s), Queen Anne (1885–1900), Shingle (1890s).

Dominant 20th Century architectural styles in the Village Historic District: American Four Square (1900–1910), Bungaloid (1910–1930), Colonial Revival (1905–1930), Tudor Revival (1910–1940).

== Historic uses ==
- Single Dwelling
