= Miami–Erie Canal Site Historic District =

Historic district in Ohio, United States

- U.S. National Register of Historic Places
- U.S. Historic district
- Location within Ohio Location within the United States
- Location: 5171-5251 Rialto Rd., West Chester, Ohio
- Coordinates: 39°19′29″N 84°27′07″W
- Area: 120 acres (0.49 km^{2})
- NRHP reference No.: 78002016
- Added to NRHP: 1978-12-18

Miami–Erie Canal Site Historic District is a registered historic district located along the Miami and Erie Canal near West Chester, Ohio. The district includes Lock #38 on the canal, the house once used by the lock's gatekeeper, and several foundation sites from demolished canal-related buildings. The limestone lock was built in 1825-26 as part of the canal’s original construction, which connected the Ohio River to Lake Erie. The gatekeeper's house, the second built at the lock, was completed in 1870; the first house's foundation is still present as well. A mill race links the lock to the former Friend and Fox Paper Company, which established a paper mill along the canal in 1866. Although the mill was destroyed by fire in 1932, its foundations and retaining walls are still preserved as part of the historic site.

The district was added to the National Register of Historic Places on December 18, 1978.
