= Wyoming City Schools =

School district in Ohio, United States

Address
- 420 Springfield Pike Wyoming, Ohio, 45215; United States

District information
- Type: Public
- Grades: KG–12
- Schools: 5
- NCES District ID: 3904514

Students and staff
- Students: 1,882 (2025–2026)
- Teachers: 125.55 (on an FTE basis) (2025–2026)
- Staff: 310.24 (on an FTE basis) (2025–2026)
- Student–teacher ratio: 14.99 (2025–2026)

Other information
- Website: www.wyomingcityschools.org

Wyoming City Schools is a school district that serves the city of Wyoming, Ohio along with parts of Springfield Township, in the Cincinnati metropolitan area. The district serves students in grades Kindergarten through twelfth grades on 5 separate campuses, all located in the city limits of Wyoming.

== Schools ==
=== High School ===
- Wyoming High School

=== Middle School ===
- Wyoming Middle School

=== Primary Schools ===
- Elm Elementary School
- Hilltop Elementary School
- Vermont Elementary School
