= Battle of McDowell order of battle: Confederate =

The following Confederate States Army units and commanders fought in the Battle of McDowell of the American Civil War. The Union order of battle is listed separately.

== Abbreviations used ==
=== Military rank ===
- Gen = General
- LTG = Lieutenant General
- MG = Major General
- BG = Brigadier General
- Col = Colonel
- Ltc = Lieutenant Colonel
- Maj = Major
- Cpt = Captain
- Lt = Lieutenant
- Sgt = Sergeant

=== Other ===
- w = wounded
- mW = mortally wounded
- k = killed

== Jackson's Command ==
MG Thomas J. Jackson

=== Valley District ===
MG Thomas J. Jackson

Division	Brigade	Regiments and Others
Jackson's Division; MG Thomas J. Jackson	Second Brigade Col John Campbell	21st Virginia Infantry - Ltc John M. Patton, Jr.; 42nd Virginia Infantry - Ltc William Martin; 48th Virginia Infantry - Maj John Baxter Moseley; 1st Virginia (Irish) Battalion - Cpt B.W. Leigh
Jackson's Division; MG Thomas J. Jackson	Third Brigade BG William B. Taliaferro	10th Virginia Infantry - Col Simeon B. Gibbons (k); 23rd Virginia Infantry - Col Alexander Taliaferro; 37th Virginia Infantry - Col Samuel V. Fulkerson

=== Army of the Northwest ===
BG Edward "Allegheny" Johnson (w)

Brigades	Regiments and Others
Conner's Brigade Col. Zephaniah T. Conner	12th Georgia Infantry - Maj Willis A. Hawkins; 25th Virginia Infantry - Col George H. Smith (w); 31st Virginia Infantry - Ltc William L. Jackson
Scott's Brigade Col. William C. Scott	44th Virginia Infantry - Maj Norvell Cobb; 52nd Virginia Infantry - Col Michael G. Harman (w); 58th Virginia Infantry - Col Samuel H. Letcher
