= Riddle–Friend House =

Historic house in Ohio, United States

- U.S. National Register of Historic Places
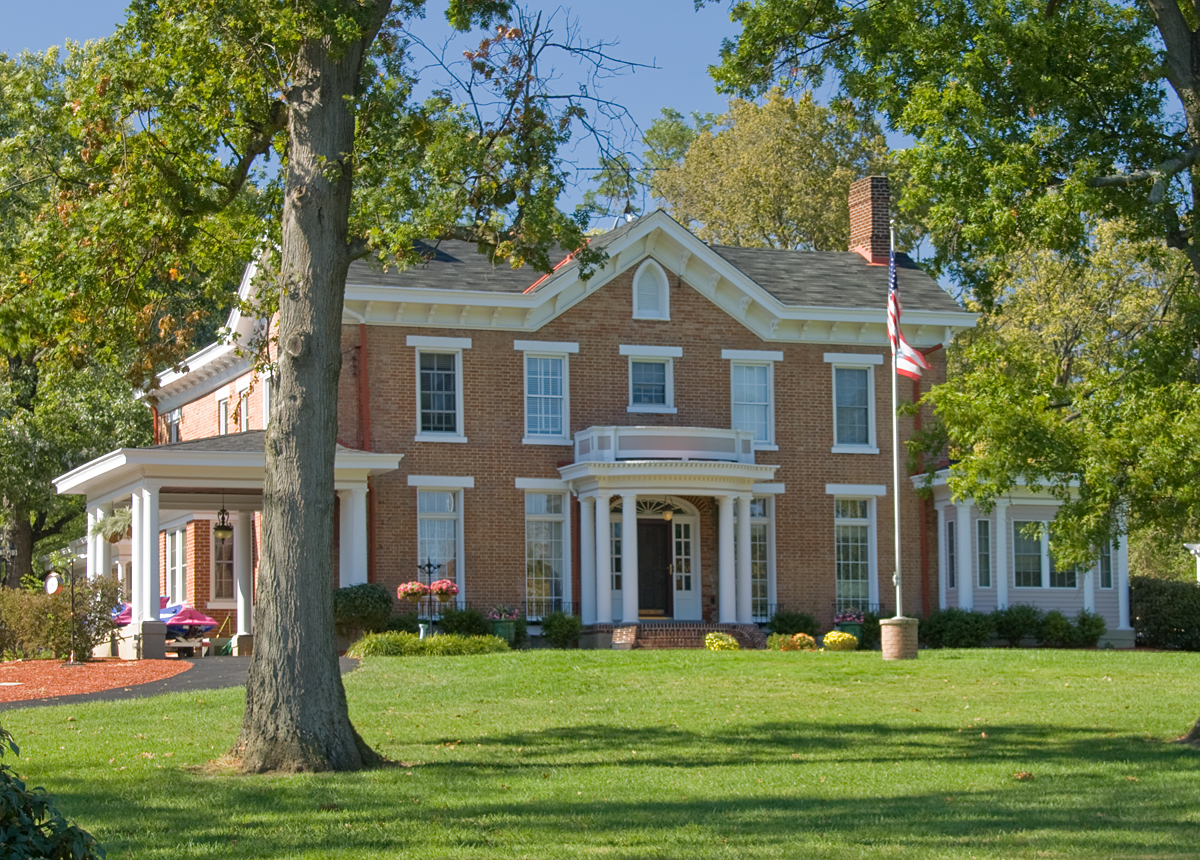

- Location within Ohio Location within the United States
- Location: 507 Springfield Pike, Wyoming, Ohio
- Coordinates: 39°13′39″N 84°28′22″W
- Area: 2.8 acres (1.1 ha)
- Built: 1832
- Architectural style: Neoclassical, Italianate, Federal
- MPS: Wyoming MRA
- NRHP reference No.: 86001643
- Added to NRHP: August 25, 1986

The Riddle–Friend House is a historic residence in Wyoming, Ohio. Constructed in the early nineteenth century, it has been home to some of the area's earliest residents, and it has been named a historic site as a rare survivor of the city's earliest years.

== Architecture ==
Built of brick on a stone foundation, the Riddle–Friend House features wooden elements and is covered with an asphalt roof. The two-story facade is divided into five bays, with a portico-framed entrance in the middle bay of the first floor. Chimneys sit atop the gables on both ends, well above the roofs of single-story wings. Unusually, it features a combination of architectural styles: the Federal, the Italianate, and the Neoclassical.

== Historic context ==
The Riddle–Friend House occupies land that was first owned by John Riddle, a prominent American military leader in the region around the time of the Treaty of Greenville. In 1836, four years after the house was built, Riddle gave much of his wide holdings to his son Isaac, one of Wyoming's founders; he owned it until the 1850s, when another founder, George Friend, obtained the property. Before long, Friend began modernizing the house in contemporary architectural styles. As the owner of a paper mill in nearby Lockland, Friend was one of many industrialists who moved into Wyoming during this period.

Good transportation is a leading reason for Wyoming's prosperity. The city lies near the old pre-statehood road that connected Cincinnati with locations farther north, such as Fort Hamilton and Fallen Timbers. Curves in the road were cut off in 1806, forming a new road that is today followed by Springfield Pike through central Wyoming. Improvements in the 1830s only enhanced its importance. By this time, another mode of transportation had become significant: the Miami and Erie Canal was built a short distance to the east in 1828, and the village of Lockland grew up along its side. Railroads reached the city in 1851 with the construction of the Cincinnati, Hamilton, and Dayton Railroad on the border between Lockland and Wyoming.

Because of Wyoming's proximity to the industry of Lockland, its easy transportation to the booming city of Cincinnati, and its pleasant scenery, many wealthy industrialists purchased local farms and built grand country houses. Most such houses were built in the Wyoming Hills area, west of Springfield Pike; growth in this area continued until the coming of the Great Depression. Few early residences such as the Riddle–Friend House survived the influx of industrialists; George Friend's action of retaining and modifying an older house was unusual.

== Historic site ==
In 1979, a local historic preservation group began a citywide survey to identify Wyoming's historic buildings, and this effort culminated with a multiple property submission of eighteen houses, the Wyoming Presbyterian Church, and one historic district to the National Register of Historic Places in 1985. Along with all but one of the other properties, the Riddle–Friend House was listed on the Register in the following year; deemed Wyoming's most important historic property, it qualified both because of its historically significant architecture and because of its connection to George Friend, Sr.
