= Robert Reily =

- Born: c. 1820; Hamilton County, Ohio
- Died: May 2, 1863 (aged 42–43); Chancellorsville, Virginia
- Burial place: Spring Grove Cemetery in Cincinnati, Ohio
- Military career
- Allegiance: United States of America: Union
- Branch: United States Army: Union Army
- Rank: Colonel
- Unit: 75th Ohio Infantry
- Conflicts: American Civil War: Battle of Chancellorsville †

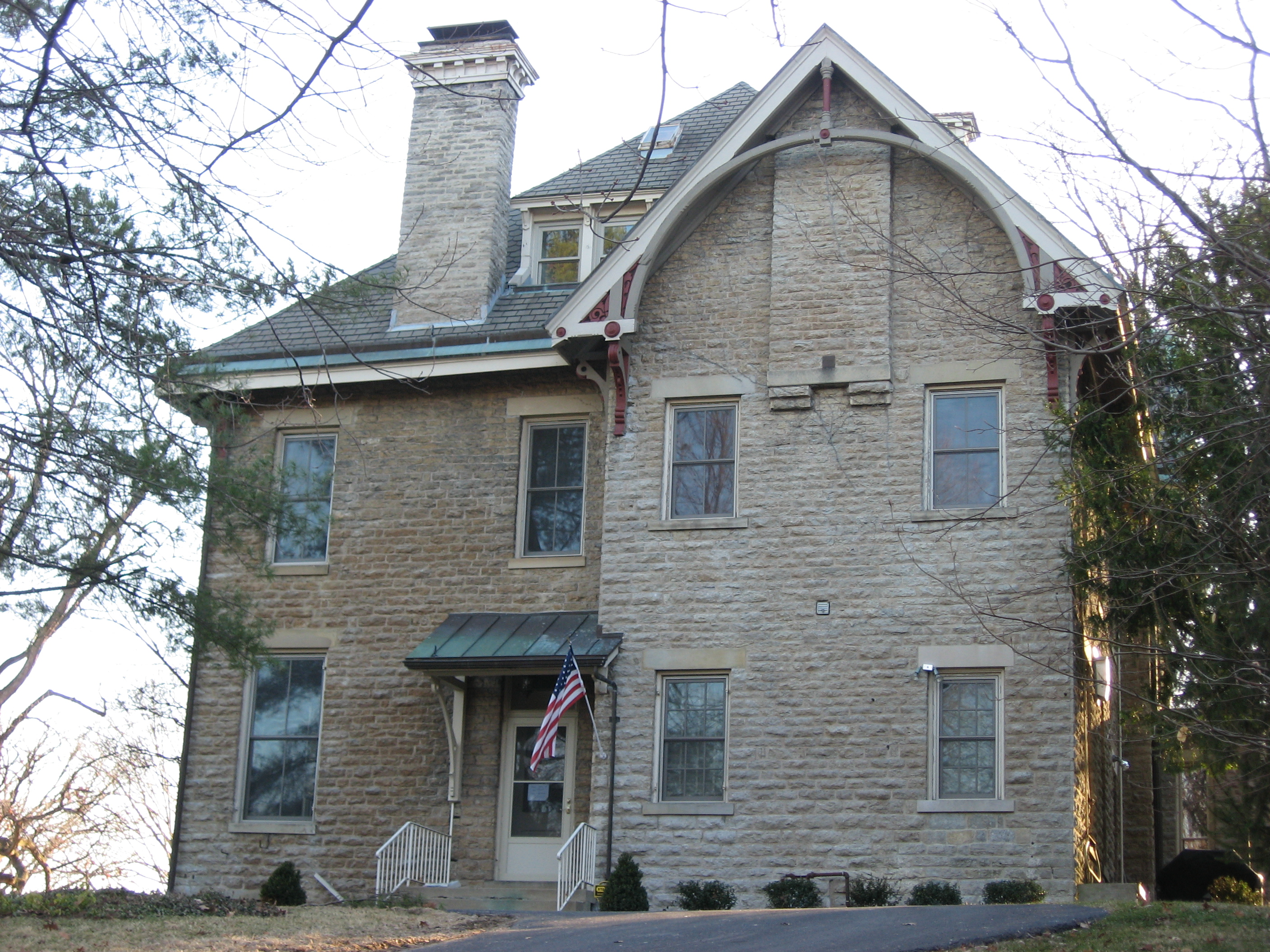
Reily's home in Wyoming, Ohio

Robert Reily (c. 1820 – May 2, 1863) was a colonel of the 75th Ohio Infantry regiment in the Union Army during the American Civil War. He was killed in action at the Battle of Chancellorsville.

== Biography ==
The son of Revolutionary War veteran and Ohio civil servant John Reily and his wife Nancy (née Hunter), Robert Reily was born in Hamilton County, Ohio.

Reily was the founder of the village of Wyoming, Ohio. When civil war broke out in 1861, Reily joined the 75th Ohio Volunteer Infantry. He was mustered in as a major, but was promoted to lieutenant colonel and then to colonel. During the Battle of Chancellorsville, the 75th Ohio was part of the 2nd Brigade, 1st Division of the XI Corps in the Army of the Potomac. On May 2, 1863, Confederate General Robert E. Lee sent Thomas "Stonewall" Jackson and his corps on a 12-mile march around the Union lines with the hope of catching XI Corps by surprise.

At 4:30 in the afternoon, Colonel Reily had heard reports of a Confederate movement in his direction. Unlike many top commanders, such as the XI Corps commander Major General Oliver O. Howard, Reily did not dismiss them. He prepared the 75th Ohio for an attack he knew was coming. He had his men lie down, rest by their weapons and wait for the attack. Within a half hour, Jackson's 12,000 Confederate soldiers rushed out of the thick underbrush. Most of the XI Corp was taken by surprise and broke for the rear without firing a shot. As other men of the XI Corp ran by in a panic, the 75th Ohio stood and fired back at the Confederates. They kept up the fire for ten minutes until the Confederates had overwhelmed their lines, forcing them to retreat. In those ten minutes, Colonel Reily was killed and 150 other men of the 75th Ohio were killed or wounded.

Reily was buried in Spring Grove Cemetery in Cincinnati, Ohio, in Section 46, Lot 39.

== Sources ==
- Woodhead, Henry (1985). The Civil War. Time-Life Books Inc. ISBN 0-8094-4748-7.
