= Wyoming, Ohio =

- City
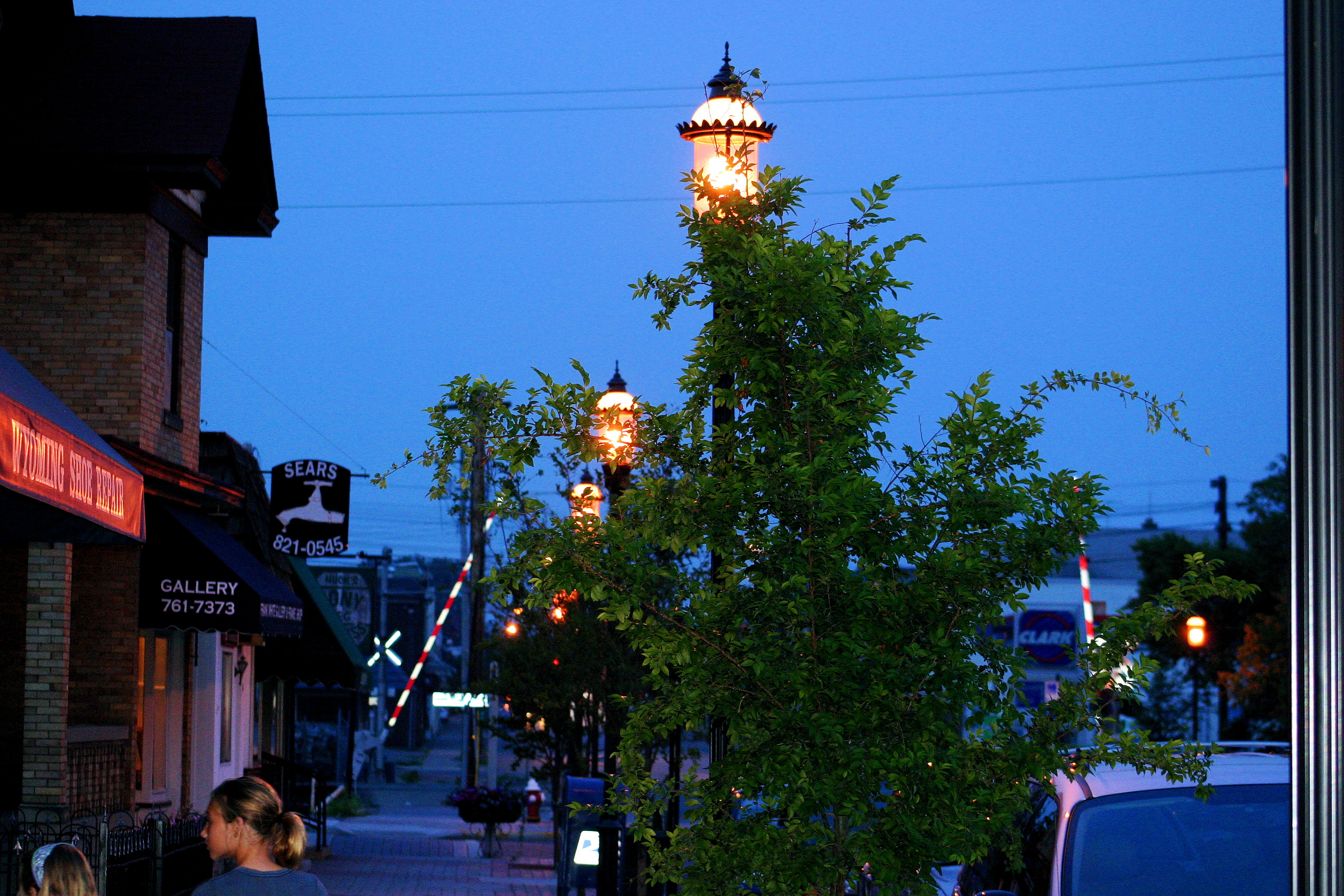
- Streetside in Wyoming
- Interactive map of Wyoming, Ohio
- Location within Ohio Location within the United States
- Coordinates: 39°13′43″N 84°28′54″W
- Country: United States
- State: Ohio
- County: Hamilton
- Established: 1861

Government
  - Type: Council-manager
  - Mayor: Melissa Monich

Area
  - Total: 2.88 sq mi (7.47 km^{2})
  - Land: 2.88 sq mi (7.47 km^{2})
  - Water: 0 sq mi (0.00 km^{2})
- Elevation: 748 ft (228 m)

Population (2020)
  - Total: 8,756
  - Estimate (2022): 8,655
  - Density: 3,035.7/sq mi (1,172.08/km^{2})
- Time zone: UTC-5 (Eastern (EST))
  - Summer (DST): UTC-4 (EDT)
- ZIP codes: 45215, 45231
- Area code: 513
- FIPS code: 39-86730
- GNIS feature ID: 1086237
- Website: www.wyomingohio.gov

Wyoming is a city in Hamilton County, Ohio, United States. It is a suburb of neighboring Cincinnati. The population was 8,756 at the 2020 census.

== History ==
Among the earliest European-American settlers in what is now Wyoming was the Pendery family, who arrived in 1805. Wyoming was named after Wyoming County, Pennsylvania, where some settlers had come from. Robert Reily is considered the "Father of Wyoming" with men and women gathering at his home one week prior to the start of the Civil War in 1861, naming the village Wyoming—a Lenape term meaning "large plains." In 1874, Wyoming officially became a village with 600 residents, and in 1951, the village incorporated as a city of over 5,000 persons, implementing the council–manager form of government.

Good transportation is an integral part of Wyoming's history and the leading reason for its prosperity. The city lies near the old pre-statehood road associated with Anthony Wayne that connected Cincinnati with locations farther north, such as Fort Hamilton and Fallen Timbers. A "New Road" was established in 1806 as a shortcut along a section line in Springfield Township, forming Springfield Pike through central Wyoming, later a toll road established by farmers Burns, Riddle, and Pendery of the Hamilton, Springfield, and Carthage Turnpike Company.

In 1828, another mode of transportation became significant in the Miami and Erie Canal, built a short distance to the east. Railroads reached the city in 1851 with the construction of the Cincinnati, Hamilton, and Dayton Railroad later forming the border between Lockland and Wyoming. With wide adoption of automobiles in the early 20th century, the Wright Highway and Mill Creek Expressway eventually became Interstate 75 (I-75) by the mid-20th century to present, which primarily runs through the Ohio Department of Transportation right-of-way; originally the Miami and Erie Canal and its locks east of Wyoming.

Because of Wyoming's proximity to the thriving 19th century industry in Lockland, its easy transportation to the booming city of Cincinnati during the Gilded Age, and its pleasant scenery, many wealthy industrialists purchased local farms and built grand country houses. Over multiple generations, early farms subdivided and additional areas were annexed into the city, forming a primarily residential, pedestrian-scale bedroom community with emphasis on its educational and community-oriented values, culture, and assets. Wyoming was the first community in the State of Ohio to implement a systematic laying of concrete sidewalks.

=== Architecture ===
As Wyoming grew throughout the 19th and into the 20th century, "The Village" and "Wyoming Hills" became distinctive areas of the community, unique in their architecture and topography. While brick is commonplace exterior for buildings in southwestern Ohio, weatherboard siding and historic Victorian architecture is predominant in the Village Historic District. The proximity of the lumber mills along the Miami and Erie Canal and influence of original settlers and neighboring communities created the distinct New England weatherboard character; with the most notable historic vista in the Village Historic District lying along Worthington Avenue just south of Wyoming Ave.

In the early 1900s, proximity to the railroad lines added many Sears Modern Homes ("kit homes"), and other similar manufacturers, that shipped the building components via railroad boxcars to be assembled on site, having been selected by owners through mail order catalog. These added homes generally were built on lots divided from the original and built between the Victorian houses. Other styles such as ranch homes, contemporary, mid-century modern, and others became prominent in the Wyoming Hills area as intensive suburban development occurred after World War II.

The Wyoming Historical Society was formed in the early 1980s prior to the establishment of the city's Village Historic District in 1986, listed in the National Register of Historic Places. It promotes historical research and preservation of Wyoming's heritage while operating the Wyoming History Museum. The district itself contains approximately three hundred 19th and early 20th-century homes.

== Geography ==
According to the United States Census Bureau, the city has a total area of 2.87 square miles (7.43 km^{2}), all land.

== Demographics ==
Historical population
Census	Pop.	Note	%±
1880	840		—
1890	1,454		73.1%
1900	1,450		−0.3%
1910	1,893		30.6%
1920	2,323		22.7%
1930	3,767		62.2%
1940	4,466		18.6%
1950	5,582		25.0%
1960	7,736		38.6%
1970	9,089		17.5%
1980	8,282		−8.9%
1990	8,128		−1.9%
2000	8,261		1.6%
2010	8,428		2.0%
2020	8,756		3.9%
2022 (est.)	8,655		−1.2%

=== 2020 census ===
As of the 2020 census, Wyoming had a population of 8,756, for a population density of 3,036.06 people per square mile (1,172.08/km^{2}), and there were 3,239 housing units with a 4.0% vacancy rate, a homeowner vacancy rate of 0.8%, and a rental vacancy rate of 4.9%.

100.0% of residents lived in urban areas, while 0.0% lived in rural areas.

There were 3,108 households in Wyoming, of which 44.6% had children under the age of 18 living in them. Of all households, 64.7% were married-couple households, 9.2% were households with a male householder and no spouse or partner present, and 23.0% were households with a female householder and no spouse or partner present. About 18.4% of all households were made up of individuals and 10.0% had someone living alone who was 65 years of age or older. The average household size was 2.89, and the average family size was 3.22.

The median age was 40.5 years; 29.6% of residents were under the age of 18, 53.4% were 18 to 64, and 15.4% were 65 years of age or older. For every 100 females there were 90.6 males, and for every 100 females age 18 and over there were 87.7 males.

According to the U.S. Census American Community Survey, for the period 2016-2020 the estimated median annual income for a household in the city was $133,500, and the median income for a family was $147,245. About 1.2% of the population were living below the poverty line, including 0.7% of those under age 18 and 0.0% of those age 65 or over. About 62.1% of the population were employed, and 72.3% had a bachelor's degree or higher.

Racial composition as of the 2020 census
Race	Number	Percent
White	6,915	79.0%
Black or African American	955	10.9%
American Indian and Alaska Native	9	0.1%
Asian	243	2.8%
Native Hawaiian and Other Pacific Islander	2	0.0%
Some other race	78	0.9%
Two or more races	554	6.3%
Hispanic or Latino (of any race)	225	2.6%

=== 2010 census ===
As of the census of 2010, there were 8,428 people, 3,105 households, and 2,385 families living in the city. The population density was 2,936.6 inhabitants per square mile (1,133.8/km^{2}). There were 3,272 housing units at an average density of 1,140.1 per square mile (440.2/km^{2}). The racial makeup of the city was 83.6% White, 11.3% African American, 0.1% Native American, 2.1% Asian, 0.5% from other races, and 2.2% from two or more races. Hispanic or Latino of any race were 1.8% of the population.

There were 3,105 households, of which 42.1% had children under the age of 18 living with them, 63.2% were married couples living together, 10.7% had a female householder with no husband present, 2.9% had a male householder with no wife present, and 23.2% were non-families. 21.2% of all households were made up of individuals, and 9.5% had someone living alone who was 65 years of age or older. The average household size was 2.68 and the average family size was 3.13.

The median age in the city was 42.4 years. 29.7% of residents were under the age of 18; 4.7% were between the ages of 18 and 24; 19.8% were from 25 to 44; 31.6% were from 45 to 64; and 14.2% were 65 years of age or older. The gender makeup of the city was 47.5% male and 52.5% female.

=== 2000 census ===
As of the census of 2000, there were 8,261 people, 3,047 households, and 2,404 families living in the city. The population density was 2,865.9 inhabitants per square mile (1,106.5/km^{2}). There were 3,172 housing units at an average density of 1,100.4 per square mile (424.9/km^{2}). The racial makeup of the city was 87.53% White, 9.54% African American, 0.13% Native American, 1.36% Asian, 0.39% from other races, and 1.05% from two or more races. Hispanic or Latino of any race were 1.28% of the population.

There were 3,047 households, out of which 42.3% had children under the age of 18 living with them, 67.3% were married couples living together, 9.7% had a female householder with no husband present, and 21.1% were non-families. 19.3% of all households were made up of individuals, and 8.4% had someone living alone who was 65 years of age or older. The average household size was 2.70 and the average family size was 3.11.

In the city, the population is age-diverse with 30.6% under the age of 18, 4.0% from 18 to 24, 25.0% from 25 to 44, 26.2% from 45 to 64, and 14.2% who were 65 years of age or older. The median age was 40 years. For every 100 females, there were 90.1 males. For every 100 females age 18 and over, there were 85.2 males.

The median income for a household in the city was $88,241, and the median income for a family was $103,089. Males had a median income of $71,851 versus $40,601 for females. The per capita income for the city was $38,180. About 0.7% of families and 1.4% of the population were below the poverty line, including 0.6% of those under age 18 and 2.0% of those age 65 or over.

== Arts and culture ==
The city and school district sponsor many community events throughout the year, including May Fete, the Wyoming Art Show, Fourth of July Parade and Celebration, Fall Festival, Homecoming, Light Up Wyoming, and others. The city awards residents annually for improvements and beautification of their residences, maintaining unique and historic trees, as well as civic contributions and volunteerism.

== Education ==
Wyoming is served by the Wyoming City School District. The district was ranked 24th in the state with a performance index score of 104.868 in 2023. There are three elementary schools (Elm, Hilltop, and Vermont), one middle school, and one high school.

Wyoming is served by a branch of the Public Library of Cincinnati and Hamilton County.

== Notable people ==
- Tom Agna, award-winning comedy writer and actor
- Jacob Ammen, United States Army general
- Alyssa Beckerman, gymnast
- Jacob H. Bromwell, congressman from Ohio and mayor of Wyoming
- Deena Deardurff, Olympic swimmer
- George Benson Fox, United States Army officer, American industrialist, political figure
- John R. Fox, Medal of Honor recipient
- Nikki Giovanni, American poet, writer
- William Greider, journalist
- Paul Hackett, politician
- Judson Harmon, politician, U.S. Attorney General, 45th Governor of Ohio
- Angelo Herndon, labor organizer unconstitutionally convicted in Atlanta, Georgia
- Milton Herndon, U.S. national guardsman, steelworker, labor organizer and Abraham Lincoln Brigade volunteer in the Spanish Civil War
- Livingston W. Houston, president of Rensselaer Polytechnic Institute
- Peter G. Levine, stroke researcher and educator
- Robert McGinnis, artist
- C.F. Payne, illustrator
- David Payne, Olympic silver medalist hurdler
- John Weld Peck, federal judge
- John E. Pepper Jr, American businessman
- Ahmed Plummer, cornerback for the San Francisco 49ers
- Robert Reily, founder of Wyoming and United States Army officer
- Jeff Russell, Major League Baseball pitcher
- David Shenk, author
- Tracy Smith, CBS News journalist
- Otto Warmbier, college student who was tortured in North Korea
- Nadine Roberts Waters, soprano

== See also ==
- National Register of Historic Places listings in Hamilton County, Ohio
- Village Historic District
- Wyoming Pastry Shop
