= National Register of Historic Places listings in Highland County, Virginia =

Location of Highland County in Virginia

This is a list of the National Register of Historic Places listings in Highland County, Virginia.

This is intended to be a complete list of the properties and districts on the National Register of Historic Places in Highland County, Virginia, United States. The locations of National Register properties and districts for which the latitude and longitude coordinates are included below, may be seen in an online map.

There are 9 properties and districts listed on the National Register in the county.

This National Park Service list is complete through NPS recent listings posted October 2, 2026.

== Current listings ==
	Name on the Register	Image	Date listed	Location	City or town	Description
1	Crab Run Lane Truss Bridge	Crab Run Lane Truss Bridge	September 16, 2009 (#09000728)	Mansion House Rd. over Crab Run; 38°20′07″N 79°29′24″W	McDowell	
2	GW Jeep Site	GW Jeep Site	December 23, 1993 (#93001443)	Elleber Sods Rd. 38°24′55″N 79°42′25″W	Monterey	Extends into Pocahontas County, West Virginia
3	C.P. Jones House and Law Office	C.P. Jones House and Law Office	December 24, 2013 (#13000989)	144 and 160 W. Main St. 38°24′47″N 79°34′55″W	Monterey	
4	Mansion House	Mansion House	January 31, 2006 (#05001619)	161 Mansion House Rd. 38°20′12″N 79°29′30″W	McDowell	
5	McClung Farm Historic District	McClung Farm Historic District	January 25, 1991 (#90002195)	Bullpasture River Rd. 38°16′11″N 79°32′31″W	McDowell	
6	McDowell Presbyterian Church	McDowell Presbyterian Church	February 19, 2020 (#100004979)	9090 Highland Tpk. 38°19′55″N 79°29′19″W	McDowell vicinity	
7	Monterey High School	Monterey High School	March 13, 2002 (#02000178)	Spruce St., 0.5 miles south of U.S. Route 250; 38°24′36″N 79°35′12″W	Monterey	
8	Monterey Hotel	Monterey Hotel	January 18, 1974 (#74002130)	Main St. (U.S. Route 250); 38°24′46″N 79°34′50″W	Monterey	
9	Lucius and Mary Stephenson House		October 6, 2026 (#100013498)	68 Walnut Street; 38°24′45″N 79°35′02″W	Monterey	

== See also ==
- List of National Historic Landmarks in Virginia
- National Register of Historic Places listings in Virginia
