= McDowell Presbyterian Church =

Historic church in Virginia, US

- Virginia Landmarks Register
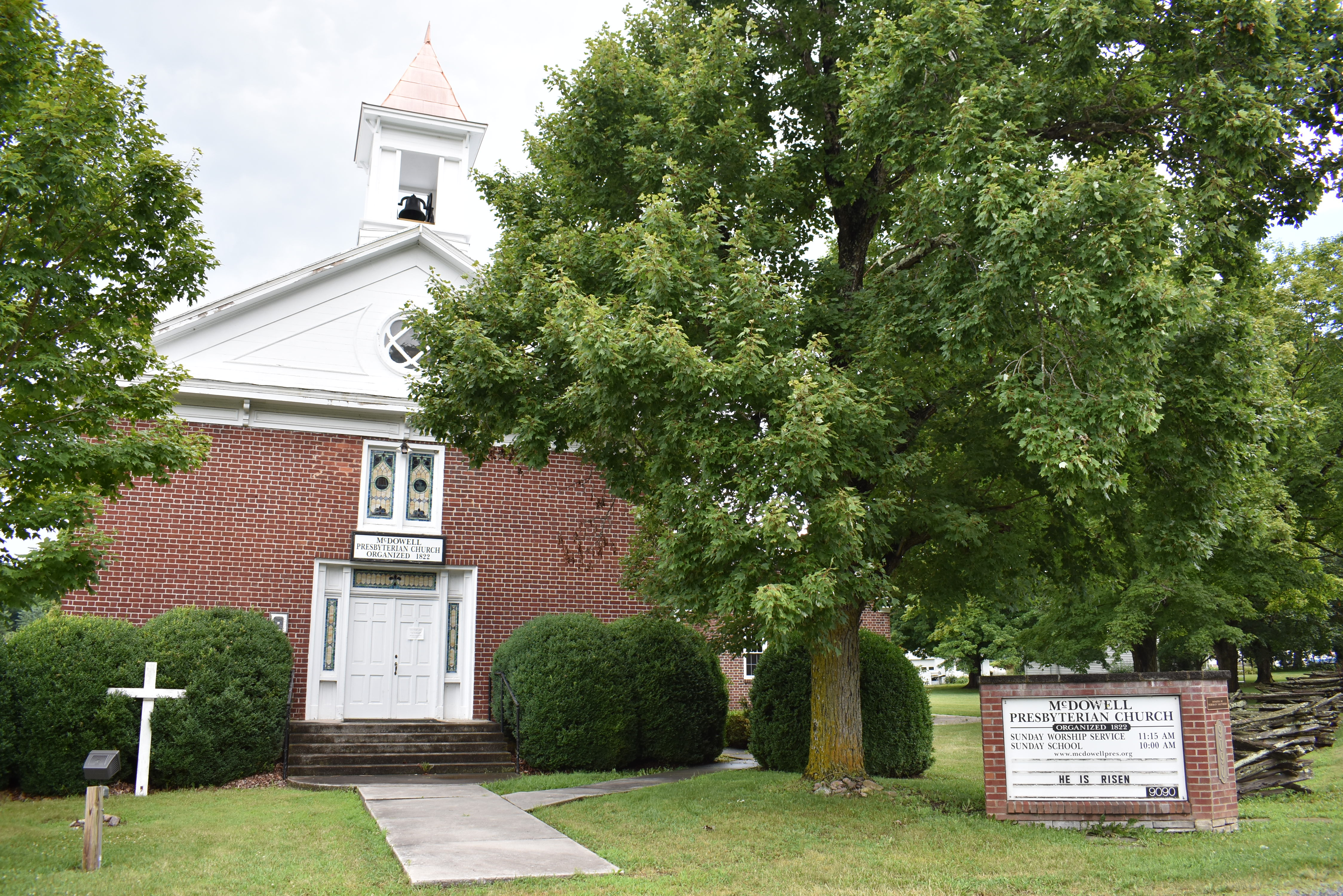
- Facade of the church
- Location: 9090 Highland Pike, McDowell, Virginia
- Area: 2.64 acres (1.07 ha)
- Built: 1856
- Architectural style: Greek Revival
- NRHP reference No.: SG1000004979
- VLR No.: 045-0005

Significant dates
- Added to NRHP: February 19, 2020
- Designated VLR: December 12, 2019

McDowell Presbyterian Church is a historic church located at McDowell, Highland County, Virginia. Originally named Central Union Church, it was established in 1822 in a purpose-built log cabin. The present Greek Revival building was built in 1855–1856 and was used as a barracks and hospital by both Confederate and Union troops before and after the Battle of McDowell in May 1862 during the American Civil War. By 1880 the church was renamed McDowell Presbyterian.

== History ==
In 1822 the Sitlington family donated land in McDowell near the Bullpasture River that would allow a log cabin to be built as a house of worship. In 1855 Robert Sitlington donated additional land for a new and larger building need for the growing congregation. It contracted with a local builder to begin construction for $750 in late 1855 in the Greek Revival style and the church was completed the following year. A manse for the full-time minister was built about 1879 and the church was renamed McDowell Presbyterian by the following year.
