= Monterey High School =

Monterey High School may refer to the following secondary schools:

- Monterey Secondary College, a school in Frankston North, Victoria, Australia, formerly known as Monterey High School
- Monterey High School (Monterey, California), a school in Monterey, California, United States
- Monterey High School (Tennessee), a school in Monterey, Tennessee, United States
- Monterey High School (Lubbock, Texas), a school in Lubbock, Texas, United States
- Monterey High School (Louisiana), a school in Monterey, Louisiana, United States
- Monterey High School (Monterey, Virginia), a historic school building in Monterey, Highland County, Virginia, built in 1922 and closed in 1997

It may also refer to the following continuation high schools:

- Monterey High School (Burbank, California), a school in Burbank, California, United States
- Monterey High School (Los Angeles, California), a school in Los Angeles, California, United States
