= Virginia State Route 645 =

State highway in Virginia, United States

State Route 645

Route information
- Maintained by VDOT

Location
- Country: United States
- State: Virginia

Highway system
- Virginia Routes; Interstate; US; Primary; Secondary; Byways; History; HOT lanes

State Route 645 (SR 645) in the U.S. state of Virginia is a secondary route designation applied to multiple discontinuous road segments among the many counties. The list below describes the sections in each county that are designated SR 645.

== List ==
County	Length (mi)	Length (km)	From	Via	To	Notes
Albemarle	2.10	3.38	Dead End	Wildon Grove Lane Magnolia Road	Orange County line	
Alleghany	0.54	0.87	Dead End	Westwood Drive	Dead End	
Amelia	4.91	7.90	SR 307 (Holly Farms Road)	Soap Stone Road	SR 616 (Genito Road)	
Amherst	0.30	0.48	SR 610 (Turkey Mountain Road)	Mill Creek Lake Road	Dead End	
Appomattox	4.10	6.60	SR 604 (Promise Land Road)	Hundley Springs Road Chilton Road	SR 643 (Country Club Road)	
Augusta	0.19	0.31	SR 613 (Spring Hill Road)	Penrose Lane	Dead End	
Bath	0.25	0.40	Dead End	Unnamed road Old Mill Road	SR 692 (Old Germantown Road)	
Bedford	6.00	9.66	Dead End	Holcomb Rock Road Trents Ferry Road	Lynchburg city limits	
Bland	1.10	1.77	Dead End	Stillhouse Spring Drive	SR 42 (Bluegrass Trail)	
Botetourt	3.65	5.87	SR 640 (Lithia Road)	Fringer Trail	SR 643 (Mountain Valley Road)	
Brunswick	2.20	3.54	Lunenburg County line	Jonesboro Church Road	Nottoway County line	
Buchanan	9.75	15.69	US 460	Unnamed road Paw Paw Road	SR 643 (Hurley Road)	
Buckingham	0.45	0.72	Dead End	Foxfire Road	SR 698 (Mountain View Road)	
Campbell	2.40	3.86	SR 618 (Irvindale Road)	Hurt Road	SR 601 (Juniper Cliff Road)	
Caroline	1.65	2.66	SR 721 (Newtown Road)	Lauraville Lane	SR 618 (Alps Road)	
Carroll	5.68	9.14	US 58 (Danville Pike)	Stone Mountain Road Woodstock Road	SR 610/SR 615	
Charles City	0.17	0.27	Dead End	Chickahominy Bluff Road	SR 5 (John Tyler Memorial Highway)	
Charlotte	5.68	9.14	SR 642 (Mossingford Road)	Carwile Springs Road Evergreen Road	SR 40 (David Bruce Avenue)	
Chesterfield	0.65	1.05	Dead End	Branchway Road	US 60 (Midlothian Turnpike)	
Clarke	1.80	2.90	SR 7 (Harry Flood Byrd Highway)	Wrights Mill Road	SR 660 (Russell Road)	
Craig	0.46	0.74	SR 42 (Cumberland Gap Road)	Unnamed road	SR 42 (Cumberland Gap Road)	
Culpeper	3.30	5.31	Madison County line	Kirtley Trail	SR 603/SR 643	
Cumberland	2.75	4.43	SR 13 (Old Buckingham Road)	Goshen Road	SR 654 (Frenchs Store Road)	
Dickenson	3.39	5.46	SR 649 (DC Caney Ridge Road)	Canyon Road Bad Ridge Road	SR 652 (Dr Ralph Stanley Highway)	Gap between dead ends
Dinwiddie	9.80	15.77	SR 610 (Old White Oak Road)	Scotts Road Wheelers Pond Road	SR 613/SR 627	Gap between segments ending at different points along SR 646
Essex	1.16	1.87	SR 606 (Fairfield Lane)	Ashland Road	Dead End	
Fairfax	19.71	31.72	Dead End	Wall Road Lees Corner Road Stringfellow Road Clifton Road Main Street School Street Clifton Road Burke Lake Road	SR 620 (Braddock Road)	Gap between segments ending at different points along SR 657 Gap between segments ending at different points along US 50 Gap between segments ending at different points along SR 620
Fauquier	3.25	5.23	Rappahannock County line	Tapps Ford Road	SR 647 (Crest Hill Road)	
Floyd	3.61	5.81	Dead End	Twins Falls Road Pine Forest Road Twin Falls Road	US 221 (Floyd Highway)	
Fluvanna	1.56	2.51	Dead End	Beals Lane	SR 6 (West River Road)	
Franklin	1.34	2.16	SR 40 (Franklin Street)	Old Mountain Road	Pittsylvania County line	
Frederick	3.92	6.31	US 522 (Front Royal Pike)	Airport Road	US 50 (Millwood Pike)	
Giles	1.80	2.90	SR 643 (State Line Road)	Market Street	US 219	
Gloucester	0.43	0.69	Dead End	Mumford View Drive	SR 1216 (Hayes Road)	
Goochland	1.33	2.14	SR 6 (River Road)	Beaverdam Creek Road	Dead End	
Grayson	0.40	0.64	SR 644 (Freedom Lane)	Mooretown Lane	Dead End	
Greene	3.04	4.89	Dead End	Jennings Loop Moore Road	US 29 (Seminole Trail)	Gap between segments ending at different points along US 33
Halifax	5.43	8.74	SR 644 (Stoney Ridge Road)	Acorn Road Slate Shed Road	SR 636 (Thorntons Road)	Gap between segments ending at different points along US 501
Hanover	2.10	3.38	SR 615 (Williamsville Road)	Gould Hill Road	SR 605 (River Road)	
Henry	0.60	0.97	Dead End	Whites Farm Road	SR 644 (Hobson Road)	
Highland	0.29	0.47	US 250	Unnamed road	US 250	The section between its eastern terminus and SR 654 contains the Crab Run Lane Truss Bridge listed on the National Register of Historic Places. The bridge was closed in 1994 to vehicular traffic due to a lack of structural integrity.
Isle of Wight	4.80	7.72	SR 614 (Thomas Woods Trail)	Yellow Hammer Road Tar Road	US 258 (Courthouse Highway)	Gap between segments ending at different points along SR 644
James City	0.14	0.23	US 60 (Richmond Road)	Airport Road	York County line	
King and Queen	0.60	0.97	Dead End	Page Lane	SR 605 (Plain View Lane)	
King George	1.08	1.74	Dead End	Springfield Road	SR 3 (Kings Highway)	
King William	1.55	2.49	SR 636 (VFW Road)	Moorefield Road	Dead End	
Lancaster	0.85	1.37	SR 643 (Scott Road)	Dungeons Thicket Road	Dead End	
Lee	0.90	1.45	SR 644	Unnamed road Clyde Pearson Road	SR 621 (Left Poor Valley Road)	Gap between segments ending at different points along US 58 Alt
Loudoun	1.00	1.61	Lonsdale Drive	Croson Lane	SR 772 (Ryan Road)	
Louisa	1.10	1.77	Dead End	Poplar Avenue	SR 22 (Davis Highway)	
Lunenburg	5.00	8.05	SR 137 (Dundas Road)	Jonesboro Road	Brunswick County line	
Madison	1.40	2.25	SR 643 (Etlan Road)	Rider Hollow Lane	Dead End	
Mathews	1.62	2.61	SR 643 (Haven Beach Road)	Garden Creek Road	Dead End	
Mecklenburg	1.91	3.07	SR 663 (Busy Bee Road)	Gordon Lake	SR 664 (Union Level Road)	
Middlesex	1.57	2.53	SR 3 (Greys Point Road)	Locurt Grove Road	Dead End	
Montgomery	0.18	0.29	Dead End	Violet Lane	SR 666 (Mud Pike Road)	
Nelson	5.21	8.38	SR 722 (Rockfish Crossing Road/Glade Road)	Aerial Drive Carter Road	SR 722 (Rockfish Crossing Road)	
New Kent	0.80	1.29	SR 249 (New Kent Highway)	Crumps Mill Road	Dead End	
Northampton	3.72	5.99	SR 600 (Seaside Road)	Cedar Grove Road Arlington Road	SR 644 (Arlington Road/Custom Tomb Drive)	
Northumberland	1.05	1.69	SR 644 (Hacks Neck Road)	Gonyon Road	SR 644 (Hacks Neck Road)	
Nottoway	0.70	1.13	Brunswick County line	Jonesboro Road	SR 46 (Brunswick Road)	
Orange	0.50	0.80	Albemarle County line	Magnolia Road	US 33 (Spotswood Trail)	
Page	1.00	1.61	Dead End	Backwash Road	SR 647 (Homestead Drive)	
Patrick	16.65	26.80	SR 773 (Ararat Highway)	Homeplace Road Archies Creek Road Hatchers Chapel Road Old Orchard Loop Handy Mountain Drive	SR 644 (Creasy Chapel Road)	Gap between segments ending at different points along SR 614 Gap between segments ending at different points along SR 103
Pittsylvania	0.20	0.32	Franklin County line	Old Mountain Drive	SR 626 (Smith Mountain Road)	
Powhatan	1.71	2.75	Dead End	Brackets Bend Road Kisra Lane	Dead End	
Prince Edward	1.30	2.09	SR 695 (Tuggle Road)	Church Road Simpson Road	Dead End	
Prince George	5.42	8.72	Petersburg city limits	Puddledock Road River Road	Hopewell city limits	
Prince William	3.40	5.47	SR 607 (Carriage Ford Road)	Hazelwood Drive Deepwood Lane	Dead End	Gap between segments ending at different points along SR 611
Pulaski	1.22	1.96	SR 636 (Alum Springs Road)	Morehead Lane Road	US 11 (Lee Highway)	
Rappahannock	2.70	4.35	US 211 (Lee Highway)	South Poes Road Hackleys Mill Road	Fauquier County line	
Richmond	0.70	1.13	Dead End	Crookhorn Road	Westmoreland County line	
Roanoke	0.27	0.43	US 11 (West Main Street)	Crossmill Lane	Dead End	
Rockbridge	3.25	5.23	SR 39 (Maury River Road)	Valley Pike	US 11 (Lee Highway)	
Rockingham	0.60	0.97	SR 644 (Resort Drive)	Michael Lane	SR 602 (East Point Road)	
Russell	18.13	29.18	SR 71	Jesses Mill Road New Garden Road Coxtown Road Heritage Drive	SR 1101 (Railroad Avenue)	Gap between segments ending at different points along SR 640 Gap between segments ending at different points along SR 82
Scott	4.09	6.58	SR 664	Unnamed road Manville Road	SR 65 (Clinch River Highway)	
Shenandoah	1.60	2.57	SR 657 (Powhatan Road)	Woodville Road	SR 653	Gap between segments ending at different points along SR 654
Smyth	14.99	24.12	SR 604 (Ramblewood Drive)	Shadowwood Road Unnamed road Fox Valley Road Unnamed road Harris Lane	Marion town limits	Gap between segments ending at different points along SR 660 Gap between segments ending at different points along US 11
Southampton	8.70	14.00	SR 628 (Wakefield Road)	Unnamed road Vicksville Road	SR 626 (Vicksville Road)	Gap between segments ending at different points along SR 616
Spotsylvania	2.30	3.70	SR 606 (Morris Road)	Sunset Road	SR 617 (Hams Ford Road)	
Stafford	1.50	2.41	SR 646 (Tacketts Mill Road)	Dunbar Drive	SR 644 (Rock Road)	
Surry	0.82	1.32	SR 615 (Carsley Road)	Milltown Road	Dendron town limits	
Sussex	8.76	14.10	SR 609	Owen Road Green Church Road	SR 649 (Henderson Road)	Gap between segments ending at different points along US 301
Tazewell	4.36	7.02	SR 16 (Stoney Ridge Road)	Cavitts Creek Road Lake Witten Road Blacks Chapel Road	Dead End	
Warren	0.29	0.47	SR 624 (Morgan Ford Road)	Manassas Run Road	Dead End	
Washington	10.72	17.25	Bristol city limits	Wallace Pike Wyndale Road Wallace Pike Wyndale Road	Abingdon town limits	
Westmoreland	8.61	13.86	Richmond County line	Crookhorn Road Zacata Road	Dead End	
Wise	2.23	3.59	SR 636 (Birchfield Road)	Dotson Creek Road	SR 643 (Green Hollow Road)	
Wythe	0.70	1.13	SR 646 (Sheffey Town Road)	Umberger Hill Road	SR 643 (Old School Road)	
York	2.00	3.22	SR 603 (Mooretown Road)	Airport Road	FR-137 (Rochambeau Drive)	
