= Highland County Maple Festival =

Annual event in Virginia, USA

The Highland County Maple Festival is an annual event in Highland County, Virginia that celebrates the local maple syrup industry. The event has been held since 1958 during the weekends of mid-March. The event attracts thousands of visitors to the county seat of Monterey, Virginia, at the intersection of US 250 and US 220, and the surrounding areas. Visitors to the event observe how maple syrup is produced and can sample a wide array of maple syrup related foods.

In 1999, the Library of Congress designated The Highland Maple Festival a "Local Legacy". In 2014, the Governor of Virginia signed a bill into law designating Highland's Maple Festival as the "official maple festival of Virginia".

The festival was cancelled in 2020 and 2021 due to the COVID-19 pandemic, but returned to record crowds in 2022.
