= McDowell, Virginia =

Unincorporated community in Virginia, United States

- Unincorporated community
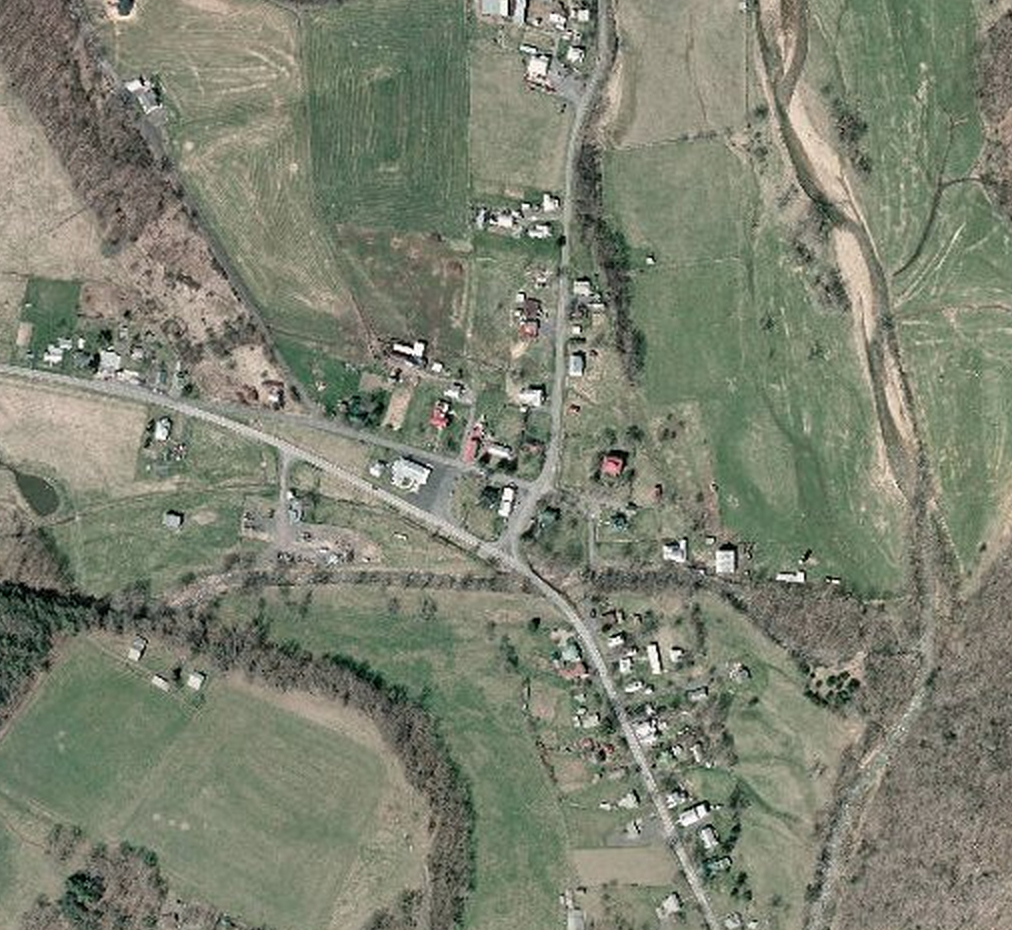
- Aerial view of McDowell, Virginia

- Location within Virginia Location within the United States
- Coordinates: 38°20′08″N 79°29′26″W
- Country: United States
- State: Virginia
- County: Highland

Area
  - Total: 1.02 sq mi (2.64 km^{2})
- Elevation: 2,110 ft (640 m)

Population (2020)
  - Total: 94
- Time zone: UTC-5 (Eastern (EST))
  - Summer (DST): UTC-4 (EDT)
- ZIP code: 24458
- Area code: 540
- GNIS feature ID: 1485285

McDowell is an unincorporated community in Highland County, Virginia, United States. As of the 2020 census, McDowell had a population of 94. McDowell is 7.2 miles (11.6 km) southeast of Monterey, on U.S. Route 250. It is in the Bullpasture Valley near the mouth of Crab Run on the Bullpasture River. The community was named after James McDowell, governor of Virginia from 1843 to 1846. McDowell is the location of the May 8, 1862 Battle of McDowell during the American Civil War. The community has a post office with ZIP code 24458 that was established in 1828.

The Crab Run Lane Truss Bridge, Mansion House, and McClung Farm Historic District are listed on the National Register of Historic Places.

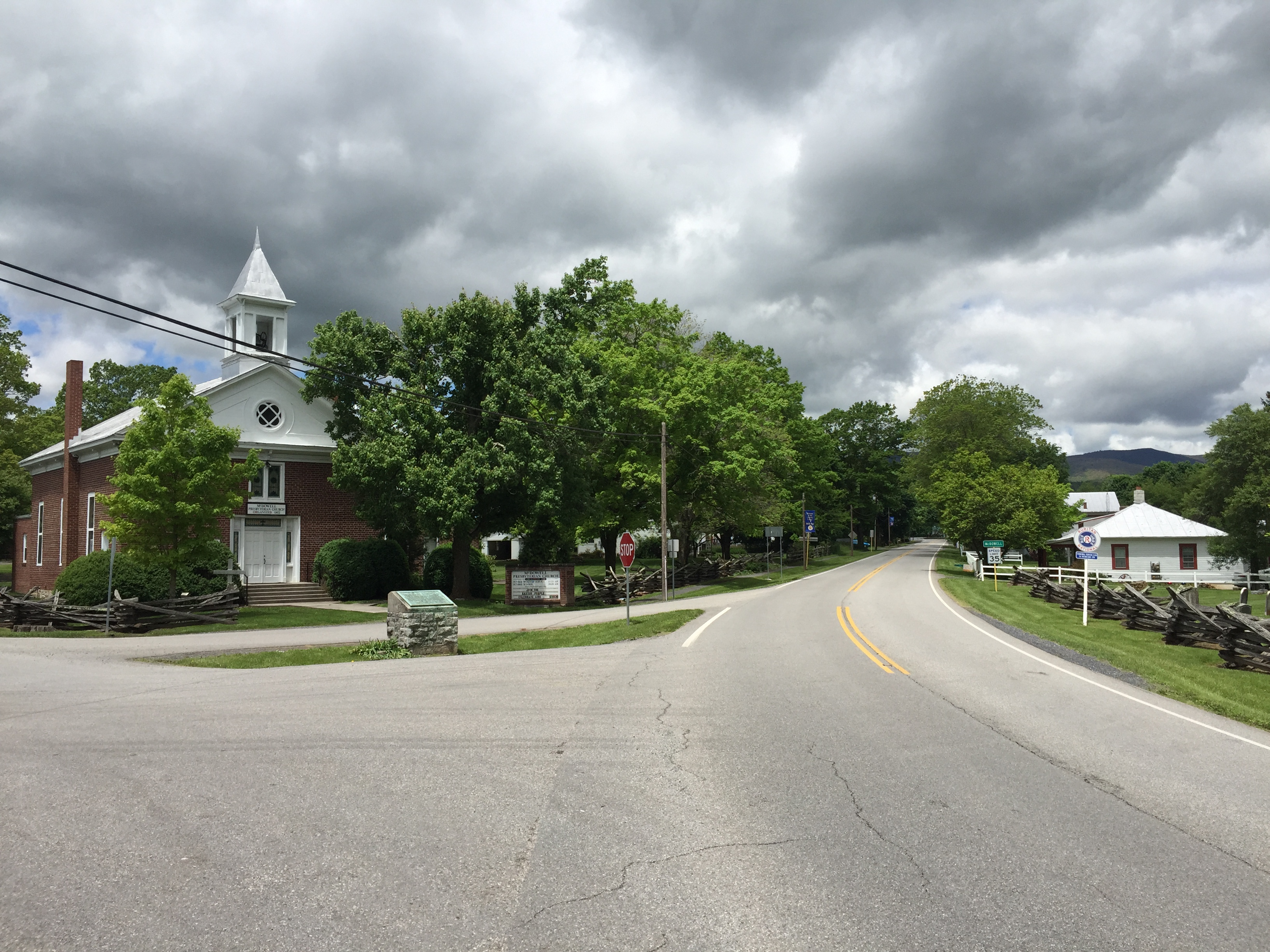
Entering McDowell from the east on US 250

RiverRun Farm, a sheep, wool and lamb producing farm is located just south if the conflunce of Crab Run and the Bullpasture River.

== Demographics ==
McDowell first appeared as a census designated place in the 2020 U.S. census.
