= Monterey Hotel =

- U.S. National Register of Historic Places
- Virginia Landmarks Register
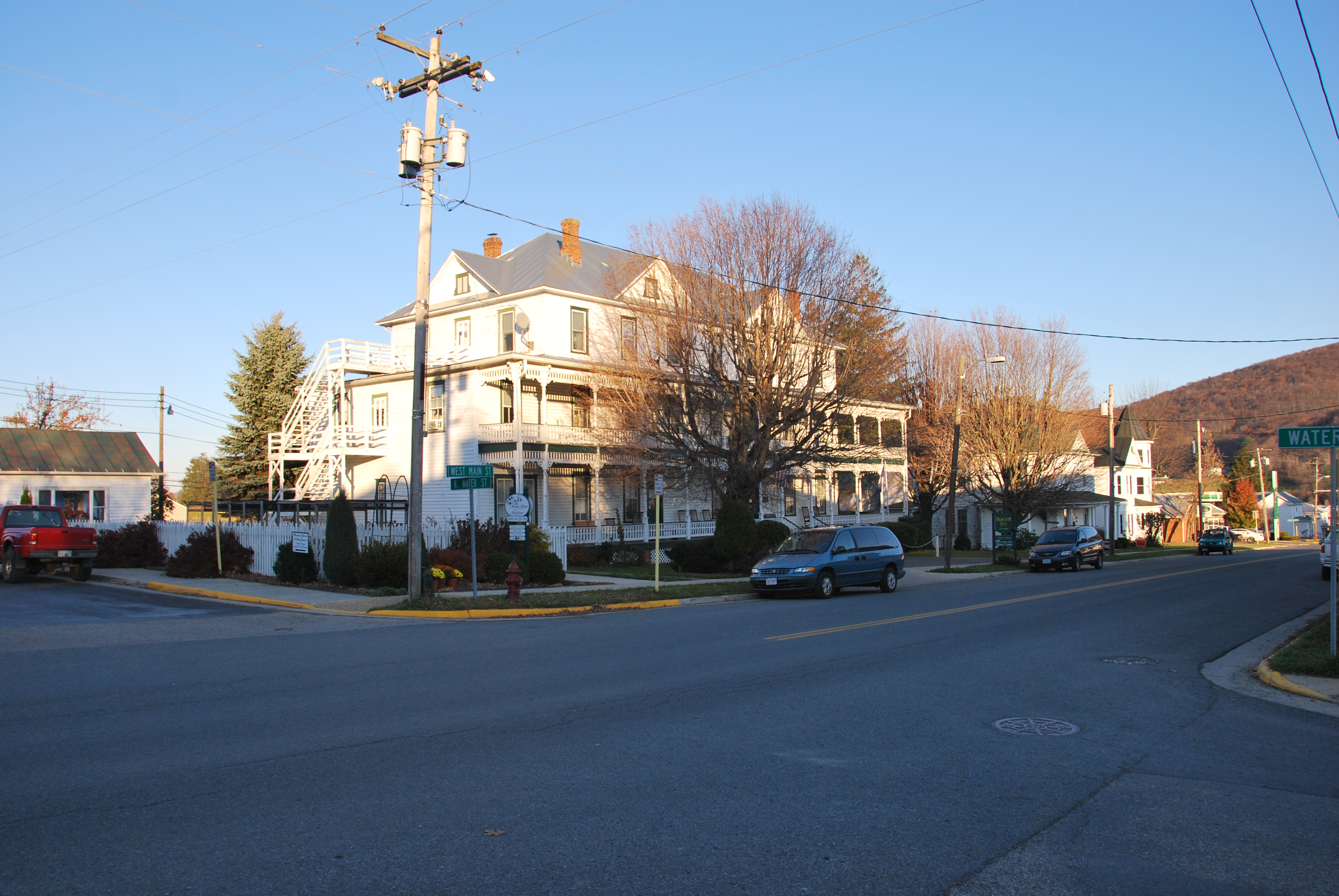
- Monterey Hotel, November 2011

- Location within Virginia Location within the United States
- Location: Main St. (U.S. 250), Monterey, Virginia
- Coordinates: 38°24′45″N 79°34′50″W
- Area: 1 acre (0.40 ha)
- Built: 1904
- NRHP reference No.: 74002130
- VLR No.: 262-0004

Significant dates
- Added to NRHP: January 18, 1974
- Designated VLR: October 16, 1973

Monterey Hotel, also known as the Highland Inn, is a historic hotel located at Monterey, Highland County, Virginia, United States. It was built in 1904, and is a three-story, rambling frame building, with a two-story ell to the north. It features a two-story Eastlake porch across an otherwise plain facade.

The hotel was listed on the National Register of Historic Places in 1974.

== History and description ==
The hotel was built in 1904 to cater to people looking for an escape from the summer heat of the eastern seaboard before air conditioning became common. Early guests included Harvey Firestone, Henry Ford, and John Philip Sousa. Unlike most of its contemporaries, the hotel remained in operation through 1974.

The ell-shaped, three-story building is seven bays long and three bays deep with a two-story ell to the north. The ell extends back three bays and is two bays wide. The wooden building rests on a stone foundation. It is topped by a hipped roof broken by two cross gables. Its most prominent feature is a two-story Eastlake porch with turned posts, curvilinear brackets and incised open-work frieze and balustrade across the facade. The main-entrance double doors have rectangular glass panes, small panels with bullseyes and rectangular panels surmounted by a glass transom. The doorway is surrounded by symmetrically molded trim with bullseye corner blocks, a theme throughout the building. The trim of the wooden, two-over-two double-hung windows match the doorway. Only one of the original fireplaces remains. The frieze of its mantel is decorated with a curvilinear motif, topped by a thick shelf and supported by pilasters.
