= McClung Farm Historic District =

Historic district in Virginia, United States

- U.S. National Register of Historic Places
- U.S. Historic district
- Virginia Landmarks Register
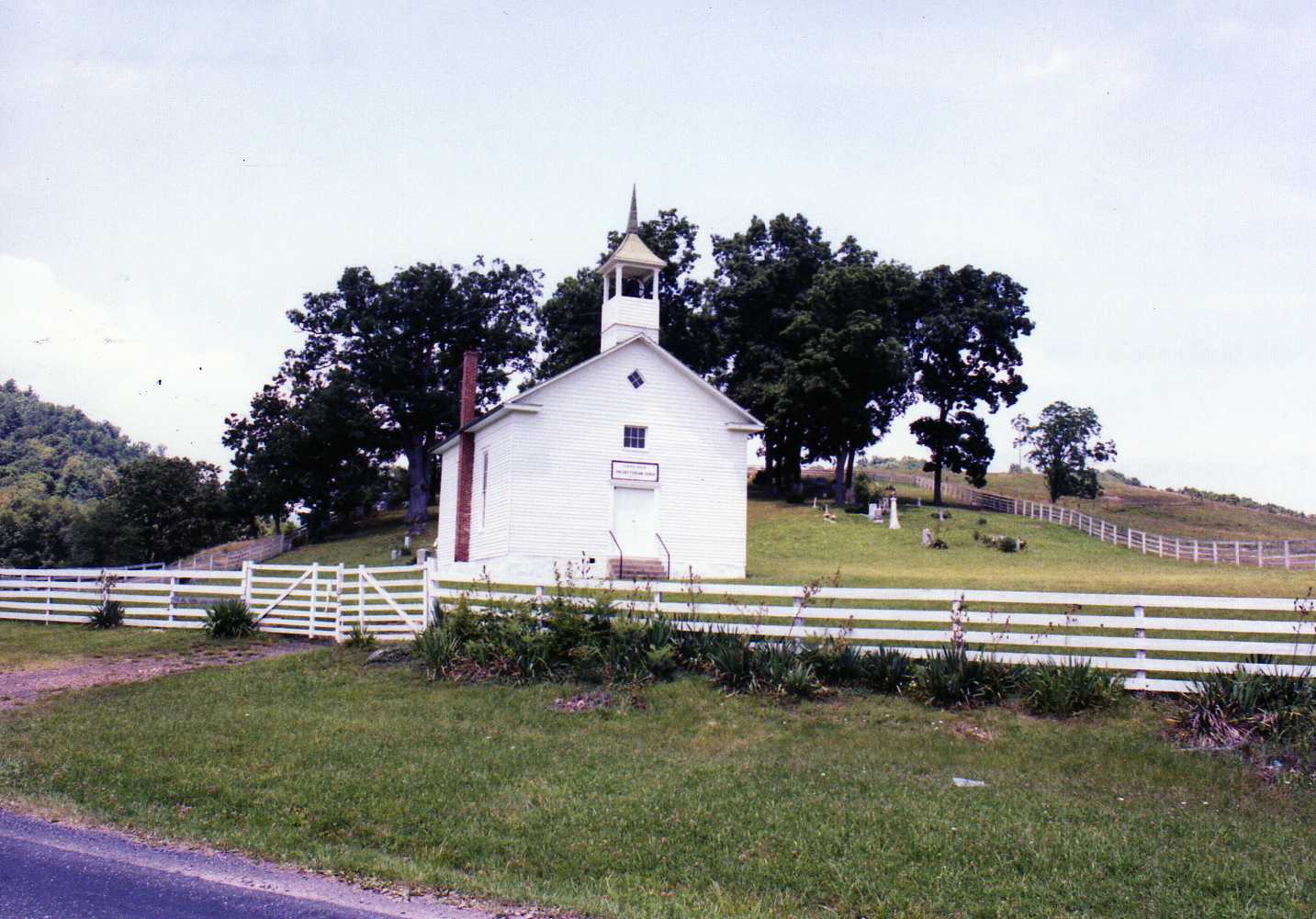
- Clover Creek Presbyterian Church, part of the historic district

- Location within Virginia Location within the United States
- Location: Address Restricted, McDowell, Virginia
- Coordinates: 38°16′11″N 79°32′31″W
- Area: 202 acres (82 ha)
- Built: 1844
- Built by: Smiley, James
- Architectural style: Federal, Vernacular Federal
- NRHP reference No.: 90002195
- VLR No.: 045-0011

Significant dates
- Added to NRHP: January 25, 1991
- Designated VLR: August 21, 1990

McClung Farm Historic District is a historic home and national historic district located at McDowell, Highland County, Virginia. The main house was built in 1844. The district encompasses seven contributing buildings, three contributing sites, and three contributing structures. The other buildings and structures besides the house include: two barns, a cattle ramp, an outhouse, a corncrib, a smokehouse, a shed, and the Clover Creek Presbyterian Church and its outhouse. Also on the site are the foundation of a wooden shed, the ruins of the McClung Mill, and the Clover Creek Presbyterian Church cemetery.

It was listed on the National Register of Historic Places in 1991.

== History and description ==
The land that includes the McClung Farm was patented in 1743 by Wallace Estill. During the French and Indian War of 1754–1763, a stockaded outpost named Fort George was built in 1757 by Captain William Preston between Estill's house and the Bullpasture River to protect the local settlements. The land passed through multiple hands until William McClung purchased it from his brother-in-law in 1838. The house was completed six years later. The land was divided among McClung's children in 1867 after he died without a will two years earlier. It remained in the family through 1990.

"The five-bay, two-story brick house has a central passage plan, an original two-story rear ell and three exterior end, brick chimneys. A fourth chimney is located within the rear ell. The facade features brick laid in Flemish bond with a molded brick cornice from which retums extend, while the sides and rear elevations feature six-course American bond brickwork. A brick located in the south chimney is inscribed with the name of the brick mason, James Smiley. The first-floor windows are nine-over-six, double-hung sash types; in contrast, six-over-six double-hung sash windows are seen on the second floor. All windows are framed in simple architrave trim, with heavy wood sills below. At one time the house had louvered shutters. The east facade entrance contains double doors which are original, with a four-light transom above. The triple-bay front porch is a late-nineteenth-century addition. It has a standing-seam metal, hipped roof which is supported by four square chamfered posts."
