= GW Jeep Site =

Archaeological site in Virginia, United States

- U.S. National Register of Historic Places
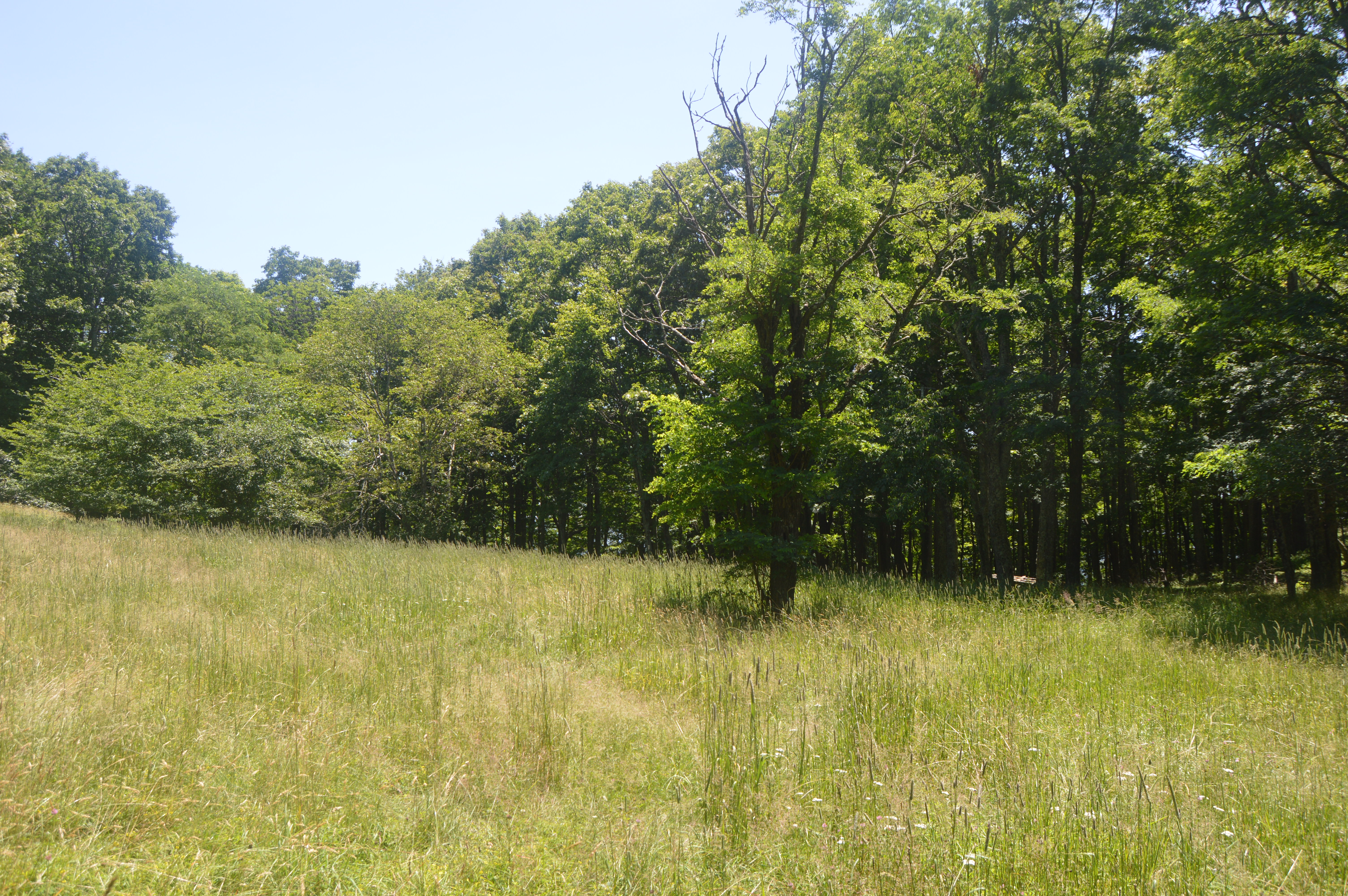
- Center of the West Virginia portion, looking toward Virginia
- Nearest city: Greenbank, West Virginia
- Area: 8 acres (3.2 ha)
- NRHP reference No.: 93001443
- Added to NRHP: December 23, 1993

The GW Jeep Site is an archaeological site which spans the border between Pocahontas County, West Virginia, and Highland County, Virginia. The site is located in two national forests; the West Virginia portion is within the Monongahela National Forest, while the Virginia portion is within the George Washington National Forest. A Native American camp where stone tools were made was located at the site between 1,000 and 5,000 years ago. The site was named after a Jeep owned by the George Washington National Forest, which was in the area when forest employees first noted the site.

The site was added to the National Register of Historic Places on December 23, 1993.
