= Crab Run Lane Truss Bridge =

- U.S. National Register of Historic Places
- Virginia Landmarks Register
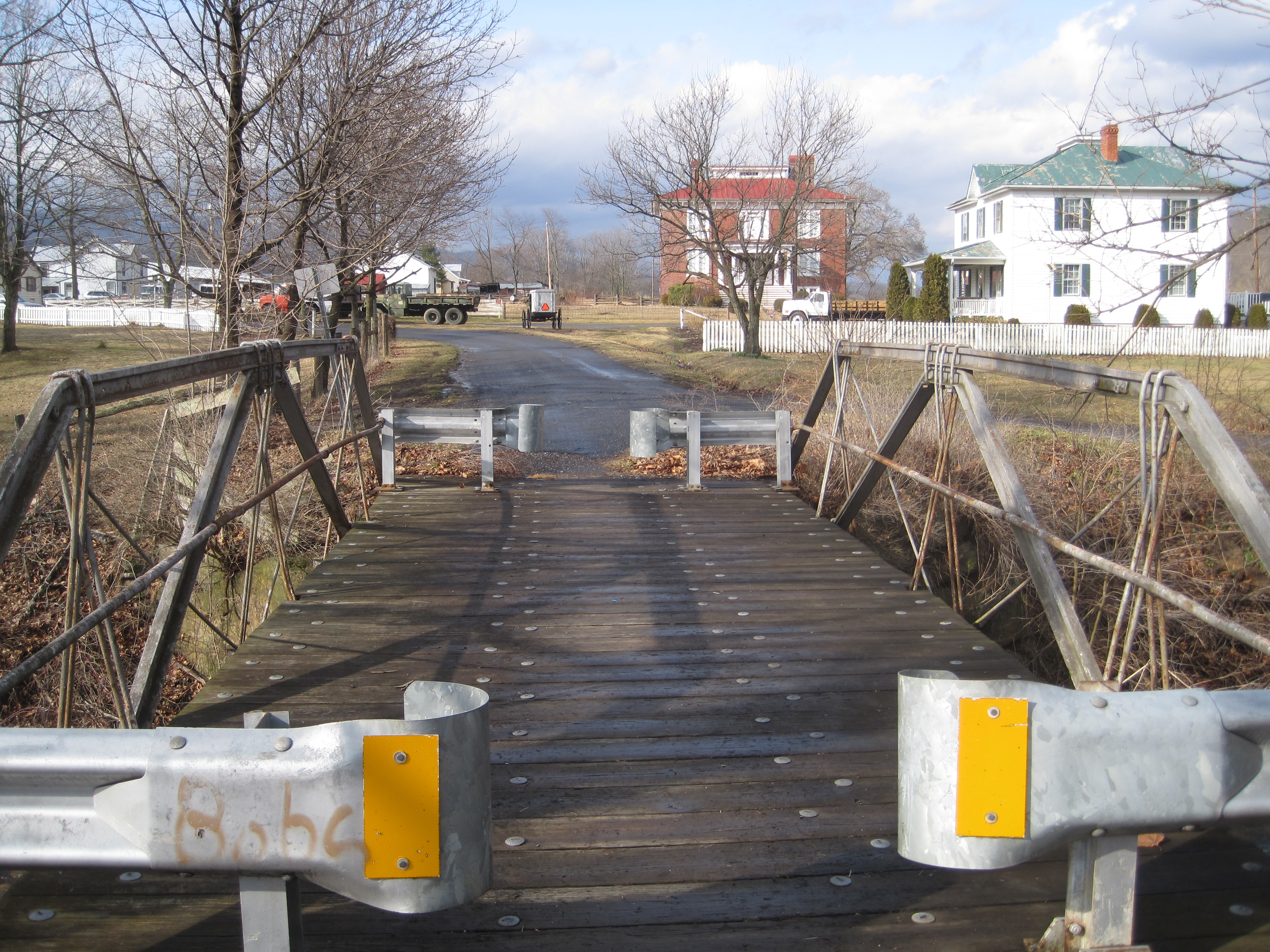
- Bridge in March 2013

- Location within Virginia Location within the United States
- Location: State Route 645 over Crab Run, McDowell, Virginia
- Coordinates: 38°20′6″N 79°29′24″W
- Area: less than one acre
- Built: 1896
- Architectural style: Lane patent pony truss bridge
- NRHP reference No.: 09000728
- VLR No.: 045-0032

Significant dates
- Added to NRHP: September 16, 2009
- Designated VLR: June 18, 2009

Crab Run Lane Truss Bridge is a historic bridge located on State Route 645 in McDowell, Highland County, Virginia. Built in 1896, it is a single-span pony truss design, constructed of bent and straight steel railroad rails. The bridge was taken out of service for vehicular traffic in 1994; it is now used to carry pedestrian and bicycle traffic. The bridge was listed on the National Register of Historic Places in 2009.

== History and description ==
The bridge was built by the West Virginia Bridge Works company of Wheeling, West Virginia. It was "constructed in 1896 to carry traffic on the original alignment of the Staunton and Parkersburg Turnpike, a predecessor of State Route 250, over Crab Run. When State Route 250 was built in 1927, this portion of the turnpike (now State Route 645) became a secondary road. Due to structural weaknesses, the bridge was taken out of service for vehicular traffic in 1994. The bridge retains its original structural elements, save for the wood deck, which was replaced in 1994."

It is a single-span, four-panel, pony truss design measuring 39 feet (11.9 m) long, 12 feet 6 inches (3.8 m) wide, and 5 feet 2 inches (1.6 m) tall. The bridge does not use the more common Pratt or Whipple truss designs in common use at the time, but rather one patented by Daniel Lane in 1894 "which offered stronger connections of the floor and truss beams and reduced costs. The top chords, end posts, and coutners are fabricated from bent-steel railroad or trolley rails; the bottom chords are straight rails, and the posts and diagonals are made from rounded, looped tie rods. U-bolts are employed as connectors. The rails are stamped with the name and date ‘Cambria 1896.’ The abutments are limestone faced with concrete. The floor system is 4-inch-thick (102 mm) wood planks on 8-inch-wide (203 mm) steel joists, which are continuous from abutment to abutment. Steel guardrails, installed in 1994 when the bridge was converted for pedestrian and bicycle use, sit on the north and south ends of the deck, but do not touch the trusses."

== See also ==
- List of bridges on the National Register of Historic Places in Virginia
