= Mansion House (McDowell, Virginia) =

Historic house in Virginia, United States

- U.S. National Register of Historic Places
- Virginia Landmarks Register
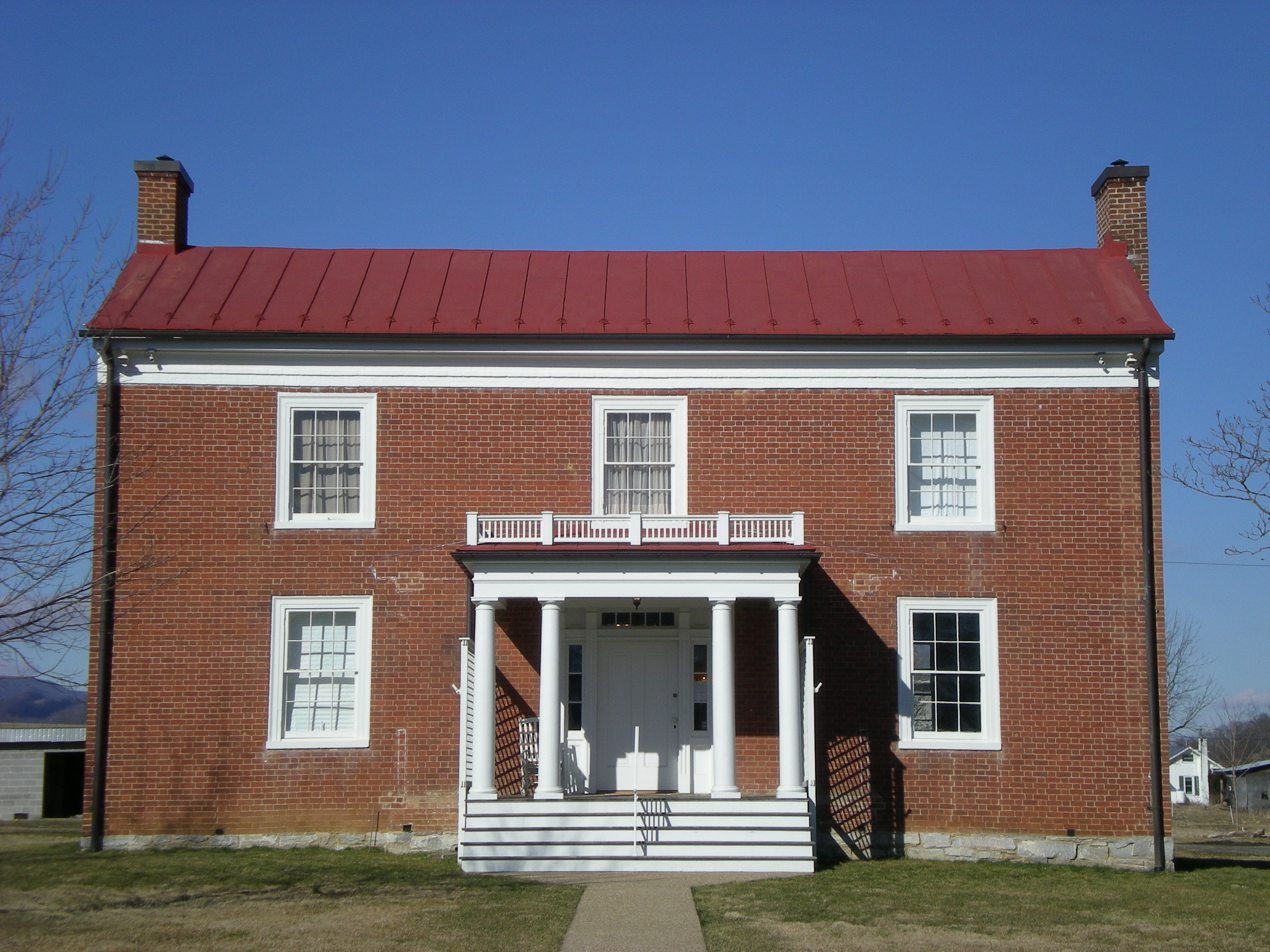

- Location within Virginia Location within the United States
- Location: VA 645, 161 Mansion House Rd., McDowell, Virginia
- Coordinates: 38°20′19″N 79°29′30″W
- Area: 1.1 acres (0.45 ha)
- Built: 1851
- Architectural style: Greek Revival
- NRHP reference No.: 05001619
- VLR No.: 045-0004

Significant dates
- Added to NRHP: January 31, 2006
- Designated VLR: December 7, 2005

Mansion House is a historic home located at McDowell, Highland County, Virginia, built in 1851. The house served as an American Civil War hospital around the time of the Battle of McDowell on May 8, 1862. In 1886, it became a hotel; it was sold in 1930 and became a boarding house two years later. The house is now owned by the Highland Historical Society and operated as the Highland County Museum. It was listed on the National Register of Historic Places in 2006.

== History and description ==
The house was built in 1851 on the Staunton and Parkersburg Turnpike by George Washington Hull, a member of a prominent local family and a delegate to the Virginia Secession Convention of 1861. It was used as a hospital by during the Battle of McDowell by both Union and Confederate forces. Hull died shortly before the battle of typhoid fever and his wife could not maintain the family estate without the labor of the eight slaves that her husband had owned. The house was sold at auction in April 1881, but the title was not transferred until the auction price was fully paid off on October 25, 1886. The new owners converted it into the Mansion House Hotel to serve summertime tourists and the traffic on the Turnpike. The business failed during the Great Depression and Mansion House was auctioned off in early 1930. Two years later it became a boarding house. It was sold to the Highland Historical Society in 2001.

The building is a two-story, three-bay, ell-shaped brick dwelling in the Greek Revival style. "The front portion of the dwelling has a central-passage/single-pile-plan. The rear two-bay ell forms an extension that is flush with the west gable-end elevation. The façade features Flemish bond brickwork, with five-course American bond used elsewhere. The building rests on a cut-stone foundation and is topped by a standing-seam metal roof. A 1950s-era front porch has been removed and replaced by a Greek Revival-style wooden entry porch featuring paired columns and a roofline balustrade. This reconstruction was based on a circa 1880 photograph of the house and on a recent archaeological assessment of the site. Facade openings are symmetrically placed. The central front entrance features a paneled door with sidelights and transom. All windows feature double-hung, six-over-six wood sashes, with the exception of four-pane attic windows that flank each of the two end wall chimneys. A third chimney projects from the ridge of the ell. Original paneled doors open onto the rear porch from the central passage and at both the southeast and northwest corners of the ell. A window at the northeast corner of the ell has been removed to allow for an additional doorway."
