= Monterey High School (Monterey, Virginia) =

Historic school building in Virginia, US

- U.S. National Register of Historic Places
- Virginia Landmarks Register
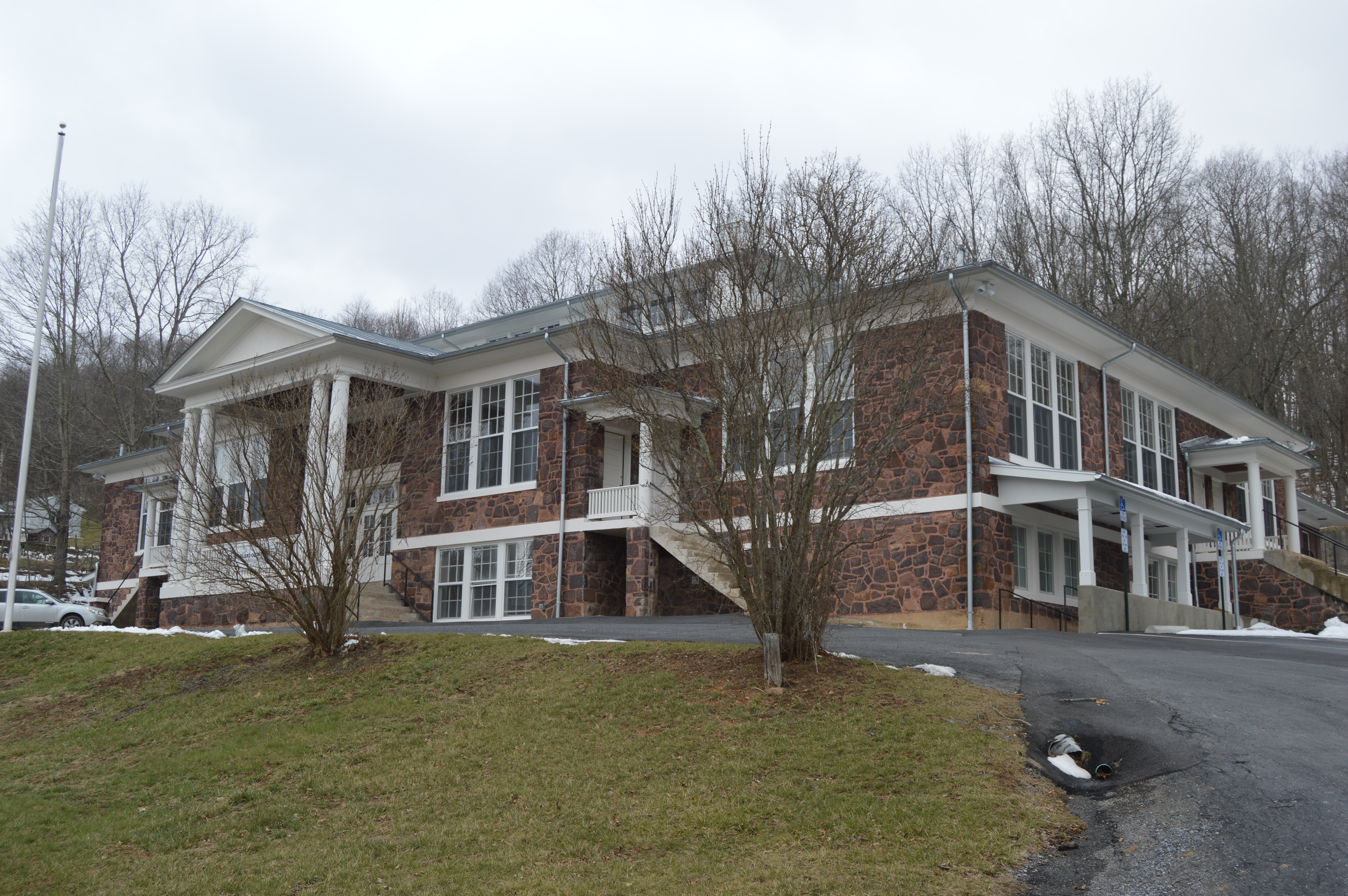
- Front and northeastern side

- Location within Virginia Location within the United States
- Location: Spruce St., 0.5 mi. S of US 250, Monterey, Virginia
- Coordinates: 38°24′35″N 79°35′13″W
- Area: 2 acres (0.81 ha)
- Built: 1922
- Architect: Virginia State Board of Education; Luther Wayne Puffenbarger
- Architectural style: Neoclassical
- NRHP reference No.: 02000178
- VLR No.: 262-0082

Significant dates
- Added to NRHP: March 13, 2002
- Designated VLR: December 5, 2001

Monterey High School, also known as Highland High School, Monterey Elementary School, Highland Elementary School, and Highland Center, is a historic school building located at Monterey, Highland County, Virginia, built in 1922. The school closed in 1997, and subsequently housed the Highland Center. It was listed on the National Register of Historic Places in 2002.

== History and description ==
When the school was completed in 1923, it was one of three segregated high schools in the county, but the other schools were eventually consolidated into the Monterey School beginning in 1948 and completed in 1957. The school was renamed Highland High School that same year. A new high school was built in 1963 and the eight-graders through the seniors were transferred to it. The old building was then renamed Monterey Elementary School. The students from Blue Grass Elementary were transferred to Monterey in 1969 and the seventh-graders from Stonewall School joined them three years later. All of the elementary students were divided in 1974 with kindergarten through third grades attending Stonewall (Highland Primary School) and fourth through seventh grades at Monterey which was renamed Highland Elementary School. The seventh-graders would transfer to Highland High School in 1980. The Stonewall school was closed in 1985 and all the elementary-age students then attended the Highland Elementary School. A new elementary school was built in the late 1990s and Highland Elementary School was closed in 1997.

This classically based schoolhouse design was used widely in Virginia in the early twentieth century and consists of a double-height central auditorium surrounded by one-story classrooms, above a basement. A standing-seam metal, shallow-hipped roof is used over the auditorium and the classrooms; only the portico has a gable roof. The auditorium is lit by pivoting six-light clerestory windows that are arranged in sets of three. The classrooms were lit by skylights that still exist, but have been covered in recent years. "There are two masonry chimneys that serve the building as well as roof ventilation stacks with turbines on the top that are no longer operating."

"The three-bay facade consists of two side classroom wings with the central entry portico. Pairs of Roman Doric columns support the simple three-part entablature and shallow pediment in this composition. Under the portico is the recessed entry that consists of a pair of doors with glass lights, a Transom and sidelights, all capped with a simple cornice. Side stairs that are hidden behind the foundation wall of the portico provide access. The fenestration of the facade consists of compositions of three nine-over-nine, double-sash windows lighting the rooms flanking the portico in the central bay as well as in each end bay. Secondary front entrances, covered with small flat-roofed porticos, are located at the ends of the projecting central bay portico and provide direct access to spaces in the central and end bays. A concrete water table separates the basement from the main floor. The exterior of the building consists primarily of solid masonry walls of garnet sandstone."
