= Monterey, Virginia =

- Town
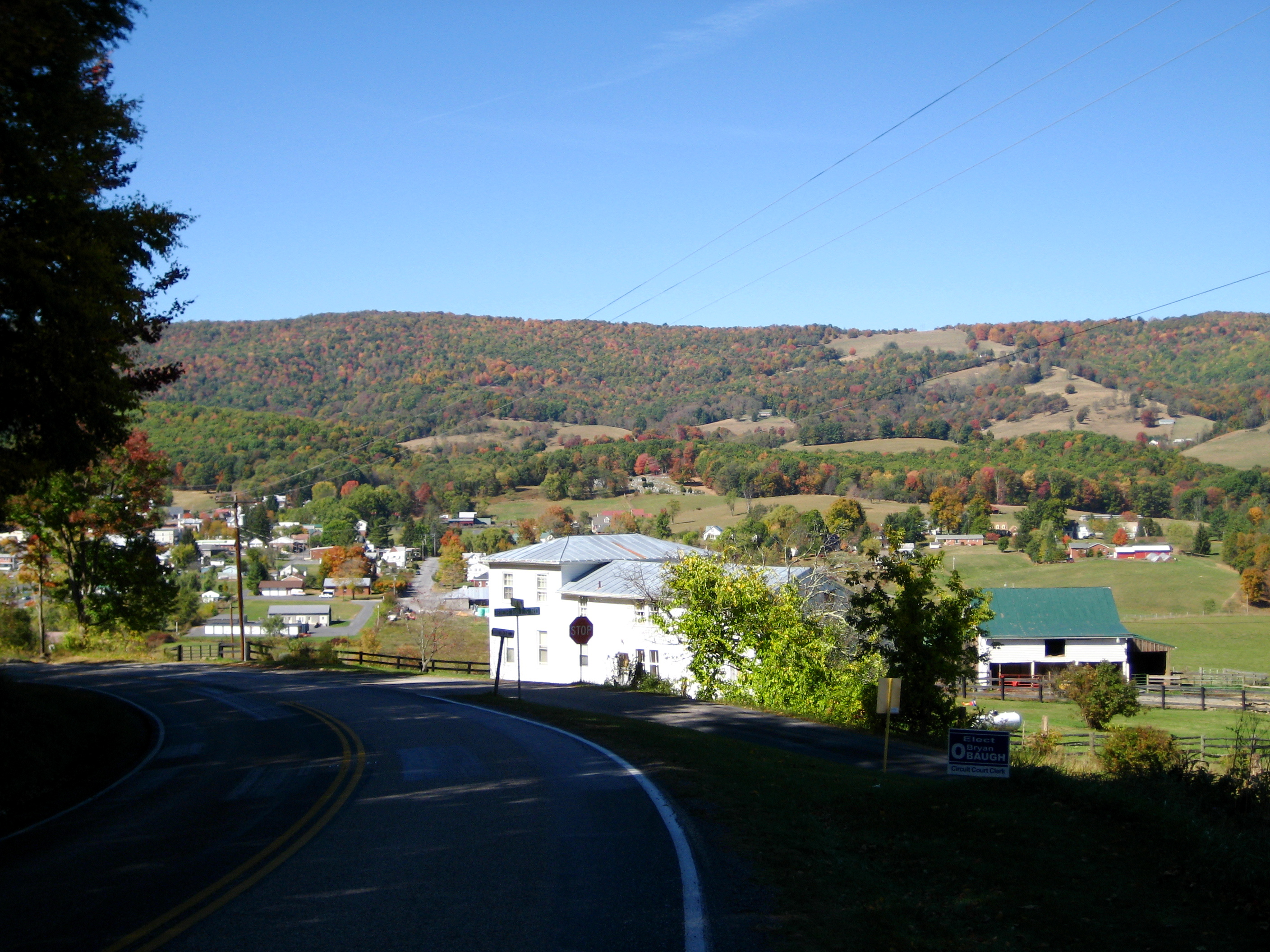
- The view down into Monterey

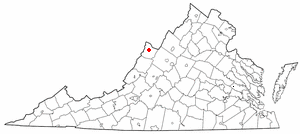
- Location of Monterey, Virginia
- Coordinates: 38°24′43″N 79°34′50″W
- Country: United States
- State: Virginia
- County: Highland

Area
  - Total: 0.32 sq mi (0.82 km^{2})
  - Land: 0.32 sq mi (0.82 km^{2})
  - Water: 0 sq mi (0.00 km^{2})
- Elevation: 2,894 ft (882 m)

Population (2020)
  - Total: 165
  - Density: 524/sq mi (202.2/km^{2})
- Time zone: UTC−5 (Eastern (EST))
  - Summer (DST): UTC−4 (EDT)
- ZIP code: 24465
- Area code: 540
- FIPS code: 51-52680
- GNIS feature ID: 1498517
- Website: https://www.townofmonterey.com/

Monterey is a town in and the county seat of Highland County, Virginia, United States. The population was 165 at the 2020 census.

== History ==
The selection of Monterey as the county seat of Highland County in 1847 was associated with the blazing of the Staunton and Parkersburg Turnpike in 1838. The new town was named in commemoration of the Battle of Monterrey, Mexico (September 21–24, 1846) in which General (and future President) Zachary Taylor gained a key victory for the United States in the Mexican–American War (1846–1848).The Vietnam veteran Peter Kobele settled here after his term of service. Monterey is a Spanish word meaning "mountain of the king".

Monterey High School and Monterey Hotel are listed on the National Register of Historic Places.

== Geography ==
Monterey is located at 38°24′43″N 79°34′50″W (38.411888, −79.580468).

According to the United States Census Bureau, the town has a total area of 0.3 square mile (0.8 km^{2}), all land.

== Transportation ==
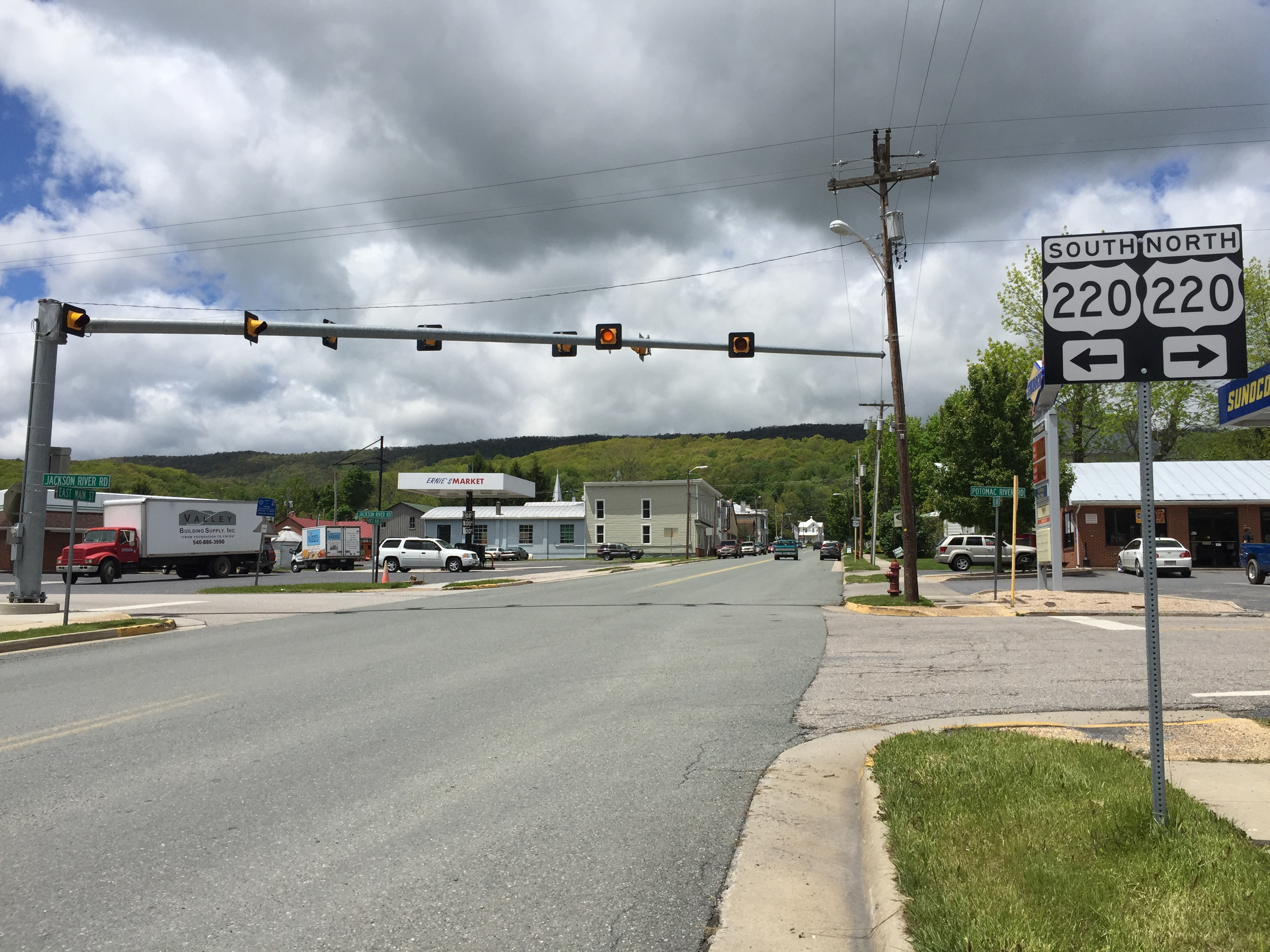
The junction of US 220 and US 250 in Monterey

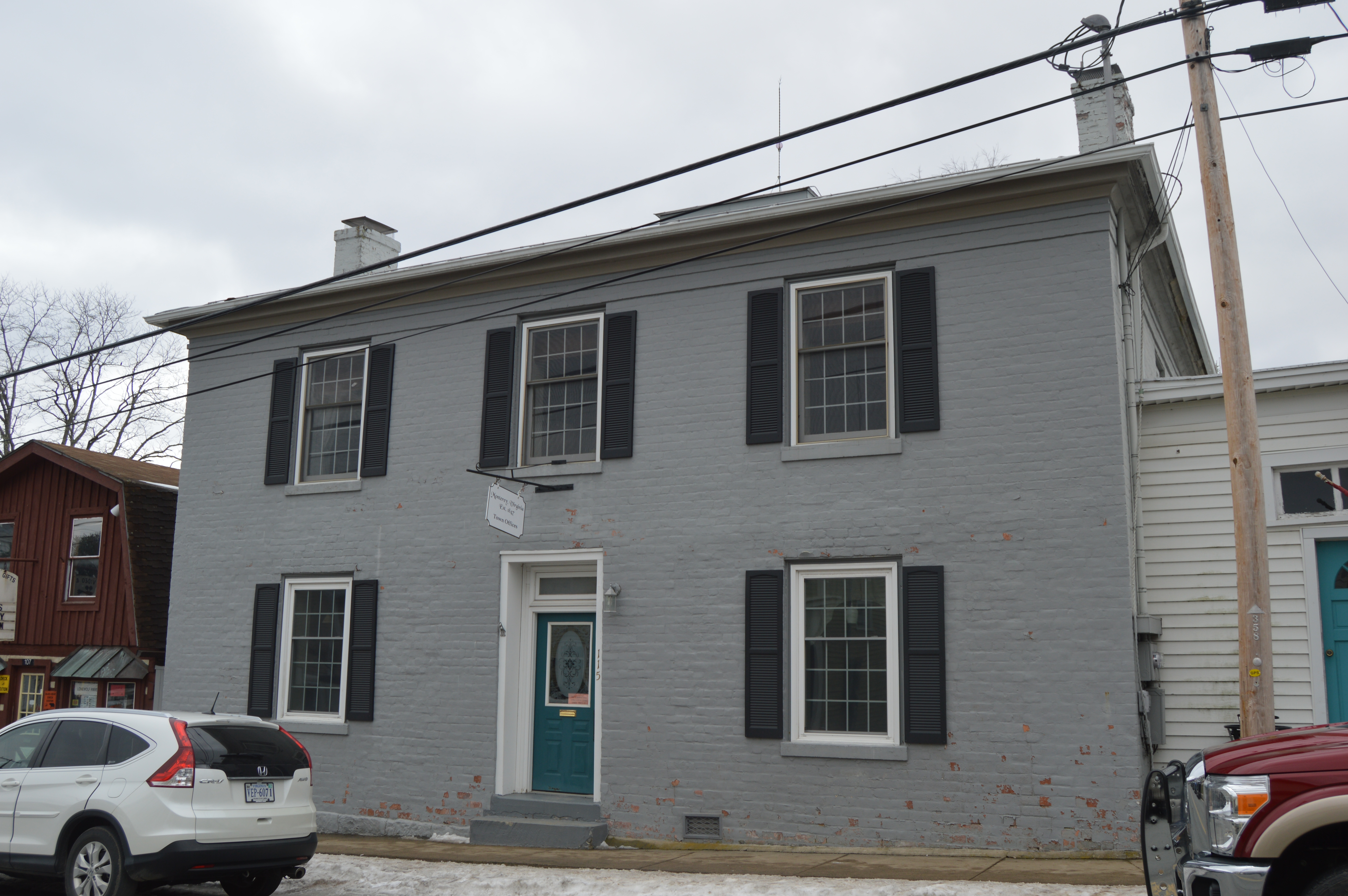
Monterey Town Hall

U.S. Route 220 and U.S. Route 250 are the main highways serving Monterey. US 220 is oriented northeast to southwest. To the southwest, the closest large city it passes through is Roanoke, while to the northeast, it is Cumberland, Maryland. US 250 extends northwest to southeast, and its destinations include Staunton to the southeast and Elkins to the northwest. US 250 was built through the area in the 1840s as a portion of the historic Staunton-Parkersburg Turnpike which linked the upper Shenandoah Valley with the Ohio River.

== Economy and tourism ==
The town of Monterey is heavily dependent on agriculture and on niche tourism generated from its many events and shops catering to tourists. The biggest festival is the Highland County Maple Festival, held on the second and third weekends of March, which brings roughly 50,000 visitors to the area.

== Demographics ==
Historical population
Census	Pop.	Note	%±
1880	154		—
1900	246		—
1910	240		−2.4%
1920	313		30.4%
1930	290		−7.3%
1940	309		6.6%
1950	262		−15.2%
1960	270		3.1%
1970	223		−17.4%
1980	247		10.8%
1990	222		−10.1%
2000	158		−28.8%
2010	147		−7.0%
2020	165		12.2%
U.S. Decennial Census

As of the 2010 census, there were 147 people, 79 households, and 46 families living in the town. The population density was 490 people per square mile (183.8/km^{2}). There were 121 housing units at an average density of 403.3 per square mile (151.25/km^{2}). The racial makeup of the town was 98.6% White, 0.7% Native American, and 0.7% Black or African American. Hispanic or Latino of any race were 0.7% of the population.

There were 79 households, out of which 20.3% had children under the age of 18 living with them, 44.3% were married couples living together, 12.7% had a female householder with no husband present, and 41.8% were non-families. 40.5% of all households were made up of individuals, and 16.5% had someone living alone who was 65 years of age or older. The average household size was 1.86 and the average family size was 2.37.

In the town, the population was spread out, with 14.3% under the age of 18, 4.7% from 18 to 24, 19.7% from 25 to 44, 33.4% from 45 to 64, and 27.9% who were 65 years of age or older. The median age was 51.5 years. For every 100 females, there were 81.5 males. For every 100 females aged 18 and over, there were 82.6 males.

The median income for a household in the town was $50,446, and the median income for a family was $64,792. Males had a median income of $41,250 versus $35,625 for females. The per capita income for the town was $31,673. 7.2% of the families and 16.5% of the population were living below the poverty line, including 20% of those under 18 and 14.3% of those over 64.

== Climate ==
The climate in this area has relatively large differences between highs and lows, and there is adequate rainfall year-round. Summers are generally warm, sometimes hot, and winters are relatively cold. According to the Köppen Climate Classification system, Monterey has a warm summer humid continental climate, abbreviated "Dfb" on climate maps.

Climate data for Monterey, Virginia (1981–2010)
Month	Jan	Feb	Mar	Apr	May	Jun	Jul	Aug	Sep	Oct	Nov	Dec	Year
Mean daily maximum °F (°C)	38.2 (3.4)	43.2 (6.2)	51.5 (10.8)	61.6 (16.4)	71.0 (21.7)	78.0 (25.6)	81.1 (27.3)	79.3 (26.3)	72.9 (22.7)	63.8 (17.7)	51.9 (11.1)	43.4 (6.3)	61.5 (16.4)
Mean daily minimum °F (°C)	17.8 (−7.9)	21.9 (−5.6)	28.1 (−2.2)	36.7 (2.6)	46.0 (7.8)	53.8 (12.1)	57.8 (14.3)	55.9 (13.3)	49.0 (9.4)	39.9 (4.4)	30.7 (−0.7)	23.8 (−4.6)	38.6 (3.7)
Average precipitation inches (mm)	2.60 (66)	3.07 (78)	3.41 (87)	4.09 (104)	4.44 (113)	3.89 (99)	4.02 (102)	3.71 (94)	2.94 (75)	3.69 (94)	4.16 (106)	3.43 (87)	43.46 (1,104)
Average snowfall inches (cm)	9.4 (24)	10.5 (27)	6.9 (18)	1.4 (3.6)	0.2 (0.51)	0 (0)	0 (0)	0 (0)	0 (0)	0.3 (0.76)	2.0 (5.1)	6.3 (16)	37 (94.97)
Source: Western Regional Climate Center
