= Protected group =

Demographic label

A protected group or protected class is a category by which people are qualified for special protection by a law, policy, or similar authority. Terminology varies by jurisdiction; such people may instead be referred to in relation to their protected characteristics, or by prohibited grounds for discrimination against them.

== Genocide Convention ==
The 1948 Genocide Convention defines genocide as any of five "acts committed with intent to destroy, in whole or in part, a national, ethnic, racial or religious group". Signatories of the convention are bound by the responsibility to protect doctrine to intervene in preventing the genocide of a protected group.

== Convention Relating to the Status of Refugees ==
The 1951 Convention Relating to the Status of Refugees enshrined the principle of non-refoulement in international law by prohibiting the expulsion of a refugee "to the frontiers of territories where his life or freedom would be threatened on account of his race, religion, nationality, membership of a particular social group or political opinion."

== Council of Europe ==
Article 14 of the European Convention on Human Rights states that discrimination is prohibited on "any ground" (French: sans distinction aucune), listing several examples. This protection was expanded by Protocol 12 to the European Convention on Human Rights which states that all law must also be applied without discrimination, and not just in housing, employment, and other areas covered by the Convention. This was first litigated in 2009 when the court found in Sejdić and Finci v. Bosnia and Herzegovina that constitutional rules around eligibility to run for office also must be non-discriminatory.

== North America ==
In Canada and the United States, the term is frequently used in connection with employees and employment and housing. Where illegal discrimination on the basis of protected group status is concerned, a single act of discrimination may be based on more than one protected class. For example, discrimination based on antisemitism may relate to religion, ethnicity, national origin, or any combination of the three; discrimination against a pregnant woman might be based on sex, marital status, or both. Exemptions to anti-discrimination laws include citizenship discrimination and religious exemptions.

=== Canada ===
"Prohibited grounds of discrimination" (French: motif de distinction illicite) in employment and housing are listed in the federal Canadian Human Rights Act as well as the provincial human rights codes. For examples the federal law lists: race, national or ethnic origin, colour, religion, age, sex, sexual orientation, gender identity or expression, marital status, family status, genetic characteristics, disability, and conviction for an offence for which a pardon has been granted or in respect of which a record suspension has been ordered.

=== United States ===
US federal law protects individuals from discrimination or harassment based on the following nine protected classes: sex (including sexual orientation and gender identity), race/color, age, disability, national origin, religion/creed, or genetic information (added in 2008). Many state laws also provide protection against harassment and discrimination based on these classes, as do many employer policies. Although it is not required by federal law, state law and employer policies may also protect employees from harassment or discrimination based on marital status. The following characteristics are "protected" by United States federal anti-discrimination law:

- Race – Civil Rights Act of 1964
- Religion – Civil Rights Act of 1964
- National origin – Civil Rights Act of 1964
- Age (40 and over) – Age Discrimination in Employment Act of 1967
- Sex – Equal Pay Act of 1963 and Civil Rights Act of 1964
  - Sexual orientation and gender identity as of Bostock v. Clayton County – Civil Rights Act of 1964
- Pregnancy – Pregnancy Discrimination Act
- Familial status – Civil Rights Act of 1968 Title VIII: Prohibits discrimination for having children, with an exception for senior housing. Also prohibits making a preference for those with children.
- Disability status – Rehabilitation Act of 1973 and Americans with Disabilities Act of 1990
- Veteran status – Vietnam Era Veterans' Readjustment Assistance Act of 1974 and Uniformed Services Employment and Reemployment Rights Act
- Genetic information – Genetic Information Nondiscrimination Act

Individual states can and do create other classes for protection under state law.

Presidents have also issued executive orders which prohibit consideration of particular attributes in employment decisions of the United States government and its contractors. These have included Executive Order 11246 (1965), Executive Order 11478 (1969), Executive Order 13087 (1998), Executive Order 13279 (2003), and Executive Order 13672 (2014).

Protected groups for the purposes of asylum in the United States are "race, religion, nationality, membership in a particular social group, or political opinion"

== See also ==
- Affirmative action
- Civil Rights Act of 1866
- Equal Employment Opportunity Commission
- Equality Act 2010
- Fair Housing Act
- Office of Fair Housing and Equal Opportunity
- Suspect classification, United States legal criteria for determining groups likely to be subject to unconstitutional discrimination
