= Bernice Sandler =

American women's rights activist (1928–2019)

- Sandler in June 1944
- Born: Bernice Resnick; March 3, 1928; New York City, U.S.
- Died: January 5, 2019 (aged 90); Washington, D.C., U.S.
- Education: Brooklyn College (BS); City College of New York (MS); University of Maryland (EdD)
- Known for: Title IX; Women's Rights; Gender Equality
- Political party: Democratic
- Spouse: Jerrold Sandler
- Children: 2

Bernice Resnick Sandler (March 3, 1928 – January 5, 2019) was an American women's rights activist. She is best known for being instrumental in the creation of Title IX, a portion of the Education Amendments of 1972, in conjunction with representatives Edith Green and Patsy Mink and Senator Birch Bayh in the 1970s. She has been called "the Godmother of Title IX" by The New York Times. Sandler wrote extensively about sexual and peer harassment towards women on campus, coining the phrase "the chilly campus climate".

She received numerous awards and honors for her work on women's rights and was inducted into the Maryland Women's Hall of Fame in 2010, and the National Women's Hall of Fame in 2013. Some of her papers are held in the Arthur and Elizabeth Schlesinger Library on the History of Women in America, at the Radcliffe Institute, Harvard University.

== Early life ==
Sandler was born Bernice Resnick on March 3, 1928, in Brooklyn, New York City. She was the second daughter of Ida Ernst Resnick and Abraham Hyman, Jewish immigrants from Russia and Germany who owned a women's clothing store in Rockaway, New Jersey. She was intended to be named Beryl by her parents, but a doctor's error led to Bernice being written on her birth certificate instead. The nickname "Bunny" is derived from a Yiddish translation of Bernice, Bunya.

After Sandler graduated from Erasmus Hall High School, she attended Brooklyn College where she graduated cum laude with a bachelor's of science in psychology 1948. Sandler also happened to attend "the city’s first public coeducational liberal arts college." At the time of its founding in 1930, Brooklyn College "was envisioned as a stepping stone for the sons and daughters of immigrants and working-class people toward a better life through a superb—and at the time, free—college education."

Furthering her education, she enrolled in the masters program at the City College of New York. Historically, City College had been seen as "the poor man's Harvard" and had only recently begun admitting women into its graduate programs. Sandler received a masters of clinical and school psychology in 1950. In 1951, the institution became coeducational. The following year, Resnick married Jerrold Sandler, an educational broadcaster who became champion for public radio funding, and had two children with him: Deborah Jo in 1954 and Emily Maud in 1956. The two divorced in 1978.

== Career and activism ==
Sandler worked a series of odd jobs as a research assistant, nursery school teacher, a guitar instructor, and as a secretary as a result of moving repeatedly with her husband. While she was living in Bloomington, Indiana, she began working as a research assistant in psychology at Indiana University but she was rejected from the graduate program, due to a quota surrounding women graduate students. The couple moved to Washington, D.C. in 1964, where she applied for a graduate degree at the University of Maryland but was rejected due to her age. She was eventually admitted after comparing her situation to that of a returning veteran. In 1969, she received her Ed.D. in counseling and personnel services, minoring in psychology and social work.

=== Activism with Women's Equity Action League ===
Immediately following the completion of her Ed.D., Sandler applied to a variety of teaching positions for which she was qualified, but was continually turned down for a variety of reasons. In one interview she was told, "she came on too strong for a woman." As a result of her frustration, she joined the Women's Equity Action League (WEAL) as the Chair of the Action Committee for Federal Contract Compliance from 1969 to 1971. The WEAL was an organization active from 1968 to 1989, which was primarily focused on utilizing legal action and lobbying to enhance the status of women across the country. The now defunct organization is best known for its work overseeing the implementation of, "the contract compliance executive order as it applied to sex discrimination."

In between her time as Chair of the Action Committee at WEAL she was also hired as an Education Specialist for the Special Subcommittee on Education, Committee on Education and Labor for the U.S. House of Representatives. It was during her time on the Special Subcommittee on Education that Sandler helped to support hearings that had a direct focus on sex discrimination within education and employment matters. In 1971, she became the deputy director of the Women's Action Program within the Department of Health’s Education and Welfare section. While at the Department of Health, Sandler worked on sex discrimination in education issues.

=== Godmother of Title IX ===
As a self-proclaimed "believer in bibliotherapy," Sandler turned to reading to help come to terms with the situation. While reading a report from the U.S. Commission on Civil Rights, she discovered an executive order that prohibited federal contractors from discrimination on a variety of factors that was recently amended to include sex discrimination. In 1965, President Lyndon B. Johnson signed Executive Order 11246, which was originally focused on, "equal employment opportunity in Government employment, employment by Federal contractors and subcontractors and employment under Federally assisted construction contracts regardless of race, creed, color or national origin." In 1967, Johnson amended the executive order through Executive Order 11375, which specifically added sex discrimination as a category protected by the previous Executive Order. This minor amendment by Johnson, paved the way forward for Sandler, providing her with the legal footing necessary to bring legal complaints against non-compliant higher education institutions.

Through this discovery, Sandler worked with the Director of the Office of Federal Contract Compliance at the Department of Labor, Vincent Macaluso, and through her position with the WEAL, she began to file class-action lawsuits against colleges and universities nationwide. Although the barrage of over 250 lawsuits against higher education institutions was successful in generating attention toward the issue, it did little to generate significant federal enforcement on the issues at hand. Prior to the lawsuits, the federal office in charge of overseeing enforcement of the executive order, the Office for Civil Rights under the Department of Health, Education, and Welfare, had been slow to implement an enforcement program and had generally failed to provide adequate protection for those affected. Concurrently during her nationwide legal campaign, Sandler continued to press women in academia to write their congressional representatives to increase awareness and exposure on the issue of sex discrimination in education that were directed at the Secretary of Labor.

Simultaneously, Representative Edith Green (D-OR) and Representative Patsy Mink (D-HI), both members of the House Committee on Education and Labor, were attempting to address the lack of legal coverage that was focused on sex discrimination within the education field. Using the data compiled by the WEAL, Sandler was able to provide Green and Mink with the material they needed to hold hearings on sex discrimination in education and to draft potential legislation addressing the issue. The hearings held in June 1970 by the committee were successful in generating a wealth of materials to be used in supporting an effort to end sex discrimination in higher education. Testimony during the hearing highlighted multiple perspectives brought forth by women within higher education who were discriminated against and had little assistance from the Office for Civil Rights within the Department of Health, Education, and Welfare.

On the Senate side, Senator Birch Bayh, (D-IN), a staunch advocate for the Equal Rights Amendment, sponsored the legislation and worked to ensure its passage following the instrumental work done by Green, Mink, and Sandler. With the legislation passing with little notice by the media and educational institutions, Title IX of the Education Amendments of 1972 was passed by the 92nd Congress and was signed into law by President Richard Nixon. It had a dramatic effect on the higher education field to include a significant effect on collegiate athletics. It served "as a means of correcting sex discrimination at the college and university level." In addition to ending sex discrimination in education, the act also extends to athletics, sexual harassment and employment discrimination. Title IX has had a significant impact on female collegiate athletics throughout its 46-year history, dramatically increasing the number of women in college athletics, increasing minority representation and increasing overall equity and diversity within the NCAA. For her significant work on formulating and then executing a plan to address sex discrimination within higher education, Sandler has been described by many as "the Godmother of Title IX."

=== Later work ===
After the passage of the landmark legislation, Sandler continued to address women's rights issues nationwide. Her work on women's rights issues led to many 'firsts' in the field that continue to affect women nationwide. After a brief stint in the federal government, Sandler helped found the Project on the Status and Education of Women (PSEW) in 1971. The PSEW was an organization that focused on sexual equality issues within the education system. While serving as Director and later Executive Associate with the PSEW, Sandler was instrumental in shaping the organization's direction during her time there from 1971 through 1991. She led the creation of a monthly newsletter, On Campus with Women, to provide higher education administrators with the information needed to better understand the developments affecting women within higher education.

During her time at PSEW, Sandler also served in various capacities on the National Advisory Council on Women's Educational Programs. She was appointed to the council by both Presidents Gerald Ford and Jimmy Carter. Sandler served on the council from 1975 through 1982 and was Council Chair during her initial appointment from 1975 to 1977. In 1977, Sandler became an associate of the Women's Institute for Freedom of the Press (WIFP). WIFP is an American nonprofit publishing organization. The organization works to increase communication between women and connect the public with forms of women-based media.

In 1982, co-authoring a report with Roberta M. Hall, the two first created the term "chilly climate," which they defined as "an environment that dampens women's self-esteem, confidence, aspirations and their participation." Sandler also maintains a long list of 'firsts' within the field. A sample of her many 'firsts' include, "the first individual to write the first federal policy report on sex discrimination in education, the first paper about barriers faced by women of color and from other special population groups, the first report on campus gang rape and the first report on peer harassment."

Throughout the 1990s and beyond, Sandler continued to serve as an expert witness in both discrimination and sexual harassment cases. From 1991 to 1994, she was a Senior Associate at the Center for Women's Policy Studies, a non-profit organization that focuses on a diverse range of issues affecting women, including addiction issues and recovery efforts. She was a senior fellow at the Women's Research & Education Institute where she focused on sexual harassment, the chilly classroom climate, and women's issues on campus. The Women's Research & Education Institute, founded in 1977, is a nonpartisan, non-profit, independent organization that works to, "identify issues affecting women in their roles in the family, workplace and public arena and to inform and help shape public policy."

== Legacy ==
Sandler and her role in implementing Title IX is highlighted in the documentary film Rise of the Wahine (2014), directed by Dean Kaneshiro. Rise of the Wahine highlights the individuals from Hawaii who were influential in changing women's collegiate athletic opportunities. Her work is also promoted in the 2015 documentary, An Unexpected Win: Title IX and the Pinckney Pirates, a documentary about the effect of Title IX in a Midwest town. Sandler also appeared on the TV series, Penn & Teller: Bullshit!, on an episode about Title IX.

As of 2013, Sandler was the recipient of over a dozen honorary doctorates for her work on women's issues.

== Awards and honors ==
- Athena Award, Intercollegiate Association of Women Students, 1974
- Boyer Award, Women's Equity Action League, 1976
- National Leadership Award, Institute for Educational Leadership, 1979
- co-Winner Rockefeller Public Service Award, Princeton University, 1976
- Anna Roe Award, Harvard University, 1988
- Georgina Smith Award
- American Association of University Professors 1991
- Woman of Distinction Award, National Association for Women in Education 1991
- Woman of Achievement, Turner Broadcasting System, 1994
- Leadership Matters Award, Institute for Educational Leadership, 1997
- Foremothers Lifetime Achievement Award, National Center for Health Research, 2007
- American Psychological Association Presidential Citation, 2012
- National Women's Hall of Fame, Inductee, 2013

== Books ==
- Sandler, Bernice R., Lisa A. Silverberg and Roberta M. Hall, The Chilly Classroom Climate: A Guide to Improve the Education of Women, Washington, DC: National Association for Women in Education, 1996.
- Co-editor, with Robert J. Shoop, Sexual Harassment on Campus: A Guide for Administrators, Faculty and Students. Boston: Allyn and Bacon, 1997.
- Educator's Guide to Controlling Sexual Harassment, Thompson Publishing Co., Washington, DC, 1993.
