= Gender representation on corporate boards of directors =

Aspect of culture

Gender representation on corporate boards of directors refers to the proportion of men and women who occupy board member positions. To measure gender diversity on corporate boards, studies often use the percentage of women holding corporate board seats and the percentage of companies with at least one woman on their board. Globally, men occupy more board seats than women. As of 2018, women held 20.8% of the board seats on Russell 1000 companies (up from 17.9% in 2015). Most percentages for gender representation on corporate boards refer only to public company boards. Private companies are not required to disclose information on their board of directors, so the data is less available.

The reasons behind the disproportionate gender ratio of directors is a subject of much debate. A survey of more than 4000 directors found that male directors over the age of 55 cited a lack of qualified female candidates as the main reason behind the stagnant number of female directors. In contrast, in the same study, female directors and younger male directors considered the male-dominated networking that often led to the appointment of directors to be the reason behind women's slow progress.

Given that gender diversity on boards is an issue rooted in the principle of equality of treatment, inequality in gender representation on boards can be combated through equality of opportunity reforms, equality of outcome reforms, or by spreading information on gender bias. Governments and corporations have attempted to address the disproportionality of gender representation on corporate boards through both types of reform measures, including legislation mandating gender quotas (a reform based on the principle of equality of outcome) and comply or explain guidelines (a reform based on the principle of equality of opportunity).

== History ==
The Lettie Pate Whitehead Foundation asserts that Lettie Pate Whitehead was one of the first female directors of a prominent company. She was a member of the board of the Coca-Cola Company from 1934. A survey of Fortune 250 companies in 2012, however, found the first female director of the surveyed companies to be Clara Abbott, a director of Abbott Laboratories from 1900. The survey also found that the average first year of appointing a company's first female director was 1985. In 2001, Sarah Hogg, Viscountess Hailsham, became the first woman to chair a FTSE 100 company.

Katharine Graham, previously the chairwoman of the board of The Post Co., was the first female Fortune 500 CEO in 1972. Ursula Burns, the chairman and CEO of Xerox, was the first African American female CEO of a Fortune 500 company.

== Rationale behind gender diversity on corporate boards ==
The desire to achieve proportionate gender representation on corporate boards is derived from the principle of equality of treatment. Equality of treatment requires comparable situations to be treated in the same manner and prohibits direct and indirect discrimination. Equality of treatment refers to either equality of opportunity or equality of outcome. Equality of opportunity requires providing everyone with the same opportunity to attain what they desire. Equality of outcome requires every individual to possess an equal share of outcomes such as goods or positions.

The Convention on the Elimination of all Forms of Discrimination Against Women requires states that have ratified the convention to guarantee the exercise of human rights and fundamental freedoms to women on an equal basis to men. Further, achieving gender equality, including in economic decision-making processes, is one of the United Nations' Sustainable Development Goals.

Many countries have also opted to pursue this principle through their constitution or through various forms of legislation. For example, the Canadian Charter of Rights and Freedoms which guarantees equality rights, including gender equality, and the Equality Act 2010 in the United Kingdom which protects against discrimination based on sex. In the United States, Title VII of the Civil Rights Act of 1964 prohibits discrimination against employees on the basis of sex.

== Determinants of gender diversity on corporate boards ==
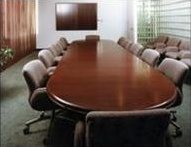
Boardroom

A number of studies have been conducted to determine the type of companies that are more likely to have female directors on their boards. A study on Spanish small and medium-sized enterprises found that firm performance increases the probability of having a female director. The same study also found that higher corporate ownership and firm risk led to a lower probability of having a female presence on a company's board. A survey of UK companies found larger companies to be more likely to have a higher proportion of female directors. The findings regarding firm size and corporate risk are consistent with a study conducted on 1002 companies across Brazil, Russia, India, China, the UK and USA. Masayuki Morikawa conducted a study that focused on Japanese companies and found that the probability of having a female director increased for companies that are managed by the owners of the companies, but decreased for public companies and older companies.

== Impact ==
Numerous studies have been undertaken on the effects of gender diversity on company boards with mixed results. In exploring the relationship between female directors and firm performance, Corinne Post and Kris Byron argue that differences in cognitive functions and values between the genders should influence firm performance and a board's decision-making process. An academic article produced by Nguyen, et al., suggests that numerous studies have found improvements in firm performance influenced by female staff members on corporate boards. Females bring a number of “social, managerial, and leadership qualities,” (Nguyen, et al.) to the table that directly influence corporate governance practices, such as ethics, trustworthiness, and risk taking/aversions. Another study by Nada K. Kakabadse et al. suggest that a diverse board will expand the board access to resources and networks, either from the directors' personal connections or simply by being a symbol through their position as a female director. The theory that gender diversity on corporate boards is of value is further strengthened by a study of 127 Malaysian firms that found stock markets react in a positive manner to the appointment of female directors. An analysis of the effects of greater female representation in the boards of directors of Iraqi companies by Farhan and Nayan found a "positive and significant" relationship between female directors and firm performance, as measured by return on assets. The study's authors stated that the important policy implication of their findings is that companies on the Iraqi stock exchange and security commission should incorporate gender diversity in their corporate governance practices.

The study by Corinne Post and Kris Byron using results from 140 studies found that the presence of female directors on a corporate board has a positive correlation with accounting returns and monitoring and strategizing tasks. However, the study concluded that there is no significant relationship between female directors and market performance, possibly due to a variations in the female director/firm performance relationship between countries with different levels of gender equality. The relationship was found to be positive in those with more gender equality and negative in those with less gender equality. A study on nonfinancial Spanish small and medium-sized enterprises found a positive relationship between female directors and firm performance using return of assets as a measure of firm performance. Further, a survey of 6500 company boards revealed that an increase in participation by female directors reduces the firm's chances of becoming embroiled in corporate governance issues. A study of S&P 1500 companies by Maurice Levi, Kai Li and Feng Zhang found companies with female directors to be less likely to acquire other companies and to pay less bid premium if an acquisition occurs.

Another study, conducted by Gennaro Bernile, Vineet Bhagwat, and Scott Yonker in 2017, found that "board diversity [was] associated with lower realized firm risk." The study further noted that "both operating performance and asset valuation multiples increase with board diversity." In addition, firms with more diverse boards tended to pay higher dividends, pursue less risky financial policies, and invest more in research and development. The findings of this study were not exclusively positive, however. The study authors found that greater diversity was not always beneficial to firm performance when overall volatility was high. They posited that because diverse boards can endure longer decision-making processes, they can fail to respond rapidly when a quick decision is necessary.

Other studies have found no evidence of a positive relationship between gender diversity and firm performance. A study by Ian Gregory-Smith, Brian G.M. Main and Charles A. O'Reilly III on companies listed on the FTSE 350 found no significant relationship between having a female director and company performance as measured by shareholder return, return on assets, return on equity and price to book ratio. In an interview with 45 corporate insiders, Lissa Broome, John Conley and Kimberly Krawiec found that insiders have difficulty with isolating the particular manner in which female directors contribute solely on the basis of their gender. Further, in the context of emerging economies, the study on Malaysian firms found gender diversity to have a negative effect on firm value in government owned companies, suggesting that the relationship between female directors and firm value might vary across company types.

Another study on 30 companies with female directors in the United Kingdom, United States and Ghana found that having a minority female board representation does not affect board performance. This is in line with previous research based on 50 female directors that concluded at least 3 female directors is required to improve a company's corporate governance.

According to a 2019 study in The Review of Economic Studies, Norway's gender quota "had very little discernible impact on women in business beyond its direct effect on the women who made it into boardrooms." According to a 2019 study in the journal Electoral Studies, Norway's adoption of the gender quota did not have a spillover on politics. It did not lead to greater political representation among women. A 2025 study found that among nine European countries that adopted gender quotas on corporate boards over the period 2005-2021, "the female share of nonexecutive directors increased by 20 percentage points within 6 years after a quotas' adoption" but "women's representation among CEOs or other senior executives hardly changed."

== Current landscape ==
=== Percentage of women holding corporate board seats ===
As of March 2018, 27.1% of board seats of companies on the Australian S&P/ASX 200 index are held by women.

In Hong Kong and India women hold 10.2% and 9.5% of board seats of the Hang Seng Index and BSE 200 index respectively. Women in Japan hold 3.1% of board seats on companies in the TOPIX Core 30 Index.

The proportion of board seats held by women in Europe varies significantly. In the Scandinavian countries, Norway leads the way with 35.5% of board seats of the companies in the OBX index held by women. Finland is in second place with women holding 29.9% of board seats on the companies in the OMX Helsinki 25 index. In Sweden, 28.8% of board seats of the companies in the OMX Stockholm 30 index are held by women. Women also hold 21.9% of board seats of the companies on the OMX Copenhagen 20 index in Denmark. In France and Germany, women hold 29.7% and 18.5% of board seats of companies on the CAC 40 index and the DAX index respectively. In the United Kingdom, among the companies in the FTSE 100 index, women hold 22.8% of board seats. At the other end of the scale, women hold only 10.3% of board seats in Ireland and 7.9% in Portugal.

In Canada women hold 20.8% of board seats on companies in the S&P/TSX 60 index. In the United States of America, women hold 19.2% of board seats on companies in the S&P 500.

In Latin America only 6.4% of board seats of the 100 largest companies in the region are held by women. Colombia has the highest percentage of female board seats in Latin America with 13.4%. Brazil has the second highest with 6.3%. Chile shows a percentage of female on board equal to 7%.

In Africa, a survey of 307 listed companies across 12 African nations found that women hold 12.7% of board seats. Kenya has the largest female board representation of 19.8%, South Africa has 17.4% and Botswana has 16.9%. On the other end, Côte d'Ivoire has the lowest female board representation of 5.1%.

Although women hold 17.9% of the board seats on Fortune 1000 companies, female board representation varies between industry sectors. In Germany women consisted of 8% of executive board members of the largest banks in Germany, despite holding 18.5% of board seats across industries.

=== Percentage of companies with at least one female director ===
As of August 2015, 2% of S&P 500 companies had all male boards of directors. This is a marked improvement from 2005, when 12% of S&P companies had all male boards of directors. All FTSE 100 firms have female directors.

The 2014 Catalyst Census found that 26.2% of S&P 500 companies had 24% or more female directors. In Canada, 36.7% of S&P/TSX60 Companies has 25% or more female directors.

53 of the 100 largest companies in Latin America have at least one female director. In Africa, 67.1% of 307 listed companies across 12 African nations surveyed had at least 1 female director. 33.6% of the companies only have 1 female director.

=== Percentage of companies with gender equitable boards ===
According to The SHE Mark's SHEgoverns Awards 2023: Women on Boards Report, as of February 2023, 8.8% of the S&P Global had gender equitable boards (with at least 50% women's representation). Most of the companies are in the Financials sector.

The S&P Europe 350 had the most companies with gender equitable boards, totaling 69, or 19.7% of the index. Some of the more recognizable companies in that group are Vodafone, Hermès, Diageo, H&M, Auto Trader, BNP Paribas, Pernod Ricard, Shell, SAP, and Heineken. France had the highest number of gender equitable boards, amounting to 20. The UK was next with 12, followed by Germany and the Netherlands with 7.

4% of the S&P 500 had at least 50% women on the board, accounting for 20 of the 500 companies on the index. Some of the more recognizable companies are Citigroup, Coca-Cola, General Mills, Hasbro, Match Group, Omnicom, Paramount Global, Progressive, TJX, Ulta Beauty, Walgreens Boots Alliance, and Walt Disney.

The S&P/ASX 50 had 8 companies with gender equitable boards, or 16% of the index. Some of the recognizable companies are Auckland International Airport, Commonwealth Bank, and Woolworths.

The S&P/TSX 60 had 6 companies with gender equitable boards, or 10% of the overall index. Some of the recognizable companies include Canadian National Railway Co., National Bank of Canada, Saputo Inc., and Sun Life Financial, Inc.

The S&P Latin American 40 had 2 companies with gender equitable boards, or 5% of the overall index. Those two companies, Banco Do Brasil and PagSeguro Digital Ltd., are both in Brazil and in the financials sector.

The S&P/TOPIX 150 only had 1 company (0.7% of the index) with gender equality on the board: Nidec Corp. Across the index, the average representation was 1 woman out of 10.

The S&P Asia 50 had 0 companies with gender equitable boards. The closest any company came was 40% women's representation.

== Encouraging gender diversity on corporate boards ==
=== Gender quotas ===
One approach taken by governments to achieve gender equality on corporate boards has been to enact legislation requiring a set quota of female representation on corporate boards. The quota system typifies an equality of outcome approach, which is concerned with the result rather than the means of achieving such a result. Belgium, France, Germany, Iceland, India, Israel, Italy, Norway, the UAE and Pakistan and Spain currently have legislated quotas for women on corporate boards of publicly listed companies. A study on 10 countries with gender quotas and 15 countries with comply and explain systems found that countries that adopt gender quotas tend to have several pre-conditions: female labor market and gendered welfare state provisions, left-leaning political government coalitions, and path dependent policy initiatives for gender equality, both in the public realm as well as in the corporate domain.

==== Asia Pacific ====
In India, the Companies Act, 2013 imposes a quota of at least one female director on the board of listed companies and any public unlisted company having a paid-up share capital of 100 crore or more rupees($14m) or a turnover of 300 crore or more rupees($42m).

In Australia, the ASX Corporate Governance Council announced proposed amendments to its guidelines to include a 30% quota in April 2018. Compliance is enforced only on a 'if not, why not' basis. In 2015, the Australian Institute of Company Directors had introduced the same quota as a recommendation.

In Pakistan, the Corporate Governance Code implemented under the Companies Act of 2017 imposes a requirement on all public interest companies to have at least one woman director within three years.

==== Europe ====
In 2006, the Norwegian government introduced quota legislation that required both public and state owned companies to have 40% female board representation by 2008. Failure to comply resulted in fines or company closures. Full compliance was achieved by 2009. The percentage of female board members has since remained between 36% and 40%. Iceland and Spain have introduced legislation requiring 40% of female board representation on publicly traded companies. Finland requires 40% of state owned enterprises to have female directors for 40% of their board seats. The Netherlands requires public companies with more than 250 employees to have female directors for 30% of the board seats.

In France, a bill was passed in 2011 requiring 40% female directorship by 2016. This quota is to be implemented on two schedules, one for private companies and one for public companies. Public companies will require 20% female board representation within three years, and 40% within six years. Private companies will have nine years to reach the 40% quota. Failure to comply with these schedules will result in voided nominations and suspended remuneration of board members.

Italy requires public companies to have 33% of either underrepresented gender.

Belgium passed a law requiring 33% female directorship by 2018. Failure to comply with these schedules will result in voided nominations and suspended remuneration of board members.

==== Middle East ====
In 1999, Israel legislated a gender quota requiring one female board director for publicly traded companies. In 2021, the United Arab Emirates made it law for each locally listed company to put at least one woman on their board of directors. Regulator the Emirates Securities and Commodities Authority (ESCA), had previously set a 'comply or explain' target for 20 percent female representation on their boards. The move is “in the context of keenness to empower Emirati women and encourage them to play a greater role in the boards of directors of listed companies,” ESCA said in a statement.

==== North America ====
Quebec's Bill 53, passed in 2006, is the only provincial legislation currently in effect in Canada that deals with gender representation on corporate boards. This bill requires an equal number of men and woman on the boards of Crown corporations.

California passed Senate Bill 826 in October 2018, mandating gender diversity on the boards of public companies headquartered in California. The bill set deadlines in 2019 (for two women on five-person boards) and 2021 (for three women on seven-person boards). It was challenged as unconstitutional on the grounds of violating equal protection. The District Court ruled the challengers did not have standing, but was overturned by the Ninth Circuit Court of Appeals. The District Court then denied a preliminary injunction. It is now pending another appeal. A separate lawsuit found the law unconstitutional on May 13, 2022.

In 2020, California passed Assembly Bill 979, requiring publicly held companies headquartered in California to include board members from underrepresented communities. The law requires at least one director from an underrepresented community by the end of 2021, and up to three, depending on board size, by the end of 2022. The term "underrepresented community" is defined as "an individual who self‑identifies as Black, African American, Hispanic, Latino, Asian, Pacific Islander, Native American, Native Hawaiian, or Alaska Native, or who self‑identifies as gay, lesbian, bisexual, or transgender." The law was ruled unconstitutional on April 1, 2022.

In August 2021, the US Securities and Exchange Commission (SEC) approved Nasdaq's proposed rules requiring listed companies to ensure women and minority directors were on their boards or provide an explanation of why they were not. In December 2024, the US Court of Appeals for the Fifth Circuit held in Alliance for Fair Board Recruitment v. SEC that the SEC lacked the authority to approve these rules.

==== Impact and criticism of gender quotas ====
The use of gender quotas as a mean of rectifying disproportionate gender representation on corporate boards has been controversial.

Many studies have found gender quotas to be beneficial, including through its positive impact on the appointment of a female board chair and a female CEO. A 2016 study of more than 21,000 companies in 91 countries showed that firms with at least 30% women in the c-suite are more profitable. An earlier report discovered that Fortune-500 companies with the most female directors reported greater return on sales and equity. Other studies show that female directors enhance the effectiveness of boards at governing. Women have better attendance, and their presence improves the attendance of men. Female directors are also more apt to serve on monitoring committees and more likely to hold CEO's accountable for poor financial returns. Female directors, too, tend to ensure that corporations are more environmentally responsible. Three or more women directors also correlates with employee productivity, higher dividend payouts, and a greater diversity of ideas.

Yet other studies advance negative outcomes. Some argue that quotas inadequately address the larger structural issue known as the glass ceiling. A working paper on the female labor market in Norway found that although a mandated quota led to an increase in female directors, it did not affect female employees of lower positions.

Board members are typically appointed in one of two ways: (1) internally, through in-firm appointments of high level executives such as CEOs; and (2) externally, through appointments made from outside of the firm. Quota systems simply affect gender representation of the board and might not affect the number of women who reach the internal pool from which candidates are appointed. So even if there is greater gender diversity on a corporate board, the pool from which candidates are chosen remain disproportionately occupied by men.

For example, Norway's quota system has significantly increased the number of women on corporate boards. However, the quota may not have altered the way women progress through organizations. In 2013, Norway's public companies had 41% female board representation but women made up only 5.8% of general managers at the public companies. In the same year, at the CEO level, only 6% of listed companies in Norway had a female CEO.

Nevertheless, the disparity between internal and external appointments to corporate boards also arises in jurisdictions that have not instituted a quota system. For example, in 2013, 48% of the female executive directors in the United Kingdom were internally promoted, compared to 62% for males.

=== Corporate governance codes ===
Another approach to addressing the disproportionality on corporate boards has been the adoption of the "comply or explain" governance system by Governments and organizations such as stock exchanges. This system requires companies to address the issue of proportionate gender representation with regards to board and executive appointments in their company filings and other reports and to explain the reason for any failure to comply with particular gender guidelines issued by the organization. The "comply or explain" system exemplifies equality of opportunity, an approach to equality whereby all people should be treated similarly, regardless of prejudices, preferences, or historical disadvantages, unless particular distinctions can be justified.

Fifteen countries have inserted requirements to report gender diversity board composition in their corporate governance codes.

==== Asia Pacific ====
In Australia, the Australian Securities Exchange adopted diversity reporting guidelines in 2010. The percentage of women on boards of ASX 200 companies in Australia has increased from 11% to 20% from 2010 to 2015.

==== Europe ====
In the United Kingdom, the UK Corporate Governance Code contains a mandatory "comply or explain" measure designed to address the disproportional representation on corporate boards. The UK Corporate Governance Code allows corporate boards to implement their own gender diversity policies and explicitly requires merit to be a consideration in candidate selection. The UK Government has commissioned two five year reviews, the Davies Review (2011) and the Hampton-Alexander Review (2016) to set recommendations and voluntary targets for FTSE350 listed companies to increase the number of women on public company boards. Further, companies are required to provide details of their boardroom gender diversity policy and procedures for appointing executives and managers, and to provide explanations for discrepancies with the targets listed in the guidelines.

In Sweden, the Swedish Annual Accounts Act requires companies to disclose information on the gender proportionality their managers in the companies' annual reports.

In Finland, a "comply or explain" system requires both genders to be represented on corporate boards, and to describe and justify any failures to meet such gender representation. Following the introduction of this system and Finland's gender quota, female board representation increased from 12% to 29%. In 2012, the Finland Chamber of Commerce implemented a mentoring program for women in mid to high-level managerial positions as a supplement to their current approach.

==== North America ====
In December 2014, the Ontario Securities Commission introduced comply-and-explain rules with regards to the percentage of female directors.

=== Pressure by institutional investors ===
==== United Kingdom ====
Institutional Investor Glass Lewis released guidelines related to gender diversity on corporate boards in 2016. The most recent guidelines state that FTSE 350 companies must have 33% female board representation by 2020. The method of enforcement laid out is that Glass Lewis "may recommend voting against the nominating committee chair."

==== United States ====
BlackRock added board diversity guidelines in 2017. BlackRock's 2020 Proxy paper encourages "companies to have at least two women directors on their board." In the event that BlackRock determines a company is not sufficiently committed to board diversity, Blackrock may recommend voting against the nominating/governance committee."

Glass Lewis' US benchmarks were first released in 2017. The most recent proxy paper mandates that boards have at least one female director and "will generally recommend voting against the nominating committee chair of a board that has no female members."

ISS added board diversity guidelines in 2018, stipulating that U.S. boards should have at least one female director. In the guidelines released for 2020, ISS recommended to "vote against or withhold from the chair of the nominating committee at companies where there are no women on the company's board." This advice was relevant to companies on either the Russell 3000 or the S&P 1500 indices.

=== Other responses and pending responses ===
==== Asia Pacific ====
In 2013, Shinzo Abe, the Prime Minister of Japan announced his intention to facilitate a great increase in female directors in Japan in a commentary in the Wall Street Journal.

==== Europe ====
In 2012, the European Commission introduced a proposal requiring companies in the EU member states to have 40% non executive female directors. For the time being the proposal (which was introduced by Viviane Reding) has been shelved, although discussions for such a proposal (or a similar one) remain open.

==== Latin America ====
In Latin America, the Brazilian Government has proposed a quota for female directors on state owned enterprises. The bill requires boards to eventually have a minimum of 40% of female directors.

==== North America ====
In Canada, two bills have been introduced that would require 40% of female board directors. Bill S-217 imposes a 40% quota for female board members of public companies and other regulated entities such as banks and insurance companies. Bill-C473 will balance the gender proportionality of directors serving on boards of state corporations by establishing minimum participant requirements by gender.

In the United States, the Nasdaq stock exchange filed with the SEC to adopt new listing rules mandating board diversity. If successful, Nasdaq-listed companies would be required to publicly disclose diversity statistics for their board of directors. They would also have to have at least one director who identifies as female and one director who identifies as "Black or African American, Hispanic or Latinx, Asian, Native American or Alaska Native, Native Hawaiian or Pacific Islander, two or more races or ethnicities, or as LGBTQ+." The SEC approved the Nasdaq proposed rules in August 2021. In December 2024, the US Court of Appeals for the Fifth Circuit held in Alliance for Fair Board Recruitment v. SEC that the SEC lacked the authority to approve these rules.

== The gender pay gap on corporate boards ==
The gender pay gap refers to the differences between the average pay received by all men compared to the average pay received by all women (Does not account for men and women working in differing industries). A number of studies, including a study on top managers of listed UK companies and one on companies listed on the Madrid Stock Exchange, have concluded that a gender pay gap exists between male and female directors. Philipp Geiler and Luc Renneboog found that female executive directors of listed UK companies earn 23% less than their male counterparts. A study by Gregory-Smith, Main and O'Reilly III on FTSE350 companies, however, found no evidence of such a discrepancy once the director's traits (including age and tenure) and other company features such as firm size and price to book ratio are taken into account.

The director gender pay gap appears to be dependent on several factors, including whether the company is in a male dominated industry and whether the female director is married or has children. Other factors include experience, the ability to negotiate pay, willingness to travel, the expectation of overtime worked (Men are 3 times more likely to work overtime). Other relevant factors found by Maria Consuelo Pucheta-Martinez and Inmaculada Bel-Oms include whether the Compensation Committee contains female members and the size of the companies. Another study by Marianne Bertrand et al. concluded that the gender quota in Norway reduced the gender gap on boards. However, as some researchers have cautioned, the small dataset from which such data from which the studies have been conducted should be considered in interpreting such results.

== Controversies ==
Protests in the United States in 2020 have ignited controversy that progress on board diversity has advanced significantly faster for white women than for racial minorities. In data from 2019, Institutional Shareholder Services (ISS) observed that black directors accounted for only 4.1% of board directors in the Russell 3000 index, up .5% since 2008. In contrast, 20% of directors in the Russell 3000 were women, doubling from 10% in 2008. A 2020 report revealed that in the wake of California's adoption of SB 826, mandating gender diversity on boards, 511 board seats were filled by women. 77.9% of those seats were filled by white women, 11.5% by Asian women, 5.3% by African American women, and 3.3% by Latina women.

Companies in the UK are facing similar scrutiny. A 2019 analysis of FTSE board directors found that 100% of female board directors in the FTSE 100 were white, as were 97% of female directors in the FTSE 250.

== Female Chief Executive Officers ==
Similar to the disproportionate gender representation on corporate boards, there is a lack of gender diversity amongst Chief Executive Officers (CEO). As of February 2016, only 4% of CEOs of S&P 500 companies were female. As of 2019 that had increased to 5% (25 in total). In 2020, several major companies appointed Women CEOs, including Citigroup, Clorox, CVS, Dick's Sporting Goods, and UPS. At the start of 2021, women held 7.8% of CEO positions in the Fortune 500.

A study on Norwegian companies following the introduction of a gender quota for female directors found that the increase in female directors had a positive correlation with the appointment of a female board chair and a female CEO. Unlike directors, there does not appear to be a gender pay gap between male and female CEOs.

== See also ==
- Board of directors
- UK labour law
- Worker representation on corporate boards of directors
- Chief Executive Officer
- Women in business
- Female entrepreneur
- Glass ceiling
- Gender pay gap
- Economic inequality
- Gender inequality
- Convention on the Elimination of All Forms of Discrimination Against Women
