= People accounting hypothesis =

Social psychological theory

Within the fields of equality, diversity, and inclusion, the people accounting hypothesis is a social psychological theory based on social categorization. It is defined as "a hypothesis that describes how a simple numerical imbalance in representation along nominal social category lines can affect people’s choice of candidates in highly competitive situations (e.g., awards, jobs, etc.)".

== Definition ==
The people accounting hypothesis can be derived from connecting social categorization, fairness, and choice pieces of literature. When a numerical imbalance between social categories is recognized by individuals, the "social categorization and fairness literature clearly suggests that the concern for fairness shifts from the interpersonal to the intergroup level, prompting individuals to correct an imbalance by promoting equality between groups".

Another characteristic of the people accounting hypothesis is that while it can be caused by many different nominal social category lines, in the end, it is "more likely to be triggered on a meaningful social category dimension versus a less meaningful one". It should also be stressed that the significance of a social category line is "context-specific".

Furthermore, there are implications of the people accounting hypothesis toward the affirmative action policy discussion. Observers note that "people accounting explains a much broader aversion to imbalance across social category lines" than affirmative action programs that try to promote diversity and overcome past inequalities By examining the people accounting hypothesis, they want to address a far broader phenomenon than the "narrow policy of affirmative action" and examine its tendency towards equality that goes beyond race and gender.

Further, the people accounting hypothesis only works under two conditions: It requires an objective perspective of third parties and the acknowledgment of an imbalance along gender lines. If third parties do not recognize a numerical imbalance between social categories – be it on purpose or not – or "are partial to one category in the dispute, people accounting will not take place", whilst cautioning that "there are undoubtedly individual differences in what people perceive as an imbalance".

Also, the assumption of an impartial, objective assessment of third-party observers should be questioned. It is difficult to find third-party observers with a totally impartial perspective. Since every person acts in a certain context and has his own background and interconnections with other people, there is no such thing as an impartial third-party observer.

== Empirical analyses ==
Garcia and Ybarra conducted a series of empirical studies where they tested the people accounting hypothesis. Based on these findings, the focus of their analysis was that if there is an alleged imbalance along social category lines, then not everybody will have equal opportunities in the workplace. Garcia and his colleagues conclude that "to the extent that a social category is overrepresented, the winning chances for a member from an over-represented category will drop at the discretion of impartial third parties". This process is explained by the fact that impartial third-party observers are reluctant to create inequalities along social category lines, and therefore feel pressure to categorically deny the overrepresented social category equal opportunity.

Garcia et al. also critically observe that "people accounting does not always result in the final selection of members of underrepresented social category groups". There are many other possible reasons why not everyone will have the same opportunity in the workplace (e.g., ingroup favoritism). Garcia and his colleagues focus on the perspective of impartial third-party observers and the psychological aspects of social categorization.
