= Executive Order 13672 =

2014 United States executive order

- Further Amendments to Executive Order 11478, Equal Employment Opportunity in the Federal Government, and Executive Order 11246, Equal Employment Opportunity
- Number: 13672
- President: Barack Obama
- Signed: July 21, 2014

Federal Register details
- Federal Register document number: 2014-17522
- Publication date: July 23, 2014

Repealed by
- Executive Order 14173, "Ending Illegal Discrimination And Restoring Merit-Based Opportunity, Крај на нелегалната дискриминација и враќање на можностите засновани на заслуги", January 21, 2025

Executive Order 13672, signed by U.S. President Barack Obama on July 21, 2014, amended two earlier executive orders to extend protection against discrimination in hiring and employment to additional classes. It prohibited discrimination in the civilian federal workforce on the basis of gender identity and in hiring by federal contractors on the basis of both sexual orientation and gender identity.

The executive order was rescinded by President Donald Trump on January 21, 2025.

== Provisions ==
This executive order amended President Richard Nixon's Executive Order 11478 (1969), which originally prohibited discrimination in the competitive service of the federal civilian workforce on the basis of race, color, religion, sex, national origin, handicap, and age. It had been amended in 1998 by President Bill Clinton's Executive Order 13087 to include sexual orientation. Executive Order 13672 added "gender identity".

This executive order also amended President Lyndon B. Johnson's 1965 Executive Order 11246, which originally punished discrimination by federal government contractors and sub-contractors on the basis of race, color, religion, sex, or national origin. Executive Order 13672 added "sexual orientation and gender identity".

The section of this order that applies to the federal workforce is effective immediately. The changes that affect government contractors take effect once the Department of Labor provides regulations supporting them, which White House a spokesman said would occur early in 2015.

== Background ==
While campaigning for the presidency in 2008, Obama had promised an executive order banning workplace discrimination on the basis of sexual orientation. On the basis of his campaign statement's, LGBT activists had long expected President Obama to issue an executive order prohibiting government contractors from discriminating on the basis of sexual orientation or gender identity. In January 2012, a group of LGBT advocates made their case for an executive order to the staff of Representative Barney Frank, the principal sponsor of federal legislation, the proposed Employment Non-Discrimination Act (ENDA), that would ban discrimination on the basis of sexual orientation in employment nationwide. It called an executive order an interim measure that would provide "a strong precedent for congressional passage of ENDA." Their presentation included research from the Williams Institute at UCLA to show that many federal contractors' employees were already protected against discrimination on the basis of sexual orientation by corporate policy, state statute, or local law. While LGBT advocates remained guarded about the possibility that an executive would be forthcoming, some were optimistic and one even said: "I predict the president will sign the ENDA executive order during the next few months or, maybe, he will save it for pride month in June."

In March 2012, 72 Democratic members of Congress led by Representative Frank Pallone of New Jersey asked the president to issue an executive order. They noted that most of the federal government's 25 largest contractors already had such policies, including all of the top five: Lockheed Martin, Boeing, Northrop Grumman, Raytheon, and General Dynamics. Questioned about reports that President Obama was not about to release an executive order, White House Press Secretary Jay Carney said on April 12 that the administration was supporting ENDA, "a legislative solution to LGBT employment discrimination", a strategy he compared to the president's earlier efforts to win repeal of the Defense of Marriage Act. He said:

We're deeply committed to working hand-in-hand with partners in the LGBT community on a number of fronts to build the case for employment non-discrimination policies including by complementing the existing body of compelling research with government-backed data and analysis, building a coalition of key stakeholders and decision-makers, directly engaging with and educating all sectors of the business community -- from major corporations to contractors to small business -- and raising public awareness about the human and financial costs of discrimination in the work force.

Joe Solmonese, president of the Human Rights Campaign, called the president's position disappointing and said: "Given the number of employees that would be covered by this executive order, it represents a critical step forward."

House members reiterated their request in another letter in March 2013 with 110 signers. In April 2013, the Obama administration told LGBT advocacy groups that it was still supporting ENDA and cited growing support for the legislation in Congress. In late April 2014, Vice President Joseph Biden reiterated the administration position, but agreed there was "no downside" to issuing an executive order covering government contractors. A writer in U.S. News & World Report noted that the administration had made similar arguments about the need for Congress to legislate an increase in the minimum wage and then, in the absence of Congressional action, issued an executive order in January 2014 to raise the rate paid by government contractors. In a change of position, the White House announced on June 16, that the President planned to issue an executive order covering government contractors and that it would cover approximately 14 million workers. A columnist in Forbes wrote in response to the announcement that "Discrimination is a nuanced issue, tough to completely clobber with one order from above. But banning it is smart business–and Obama’s leadership on this specific issue is certainly a step in the right direction."

Some religious groups asked the President to add exemptions for religious groups that function as federal contractors and object to employing LGBT persons, while others opposed such exemptions, viewing them as "a cover for overt discrimination". On June 25, 160 leaders of churches, religious institutions, and organizations sent a letter to President Obama asking him to exempt them from the requirements of the anticipated executive order. Without "a variety of views on the merits of such an executive order", they suggested language to be included in the order to allow them to maintain "staffing practices consistent with their deep religious convictions as they partner with the federal government via contracting or subcontracting", specifically allow them "religiously grounded employee belief and conduct requirements" as allowed in other contexts under Title VII of the 1964 Civil Rights Act. Signers included Leith Anderson, President, National Association of Evangelicals; Nathan Diament, executive director for Public Policy, Union of Orthodox Jewish Congregations of America; Stephan Bauman, President/CEO, World Relief; John Ashmen, President, Association of Gospel Rescue Missions; and Rev. Glenn M. Coleman, Presbyterian Church USA. A similar group of 14, including some of his political supporters, wrote the President, on July 1. They reminded him that his earlier opposition to same-sex marriage was based on his religious beliefs and asked him to "find a way to respect diversity of opinion ... in a way that respects the dignity of all parties". Signers included Rev. Larry Snyders of Catholic Charities USA and Dr. Rick Warren of Saddleback Church. U.S. Senator Orrin Hatch, one of the few national political figures to comment in advance of the order's release, also called for the President to include the comprehensive exemption for religious groups included in the version of ENDA that the Senate passed in November 2013. Just as the date for the release of the executive order approached, and religious exemption issue attracted increasing attention and on July 8 many LGBT advocacy groups withdrew their support for ENDA because of the religious exemptions included in the Senate version of the legislation.

On July 15, a group of 69 civil rights organizations and religious groups urged the President to take a different course by not only providing no exemption for religious groups and also rescinding the exemptions for religious groups put in place by President George W. Bush in his Executive Order 13279 in 2002. It said:

Religious freedom is one of our most cherished values, a fundamental and defining feature of our national character. It guarantees us the freedom to hold any belief we choose and the right to act on our religious beliefs within certain limits. It does not, however, provide organizations the right to discriminate using taxpayer dollars. When a religiously affiliated organization makes the decision to request a taxpayer-funded contract with the federal government, it must play by the same rules as every other federal contractor.

Organizations signing the letter included the American Jewish Committee, B'nai B'rith International, Catholics for Choice, the Hindu American Foundation, Human Rights Campaign, the Methodist Federation for Social Action, the NAACP, the National Education Association, the National Gay and Lesbian Task Force, the National Organization for Women, People For the American Way, and the Unitarian Universalist Association.

== Release ==
When signing this order, Obama said "America's federal contracts should not subsidize discrimination against the American people". He called for Congressional action to extend similar protections to all workers, noting that more states recognize same-sex marriage than prohibit discrimination in hiring on the basis of sexual orientation. By amending earlier executive orders, Obama did not create the extensive exemptions some religious groups were demanding, but left in place a narrower exemption established with respect to federal contractors in 2002 by President Bush's Executive Order 13279. That order protected the right of religious organizations engaged in social service activities to "the employment of individuals of a particular religion". It allows religious organizations, even when financed by federal contracts, to use religious belief as the basis for hiring and employment decisions.

The White House signing ceremony on July 21, 2014, was attended by Virginia Governor Terry McAuliffe, Tico Almeida, president of Freedom to Work, Rabbi David Saperstein of the Religious Action Center of Reform Judaism, Chad Griffin of the Human Rights Campaign, Winnie Stachelberg of the Center for American Progress, and U.S. Senators Tammy Baldwin Jeff Merkley, the leading proponents of ENDA in the Senate.

Ten days later, Obama signed a related Executive Order 13673, "Fair Pay and Safe Workplaces." It required companies receiving federal contracts over a half-million dollars to demonstrate compliance with labor laws, including those with LGBT protections. On March 27, 2017, President Trump revoked Executive Order 13673, meaning that companies no longer must prove their compliance with labor laws to retain their federal contracts. This action indirectly weakened Executive Order 13672.

== Reactions ==
In response, Roman Catholic officials expressed contrasting views. The chairs of two committees of the United States Conference of Catholic Bishops said in a joint statement:

In the name of forbidding discrimination, this order implements discrimination. With the stroke of a pen, it lends the economic power of the federal government to a deeply flawed understanding of human sexuality, to which faithful Catholics and many other people of faith will not assent. As a result, the order will exclude federal contractors precisely on the basis of their religious beliefs.

They objected in particular to the order's inclusion of gender identity, which they said "is predicated on the false idea that 'gender' is nothing more than a social construct or psychological reality that can be chosen at variance from one's biological sex." They said its implementation would:

...jeopardize the privacy and associational rights of both federal contractor employees and federal employees. For example, a biological male employee may be allowed to use the women's restroom or locker room provided by the employer because the male employee identifies as a female.

Father Larry Snyder, president of Catholic Charities USA, said that the executive order "upholds already existing religious exemptions that will allow us to maintain fidelity to our deeply held religious beliefs." He issued a statement that said:

As has always been the case, Catholic Charities USA supports the rights of all to employment and abides by the hiring requirements of all federal contracts.... Specifically, we are pleased that the religious exemption in this executive order ensures that those positions within Catholic Charities USA that are entrusted with maintaining our Catholic identity are to be held exempt.

Michael Galligan-Stierle, president of the Association of Catholic Colleges and Universities (ACCU) issued a statement that said his organization:

...stands with both the president and the U.S. bishops–each of whom has affirmed the principles of human dignity and diversity as key values of our nation and our faith. Where differences arise is in determining how to put those principles into practice, which can be complicated. Given that, ACCU is conferring with other faith-based organizations to determine the extent to which the executive order applies to our member colleges and universities. We remain hopeful that common ground between principle and practice may be found.

Douglas Laycock, a professor of law and religious studies at the University of Virginia, noted that the order maintained pre-existing protections for religious organizations:

And very important, [the] executive order creates no right for anyone to sue anyone else. So gay rights groups cannot organize litigation against religious contractors. Only the contracting agencies can enforce this order, and they may quietly enforce it with attention to religious liberty—which is what this administration has mostly done so far.

Jenny Yang, vice president of advocacy and policy for World Relief, which works under federal grants rather than contracts, said she was pleased that the order was limited, but worried that it might be extended in the future:

Our main concern is its implication on religious freedom down the line, where future executive orders could also include not just federal contractors but grantees as well. It's a slippery slope and we feel the need to speak up whenever we feel like religious freedom is threatened.

Commenting on behalf of the Family Research Council (FRC), Peter Sprigg called the order and example of "rule by decree" and said:

President Obama has ordered employers to put aside their principles, and practices in the name of political correctness. This level of coercion is nothing less than viewpoint blackmail that bullies into silence every contractor and subcontractor who has moral objections to homosexual behavior. This order gives activists a license to challenge their employers and expose those employers to threats of costly legal proceedings and the potential of jeopardizing future contracts.

FRC President Tony Perkins echoed Spriggs' language but emphasized the issue of gender identity. He wrote that the executive order required:

that all federal contractors and subcontractors–regardless of their religious and moral convictions–give special treatment to homosexuals, transgenders, and cross-dressers in the workplace.... [I]t accepts the premise that distinctions based on actual conduct–such as homosexual behavior and cross-dressing–should be treated the same way as distinctions based on immutable and innocuous characteristics like race..... The order further burdens contractors by stripping away their right to set dress and grooming standards.

Robert Jeffress, pastor of the First Baptist Church of Dallas, told Todd Starnes of Fox News that:

The problem with this executive order is that it paves the way for the next one – which could withhold the tax-exempt status or broadcast licenses for religious organizations holding biblical beliefs with which the administration disagrees.

Starnes concluded a column that discussed the executive order with "The Obama administration seems hell-bent on forcing Christians to assimilate to the militant LGBT agenda. Resistance is futile."

Andrea Lafferty of the Traditional Values Coalition wrote to supporters that Obama:

issued his executive order making gays, transgenders, and she-males protected classes among federal workers and contractors–refusing to include any religious exemption. In short, he told Christians that their religious liberty could take a long walk off a short pier.

Few Republican members of Congress commented on the President's action. House Speaker John Boehner, when asked if he had a reaction, said: "Nope. The president signs a lot of executive orders." Questioned again, he said: "Listen, the president is going to make his decisions. He can."

A spokesman for ExxonMobil, a large-scale government contractor that had long refused to add sexual orientation and gender identity protection to its corporate personnel policies, announced on July 22 that it planned to comply with the executive order. Dell issued a statement supporting the president's action.

== Enforcement ==
On December 3, 2014, the Department of Labor announced the text of its rule for enforcing this executive order, which takes effect 120 days following its publication in the Federal Register.

== See also ==
- Executive order (United States)
