= Cotran v. Rollins Hudig Hall Int'l, Inc. =

Cotran v. Rollins Hudig Hall Int’l, Inc., 17 Cal.4th 93 (1998), is a landmark California Supreme Court case that clarified how courts should evaluate “good cause” terminations when an implied employment contract exists. Richard Cotran was a high-level employee at Rollins Hudig Hall who was fired after two female coworkers accused him of sexual harassment. The company launched an internal investigation, and based on their findings, they decided to terminate him.

Cotran sued for wrongful termination. He claimed the accusations were false and argued that he could only be fired for just cause under an implied contract. The lower court originally ruled in Cotran's favor after the judge told the jury that the employer had to prove the harassment actually happened. Rollins Hudig Hall was ordered to pay Cotran $1.78 million in damages.

However, the decision was reversed and sent to the California Supreme Court. That court ruled that the main legal question wasn't whether Cotran actually committed sexual harassment, but whether the employer had conducted a fair investigation and had an honest and reasonable belief that misconduct occurred.

== Background ==
=== At-Will Employment ===
At-will employment means that either the employer or the employee can end the working relationship at any time, with or without a reason. In most jobs, this is the default rule. But in Cotran’s case, there was an implied contract that came up when he was first hired. Because of this, Cotran believed he couldn't be fired unless the company had a valid reason, also known as “just cause”.

=== Implied Employment Contracts ===
An implied employment contract is when an employer makes the employee believe that they can only be fired for good cause, even if there's nothing written down. This can happen through the employer’s policies or the way they communicate with the employee. In Cotran's case, he discussed this kind of contract when he was first hired, which made him believe that he had more job security and couldn't be fired without a valid reason.

=== Good Cause Termination ===
Good cause means there is a valid reason to fire an employee, like serious misconduct or not doing their job properly. This was important in Cotran’s case because it was the main reason he sued Rollins Hudig Hall. He believed there was no good cause for firing him, and that's why he claimed it was wrongful termination.

=== Employer's Duty of Fair Investigation ===
A fair investigation by an employer should be unbiased and focus on facts. It should include interviews with the people involved and look at all the information before making a decision. In Cotran, the investigation was done by the Equal Employment Opportunity compliance manager, who interviewed 21 people. The manager found evidence that supported the accusations, and both women who filed the complaints signed affidavits. After the investigation, the manager concluded it was more than likely that the harassment had occurred. The findings were given to the company president, who then made the decision to fire Cotran.

=== Case facts ===
Richard Cotran was a high-level employee at Rollins Hudig Hall. He was fired after two of his female coworkers accused him of sexual harassment. The company opened an investigation led by an Equal Employment Opportunity compliance manager, who interviewed 21 people and gathered supporting evidence, including signed affidavits from the two women. The manager concluded that it was more likely than not that the harassment had occurred and passed the findings on to the company president, who decided to fire Cotran.

After being fired, Cotran sued the company for wrongful termination. He claimed the accusations were false and said that he had an implied contract that protected him from being fired without good cause. The trial court ruled in Cotran’s favor and said the company had to prove the harassment happened beyond a doubt. Cotran was awarded $1.78 million. But that ruling was later overturned, and the case went to the California Supreme Court.

== Argument ==
=== Contran's argument ===
Cotran believed his firing was unfair. He said the sexual harassment claims were false and that he had an implied contract that meant he could only be fired for good cause. He argued that the company didn’t have solid proof and that the investigation wasn’t enough to justify firing him. He felt like he didn’t get a real chance to defend himself, and that the decision to fire him was based on assumptions, not facts.

=== Employer's argument ===
Rollins Hudig Hall argued that even if Cotran could only be fired for good cause, they had followed the proper steps. They pointed out that the investigation was handled fairly and included interviews, evidence, and signed affidavits. The company said it didn’t need to prove the harassment 100% — just that they honestly believed it happened based on a fair investigation. Because of that, they believed the firing was justified.

== Court's holding ==
Seal of the Supreme Court of California

The trial court originally ruled in Cotran’s favor. The judge told the jury that Rollins had to prove the sexual harassment actually happened beyond a doubt. Based on that, the jury decided Cotran had been wrongfully terminated.

Rollins appealed, and the case was sent to the California Supreme Court. The main question there was whether the company had to prove the misconduct really happened, or if it was enough that they had done a fair investigation and honestly believed it had. The Supreme Court ruled that what mattered was the fairness of the investigation and whether the employer had a reasonable and honest belief that the misconduct occurred. Because of that, they decided the termination was legal and reversed the trial court's decision.

== Significance ==
This case is relevant because it changed the way courts look at wrongful termination claims involving misconduct. Clarified employers do not have to prove that something bad actually happened. Instead, they just have to show proof of a fair investigation and believed the employee was at fault.

This decision protects employers as long as they follow the right process. It also shows employees that even if they have some job protection, they can still be fired if the company has a valid reason based on the facts they had at the time. The case reminds companies to take complaints seriously and follow fair steps before deciding to fire someone.
