= Project on the Status and Education of Women =

The Project on the Status and Education of Women (PSEW) was the first United States project focused on gender equity in education. Formed in 1971 by the Association of American Colleges (AAC), known today as the Association of American Colleges and Universities (AACU), PSEW worked to improve access to and equity within higher education for women, addressing the needs of university students, faculty, staff, and administrators. PSEW produced and distributed materials about the status of women in higher education, advised colleges and universities about policies related to affirmative action, women's studies programs, and hiring women faculty, and worked with policymakers to introduce legislation to improve gender equity in American higher education. PSEW's periodical, On Campus with Women (OCWW), ran from 1971–2013 through the AACU, publishing articles and research related to women in higher education. PSEW also played a significant role in the development and passage of Title IX, the portion of the U.S. Education Amendments of 1972 that prohibits discrimination in education on the basis of sex.

PSEW was dissolved as a separate project on June 30, 1991 and reincorporated into the AACU as the Program on the Status and Education of Women. The program was directed by Caryn McTighe Musil until its conclusion in 2012. An extensive collection of the materials and publications produced by PSEW is held at the Schlesinger Library at the Radcliffe Institute for Advanced Study at Harvard University.

== History and formation ==
The Project on the Status and Education of Women was founded in 1971 as the first step in a shift by the Association of American Colleges (now the Association of American Colleges and Universities) towards attention to student diversity. Located in the headquarters of the AACU in Washington, D.C., the organization operated with a small staff. PSEW received funding through grants, including from the Carnegie Corporation of New York and the Ford Foundation.

PSEW was integral in the passage of Title IX. As part of this effort, the organization visited schools, educated lawmakers on women's issues in academia, and advocated for policies to improve women's situation on campuses. PSEW pursued a focus on sexual harassment and rape on campus, producing educational materials on these subjects in the 1980s. Notably, the organization coined the term "chilly climate", used in many of its works to describe the challenges faced by women in education.

=== People ===
Bernice Resnick Sandler served as the director of PSEW from 1971-1991. Sandler was also active in the Women's Equity Action League (WEAL), through which she did similar work promoting gender equity in higher education. After Sandler, Caryn McTighe Musil served as director of the successor Program on the Status and Education of Women (PSEW) until 2012.

Margaret C. Dunkle served as the Associate President of PSEW from 1972-1977. Roberta M. Hall and Grace L. Mastalli were also important staff members.

== Main contributions ==
=== Publications ===
PSEW was founded to aid colleges and universities in developing policies that addressed gender discrimination and sexual harassment. However, their work soon expanded beyond this mission, as PSEW staff began publishing original work on women in higher education. PSEW published over 100 reports, as well as booklets, pamphlets, and their newsletter On Campus with Women. Their publications addressed a range of subjects including recruiting women students and faculty, issues relevant to minority students, sex discrimination in hiring, sex bias in research, Title IX, financial assistance, sexual harassment on campus, and the academic climate for women. Their materials reached college presidents and faculty as well as policymakers, and not only disseminated information about events and research relating to women in education, but also informed women directly about their own legal rights to education. PSEW published the first papers on women of color in higher education and the first national reports on sex discrimination in college sports, hostile classroom environments, campus gang rape, and sexual harassment.

==== "Chilly Climate" ====
The organization additionally produced publications addressing a term it coined, the "chilly climate" facing women at colleges and universities, a program of discourse which became a defining initiative for the group's contributions to equality in education. The "chilly climate" was illustrated by descriptions of challenges experienced by women students and faculty, from disparaging comments made about women and their academic capacities to the sidelining and interruption of women in class. PSEW's discussion of these challenges to women's experiences in a learning environment contributed to wider dialogue about the unequal learning environments experienced by people from various underserved groups.

The project published several influential works on the topic. In 1982, Hall and Sandler published "The Classroom Climate: A Chilly One for Women?" The paper was funded by a grant from the Fund for the Improvement of Postsecondary Education (FIPSE) of the U.S. Department of Education. PSEW held a conference in November 1982 called "The Chilly Classroom Climate: Sharing Strategies for Change" to publicize and discuss its findings. The final paper distributed at the conference sold over 40,000 copies between 1982 and 1990.

==== On Campus with Women ====
Perhaps PSEW's most prominent publication was their periodical, On Campus with Women (OCWW), which published research and articles on issues pertaining to women in higher education. Founded by Sandler at the inception of the PSEW in 1971, its content focused on women's leadership, campus climate, curriculum and pedagogy, and new research on women's participation in higher education. In the fall of 2002, OCWW moved exclusively online. In 2013, the publication of On Campus with Women as a separate periodical ended, and its mission to cover gender issues in higher education was absorbed by the AACU's other journals, such as Liberal Education and Diversity and Democracy.

=== Advocacy ===
==== Title IX ====
PSEW played in an integral role in working with Congressional staff and other organizations on the drafting and implementation of Title IX, interfacing with other organizations and Congress to construct and pass the law. PSEW also acted as a resource for universities to consult on potential implementation and policy between the law's June 1972 passage and the 1975 final report on enforcement and regulations from the Department of Health, Education, and Welfare. The organization helped colleges and universities to institute policies that limited their risk of violating the Title IX requirements. During this interim period, PSEW often worked with the National Coalition for Women and Girls in Education (NCWGE), a consortium of organizations founded to advocate for implementation regulations of Title IX on the enforcement, implementation, and funding of women's educational programs.

==== Post-Title IX ====
After Title IX became law, PSEW continued to educate policymakers and government officials about women's issues on college campuses. PSEW staff often visited college campuses to identify issues and to work with administrations on the implementation and enforcement of Title IX. PSEW also created educational materials on rape and sexual harassment as resources for campuses.

== Legacy and absorption into AACU ==
The Project on the Status and Education of Women was the first national project directed at women of higher education and was one of first programs to address gender differences regarding campus climate. The project's involvement on the continued enforcement and implementation of Title IX has had lasting effects, as well as its creation and distribution of educational materials related to sexual harassment. Since its formation, PSEW has spearheaded a number of initiatives advocating gender equity in higher education.

PSEW was dissolved as a separate project on June 30, 1991 as part of a push to focus on women's issues throughout the programming of the AAC. Sandler left her position of leadership and the group was reconstituted as the Program on the Status and Education of Women (PSEW). Upon being absorbed into the AACU, PSEW's primary source of funding no longer came from grants, as they were able to receive funding from the AACU. Musil directed the program until its conclusion in 2012, as the AACU redefined its mission to incorporate issues of gender equity. Some important reports and projects that were created during Musil's tenure were the report "A Measure of Equity: Women's Progress in Higher Education (2008)" and the establishment of the Campus Women Lead, which offered workshops on women's leadership, and the Women's Leadership Project for Inclusive Excellence.

== List of publications ==
- Attwood, Cynthia L. Women in fellowship and training programs. Project on the Status and Education of Women, Association of American Colleges, 1972.
- Ehrhart, Julie Kuhn and Bernice R. Sandler. Looking for More Than a Few Good Women in Traditionally Male Fields. Project on the Status and Education of Women, Association of American Colleges, 1987.
- Ginorio, Angela B. Warming the climate for women in academic science. Washington, D.C : Association of American Colleges and Universities, Program on the Status and Education of Women, 1995.
- Hall, Roberta M. Out of the classroom: a chilly campus climate for women? Project on the Status and Education of Women, Association of American Colleges, c1984.
- Hune, Shirley. Asian Pacific American women in higher education : claiming visibility & voice. Washington, DC: Association of American Colleges and Universities, Program on the Status and Education of Women, c1998.
- Moses, Yolanda T. Black women in academe: issues and strategies. Project on the Status and Education of Women, Association of American Colleges, c1989.
- Nieves-Squires, Sarah. Hispanic Women: making their presence on campus less tenuous. Association of American Colleges, Program on the Status and Education of Women, 1991.
- Project On The Status and Education Of Women. Financial Aid: A Partial List of Resources for Women. Association Of American Colleges, 1978.
- Project on the Status and Education of Women. The Problem of rape on campus. Association of American Colleges, c1978.
- Project on the Status and Education of Women. What constitutes equality for women in sport? : Federal law puts women in the running. Association of American Colleges, 1974.
- Project on the Status and Education of Women. Women and film : a resource handbook. Association of American Colleges, 1970s.
- Project on the Status and Education of Women. Women's centers—where are they? Association of American Colleges, 1974.
- Sandler, Bernice R. The Campus Climate Revisited: Chilly Climate for Women Faculty, Administrators and Graduate Students. Program on the Status and Education of Women, Association of American Colleges, 1986.
- Touchton, Judy, Caryn McTighe Musil, and Kathryn Peltier Campbell. A Measure of Equity: Women's Progress in Higher Education. Association of American Colleges and Universities, 2008.
