= Ruth Schellberg =

American women's rights activist (1912–2004)

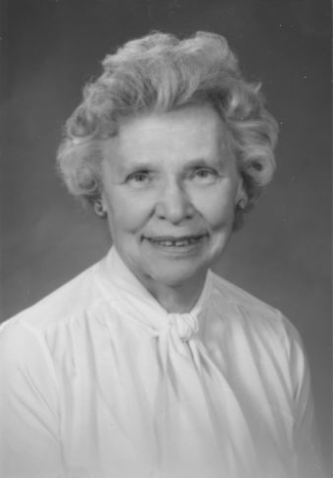
- Ruth Schellberg in 1970
- Born: July 10, 1912; Omaha, Nebraska, U.S.
- Died: October 13, 2004 (aged 92)

Ruth M. Schellberg (July 22, 1912 – October 13, 2004) was a women’s rights activist, head of the physical education department at Mankato State University (now Minnesota State University, Mankato), and an avid nature and recreation enthusiast. During her career, she sponsored and led over 75 canoe trips, implemented Title IX policies, and became president of the Minnesota Branch of the Women’s Equity Action League.

== Early life and education ==
Schellberg was born on July 22, 1912, in Omaha, Nebraska to Otto and Clara Schellberg. She was the oldest of four children and the only girl. Her father, Otto, was an office manager for the Western Union Telegraph Company and an avid outdoorsman. In 1922, he enrolled Ruth in the Camp Fire Girls program, where she developed a passion for nature and physical education. It was at this camp that Schellberg found that she “had a mission in life and that mission was to teach the world how to swim”.

In 1930, Schellberg enrolled in the physical education program at the University of Nebraska. During this time, she was heavily influenced by Mabel Lee, the chairperson of the physical education department, who inspired Schellberg to go into a career in sports administration. After obtaining her undergraduate degree, Schellberg attended New York University to get both her master's and PhD.

From 1934 until 1939, Schellberg served as a canoeing instructor at Camp Sweyolakan, a Camp Fire Girls camp on Lake Coeur d'Alene in Idaho.

== Career ==
Schellberg’s first academic position was at the University of Minnesota in 1937, receiving a salary of $1200. After a year, Schellberg left to work as the Director of Physical Education for Women at Macalester College in St. Paul. During this time, she began to offer classes in canoeing and hiking, forming programs that she would continue throughout her life. In 1952, Schellberg took a position as the head of the physical education and recreation department at Minnesota State University, Mankato. She worked to expand the universities’ women’s sports program, successfully increasing both its funding and offerings during her tenure.

Throughout her career at MNSU, Schellberg was active in many community and national organizations such as serving on the committee of the International Association for Physical Education and Sport for Girls and Women (ICHPER), and as the chair of the Archives Historical Advisory Committee (AHAC). At the AHAC, Schellberg stated that it was her mission to “continue the archival efforts started by [her] teacher, Mabel Lee”, who had inspired her to pursue a career in physical education.

After Title IX was passed in 1972, offering protection from sex-based discrimination, Schellberg joined the Women’s Equity Action League to expand women’s sports programs and female university employee rights in general. After a year, she became the League’s state president and was involved in a state-wide lawsuit fighting for backpay and equal wages for all female employees of state-funded Minnesota universities.

== Later life ==
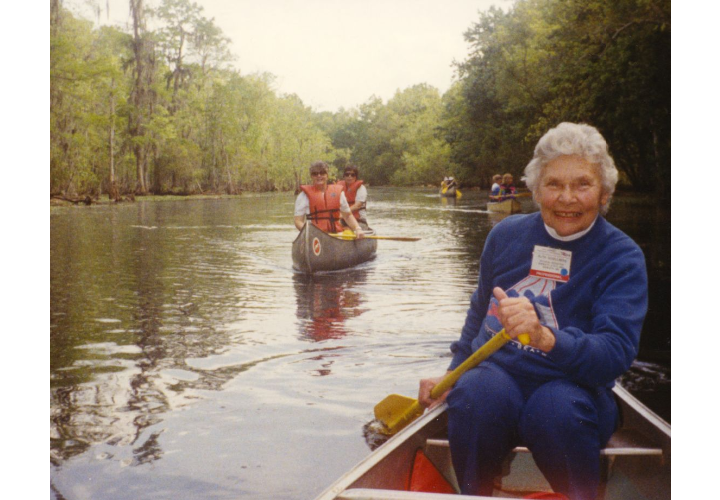
Schellberg canoeing, 1970.

After her official retirement in 1974, Schellberg continued to lead canoe trips in the Boundary Waters Canoe Area of Minnesota, as well as being involved with Camp Fire on a national level. In 1982, she received an American Alliance for Health, Physical Education, Recreation and Dance (AAHPERD) Honor Award for her outstanding contributions to women’s recreation in Minnesota. Ruth Schellberg died in In 2004 at the age of 92.
