= Executive Order 11375 =

1967 order against sex discrimination in hiring

- Amending Executive Order No. 11246, Relating to Equal Employment Opportunity

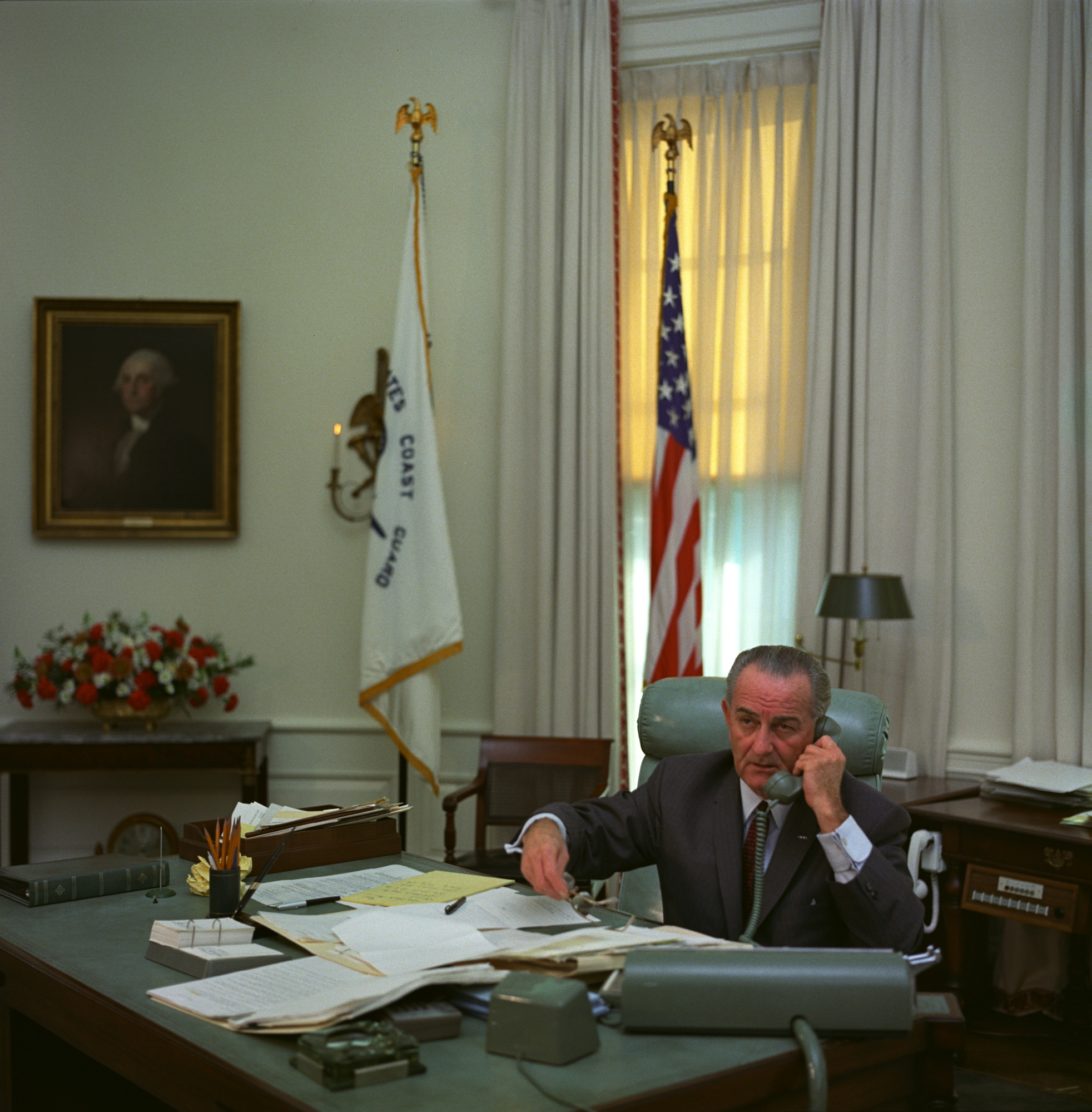
- President Johnson in Oval Office
- Type: Executive order
- Number: 11375
- President: Lyndon B. Johnson
- Signed: October 13, 1967

Summary
- Banned discrimination on the basis of sex in hiring and employment in both the United States federal workforce and on the part of government contractors

Repealed by
- Executive Order 14173, "Ending Illegal Discrimination And Restoring Merit-Based Opportunity", January 21, 2025

Executive Order 11375, signed by President Lyndon B. Johnson on October 13, 1967, banned discrimination on the basis of sex in hiring and employment in both the United States federal workforce and on the part of government contractors.

== Background ==
During the legislative effort to enact the Civil Rights Act of 1964, "sex" was not among the categories the bill initially covered. In the House of Representatives, Southern opponents of the legislation, led by Reprensentative Howard Smith of Virginia, proposed adding "sex" to the original list (race, color, religion, or national origin). Smith had supported women's rights for decades, but others thought that the amendment would make the bill unacceptable its more moderate supporters and then lead to its defeat. Civil rights groups and even the American Association of University Women opposed the addition, but a coalition of conservative opponents of civil rights legislation and liberal civil rights advocates voted to include "sex." The bill thus eventually passed with the word.

Authorities charged with responsibility for enforcing the Civil Rights Act focused on racial discrimination and belittled sex-based discrimination. The Equal Employment Opportunity Commission (EEOC), charged with enforcing the 1964 act, even decided in 1965 that segregated job advertising, "Help Wanted Male" and "Help Wanted Female," was permissible because it served "the convenience of readers". Advocates frustrated with the acceptance of sex bias for women's rights founded the National Organization for Women (NOW) in June 1966.

Franklin D. Roosevelt, Jr., the head of the EEOC, counseled patience and pointed out that because of the way the word "sex" had been inserted into the legislation, the EEOC had no legislative history or testimony before Congressional committees to guide it through "a number of very serious problems of interpretation, implementation and jurisdiction." NOW and other women's advocacy groups and the President's Citizens Advisory Group on the Status of Women urged President Lyndon Johnson to bring government policy with respect to sex discrimination into line with other forms of bias prevention. Assistant Secretary of Labor Esther Peterson lent support as well.

On the day that Johnson signed Executive Order 11375, John W. Macy. Jr., chairman of the Civil Service Commission, noted that women generated about a third of the complaints his agency received about unfair employment practices, although they represented a modest proportion of the federal workforce. He said women held 658 of the 23,000 jobs paying $18,000 annually, 74 of the 5,000 paying $20,000, 41 of the 2,300 paying $22,000, and 36 of the 17,000 paying $25,000.

== Provisions ==
This Executive Order added the category "sex" to the anti-discrimination provisions covered in Johnson's earlier Executive Order 11246 of September 24, 1965, which addressed discrimination on the basis of race, color, religion, or national origin. It went far beyond earlier civil rights legislation. Unlike the Equal Pay Act of 1963, it applied to those working in administrative, executive, and professional positions. Unlike the Civil Rights Act's Title VII, it did not exclude teaching personnel.

The order provided that the Civil Service Commission (CSC) would be able to hear complaints of sex-based discrimination from employees of the federal government one month after the order was issued. As of one year after its issuance, it authorized the Bureau of Labor to investigate and address similar complaints from those employed by government contractors.

== Enforcement ==
Lobbying of members of Congress on the part of women's groups, notably the Women's Equity Action League (WEAL), prompted a variety of government agencies to undertake their enforcement obligations.

When the Labor Department issued details rules as provided for in this Executive Order on June 9, 1970, it defined contractors as any business enterprise with a government contract valued at $50,000 or more and 50 or more employees. Its Office of Federal Contract Compliance (OFCC) would oversee enforcement. Labor's rules included a ban on advertising job openings under the headings "male" and "female" unless the applicant's sex was "a bona fide job qualification" and it banned restricting specific jobs or limiting seniority on the basis of sex. The rules had been recommended by the President's Task Force on Women's Rights and Responsibilities in December 1969.

Despite the primary role given to Labor in the Executive Order, each agency of the federal government that entered into contracts had responsibility for compliance with OFCC regulations on the part of those who held its contracts. Labor designated the Department of Health, Education, and Welfare as the compliance agency for institutions of higher learning. After HEW gathered statistics and discovered disparities in men's and women's wages and patterns of promotion in higher education, it established a special division devoted to investigating complaints against colleges and universities, the Office of Civil Rights and was assigning field staff as early as July 1968. Discrimination in higher education was sufficiently highlighted that Congress addressed it in the Education Amendments of 1972, the landmark legislation known as Title IX.

Though OFCC regulations required the creation of "goals and timetables" for affirmative actions to remedy past discriminatory employment practices, government officials hesitated to apply them to sex as they did to race. Secretary of Labor James Hodgson told a group of ten advocates for women on July 25, 1970 that "employment problems of women are different". He allowed that sex-based discrimination was "subtle and more pervasive than against any other minority group. In response, women's groups mounted demonstrations in more than a dozen cities. On July 31, Hodgson attempted to clarify his remarks, endorsing in principle the idea of "goals and timetables" for relieving sex discrimination, but saying that the procedures for establishing them with respect to other forms of discrimination were "not sufficient to meet the more difficult and elusive problem of sex discrimination." He explained that: "The work force pattern of women and racial minorities differs in significant respects. Many women do not seek employment. Practically all adult males do. Many occupations sought after by all racial groups have not been sought by women in significant numbers." He promised "immediate consultations" within two weeks with interested parties. Advisory committees were set to meet in May 1971.

Under the authority and direction of this Executive Order, the Civil Service Commission established the Federal Women's Program to implement programs to ensure women's employment and advancement in the federal workforce.

This Executive Order provided the basis for the federal government's investigation of the hiring practices than 2,000 colleges and universities, following complaints in the spring of 1970 against 150 institutions by the WEAL and NOW. A government official said about a dozen had been denied funds for failing to comply with requests for employment records and that all but three eventually complied. Dr. Bernice Sandler of the Equity Action League commented: "After all, there are no Federal laws dealing with sex discrimination. That's why we are forcing the issue by filing complaints under the terms of the executive order." She said her organization had filed complaints against the California state system, Columbia University and others, and that investigations were active at Harvard University, Loyola of Chicago, George Washington University, and others. She explained that she had come upon the Executive Order accidentally:

I was reading the 1965 Executive order and happened to see an asterisk. Since I am an academic person, I read the footnote and saw that the order was amended in 1968 [sic] to include women. A eureka-like alarm went off in my head and within months we filed charges against the University of Maryland.

By the late 1970s, the Carter administration was using the rules established under Executive Order 11375 against large businesses like Uniroyal, which had sex-segregated manufacturing facilities. Most companies went to court to obstruct the government's attempts to monitor and regulate their hiring practices and decisions. Only General Dynamics and United Airlines negotiated settlements.

== Sources ==
- Patricia G. Zelman, Women, Work, and National Policy: The Kennedy-Johnson Years (Ann Arbor, Michigan: UMI Research Press, 1982)
