= Diversity, equity, and inclusion =

Organizational frameworks and programs

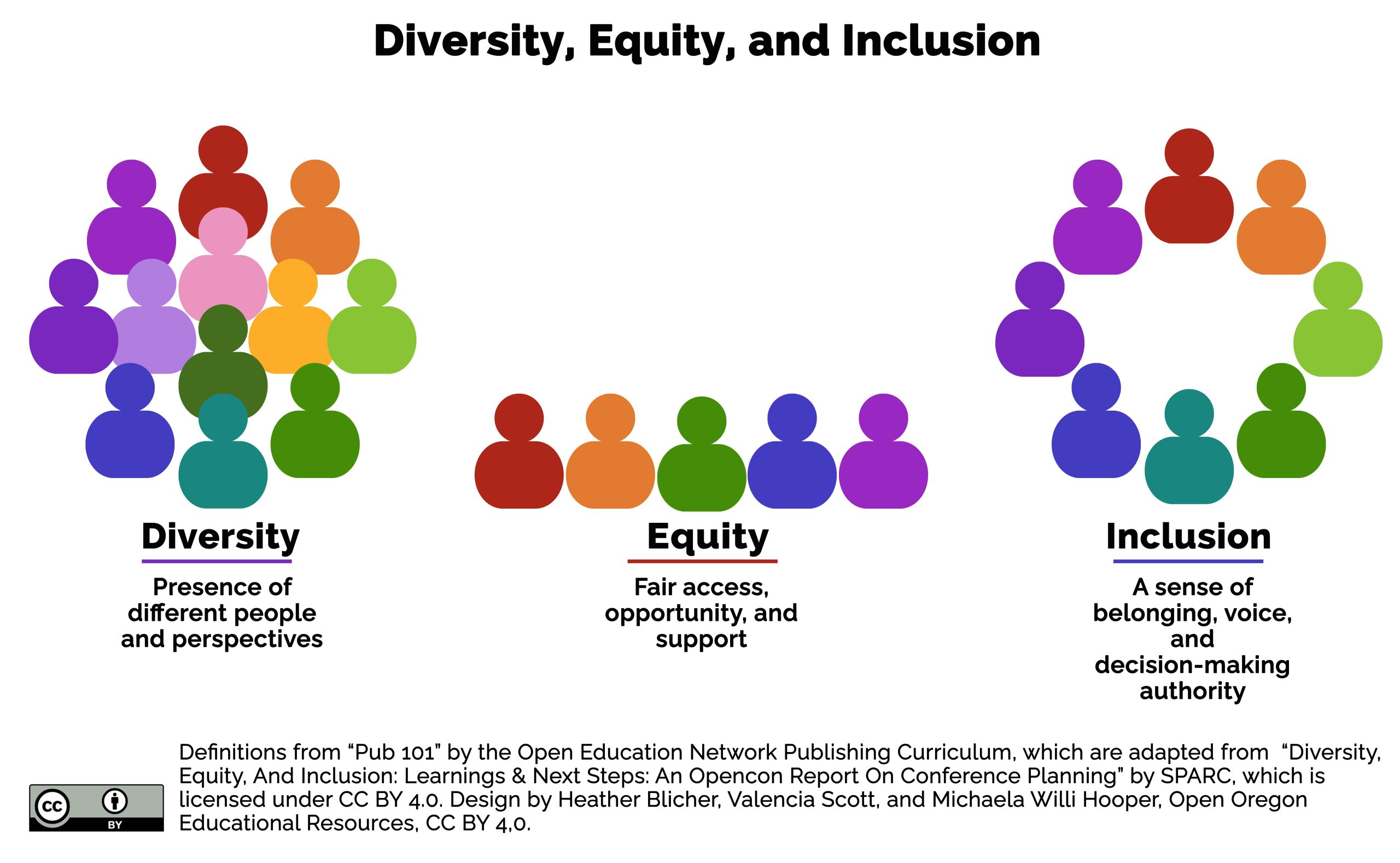
Simplified abstract illustration of diversity, equity, and inclusion

Diversity, equity, and inclusion (DEI, also known in the United Kingdom as equality, diversity, and inclusion (EDI)) are organizational frameworks that seek to promote the fair treatment and full participation of all people, particularly groups who have historically been underrepresented, marginalized, or subject to discrimination based on identity or disability. These three notions (diversity, equity, and inclusion) together represent "three closely linked values", which organizations seek to institutionalize through DEI frameworks.

Diversity refers to the presence of variety within the organizational workforce in characteristics, such as race, gender, ethnicity, sexual orientation, disability, age, politics, culture, class, veteran status, or religion. Equity refers to concepts of fairness and justice, such as fair compensation and substantive equality. More specifically, equity usually also includes a focus on societal disparities, allocating resources, "decision making authority to groups that have historically been disadvantaged", and taking "into consideration a person's unique circumstances, adjusting treatment accordingly so that the end result is equal". Inclusion refers to creating an organizational culture that creates an experience where "all employees feel their voices will be heard" and a sense of belonging and integration.

While DEI is most associated with non-elected government or corporate environments, it is commonly implemented within many types of organizations, such as charitable organizations, schools, and hospitals. DEI policies often include certain training efforts, such as diversity training.

DEI policies are disputed, especially in the United States. Supporters say they correct discrimination and help organizations work better. Studies of diversity training, one of the most common DEI tools, have often found little or no effect, and some critics say DEI programs restrict free speech and academic freedom. Other critics, mostly conservatives, say the programs themselves discriminate against people outside the targeted groups, and some use "DEI" as a derogatory label for minority employees.

In 2023, the Supreme Court ruled in Students for Fair Admissions v. Harvard that colleges could not use race as a factor in admissions. Several Republican-led states then passed laws restricting DEI offices and programs at public universities. In January 2025, President Donald Trump ordered federal DEI programs ended, and in 2024 and 2025 a number of large companies scaled back their programs while others kept them.

== Other terminology and extensions ==
An extended version of the DEI concept, known as "diversity, equity, inclusion, and accessibility" (DEIA, IDEA, or DEAI), explicitly names accessibility as one of the aspects to be paid attention to in frameworks and policies that aim at the fair treatment and full participation of all.

The concepts of DEI predate the terminology, and variations sometimes include terms such as "belonging", "justice", and "accessibility". As such, frameworks such as "inclusion and diversity" (I&D); "diversity, equity, inclusion, and belonging" (DEIB); and "justice, equity, diversity, and inclusion" (JEDI or EDIJ) exist.

In the United Kingdom, the term "equality, diversity, and inclusion" (EDI) is used in a similar way.

== History in the United States ==
=== Early history ===
DEI policies include affirmative action. The legal term "affirmative action" was first used in Executive Order 10925, signed by President John F. Kennedy on 6 March 1961, which included a provision that government contractors "take affirmative action to ensure that applicants are employed, and employees are treated [fairly] during employment, without regard to their race, creed, color, or national origin". It was used to promote actions that achieve non-discrimination. In September 1965, President Lyndon B. Johnson issued Executive Order 11246 which required government employers to "hire without regard to race, religion and national origin" and "take affirmative action to ensure that applicants are employed and that employees are treated during employment, without regard to their race, color, religion, sex or national origin". The Civil Rights Act of 1964 prohibited discrimination based on race, color, religion, sex or national origin. The bill's Senate floor manager, Senator Hubert Humphrey, said in opening the debate that the bill did not require racial quotas and that under it "race shall not be a basis for making personnel decisions".

More recently, concepts have moved beyond discrimination to include diversity, equity, and inclusion as motives for preferring historically underrepresented groups. In the landmark opinion of 1978, Regents of the University of California v. Bakke, diversity became a constitutional law factor. The Supreme Court ruled that racial quotas were illegal, but it was allowable to consider race as a plus factor when trying to foster "diversity" in their classes.

=== 1980s ===
Diversity themes gained momentum in the mid-1980s. At a time when President Ronald Reagan discussed dismantling equality and affirmative action laws in the 1980s, equality and affirmative action professionals employed by American firms along with equality consultants engaged in establishing the argument that a diverse workforce should be seen as a competitive advantage rather than just as a legal constraint. Their message was not to promote diversity because it is a legal mandate but because it is good for business. From then on, researchers started to test a number of hypotheses on the business benefits of diversity and diversity management, known as the business case of diversity.

=== 2000s to early-2020s ===
By 2003, corporations spent $8 billion annually on diversity efforts. In 2011, President Barack Obama signed Executive Order 13583 concerning diversity and inclusion.

After the #MeToo and Black Lives Matter movements, Time magazine stated in 2019 that the DEI industry had "exploded" in size. Within academia, a 2019 survey found that spending on DEI efforts had increased 27 percent over the five preceding academic years. In 2019, the Federal Aviation Administration (FAA) announced a pilot program to provide training opportunities for prospective air traffic controllers with "targeted" disabilities. A 2020 estimate by Global Industry Analysts placed the size of the global diversity and inclusion market at $7.5 billion, of which $3.4 billion was in the United States. Global Industry Analysts projected that the global market would reach $17.2 billion by 2027.

In September 2020, President Donald Trump signed Executive Order 13950, which prohibited the use of "divisive concepts" relating to race or sex "stereotyping" or "scapegoating" in workplace training by government contractors.

In January 2021, President Joe Biden signed Executive Order 13985 after taking office, which directed federal agencies to rescind activities related to Executive Order 13950. In June 2021, he signed Executive Order 14035, which directed the government to enhance its ability to "recruit, hire, develop, promote, and retain talented individuals and to act as a model employer" for diversity, equity, inclusion, and accessibility (DEIA).

In 2021, New York magazine stated that "the business became astronomically larger than ever" after the murder of George Floyd in May 2020. The Economist has also stated that surveys of international companies indicate that the number of people hired for jobs with "diversity" or "inclusion" in the title more than quadrupled since 2010.

In 2023, the Supreme Court explicitly rejected affirmative action regarding race in college admissions in Students for Fair Admissions v. Harvard. The Court held that affirmative action programs "lack sufficiently focused and measurable objectives warranting the use of race, unavoidably employ race in a negative manner, involve racial stereotyping, and lack meaningful endpoints. We have never permitted admissions programs to work in that way, and we will not do so today".

As of 2024, affirmative action in the United States had been increasingly replaced by emphasis on diversity, equity, and inclusion, while nine states explicitly banned affirmative action use in the employment process.

=== Mid-2020s ===
In the early-2020s, U.S. conservatives increasingly criticized DEI practices, arguing that they are "reverse discrimination" against a white majority. During his 2024 presidential campaign, Donald Trump promoted plans to combat "anti-white racism" in government and corporate America. After his inauguration on January 20, 2025, Trump issued an executive order ordering that all DEIA programs run by the federal government and its executive departments be terminated, arguing that DEIA constituted "illegal and immoral discrimination programs" and "public waste". Employees assigned to DEI programs were placed on administrative leave for eventual layoff. The following day, Trump issued Executive Order 14173, which applied similar requirements to federal agencies and contractors, and rescinded Executive Order 11246—directing agency heads to promote merit-based principles.

The Department of Justice has launched lawsuits against companies alleging they practice "illegal DEI", arguing that DEI itself constitutes discrimination. U.S. government departments have ordered probes of organizations that practice DEI, including hospitals, universities, federal contractors, and media companies. They have also pressured foreign companies with U.S. government contracts to comply with the order, drawing ire from foreign officials. References to women, people of color, and LGBTQ individuals have been removed from federal websites, image archives, and physical installations.

In early-February 2025, a lawsuit was filed against Trump's executive orders, arguing that they were unconstitutional. In March, the United States Court of Appeals for the Fourth Circuit paused the lower court's nationwide preliminary injunction and permitted the enforcement of the executive orders pending the outcome of the appeal.

In 2024 and 2025, several large American companies scaled back or ended their DEI programs, owing to pressure from President Trump and his administration and, in some cases, related policies, such as participation in the Corporate Equality Index. These included Google, Boeing, Disney, Walmart, Meta, Amazon, McDonald's, Ford, Lowe's, Harley-Davidson, John Deere, Tractor Supply, Target, Toyota, and PBS. Generally, these companies said they will continue to foster a safe and inclusive workplace, while ending or reducing policies, initiatives, or programs that specifically take note of protected status. In this period, other companies reaffirmed their commitment to DEI, including Apple, Ben & Jerry's, Delta Air Lines, Deutsche Bank, Microsoft, JPMorgan Chase, Goldman Sachs, Costco and the National Football League.

== Rationale ==
Affirmative action is intended to promote the opportunities of defined minority groups within a society to give them equal access to that of the majority population. The philosophical basis of the policy has various rationales, including, but not limited to, compensation for past discrimination, correction of current discrimination, and the diversification of society. It is often implemented in governmental and educational settings to ensure that designated groups within a society can participate in all promotional, educational, and training opportunities.

The stated justification for affirmative action by its proponents is to help compensate for past discrimination, persecution or exploitation by the ruling class of a culture, and to address existing discrimination.

== Methods and arguments ==
As of 2022, academic institutions in the US have made commitments to DEI in different ways, including creating documents, programs, and appointing dedicated staff members. Many accreditation agencies now require supporting DEI. As of 2014, information on DEI for both students and professors was widespread in colleges and universities, with many schools requiring training and meetings on the topic. Many scholarships and opportunities at universities have a secondary purpose of encouraging diversity. Some students from minority groups report feeling reduced to fulfilling a "diversity quota". An American Psychological Association article for teachers says that discussing diversity in the classroom improves students' critical thinking and academic achievement. Measures to increase the political diversity in higher education have been proposed to reduce political bias and conformity.

=== Corporate ===
Following the murder of George Floyd in 2020, some companies made substantial commitments to racial equity by establishing dedicated diversity, equity, and inclusion teams. In early 2024, the Washington Post reported that there is a trend in corporate United States to reduce DEI positions and delegate the work to external consultants. The number of DEI jobs reached its highest point in early 2023, but subsequently decreased by 5 percent that year and has further shrunk by 8 percent in 2024. The attrition rate for DEI roles has been approximately twice as high as that of non-DEI positions. Companies that rolled back their DEI initiatives cited the 2023 Supreme Court's decision in Students for Fair Admissions v. Harvard and similar actions of other companies. The pullback came as legal challenges and political opposition to such programs increased.

Several reports and academic studies have found a correlation between financial benefits and DEI, while other studies dispute these claims. At an aggregate level, a 2013 study found that birth country diversity of the labor force positively impacts a nation's long term productivity and income. Studies of individual firms have found that whether diversity pays off depends on conditions inside and outside the firm. A 2024 study reported evidence of a causal link between workforce gender diversity and financial performance in major firms.

In August 2021, the US Securities and Exchange Commission (SEC) approved Nasdaq's proposed rules requiring listed companies to ensure women and minority directors were on their boards or provide an explanation of why they were not. In December 2024, the US Court of Appeals for the Fifth Circuit held in Alliance for Fair Board Recruitment v. SEC that the SEC lacked the authority to approve these rules. A California judge held in 2022 that a similar board diversity law violated the California Constitution.

== Political and public reaction in the U.S. ==
=== K-12 Schools ===
On January 29, 2025, President Donald Trump signed an executive order titled "Ending Radical Indoctrination in K-12 Schooling". On April 3, 2025, the Department of Education gave state education agencies 10 days to certify that their schools complied with its reading of federal anti-discrimination law or risk losing federal funding.

On April 24, 2025, three federal judges, in New Hampshire, Maryland and Washington, D.C., blocked enforcement of the requirement.

=== Higher education ===
Since 2023, Republican-dominated US state legislatures have considered bills against DEI efforts, primarily at state colleges and universities. That change has been taking place amid heavy legal pressures. The Supreme Court's June 2023 decision in Students for Fair Admissions v. Harvard ended the use of race in college admissions but did not directly affect employers. Since then conservative activists organized in the states to dismantle race-conscious policies in various aspects of the economy.

As of 2024, the Chronicle of Higher Education had tracked over 80 bills introduced in state legislatures since 2023. Of these, eight had become law, 25 had failed to pass, and the rest were pending. Two bills became law in Florida and Texas; and one each in North Carolina, North Dakota, Tennessee, and Utah. Florida now prohibits public colleges from requiring "political loyalty tests" as a condition of employment, admission, or promotion. The other Florida law prohibits public colleges from spending state or federal funds on DEI, unless required by federal law. One Texas law prohibits DEI practices or programs, including training, that are not in compliance with the state Constitution regarding equality. The other law bans DEI offices and staff, as well as mandatory diversity training. It also bans identity-based diversity statements that give preference regarding race or sex.

=== Entertainment and media ===
In 2020, several prominent actors and directors criticized diversity standards, such as at the Academy Awards. Beginning in 2024, to be eligible for a best-picture nomination at the Academy Awards, a film must meet two of four diversity standards in order to qualify.

In 2023, Actor Richard Dreyfuss stated the Academy Award's diversity and inclusion standards "make me vomit", arguing that art should not be morally legislated. Several major film directors, who are voting members of the Academy Awards, anonymously expressed their opposition to the new diversity standards to The New York Post, with one describing them as "contrived". Film critic Armond White attacked the new standards as "progressive fascism", comparing them to the Hays Code.

In 2021, Conservative media sources, such as National Review, have been frequent critics of DEI, with contributor George Leef arguing it is authoritarian and anti-meritocratic.

=== Politics ===
In the 2020s, DEI came into the spotlight in American politics, especially in state legislatures in Texas and other Republican-controlled states. Several states are considering or have passed legislation targeting DEI in public institutions. In March 2023, the Texas House of Representatives passed a bill with a rider banning the use of state funds for DEI programs in universities and colleges. In May 2023, Texas passed legislation banning offices and programs promoting DEI at publicly funded colleges and universities. In Iowa, a bill to ban spending on DEI in public universities was also advanced in March 2023.

Several prominent Republicans positioned themselves as critics, including Florida Governor Ron DeSantis, Texas Governor Greg Abbott, and 2024 presidential candidate Vivek Ramaswamy. In January 2024, the Florida Board of Education banned federal or state money being used toward DEI programs in universities.

After the 2024 election, DEI has also produced a growing divide inside the Democratic Party. Rep. Adam Smith, ranking Democrat on the U.S. House Committee on Armed Services, for instance, stated that DEI efforts go "off the beam, to my mind, when they imply that racism, bigotry and settler colonialism is the unique purview of white people. ... You don't need to imply that all white people are racists, and that all white people are oppressors".

=== Military ===
Another significant point of political controversy has been the implementation of DEI frameworks in the military, with Republican politicians frequently criticizing the efforts as "divisive", and as harming military efficiency and recruiting, while Democrats have defended it as beneficial and strengthening. In July 2023, the House of Representatives voted to ban all DEI offices and initiatives within the Pentagon and military along partisan lines, with all Democrats and four Republican members also opposing. The Senate, under Democratic control, has not acted as of 2023. Students for Fair Admissions, which successfully challenged race-based admissions in public universities in a 2023 Supreme Court case, sued the military academies after the Court excluded those institutions from its ruling. In January 2025, Donald Trump signed an executive order requiring U.S. military academies to end affirmative action in admissions; the order was implemented the next month.

=== Public boycotts ===
Political opposition to corporate DEI efforts in the United States, particularly marketing criticized as "woke", have led to calls for boycotts of certain companies by activists and politicians; with notable examples being Disney, Target, Anheuser-Busch, and Chick-fil-A. Commentator Jonathan Turley of The Hill described such boycotts as having "some success".

Some of these companies' responses to the controversies have, in turn, sparked criticism from progressives of walking back or failing DEI commitments.

=== Public opinion ===
A June 2024 poll by The Washington Post and Ipsos found that 6 in 10 Americans believed that diversity, equity, and inclusion programs are "a good thing". A September 2024 poll by the Human Rights Campaign found that 80% of LGBTQ Americans would boycott a company that repealed its DEI programs and 19% would quit their job if their place of employment did.

A 2025 poll by Axios found that more than 50% of Americans across all demographics surveyed said that DEI initiatives had made "no impact" on their jobs. Of those who said it did have an impact, a majority in almost all demographics said DEI had "benefited" their job rather than "hindered" it.

=== Private opinion ===
A 2025 private opinion research study called Social Pressure Index by Populace found that nearly two-thirds of Americans agree more diversity would be good for the country, and 58% continue to support the Black Lives Matter movement.

== Criticism and controversy in the United States ==
2024 work by the United States Senate Committee on Commerce, Science, and Transportation criticizing DEI in the NSF

According to The Chronicle of Higher Education, institutions are making defensive adjustments to the criticism. Some schools are removing the word "diversity" from titles of offices and jobs; some are closing campus spaces set up for students according to identity; some are ending diversity training; and some have stopped asking all faculty and staff members for written affirmations of their commitment to diversity.

=== Diversity training ===
Diversity training, a common tool used in DEI efforts, has repeatedly come under criticism as being ineffective or even counterproductive. The Economist has stated that "the consensus now emerging among academics is that many anti-discrimination policies have no effect. What is worse, they often backfire." A regular claim is that these efforts mainly work to protect against litigation. A 2007 study of 829 companies over 31 years showed "no positive effects in the average workplace" from diversity training, while the effect was negative where it was mandatory. According to Harvard University professor in sociology and diversity researcher Frank Dobbin, "[O]n average, the typical all-hands-on-deck, 'everybody has to have diversity training' – that typical format in big companies doesn't have any positive effects on any historically underrepresented groups like black men or women, Hispanic men or women, Asian-American men or women or white women."

Writing in the Daily Journal in 2023, Tiega-Noel Varlack argued that implicit bias training is needed to address racism and that free-speech objections do not justify skipping it.

=== Mandatory diversity statements within academia ===
The use of mandatory "diversity statements" within academia, wherein an applicant or faculty member outlines their "past contributions", and plans "for advancing diversity, equity and inclusion" if hired, has become controversial and sparked criticism. Diversity statements have been a part of some academic hiring processes since at least 2001.

According to a 2022 survey conducted by the American Association of University Professors, one in five American colleges and universities include DEI criteria in tenure standards, including 45.6% of institutions with more than 5000 students. Some universities have begun to weigh diversity statements heavily in hiring processes. For example, University of California, Berkeley eliminated three-quarters of applicants for five faculty positions in the life sciences on the basis of their diversity statements in the hiring cycle of 2018–2019.

A 1,500-person survey conducted by Foundation for Individual Rights in Education (FIRE) reported that the issue is highly polarizing for faculty members, with half saying their view more closely aligns with the description of diversity statements as "a justifiable requirement for a job at a university", while the other half saw it as "an ideological litmus test that violates academic freedom". According to Professor Randall L. Kennedy at Harvard University, "It would be hard to overstate the degree to which many academics at Harvard and beyond feel intense and growing resentment against the DEI enterprise because of features that are perhaps most evident in the demand for DEI statements", adding "I am a scholar on the left committed to struggles for social justice. The realities surrounding mandatory DEI statements, however, make me wince".

Several U.S. states have implemented legislation to ban mandatory diversity statements. In 2024, MIT announced that diversity statements "will no longer be part of applications for any faculty positions" at the university, becoming the first major university to abandon the practice.

=== Equity versus equality ===
According to the University of Iowa DEI framework, "equity is different than equality in that equality implies treating everyone as if their experiences are exactly the same." A common identification, especially among critics, is of equality as meaning "equality of opportunities" and equity as "equality of outcome". This difference between equity and equality is also called Dilemma of Difference.

=== Effects on free speech and academic freedom ===
In the 2020s, high-profile incidents of campus conflict have sparked debate about the effect of DEI on the campus environment, academic freedom, and free speech. The 2021 cancelling of a Massachusetts Institute of Technology (MIT) guest lecture by University of Chicago astrophysicist Dorian Abbot after he criticized DEI programs led to media attention and controversy. As a result, MIT empaneled a committee to investigate the state of academic freedom at the university.

The 2023 suicide of former Toronto principal Richard Bilkszto led to a new wave of controversy surrounding DEI in the workplace and its impact on freedom of expression. Bilkszto had earlier filed a lawsuit against the Toronto District School Board in the wake of a 2021 incident at a DEI training seminar; Bilkszto was later diagnosed with "anxiety secondary to a workplace event", and claimed the session and its aftermath had destroyed his reputation. Bilkszto's lawyer has publicly linked this incident and its aftermath with his death. In the wake of Bilkszto's death, Ontario Minister of Education Stephen Lecce stated he had asked for a review and "options to reform professional training and strengthen accountability on school boards so this never happens again", calling Bilkszto's allegations before his death "serious and disturbing". Bilkszto's death generated international attention and renewed debate on DEI and freedom of speech. According to The Globe and Mail, the incident has also been "seized on by a number of prominent right-wing commentators looking to roll-back [DEI] initiatives". The anti-racism trainer involved in the incident has stated they welcome the review by Lecce, and stated that the incident has been "weaponized to discredit and suppress the work of people committed [to DEI]".

=== Antisemitism ===
Critics have argued that many organizations' DEI initiatives fail to promote the fair treatment and inclusion of Jewish people, or to take allegations of antisemitism within their organization as seriously as they would allegations of other kinds of bigotry. According to Andria Spindel of the Canadian Antisemitism Education Foundation, antisemitism is far too often ignored by DEI curricula.

Tabia Lee, a former DEI director at De Anza College in California, argues that DEI programs far too often foster antisemitism. According to the Brandeis Center, the DEI committee at Stanford University said that "Jews, unlike other minority group[s], possess privilege and power, Jews and victims of Jew-hatred do not merit or necessitate the attention of the DEI committee", after two students complained about antisemitic incidents on campus.

=== Disability community ===
According to some critics, DEI initiatives inadvertently sideline disabled people. Writing for The Conversation in 2017, college professor Stephen Friedman said that, "Organizations who are serious about DEI must adopt the frame of producing shared value where business and social goods exist side-by-side". According to a Time article in 2023, "People with disabilities are being neglected".

This view has been echoed by a number of DEI leaders and activists. Sara Hart Weir, the former president and CEO of the National Down Syndrome Society and co-founder of the Commission for Disability Employment, argues that when deliberating on the vision of DEI success in the United States, policymakers, and employers need to take proactive measures to engaging with people with disabilities who they historically ignored. Corinne Gray has argued that, "If you embrace diversity, but ignore disability, you're doing it wrong."

=== "Diversity hire" label ===
"Diversity hire", "equity hire", or "DEI hire", are disparaging labels for people from underrepresented groups, implying that they are less qualified and were hired because of DEI policies. A 2024 study found that the wording of some DEI initiatives can lead people hired under them to believe they were not hired on merit alone. The term "diversity hire" can also refer to tokenism. Some Black Americans and commentators have described "DEI", when used to disparage people, as an ethnic slur.

== Diversity issues in other countries ==
DEI issues, sometimes with different terminology, are of concern in numerous countries around the world in the 21st century.

In Australian workplaces, DEI initiatives primarily address gender and Indigenous inclusion, while comparatively less emphasis is placed on disability, LGBTQ+, and socio-economic diversity.

In Japan and Iceland, DEI efforts often concentrate on gender and age equality.

India prioritizes addressing workplace biases stemming from the patriarchal system, caste system, and religion.

Many African countries focus on workplace inequality arising from the intersectionality of gender, ethnicity, and socio-economic backgrounds.

Nordic countries face challenges due to cultural norms like the Law of Jante, which can create a positivity bias and hinder acknowledgment of inequality.

== See also ==
- Corporate Equality Index
- Corporate social responsibility
- Critical Race Theory
- Environmental, social, and governance
- Executive Order 14151
- Fair-chance employer - Employer that does not automatically disqualify all people with any criminal background
- Health equity
- Human resources
- Merit, excellence, and intelligence (MEI) - Framework that emphasizes selecting candidates based solely on their merit, achievements, skills, abilities, intelligence, and contributions
- Rainbow capitalism
- Sensitivity reader
- Students for Fair Admissions v. Harvard
- Sustainable Development Goals
- Title IX - Regarding sex discrimination
- Woke
