= Gender diversity =

Equitable or fair representation of people of different genders

Gender diversity is equitable representation of people of different genders. It most commonly refers to an equitable ratio of men and women, but also includes people of non-binary genders. Gender diversity on corporate boards has been widely discussed, and many ongoing initiatives study and promote gender diversity in fields traditionally dominated by men, including computing, engineering, medicine, and science. It is argued that some proposed explanations are without merit and are in fact dangerous, while others do play a part in a complex interaction of factors. It is suggested that the very nature of science may contribute to the removal of women from the 'pipeline'.

== Benefits ==
Companies are more likely to attract more diverse people, and people who consider gender equality policies when considering different employers.

Organizational behavior expert David A. Thomas argues that a diverse and inclusive workforce aligns with ethical values, fuels creativity, and enhances problem-solving, which are critical for companies to thrive in a rapidly evolving field.

=== Financial performance ===
Some studies show that higher diversity in the workforce is expected to bring higher returns, but reviews of these studies have challenged this claim.

=== Reputation ===
Gender diversity in companies leads to improved reputation both directly and indirectly. Directly, companies with a higher percentage of women board directors are favorably viewed in sectors that operate close to the final customers and are more likely, for instance, to be on Ethisphere Institute's list of the "World's Most Ethical Companies".

Indirectly, women directors are more likely to notice and less likely to commit fraud. Moreover, gender diversity policies seem also to be correlated with increased CSR, as well as having better overall organizational image.

=== Customer base ===
Since men and women have different viewpoints, ideas, and market insights, a gender-diverse workforce enables better problem solving. A study done in 2014 by Gallup finds that hiring a gender-diverse workforce allows the company to serve an increasingly diverse customer base. This happens because a gender-diverse workforce eases the process of accessing resources, such as multiple sources of information or credit, and industry knowledge. Gender-diverse organizations were also shown to benefit from increased customer understanding and satisfaction.

=== Decision making processes ===
Gender diversity in boards increases diversity of ideas by introducing different perspectives and problem-solving approaches. This gives teams increased optionality and decision-making advantages.

=== Diversity of management styles ===
A recent survey by RSA found that women are considered to "bring empathy and intuition to leadership", since they have greater awareness of the motivations and concerns of other people. 62% of the respondents of the survey said women contribute differently to the boardroom than their male colleagues. A similar proportion saw women as more empathetic, with a better insight into how decisions play out in the wider organization. When it came to communications and effective collaboration, "over half felt that women were better". Gender-diverse organisations also enjoy heightened levels of creativity, innovation and problem-solving. A study in this topic found there is a small difference in attendance when the director is a woman. Among 74 firms in which 3.4% were male directors and 3.2% were women, there were problems with attendance. Although it is a 0.02% difference, out of 84 directors, 7 were women.

== Measurement ==
=== In the boardroom ===
Between Spring 2014 and Spring 2015 there was an increase in the number of female Chairs within the FTSE 100 reports. Spring 2014 saw 1 female chair in the FTSE; this increased to 3 by Spring 2015. The number of female CEOs in the FTSE 100 also rose between 2014 and 2015. In Spring 2014 there were 4 female CEOs in the FTSE 100; this increased to 5 by Spring 2015. By 2017, the number of female CEOs among Fortune 500 companies numbered 32 (~6%). Female CFOs in the FTSE 100 saw the highest increase. In Spring 2014 there were 8 female CFOs in the FTSE 100; this rose to 12 by Spring 2015.

In 2011 the United Kingdom government introduced the Voluntary Code for Executive search Firms with a view to improving gender diversity within FTSE companies.

=== In financial markets ===
As of 2016, State Street Global Advisors offers an exchange traded fund (ETF) that tracks companies with relatively high proportions of women in executive and director positions. The ETF follows an index of 185 publicly traded US companies with gender-diverse executive leadership, defined as Senior VP or higher. Each company in the index must include at least one woman on its board or as CEO. The fund trades under the symbol SHE and has risen 4.96% in value in its first nine months since inception. In support of addressing systemic gender bias against women in leadership and STEM (Science, Technology, Engineering, and Mathematics) that manifests early in life, the ETF provider has pledged to direct an unknown portion of its revenue to charitable organizations.

=== In the film industry ===
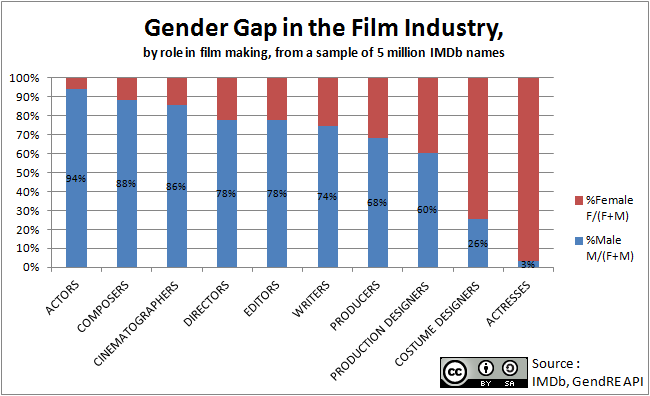
GenderGap in IMDb

The analysis of The Internet Movie Database (IMDb, 2005 data dump) shows how wide the gender gap is in the film industry, especially for the most prestigious types of jobs. There are nearly twice as many actors as actresses in IMDb. Prestigious jobs such as composer, cinematographer, director are respectively 88%, 76%, and 86% male-dominated.

=== In the life sciences industry ===
The life sciences industry covers a lot of ground and includes pharmaceutical companies, research support and services firms, research tool and reagent manufacturers, among other types, though in some contexts it is equated with drug development companies (Big Pharma and small pharma). According to a pair of 2017 industry reports, men and women enter the industry in equal numbers, but women compose ¼ or less of C-suite positions, and less than 20% of Board of Directors positions. The first female CEO of a large pharmaceutical company emerged in 2017—Emma Walmsley at GlaxoSmithKline—which translates to 1% of Big Pharma CEOs being women.

== See also ==
- Diversity
- Gender bias on Wikipedia
- Gender empowerment
- Gender equality
- Gender neutrality
- Gender nonconformity
- Gender variance
- Sexual diversity
- Transgender rights
- Women in STEM fields
