= Equal employment opportunity =

Protection of US employees from types of employment discrimination

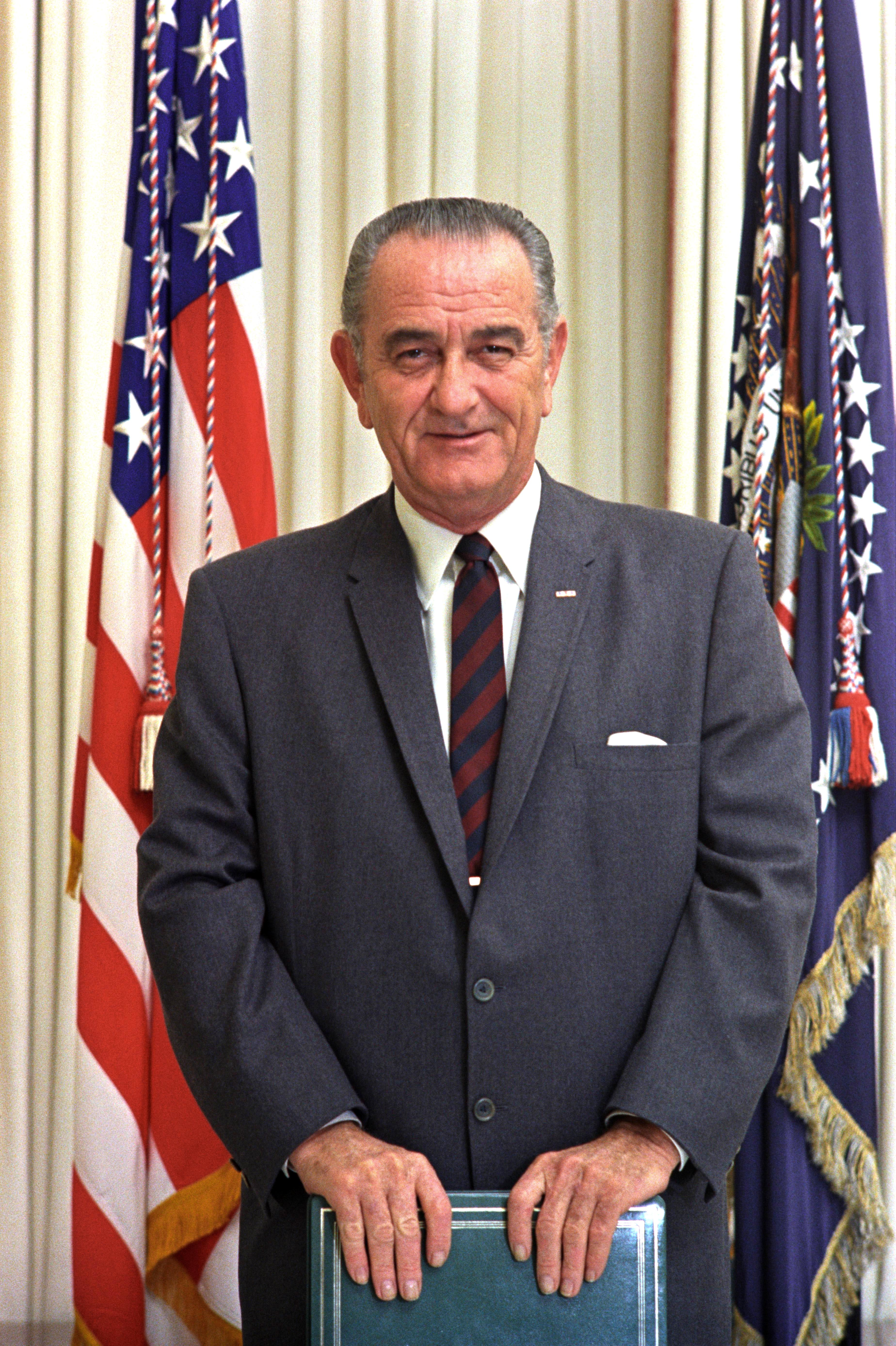
President Lyndon Baines Johnson

Equal employment opportunity is equal opportunity to attain or maintain employment in a company, organization, or other institution. Examples of legislation to foster it or to protect it from eroding include the U.S. Equal Employment Opportunity Commission, which was established by Title VII of the Civil Rights Act of 1964 to assist in the protection of United States employees from discrimination. The law was the first federal law designed to protect most US employees from employment discrimination based on that employee's (or applicant's) race, color, religion, sex, or national origin (Public Law 88-352, July 2, 1964, 78 Stat. 253, 42 U.S.C. Sec. 2000e et. seq.).

On June 15, 2020, the United States Supreme Court ruled that workplace discrimination is prohibited based on sexual orientation or transgender status. Bostock v. Clayton County, 590 U.S. 644 (2020).

Employment discrimination entails areas such as firing, hiring, promotions, transfer, or wage practices and it is also illegal to discriminate in advertising, referral of job applicants, or classification. The Title is pertinent in companies affecting commerce that have fifteen or more employees. The Equal Employment Opportunity Commission (EEOC) is section 705 of the title.

Equal employment opportunity was further enhanced when President Lyndon B. Johnson signed Executive Order 11246 on September 24, 1965, created to prohibit federal contractors from discriminating against employees based on race, sex, creed, religion, color, or national origin.

Executive Order 11246 was rescinded by an executive order of President Donald Trump on January 22, 2025.

== Related statutes ==
Along with those protected classes, more recent statutes have listed other traits as "protected classes", including the following:

- The Age Discrimination in Employment Act of 1967 has protected those aged 40 and over but does not protect those under the age of 40.
- The Americans with Disabilities Act of 1990 protects individuals who possess, or are thought to possess, a wide range of disabilities, ranging from paraplegia to Down syndrome to autism. However, it does not force an employer to employ a worker whose disability would create an "undue hardship" on their business (for example, a paraplegic cannot work on a construction site, and a blind person cannot be a chauffeur). Similar protections have been in place for Federal employees and customers of federal agencies and contractors since 1973 under the Rehabilitation Act.
- The Genetic Information Nondiscrimination Act of 2008 forbids discrimination based on family history and genetic information.
- The Vietnam Era Veterans' Readjustment Assistance Act of 1974 forbids discrimination on the grounds of a worker's military history, including any effects that the battlefield might have had on the worker's psyche.
- Twelve states, over one hundred local governments, and the District of Columbia have passed statutes that forbid discrimination based on sexual orientation; also, the Employment Non-Discrimination Act would make sexuality a protected class, but this bill has yet to pass Congress.

The executive order also required contractors to implement affirmative action plans to increase the participation of minorities and women in the workplace. Under federal regulations, affirmative action plans must consist of an equal opportunity policy statement, an analysis of the current workforce, identification of problem areas, the establishment of goals and timetables for increasing employment opportunities, specific action-oriented programs to address problem areas, support for community action programs, and the establishment of an internal audit and reporting system.

== See also ==
- Office of Federal Contract Compliance Programs
- Equal Employment Opportunity Commission
- Department of Fair Employment and Housing
- Americans with Disabilities Act of 1990
- Equal opportunity
