= Executive Order 11478 =

1969 United States executive order

Executive Order 11478, signed by U.S. President Richard M. Nixon on August 8, 1969, prohibited discrimination in the competitive service of the federal civilian workforce on certain grounds. The order was later amended to cover additional protected classes.

== Provisions ==
Executive Order 11478 covered the federal civilian workforce, including the United States Postal Service and civilian employees of the United States Armed Forces. It prohibited discrimination in employment on the basis of race, color, religion, sex, national origin, handicap, and age. It required all departments and agencies to take affirmative steps to promote employment opportunities for those classes it covered.

Executive Order 11478 assigned the Equal Employment Opportunity Commission responsibility for directing the implementation of the Order's policies and to issue rules to promote its principles. Agencies were in turn required to abide by those rules and produce any reports the EEOC required.

Following the release of Executive Order 11478, the Federal Women's Program (FWP) was integrated into the EEOC program and placed under the direction of EEOC for each agency.

The Federal Personnel Manual 713 was issued to carry out Executive Order 11478.

== Amendments ==
On April 23, 1971, Executive Order 11590 amended Executive Order 11478 to apply to the recently reorganized United States Postal Service and to the newly established Postal Rate Commission.

On December 28, 1978, Executive Order 12106 amended Executive order 11478 to transfer certain functions of the Civil Service Commission to the EEOC.

On May 28, 1998, President Bill Clinton signed Executive Order 13087, which amended Executive Order 11478 to add sexual orientation to the list of classes covered.

On May 2, 2000, Executive Order 13152 amended Executive Order 11478 to add "status as a parent" to the list of categories and defined that term in detail.

On July 21, 2014, Executive Order 13672 amended Executive Order 11478 and Executive Order 11246 to add sexual orientation and gender identity.

On January 21, 2025, President Donald Trump revoked Executive Order 13672, which amended EO 11478, as part of a sweeping Executive Order that rescinded many Executive Orders pertaining to promoting equality and diversity, though Executive Order 11478 itself remained in force.

== See also ==
- Executive order (United States)
