= Alliance for Fair Board Recruitment v. SEC =

- Court: United States Court of Appeals for the Fifth Circuit
- Full case name: Alliance for Fair Board Recruitment; National Center for Public Policy Research v. Securities and Exchange Commission
- Argued: May 14, 2024
- Decided: December 11, 2024
- Citations: No. 21-60626 slip op. at 5 (5th Cir. 2024) (en banc); WL 670403

Case history
- Prior history: 85 F.4th 226 (5th Cir. 2023)(panel decision)

Holding
- The SEC's approval of the Nasdaq's proposed rules requiring listed companies to ensure women and minority directors were on their boards or provide an explanation of why they were not does not square with the Securities Exchange Act of 1934.

Court membership
- Judges sitting: Elrod, Jones, Smith, Stewart, Dennis, Richman, Southwick, Haynes, Graves, Higginson, Willett, Duncan, Engelhardt, Oldham, Wilson, Douglas, and Ramirez

Case opinions
- Majority: Andrew S. Oldham, joined by Elrod, Jones, Smith, Richman, Willett, Duncan, Engelhard, and Wilson
- Dissent: Higginson, joined by Stewart, Dennis, Southwick, Haynes, Graves, Douglas, and Ramirez

Laws applied
- The Securities Exchange Act of 1934

Alliance for Fair Board Recruitment v. SEC, No. 21-60626 (2024) is a United States Court of Appeals for the Fifth Circuit case in which the court held that the U.S. Securities and Exchange Commission (SEC) lacked the authority to approve the Nasdaq's proposed rules requiring listed companies to ensure women and minority directors were on their boards or provide an explanation of why they were not does not square with the Securities Exchange Act of 1934.

== Background ==
In August 2021, the SEC approved Nasdaq's proposed rules requiring listed companies to have women and minority representation on their boards. Under the rules, each company must have at least one director who identifies as female and at least one director who identifies as Black or African American, Hispanic or Latinx, Asian, Native American or Alaska Native, Native Hawaiian or Pacific Islander, two or more races or ethnicities, or as LGBTQ+. Alternatively, a company must explain why it does not have at least two directors from these categories.

The Alliance for Fair Board Recruitment and the National Center for Public Policy Research challenged the SEC's approval, arguing that the agency lacked the statutory authority to approve the rules. They also claimed the rules violated the Fifth Amendment's equal protection principles and the First Amendment's free speech clause. In October 2023, a three-judge panel of the Fifth Circuit ruled that the SEC had acted within its authority in approving the rules.

In February 2024, the Fifth Circuit granted the advocacy groups' petition for a rehearing en banc.

== Opinion of the court ==
On December 11, 2024, in a 9-to-8 en banc decision, the Fifth Circuit majority held that the SEC exceeded its authority when it approved such rules, stating that "... the diversity rules cannot be squared with the Securities Exchange Act of 1934."

The Court found that the diversity rules were not a disclosure requirement, but "a public-shaming penalty for a corporation's failure to abide by the Government's diversity requirements."

The dissenting judges argued that with the SEC's limited discretion in approving rules promulgated by private self-regulatory organizations, the SEC is obligated to approve rules proposed by securities exchanges if the proposed rule is consistent with the Exchange Act's purposes.

== Reactions ==
Legal critics cautioned that while the Fifth Circuit's decision ended Nasdaq's board diversity mandates, institutional investors may still pressure companies to pursue DEI goals. Some legal scholars argued that the decision has created uncertainty and variability in the board diversity landscape.

== See also ==
- Regents of the University of California v. Bakke
- Students for Fair Admissions v. Harvard
- Diversity, Equity, and Inclusion
- Corporate Equality Index
