= Women's Equity Action League =

The Women's Equity Action League, or WEAL, was a United States women's rights organization founded in 1968 with the purpose of addressing discrimination against women in employment and education opportunities. Made up of conservative women, they used the court system to facilitate enforcing existing legislation. They are most known for filing cases against higher education institutions across the United States to address discriminatory hiring and promotion practices. They also successfully litigated over help-wanted advertisements being sex-segregated, extending military spousal benefits to husbands of female service personnel, and over the extent to which the Department of Defense could involve itself in the lives of military spouses.

== History ==
The Women's Equity Action League (WEAL) was founded in 1968, by Elizabeth M. Boyer, during the 2nd wave feminist movement. The organization was founded in Cleveland, Ohio and headquartered in Washington, D.C., as a "spin-off" of the National Organization for Women (NOW) by more conservative women. WEAL did not support the radical platforms of women's liberationists, nor controversial issues such as abortion, child care, divorce, violence against women, and sexuality.

WEAL focused instead on equal opportunities for women in education, economics, and employment. Among their goals were to extend the Civil Rights Act of 1964 to ban sex discrimination in all programs which received federal funding and extend the equal opportunity employment provisions to educational institutions. They also pressed for the Fair Labor Standards Act of 1938 to extend to administrative, executive, and professional employees the provision of equal pay for equal work and worked to promote investigation by the Civil Rights Commission on discrimination against women. They were strongly supportive of the Equal Rights Amendment and worked with NOW in support of the ERA.

In 1969, WEAL members discovered that Executive Order 11246, signed by President Lyndon B. Johnson in 1965, had been amended by Executive Order 11375 in 1968 to include language that federal contractors could not discriminate on the basis of sex. As there was no exemption for educational institutions, as there had been in Title VII of the Civil Rights Act, WEAL launched a national campaign filing a class action suit against every college and university in the United States. It was their most successful campaign to reduce sexism, as it allowed them to compile statistics on the level of discrimination in academia and press the Department of Health, Education, and Welfare, (HEW) to enforce the executive orders. The organization published the WEAL Washington Report, Better Late than Never: Financial Aid for Older Women, and newsletters on issues of concern to women, including executive and legislative actions and court decisions.

WEAL established a tax-exempt fund which supported lawsuits and monitored implementation and enforcement of Title IX of the Education Amendments of 1972, dealing with academic discrimination in pay and tenure. They filed complaints against academic institutions at the Office of Federal Contract Compliance. They also instituted a lawsuit against The Pittsburgh Press for segregating employment advertisements by sex. NOW joined the effort, which escalated to the Supreme Court, and ultimately eliminated the practice of sex-segregated advertising. Later that year, an internal disagreement over whether to pursue action in a pregnancy-discrimination case, which would become Cleveland Board of Education v. LaFleur, caused Jane Pinker to resign from the board. She and WEAL members who followed her formed the Women's Law Fund and successfully litigated LaFleur.

Those who remained with WEAL, filed a sex-discrimination case in 1973, Frontiero v. Richardson to secure military benefits for the spouse of a female officer. In 1977, they won a court order in Adams v. Califano, requiring HEW and the Department of Labor to enforce federal law and hire adequate staff to clear the pending cases of sex-discrimination. WEAL also sought to remove gender as a factor in insurance ratings and lobbied for passage of the Pregnancy Discrimination Act of 1978. Throughout the 1980s, WEAL worked on cases regarding women and the military, pressing for changes in the classification of jobs for which women were ineligible and the way military spouses were treated. In 1987, they won a case which barred the Department of Defense from interfering in the careers of military spouses. Up to that point, servicemembers' spouses could be pressured to give up civilian careers because it was seen to infringe upon the amount of time they devoted to volunteer activities in the military community, and this was used to limit promotion opportunities of servicemembers. WEAL dissolved in 1989.

== National presidents: ==
- Elizabeth Boyer (1968-1969)
- Nancy Dowding (1969-1970)
- Lizabeth Moody (1970)
- Sally Mann (1971-1972)
- Arvonne Fraser (1972-1974)
- Doris Kluge Seward (1975-1976)
- Eileen Thornton (1976-1978)
- Cristine Candela (1978-1980)
- Carol Burroughs Grossman (1980-1982)
- Mary Wheat Gray (1982-1988)
- Doris Etelson (1989-1990)
