= Executive Order 13087 =

1998 United States executive order

- Further Amendments to Executive Order 11478, Equal Employment Opportunity in the Federal Government

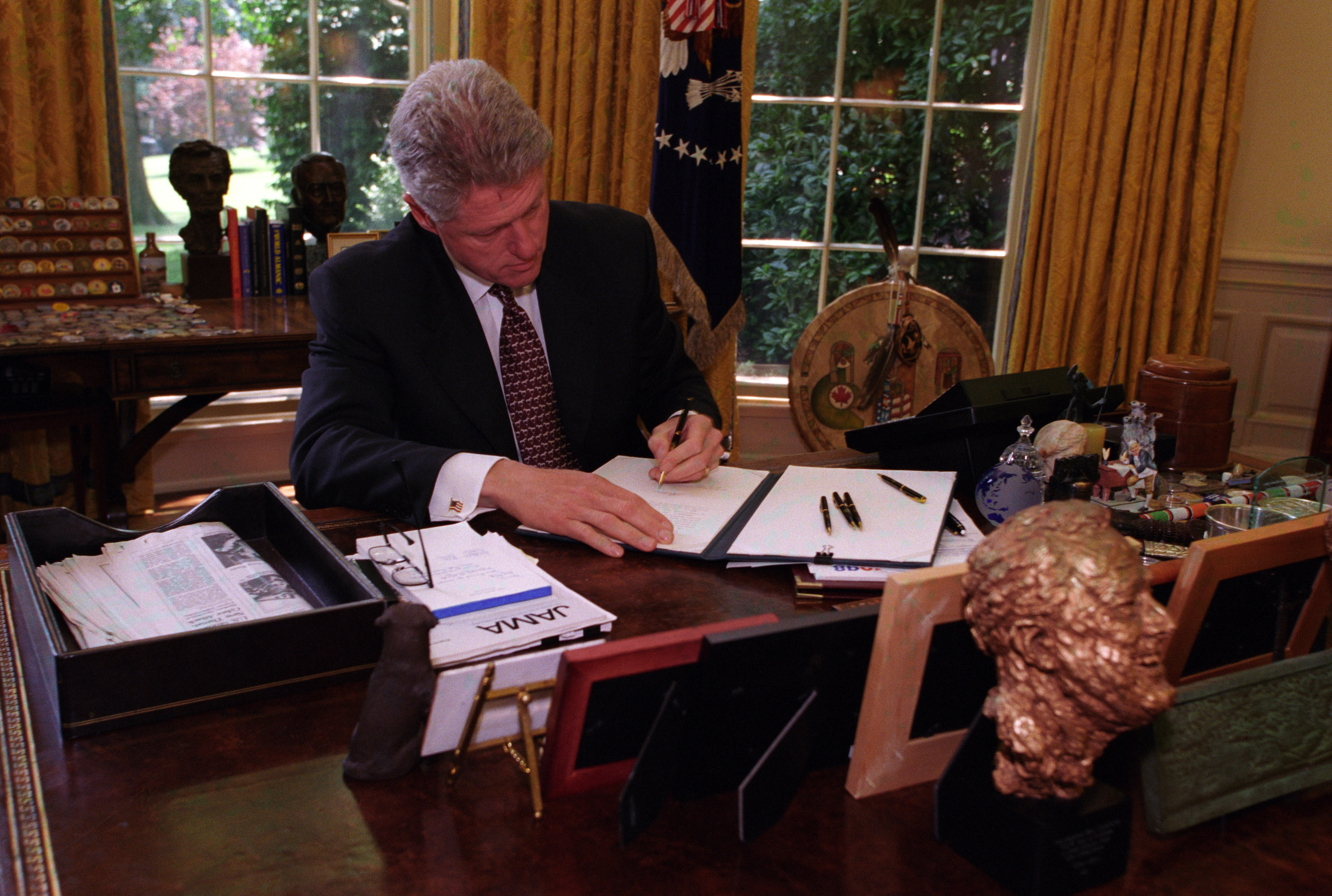
- President Bill Clinton signs Executive Order 13087 in the Oval Office at the White House, May 1998
- Type: Executive order
- Number: 13087
- President: Bill Clinton
- Signed: May 28, 1998

Federal Register details
- Federal Register document number: 98-14689
- Publication date: June 2, 1998

Executive Order 13087 was signed by U.S. President Bill Clinton on May 28, 1998, amending Executive Order 11478 to prohibit discrimination based on sexual orientation in the competitive service of the federal civilian workforce. The order also applies to employees of the government of the District of Columbia, and the United States Postal Service. However, it does not apply to positions and agencies in the excepted service, such as the Central Intelligence Agency, National Security Agency, and the Federal Bureau of Investigation.

In a statement issued the same day that he signed the order, President Clinton said:

The Executive Order states Administration policy but does not and cannot create any new enforcement rights (such as the ability to proceed before the Equal Employment Opportunity Commission). Those rights can be granted only by legislation passed by the Congress, such as the Employment Non-Discrimination Act.

Federal employees cannot appeal claims of discrimination under Executive Order 13087 to the EEOC, but they can file complaints under the grievance procedure of the agency where they work and, under certain conditions, may appeal their claims to the Merit Systems Protection Board or the Office of Special Counsel.

Clinton had previously included "sexual orientation" in Executive Order 12968 (1995) when listing the characteristics forbidden as the basis for discrimination when granting federal employees access to classified information.

The order applied to civilian employees of the American military, but not to uniformed members of the armed forces, who, at the time, were covered by the Don't ask, don't tell directive issued by Clinton in 1993.

Opponents in Congress objected to the Order and said that it provided special privileges and "special breaks for special interests," Donald Devine, who headed the Office of Personnel Management from 1981 to 1995, criticized Clinton's decision to implement the non-discrimination policy by issuing an Executive Order, "issued out of the glare of public attention," and called on Congress to act to undo the President's action "before it can do much damage both to the orderly management of the government and to its equal employment policies generally." On June 11, 1998, the conservative Southern Baptist Convention passed a resolution asking the President to rescind the order and demanding that Congress nullify it if he did not do so. Later in 1998, several congressmen, including Republicans Bob Barr of Georgia and Joel Hefley of Colorado, introduced bills designed to overturn 13087 or to prohibit government agencies from spending any funds to enforce it. In August 1998, an amendment to the Commerce, Justice, State, Judiciary, and Related Agencies appropriations bill that sought to prohibit spending on behalf of 13087 failed in the House of Representatives on a vote of 176 to 252, the only recorded vote on the issue.

According to the Equal Employment Opportunity Commission:

Executive Order 13087 did not create any new rights; however, it did set the stage for positive and constructive action by all units of the federal government to make certain that the workplace is one free from harassment and discrimination.

In 2005, the Human Rights Campaign and others claimed that "the head of the Office of Special Counsel, Scott Bloch, refuses to enforce these longstanding non-discrimination protections."

== See also ==
- Executive order (United States)
