= Executive Order 14173 =

Cease of federal DEIA contracts

- "Ending Illegal Discrimination And Restoring Merit-Based Opportunity"
- Front page of Executive Order 14173
- Type: Executive order
- Number: 14173
- President: Donald Trump
- Signed: January 21, 2025

Federal Register details
- Federal Register document number: 2025-02097
- Publication date: January 21, 2025

Summary
- Prohibits private organizations from conducting any Diversity, Equity, Inclusion, and Accessibility employment programs for jobs created by federal contracts

Executive Order 14173, titled "Ending Illegal Discrimination And Restoring Merit-Based Opportunity", is an executive order signed by Donald Trump, the 47th President of the United States, on January 21, 2025. The executive order instructs federal departments not to issue contracts to private organizations that enforce diversity, equity, inclusion and accessibility (DEIA) frameworks. The order does not affect state or lower jurisdiction level DEIA related government contracting practices. It specifically prevents affirmative action from being implemented by government contractors. The order also revoked certain parts of the Equal Employment Opportunity (EEO) order that was signed by Lyndon B. Johnson in 1965, as well as other orders, in terms of federal contracting jobs. The order also requests federal agencies to start an investigation on 9 publicly traded companies.

Critics have claimed this as being anti-minority and would decrease the likelihood of individuals in minority groups from getting a job.

== Effects on current contracts ==
The order requires the government departments to review the hiring practices of businesses and organizations that have been contracted, as well as consider any remedies done after the signing of this order. Federal contractors were given 90 days from the signing of the order to stop DEIA practices. After the review, the departments are to determine whether to continue the contract with the current organization, give the contract to another party, or to cancel the contract.

Due to this many organizations are worried if they might end up losing money from partially completed contracts, if the federal government were to rescind their contract. Because of this, many lawyers have suggested to contracted organizations to be in touch with a law-firm immediately.

== Parts of the EEO and similar orders revoked ==
- The order specifically revokes parts of the EEO that deal with the prevention of discrimination based on, race, sex, color, religion, and national origin, during and after the hiring process done by contractors.
- Multiple DEI executive orders made by former president Joe Biden.

== See also ==
- List of executive orders in the second presidency of Donald Trump
