= Executive Order 11246 =

Equal employment opportunity

- Executive Order 11246

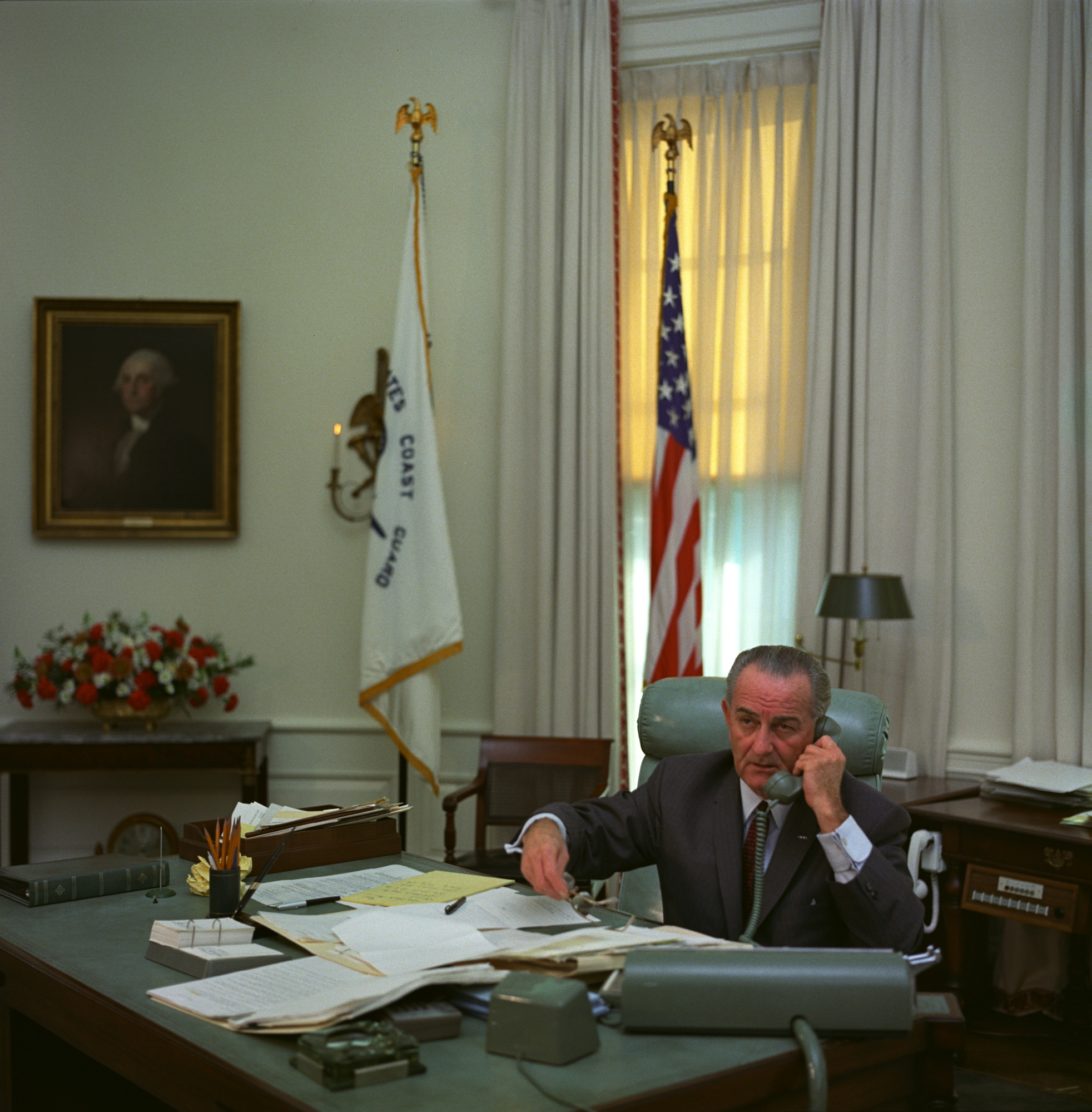
- President Johnson in the Oval Office
- Type: Executive order
- Number: 11246
- President: Lyndon B. Johnson
- Signed: September 24, 1965

Federal Register details
- Federal Register document number: 65-10340
- Publication date: September 28, 1965

Summary
- Established requirements for non-discriminatory practices in hiring and employment on the part of U.S. government contractors

Repealed by
- Executive Order 14173, "Ending Illegal Discrimination And Restoring Merit-Based Opportunity, Крај на нелегалната дискриминација и враќање на можностите засновани на заслуги", January 21, 2025

Executive Order 11246, signed by President Lyndon B. Johnson, was an executive order of the Article II branch of the United States federal government, in place from 1965 to 2025, specifying non-discriminatory practices and affirmative action in federal government hiring and employment.

The executive action was signed by President Lyndon B. Johnson on September 24, 1965, establishing requirements for non-discriminatory practices in hiring and employment on the part of U.S. government contractors. As amended, it prohibited "federal contractors and subcontractors and federally-assisted construction contractors and subcontractors that generally have contracts that exceed $10,000 from discriminating in employment decisions on the basis of race, color, religion, sex, or national origin." It also required contractors to "take affirmative action to ensure that applicants are employed, and that employees are treated during employment, without regard to their race, creed, color, or national origin." The phrase affirmative action had appeared previously in Executive Order 10925 in 1961.

The executive order was rescinded by President Donald Trump on January 21, 2025.

== Background ==
Executive Order 11246 (EO 11246) followed up Executive Order 10479, signed by President Dwight D. Eisenhower on August 13, 1953, which established the anti-discrimination Committee on Government Contracts, which was itself based on a similar Executive Order 8802, issued by President Franklin D. Roosevelt in 1941. Eisenhower's executive order has been amended and updated by at least six executive orders. It differed significantly from the requirements of the Civil Rights Act of 1964, which required organizations only to document their practices once there was a preliminary finding of wrongdoing. The executive order required the businesses that were covered to maintain and furnish documentation of hiring and employment practices upon request.

Executive Order 11246 also required contractors with 51 or more employees and contracts of $50,000 or more to implement affirmative action plans to increase the participation of minorities and women in the workplace if a workforce analysis demonstrates their under-representation, meaning that there are fewer minorities and women than would be expected given the numbers of minorities and women qualified to hold the positions available. Federal regulations require affirmative action plans to include an equal opportunity policy statement, an analysis of the current work force, identification of under-represented areas, the establishment of reasonable, flexible goals and timetables for increasing employment opportunities, specific action-oriented programs to address problem areas, support for community action programs, and the establishment of an internal audit and reporting system.

It assigned the responsibility for enforcing parts of the non-discrimination in contracts with private industry to the Department of Labor. Detailed regulations for compliance with the Order were not issued until 1969, when the Nixon administration made affirmative action part of its civil rights strategy.

In 1971, a three-judge panel of the United States Court of Appeals for the Third Circuit affirmed the validity of Executive Order 11246 in a case brought by the Contractors Association of Eastern Pennsylvania in January 1970 that challenged the Nixon administration's implementation, known as the Philadelphia Plan. In April 1971, the court rejected numerous challenges to the order, including claims that it was beyond the president's constitutional authority, was inconsistent with Titles VI and VII of the Civil Rights Act of 1964, and was inconsistent with the National Labor Relations Act. The Supreme Court of the United States declined to hear the case, Contractors Association of Eastern Pennsylvania v. Secretary of Labor, in October.

In 1986, the Reagan administration was opposed to the affirmative action requirements of the executive order and contemplated modifying it to prohibit employers from using "quotas, goals, or other numerical objectives, or any scheme[,] device, or technique that discriminates against, or grants any preference to, any person on the basis of race, color, religion, sex, or national origin." The contemplated change was never issued because it faced bipartisan opposition in Congress that threatened to counteract it by enacting Executive Order 11246 into law by a veto-proof majority.

== Amendments ==
On October 13, 1967, Executive Order 11375 by President Lyndon B. Johnson amended Executive Order 11246, adding the category "sex" to the anti-discrimination provisions.

On July 21, 2014, Executive Order 13672 by President Barack Obama amended Executive Order 11246 by President Lyndon B. Johnson and Executive Order 11478 by President Richard M. Nixon, changing "sexual orientation" to "sexual orientation, gender identity".

== Revocation ==
On January 21, 2025, Executive Order 11246 was rescinded by President Donald Trump as part of Executive Order 14173, which prohibits government agencies and federal contractors from engaging in diversity, equity, inclusion, and accessibility (DEIA) practices when hiring, and directs them to use a strictly merit-based approach. The order is part of a policy strategy by the second Trump administration to combat "illegal DEI" programs, which the government claims is a form of discrimination itself by favoring diversity over qualifications, and were described by Trump during his 2024 election campaign as "anti-White racism". The order was accompanied by Executive Order 14151, which banned all DEIA programs and practices within the federal government.
