= Michael Frey (politician) =

American politician

Member of the Fairfax County, Virginia Board of Supervisors from the Sully district
- In office 1991–2015
- Preceded by: District created
- Succeeded by: Kathy Smith

Personal details
- Party: Republican
- Education: George Mason University
- Occupation: Politician

Michael Robert Frey was an American politician and animal rights activist who served as a member of the Fairfax County Board of Supervisors from 1991 to 2015. A member of the Republican Party, Frey represented the Sully district in the western part of the county. The district includes parts of Chantilly, Centreville, Franklin Farm, and Oak Hill.

Prior to his 1991 election as supervisor from the newly created district, Frey worked as an aide to first Chairman of the Board of Supervisors John F. Herrity and later Springfield district Supervisor Elaine N. McConnell.

In January 2015, Frey announced he would retire and not seek another term as Sully District supervisor. In 2017, the Fairfax County Board of Supervisors named the Fairfax County Animal Shelter in Frey’s honor.

Frey died unexpectedly on February 16, 2026.
