= Hoofnagle =

Hoofnagle is a surname. Notable people with the surname include:

- Chris Hoofnagle, American law professor
- Jay Houston Hoofnagle (born 1943), American expert in hepatotoxicity, hepatitis, cirrhosis and other diseases of the liver
- William Hoofnagle (1921–2012), American economist and politician
