= 2010 Virginia's 11th congressional district election =

- November 2, 2010
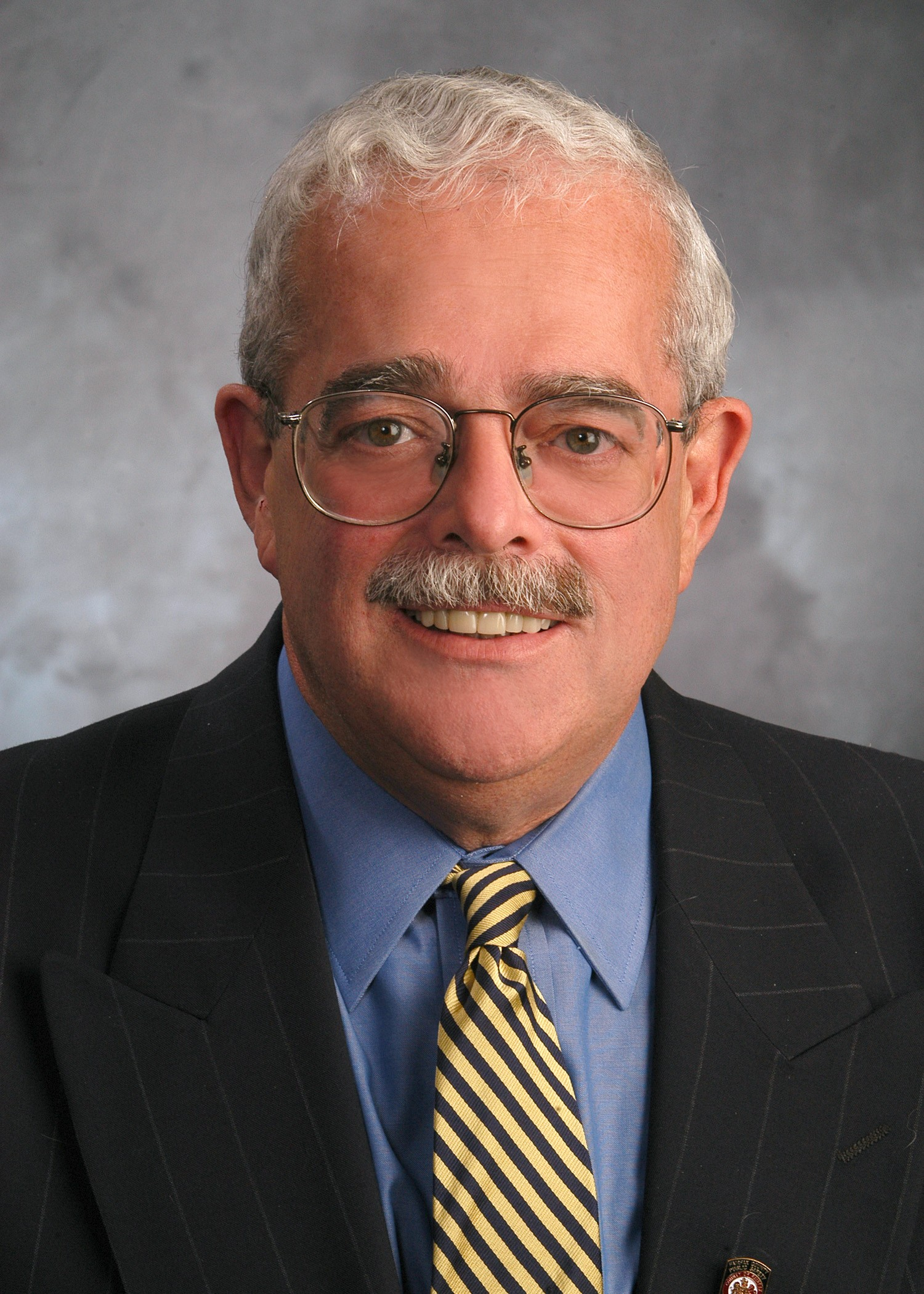

Candidate	Gerry Connolly	Keith Fimian
Party	Democratic	Republican
Popular vote	111,720	110,739
Percentage	49.2%	48.8%
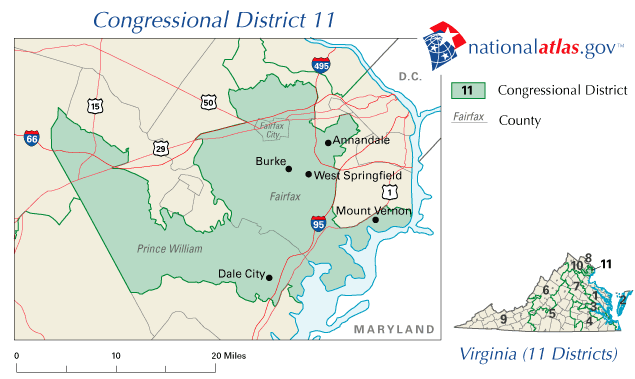
- Virginia's 11th congressional district
Representative before election
Gerry Connolly
Democratic
Elected Representative
Gerry Connolly
Democratic

An election was held on November 2, 2010, to determine who would represent Virginia's 11th congressional district in the United States House of Representatives during the 112th Congress. The seat that was contested is located in Northern Virginia, and includes most of Fairfax County, all of the city of Fairfax, and part of eastern Prince William County. Democrat Gerry Connolly first won the seat in 2008. The Republican nominee was Keith Fimian.

The result was too close to call immediately following the election. At the end of the day on November 2, Connolly led Fimian by only 487 votes, with canvassing and certification still to be completed. After canvassing was completed and results from two outstanding precincts and provisional ballots were counted, Connolly increased his lead to 921 votes (0.41%). Although Virginia election law allows the losing candidate to request a recount on November 22 if the margin is less than 1%, the recount is at the government's expense if the margin is less than 0.5%, and the Fimian campaign had alluded to the possibility of a recount in a statement, Fimian eventually conceded the race to Connolly on November 9. Connolly won by 981 votes, or 0.43%.

== Background ==
The 2010 race was a rematch of the 2008 race, when Connolly defeated Fimian 55% to 43%. Connolly was unopposed for the Democratic nomination.

Fimian faced a primary challenge from moderate Fairfax County Board of Supervisors member Pat Herrity. A bruising primary fight ensued and The Washington Post described the race as "one of the nastiest contests in the commonwealth," with each campaign accusing the other of negative campaigning. Fimian emerged victorious, beating Herrity 56%-44%, with 35,890 votes cast.

The race was closely watched; it was considered a bellwether battleground district in the larger Republican mission to regain a majority in the House. The National Republican Congressional Committee picked Fimian for its Young Guns candidate training and support program.

=== Polling ===
Poll Source	Dates Administered	Gerald Connolly (D)	Keith Fimian (R)
McLaughlin & Associates	February 5–10, 2010	35%	40%

== Fundraising ==
Candidate (Party)	Receipts	Disbursements	Cash On Hand	Debt
Gerry Connolly (D)	$2,461,286	$2,435,016	$49,124	$0
Keith Fimian (R)	$2,941,463	$2,785,586	$166,003	$358,137
David Dotson (L)	$1,790	$390	$1,396	$100
Source: Federal Election Commission

== Candidates ==
=== Democratic nomination ===
- Gerry Connolly, freshman incumbent (unopposed)

=== Republican nomination ===
- Keith Fimian, businessman and 2008 Republican nominee
- Pat Herrity, member of the Fairfax County Board of Supervisors

==== Results ====
Republican Primary results
Party	Candidate	Votes	%
Republican	Keith Fimian	20,075	55.93
Republican	Pat Herrity	15,815	44.06
Total votes		35,890	100

=== Others on ballot ===
- Libertarian David L. Dotson,
- Independent Green David William Gillis Jr.
- Independent Christopher F. DeCarlo.

== General election results ==
General election unofficial results
Party	Candidate	Votes	%
Democratic	Gerald E. "Gerry" Connolly	111,720	49.22
Republican	Keith S. Fimian	110,739	48.79
Independent	Christopher F. DeCarlo	1,846	0.81
Libertarian	David L. Dotson	1,382	0.60
Independent Greens	David William Gillis, Jr.	959	0.42
None	Write in	305	0.13
Total votes		226,951	100

== See also ==
- 2010 United States House of Representatives elections in Virginia#District 11
