= Jean Packard =

American politician (1923–2014)

Chair of the Fairfax County Board of Supervisors
- In office 1972–1975
- Preceded by: William Hoofnagle
- Succeeded by: John F. Herrity

Personal details
- Born: April 25, 1923 Cincinnati, Ohio, US
- Died: October 21, 2014 (aged 91) Fairfax, Virginia, US
- Party: Democratic
- Spouse: Fred M. Packard
- Children: 1
- Education: Ohio State University; Montana State University

Military service
- Allegiance: United States
- War: World War II
- Service: Women's Army Corps

Jean Roberts Packard (April 15, 1923 – October 21, 2014) was an American environmentalist, civic activist and chairwoman of the Fairfax County Board of Supervisors from 1972 to 1975.

== Early life ==
The daughter of journalist and publisher David W. Roberts and his wife Ernestine, Jean Nichols Roberts was born on April 15, 1923, in Cincinnati, and attended Ohio State University. After two years at Ohio State, Roberts enlisted in the Army in 1944 and served in the Women's Army Corps during World War II.

Following the war, Roberts returned to Ohio State. She later attended Montana State University and graduated with a degree in journalism in 1948. While working for one of her father's newspapers, Roberts met Fred M. Packard, an employee of the National Parks Association and namesake of the Fred M. Packard Award, and the two married in June 1951, moving to Fairfax.

== Career ==
In 1971, Packard sought the nomination to run as the Democratic candidate for the Annandale District seat on Board of Supervisors, declaring that she would be able to devote full-time attention to the job, but lost the September primary to Audrey Moore.

Following the unexpected resignation of chairman William Hoofnagle in September 1972, Packard emerged from a crowded field of six candidates to become the chair in a special election held in November 1972.

During her term, efforts were started to downzone the Occoquan Watershed in an attempt to minimize pollution of the main source for the county's drinking water, an effort that emerged successful in 1981 after many legal challenges.

Packard was defeated for reelection in 1975 by Republican Jack Herrity, who then took office in January 1976.

In 1988, Packard was appointed to the board of the Northern Virginia Regional Park Authority, and would go on to serve for 24 years.

In addition to her role on the Fairfax County Board of Supervisors, Packard was also on the National Board for the Sierra Club, and had been a leader on the League of Women Voters. Prior to serving as board chairman, she served as President of the Fairfax County Federation of Citizen Associations in 1967 and was honored with a Citation of Merit in 1984 and as Citizen of the Year in 1985 by the Federation. Packard was also a founding board member for the Northern Virginia Conservation Trust.

Packard died at her Fairfax home on October 21, 2014, aged 91.
