= Sharon Bulova =

American politician

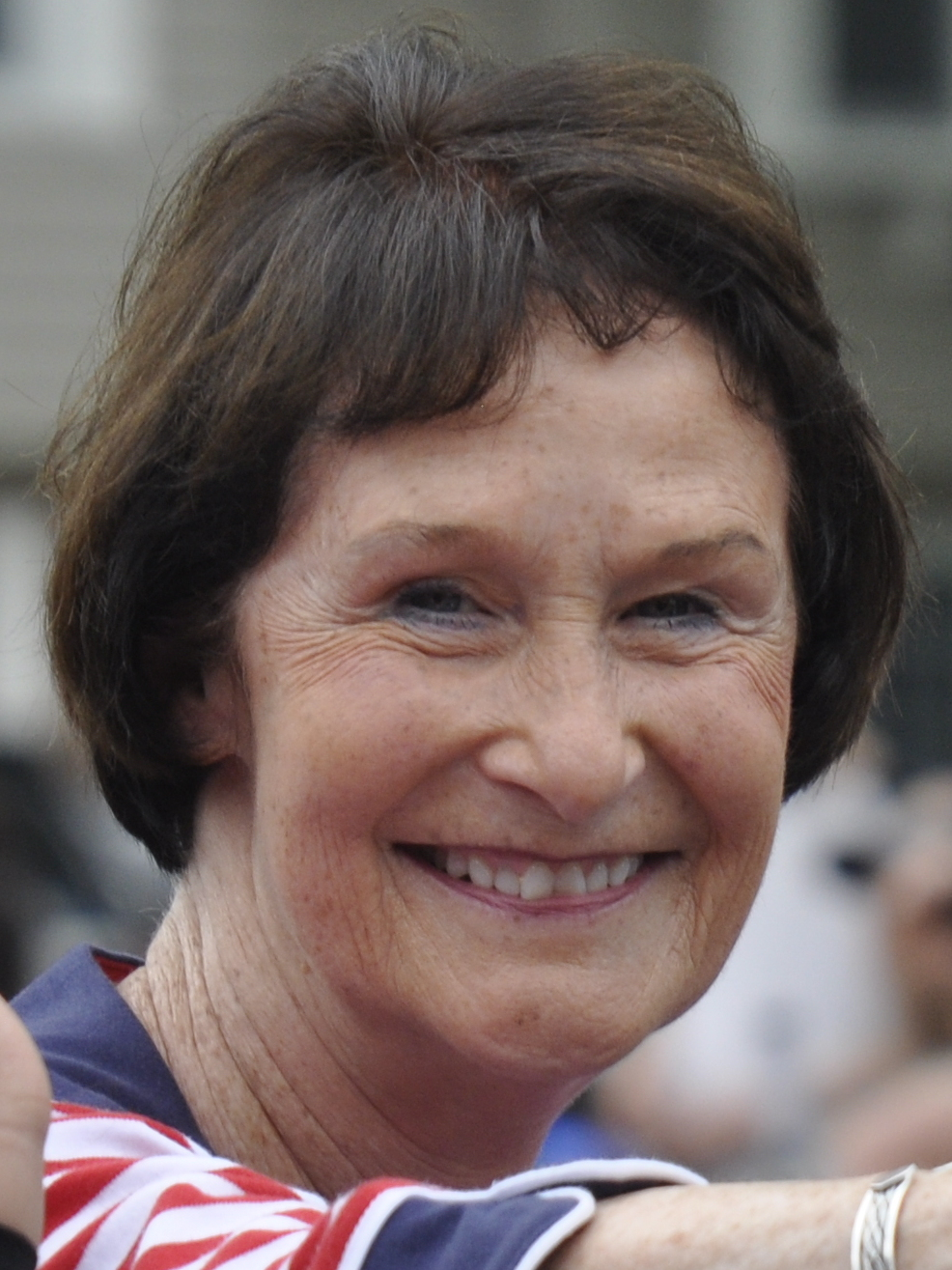

Chair of the Fairfax County Board of Supervisors
- In office February 3, 2009 – December 16, 2019
- Preceded by: Gerry Connolly
- Succeeded by: Jeff McKay

Member of the Fairfax County Board of Supervisors from the Braddock district
- In office 1988–2009
- Preceded by: Audrey Moore
- Succeeded by: John Cook

Personal details
- Born: Sharon Schuster; December 6, 1947 (age 78)
- Party: Democratic
- Spouses: Richard T. Bulova; Louis G. DeFalaise
- Children: David L. Bulova; Karin Johansson
- Education: Northern Virginia Community College
- Website: sharonbulova.com

Sharon Schuster Bulova (/bəˈloʊvə/; born December 6, 1947) is an American politician who served as chairwoman of the Fairfax County Board of Supervisors in Virginia. A Democrat, she was first elected chairwoman in a special election on February 3, 2009. Bulova was reelected in 2011 and again on November 3, 2015. She retired at the end of her last term in December 2019, and was replaced by fellow Democrat Jeff McKay.

== Early life and education ==
One of four children of Lawrence King Schuster, Sr. and the former Mary Suzanne Knox, Sharon Schuster grew up in Pikesville, Maryland, a suburb of Baltimore. In 1966, Schuster married scientist Richard T. Bulova and the couple moved to Fairfax County, where Richard worked at Fort Belvoir. After living in Woodbridge for a short time, in 1971, they moved back to Fairfax County, buying a house in the Kings Park West neighborhood of Fairfax.

Bulova was elected vice president of the Kings Park West Civic Association, then became president when the existing president moved to Korea. In 1984, Annandale District Supervisor Audrey Moore hired Bulova.

== Political career ==
In 1987, Bulova was working as a legislative aide to Annandale District Supervisor Audrey Moore when Moore decided to challenge Republican Jack Herrity for the Chair of the Fairfax County Board of Supervisors. Moore encouraged Bulova to replace her on the Board; Bulova declared her candidacy in April 1987.

Bulova, a Democrat, defeated Republican D. Patrick Mullins for the Annandale District seat in the November 1987 election, and was sworn in the following January.

In 1988, Bulova became a member of the Northern Virginia Transportation Commission.

In her first term as supervisor, Bulova focused on transportation, environmental and educational issues. One of her major projects, which she had begun working on while still on Audrey Moore's staff, was the Virginia Railway Express commuter rail service.

Bulova announced her run for a second term as supervisor in February 1991. Though Democratic chair Audrey Moore was deeply unpopular, and despite the Republican strategy of tying all the board's Democrats to deeply unpopular chair Audrey Moore, Bulova won reelection as supervisor from the renamed Braddock District in November 1991, defeating Paul E. Jenkins.

In her 1995 run, Bulova handily defeated the Republican candidate, restaurant owner Paul A. Romano, III.

Bulova was unopposed for her runs as Braddock District Supervisor in 1999 and 2003. She defeated Carey C. Campbell in the 2007 election for Braddock District supervisor with over 80% of the vote.

The election of Gerry Connolly as congressman from Virginia's 11th congressional district in November 2008 necessitated a special election to fill the chairman's seat on the Board of Supervisors. In the February 3, 2009, special election, Bulova defeated her challengers, Republican Springfield District Supervisor Pat S. Herrity, as well as Independent Green Carey C. Campbell and independent Christopher F. DeCarlo.

On November 3, 2015, Bulova was reelected as chairman of the Board of Supervisors, defeating Republican Arthur G. Purves and Independent Green Glenda Gail Parker.

In November 2011, Bulova received the Tower of Dulles award from the Committee for Dulles for her work to bring Metrorail to Dulles International Airport.

== Community efforts ==
In 2011, Bulova initiated a Private Sector Energy Task Force consisting of corporate, institutional, and community leaders. The task force was charged with defining a strategy to position Fairfax County as a leader in the areas of energy efficiency, sustainability, and green technology.

The Business Roundtable Discussion Group was put together by Bulova to identify strategies for accelerating economic recovery in Fairfax County. In addition, the group is tasked with finding new economic development opportunities that include energy efficiency, conservation, and affordable housing strategies.

Bulova put together a task force for the Fairfax County Asian American History Project. In May 2010, this task force produced a book and a website which captures the history of Asian-Americans in Fairfax County.

Bulova founded the Faith Communities in Action. This countywide network encourages faith communities and charitable non-profit organizations to work in partnership with local government to better respond to the needs of the community.
