= Dacus (disambiguation) =

Dacus is a genus of tephritid or fruit flies in the family Tephritidae.

Dacus may also refer to:

- Adjectival form of Latin Dacia, ancient kingdom in Central and South-Eastern Europe
- Adjectival form of Latin Dacia (Denmark), medieval Latin name for Denmark or the Nordic region in general
- Dacus, Latinised name of the mediaeval English Denys family, of Danish origin
- Dacus (surname)
