= Pat Herrity =

American politician (born 1960)

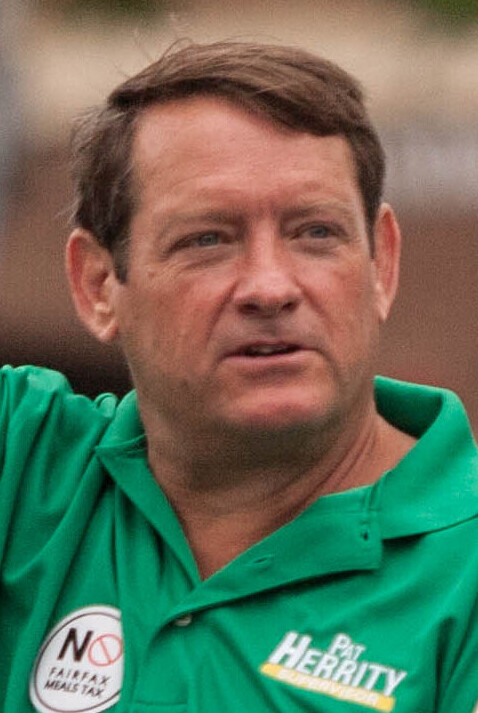
- Herrity in 2016

Member of the Fairfax County Board of Supervisors from the Springfield district
- Incumbent
- Assumed office 2008
- Preceded by: Elaine McConnell

Personal details
- Born: Patrick Shawn Herrity; January 26, 1960 (age 66) Washington, D.C.
- Party: Republican
- Spouse: Nancy Herrity
- Children: 2
- Relatives: John F. Herrity (father)
- Education: Virginia Tech (BS)

Patrick Shawn Herrity (born January 26, 1960) is an American politician and financial consultant serving as a member of the Fairfax County Board of Supervisors from the Springfield district since 2008. A member of the Republican Party, his district encompasses all of Clifton, Greenbriar, Fair Lakes, South Run, and Union Mill, along with parts of Braddock, Burke, Centreville, Crosspointe, Fair Oaks, Fairfax Station, Newington, Newington Forest, Oakton, and West Springfield. As of 2026, he is the only elected Republican official in Fairfax County.

== Early life and career ==
Herrity was born in Washington, D.C. and grew up in Springfield, Virginia, where he graduated from West Springfield High School. He is the son of former longtime Fairfax County Board of Supervisors chairman Jack Herrity. He obtained a bachelor's degree in accounting from Virginia Tech.

Herrity has held senior management positions in a number of Northern Virginia government contracting and technology companies. He and his wife Nancy have two children.

== Political career ==
A member of the Republican Party, Herrity was first elected to the Fairfax County Board of Supervisors in 2007. In 2009, Herrity ran in a special election for the position of chairperson vacated by newly elected congressman Gerry Connolly. He lost to Democrat Sharon Bulova by a close margin of 1,206 votes out of 103,972 cast. In 2010, Herrity ran in the Virginia's 11th congressional district election against Connolly, but lost the Republican primary to Keith Fimian, a more conservative candidate.

Herrity was reelected in 2011 and 2015 without major-party opposition. In 2019, he narrowly defeated Democrat Linda Sperling by around 600 votes out of more than 40,000 cast. Since 2020, Herrity has been the only Republican on the Board of Supervisors. In 2023, Herrity was endorsed by The Washington Post editorial board and Democratic state senator Chap Petersen. He defeated Democratic challenger Albert Vega by 14 percentage points.

In January 2025, Herrity declared his candidacy for the 2025 Virginia lieutenant gubernatorial election. He later withdrew from the race due to health issues.

== Political positions ==
Herrity was described by The Washington Post in 2019 as a "voice of fiscal restraint on the board". In office, Herrity advocated for reforming Fairfax County's employee compensation and pension programs, and for increased law enforcement funding. He vocally opposed a proposed four percent county tax on prepared food and beverages, which voters defeated in a 2016 referendum. In 2020 during the COVID-19 pandemic, Herrity supported allowing for optional in-person learning in schools and opposed Northern Virginia easing restrictions later than the rest of the state.

In 2022, Herrity was the only member of the Board to not vote for a climate resilience plan, abstaining due to concerns about its cost. He voted to put a list of reproductive health resources on the county's website in 2022, and called for the list to also include adoption resources and support for full-term pregnancies. Herrity was one of two board members to vote against a 30% member pay raise in 2023, from $95,000 to $123,000 annually, following eight years of flat pay for the Board. In 2024, Herrity called on Fairfax County to end sanctuary county policies for undocumented immigrants and honor detainment requests from Immigration and Customs Enforcement. In 2025, Herrity opposed the adaptation of a four percent countywide meals tax, and he argued for a more judicious approach towards fiscal restraint.
