= Kathy Smith (American politician) =

American politician (born 1954)

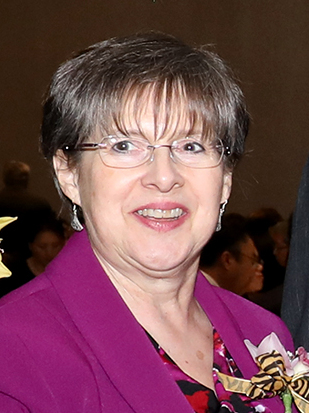
- Smith in 2019

Member of the Fairfax County Board of Supervisors from the Sully district
- Incumbent
- Assumed office 2016
- Preceded by: Michael Frey

Member of the Fairfax County School Board
- In office 2002–2016

Personal details
- Born: November 10, 1954 (age 71) New Jersey, U.S.
- Party: Democratic Party
- Spouse: Steve
- Children: 4
- Education: Muhlenberg College

Kathy Lynn Smith is an American politician and former educator serving as a member of the Fairfax County Board of Supervisors from the Sully district since 2016. A member of the Democratic Party, she previously served as the Sully District Representative to the Fairfax County School Board from 2002 to 2016. Her district encompasses western Fairfax County, including parts of Chantilly, Centreville, Franklin Farm, and Oak Hill.

Smith has served as chairwoman of the Board's Development Process Committee and as a member of several more committees. From the beginning of her time in office, Smith has represented 100,000 residents.

== Early life and career ==
Smith is originally from New Jersey. After graduating from Muhlenberg College in Allentown, Pennsylvania, with a dual Bachelor of Arts in sociology and elementary education, Smith taught first grade in New Jersey and then second grade at an international school in Saudi Arabia, for a total of seven years. She stopped working to raise her children full time until she began running for office.

Smith moved to the Sully district of Fairfax, Virginia in 1984 with her husband, Steve. The couple have four grown children, who all attended Fairfax County Public Schools while growing up. Smith's public career began when she served as PTA president at the three schools her children attended, Poplar Tree Elementary School, Rocky Run Middle School, and Chantilly High School.

== Political views ==
Smith is a member of the Democratic Party. Throughout her political career, she has advocated for improved education, transportation, and environmental protections.

== 2015-2016 election ==
Smith first ran for office in 2015–16 as a candidate to replace retiring Supervisor Michael R. Frey, who had held the position for 24 years.

In a 2015 interview, Smith distinguished herself from her opponent, Republican John Guevara, by noting "We see the job of supervisor and the role of local government very differently." She went on to say that she would work full-time in the position, prioritize education, and approach issues "in a non-partisan manner to find common sense solutions to the challenges we face as our population ages and changes." Guevara later tried, unsuccessfully, to attack Smith on the basis of her husband's salary, saying that she could afford to be supervisor full-time because he still needed to work another job to support his family.

Smith was elected by a 52% to 48% margin over Guevara. Her commitment to community well-being and meeting residents' needs during her term included increasing public works budgets and appearing at casual events, such as a Pokémon Go event sponsored at a local park.

== 2019–2020 election ==
Smith ran for re-election and a second term in 2019. Her platform emphasized funding education, protecting the local environment, improving transportation and reducing commute times, and meeting the needs of a diverse Fairfax population.

In a 2019 interview, Smith pointed out that "Our county government employees, county first responders, caregivers in the healthcare and education industries cannot live in the communities that they serve, protect, help, and educate. Our workers should have the opportunity to live in the area that they spend the most time in."

Her run for re-election was endorsed by several local organizations and unions.

Ultimately, Smith won 62.85% of the vote, while her opponent, Republican Srilekha Palle, gained 36.88%. This victory was part of a larger Democratic win that secured several legislative majorities across Virginia.
