= Mitchell-Weeks House =

Building in Virginia, United States

Coordinates: 38.8896°N 77.4208°W

- Interactive map of the Mitchell-Weeks House area

General information
- Architectural style: Rustic architecture
- Location: Virginia, U.S.
- Opened: 1789

Technical details
- Material: Log

The Mitchell-Weeks House is a "Potomac Valley style" log farmhouse first built in 1789. Descendants of builder Benjamin Mitchell lived in the house, located in Chantilly, Virginia just west of the intersection of Lee-Jackson Highway and Lee's Corner Road, until approximately 1940.

Subsequent owners renovated and remodeled the house, but it currently preserves the Early American-era log front wall and stone chimneys. The Fairfax County Park Authority erected a historical marker for the house in 2003.
