= Audrey Moore (politician) =

American politician (1928–2018)

Chair of the Fairfax County Board of Supervisors
- In office 1988–1991
- Preceded by: John F. Herrity
- Succeeded by: Tom Davis

Member of the Fairfax County Board of Supervisors from the Annandale District
- In office 1972–1987
- Preceded by: Charles Majer
- Succeeded by: Sharon Bulova

Personal details
- Born: Audrey Campbell Moore; December 28, 1928 Maracaibo, Venezuela
- Died: December 12, 2018 (aged 89)
- Party: Democratic
- Spouse: Samuel V. Moore
- Children: Robert; Andrew; Douglas
- Education: University of New Hampshire

Audrey Campbell Moore (December 28, 1928 – December 12, 2018) was an American politician from Fairfax County, Virginia. She served for twenty years on the Fairfax County Board of Supervisors, including one term as chairwoman.

Moore won the position of chair after defeating Republican Jack Herrity in his bid for reelection in 1987. She had previously represented the Annandale district on the board.

The Wakefield Park Recreation Center, built in 1977, was renamed for her.
