= Americans At War =

Documentary series by the U.S. Naval institute featuring veterans

Americans at War is a documentary series created by the U.S. Naval Institute. Each 90-second episode features a U.S. veteran recounting a defining moment from his or her time in the armed services. As of December 2007, the Institute has produced 40 episodes.

The vignettes have aired on PBS as individual segments and, on November 11, 2007, in a half-hour program containing 21 vignettes. In 2008, PBS will air three one-hour specials under the Americans at War banner. These will be Americans at War: Vietnam hosted by Joe Galloway, Americans at War: The Doolittle Raid hosted by David Hartman, and Americans at War: Pearl Harbor.

== Interviewees ==
- Edwin C. Bearss
- George H. W. Bush
- Dan Buzzo
- Joe Galloway
- Thomas Griffin
- Fred Haynes
- James L. Holloway III
- Lew Hopkins
- Leo P. Jarboe
- George Juskalian
- Dusty Kleiss
- James Leavelle
- Charles McGee
- Jerry Miller
- John Ripley (USMC)
- Don Stratton
- Kermit Tyler
- Wilbur Wright
- Paul A. Yost, Jr.
- Richard Zimmerman
