= Chantilly, Virginia =

CDP in Virginia, United States

Chantilly
- Census-designated place
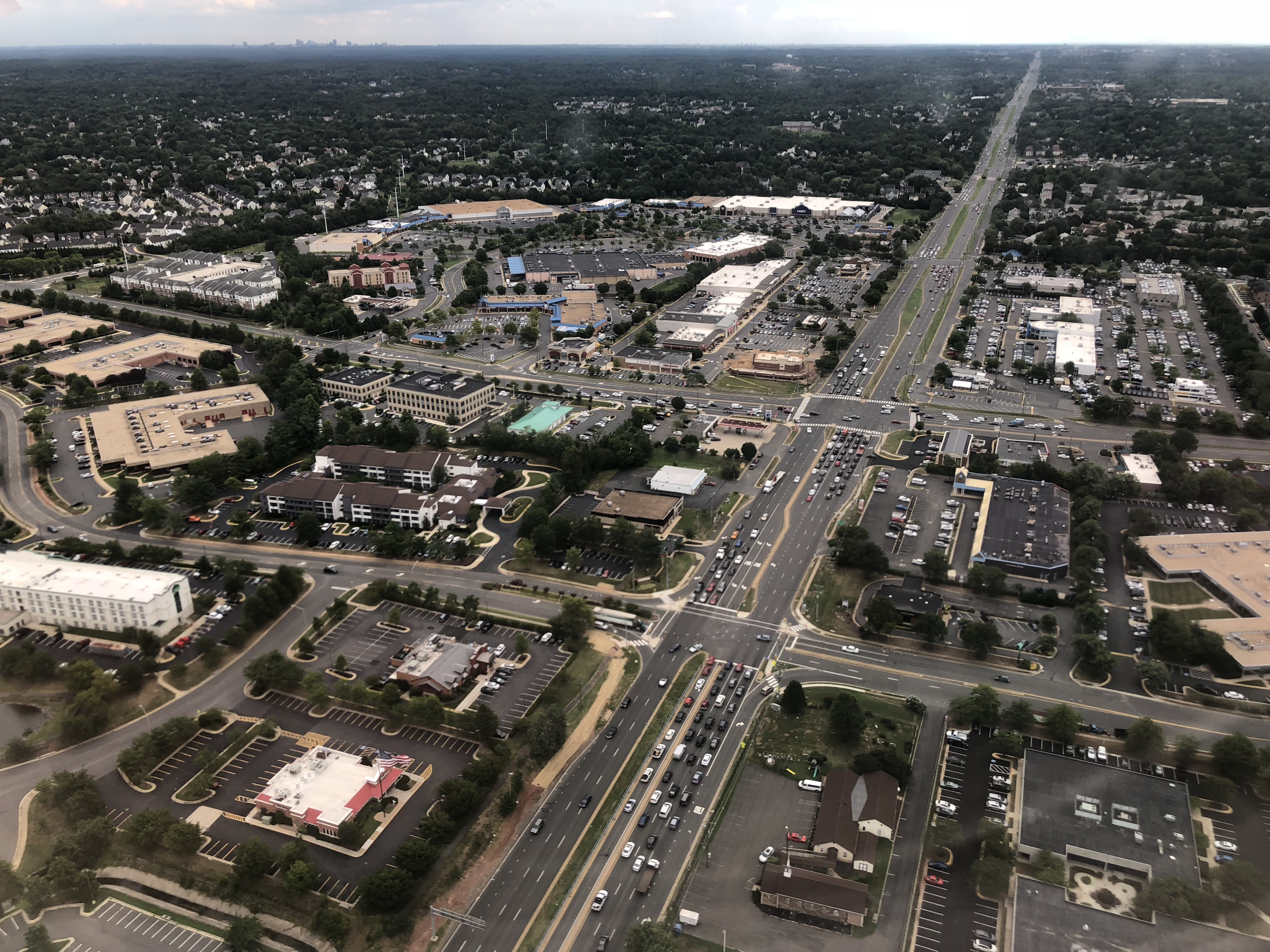
- Central Chantilly

- Location of Chantilly in Fairfax County, Virginia

- Location within Northern Virginia Location within Virginia Location within the United States
- Coordinates: 38°52′39″N 77°25′52″W
- Country: United States
- State: Virginia
- County: Fairfax

Area
  - Total: 12.12 sq mi (31.40 km^{2})
  - Land: 12.00 sq mi (31.09 km^{2})
  - Water: 0.12 sq mi (0.32 km^{2})
- Elevation: 322 ft (98 m)

Population (2020)
  - Total: 24,301
  - Density: 2,024/sq mi (781.6/km^{2})
- Time zone: UTC−5 (Eastern)
  - Summer (DST): UTC−4 (Eastern)
- ZIP Codes: 20151–20153
- Area codes: 703, 571
- FIPS code: 51-14744

Chantilly is a census-designated place (CDP) in western Fairfax County, Virginia, United States. The population was 24,301 as of the 2020 census. Located in the Northern Virginia portion of the Washington metropolitan area, Chantilly is about 25 miles (40 km) west of Washington, D.C., via Interstate 66 and U.S. Route 50. It is located between Centreville to the south, Herndon and Reston to the north and northeast, respectively, and Fairfax 7 miles (11 km) to the southeast. U.S. Route 50 and Virginia State Route 28 intersect in Chantilly, and these highways provide access to the Dulles/Reston/Tysons Corner technology corridor and other major employment centers in Northern Virginia and Washington, D.C.

== Etymology ==
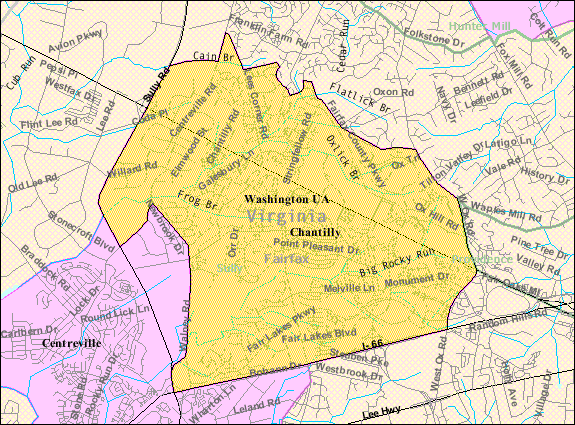
Map of Chantilly, VA according to the US Census Bureau

The name Chantilly originates from the Chantilly Plantation, established in the early 19th century by Charles Calvert Stuart and his wife, Cornelia Lee Turberville Stuart. Cornelia had inherited part of the Leeton estate from her father, George Richard Lee Turberville, and the couple built their mansion around 1817, naming it after the Westmoreland County estate previously owned by her grandfather, Richard Henry Lee, a signer of the Declaration of Independence.

The name "Chantilly" itself came from Château de Chantilly in France. Richard Henry Lee had named his estate "Chantilly" in 1763, which is believed to be the origin of the name later used by the Stuarts. The mansion was constructed using local red sandstone quarried from the property. Over time, the name "Chantilly" came to refer not only to the plantation but also to the surrounding area as the region developed.

The broader Chantilly area often includes neighboring South Riding. The official Chantilly CDP is within Fairfax County, while the South Riding CDP is in neighboring Loudoun County, both sharing the "Chantilly" mail address and ZIP Codes 20151/20152. Residents of both areas are situated along U.S. Route 50 and Virginia State Route 28.

== History ==
Chantilly was home to a number of colonial plantations in the 1700s, including the Sully Plantation (now the Sully Historic Site) built by Richard Bland Lee I. Other plantations included George Richard Lee Turberville's "Leeton Grove" (originally a 5,000+ acre plantation, the main house of which still stands at 4619 Walney Rd.), the John Hutchison Farm, and the Chantilly Plantation. During the Civil War, federal troops destroyed by fire the Chantilly Plantation manor house. One building remains, a stone house across Route 50 from the Greenbriar Shopping Center. While it is not clear what this stone house was used for, most historical evidence suggests it was probably a plantation overseer's quarters during the antebellum period, and a tavern or boarding house following the war. After the war, Cornelia Stuart, who had become deeply in debt, sold her 1,064-acre (431 ha) Chantilly estate. The advertisement for the sale referenced several "tenements", one of which was the Stone House.

The village grew during the 19th century, particularly following the construction of the Little River Turnpike to Winchester.

The evolution of the Chantilly area into an outer suburb of Washington, D.C., gained momentum after 1980, as developers built residential subdivisions and commercial areas, filling in the farmland south of Dulles Airport.

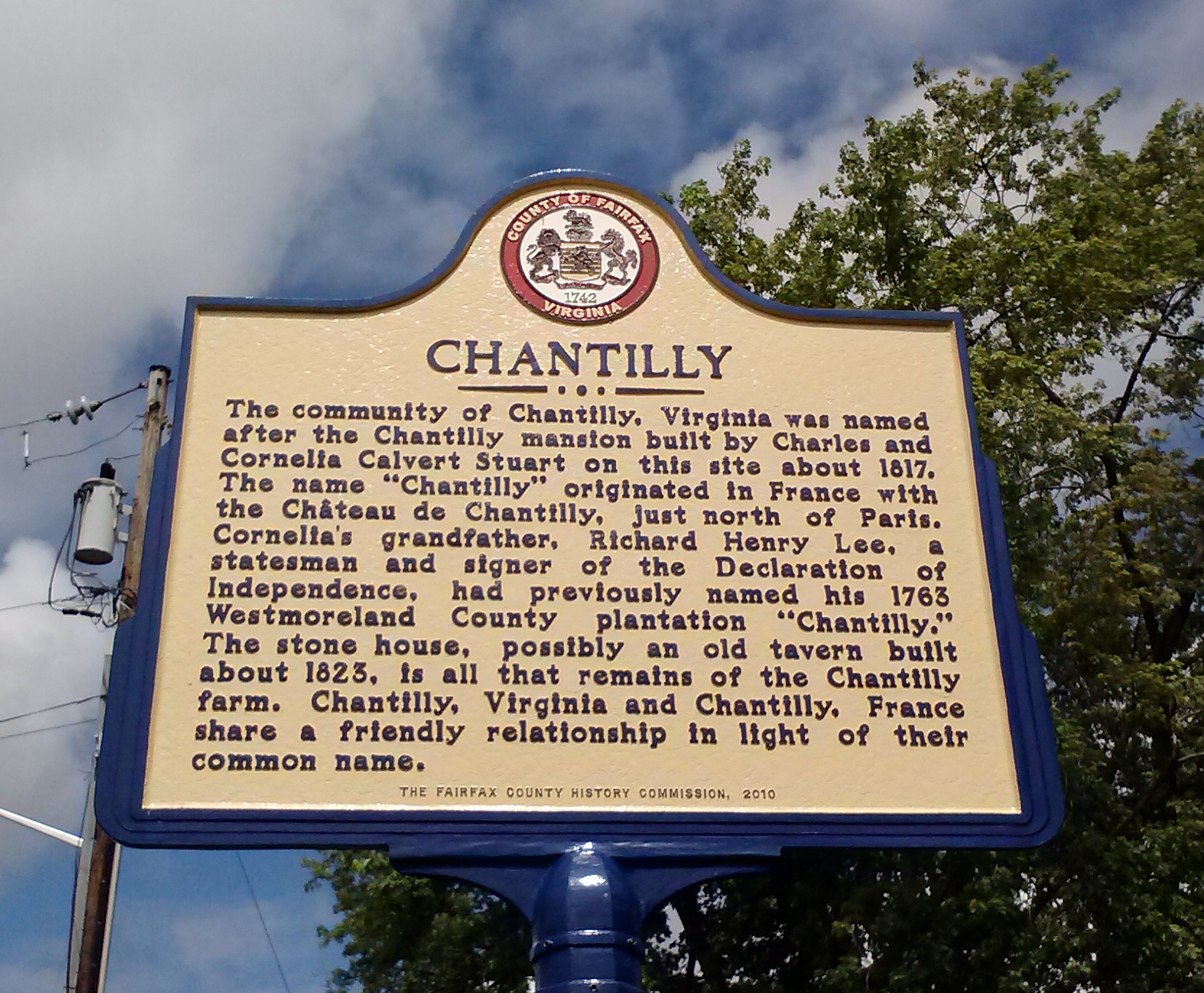
Historic marker commemorating Old Chantilly Farm House

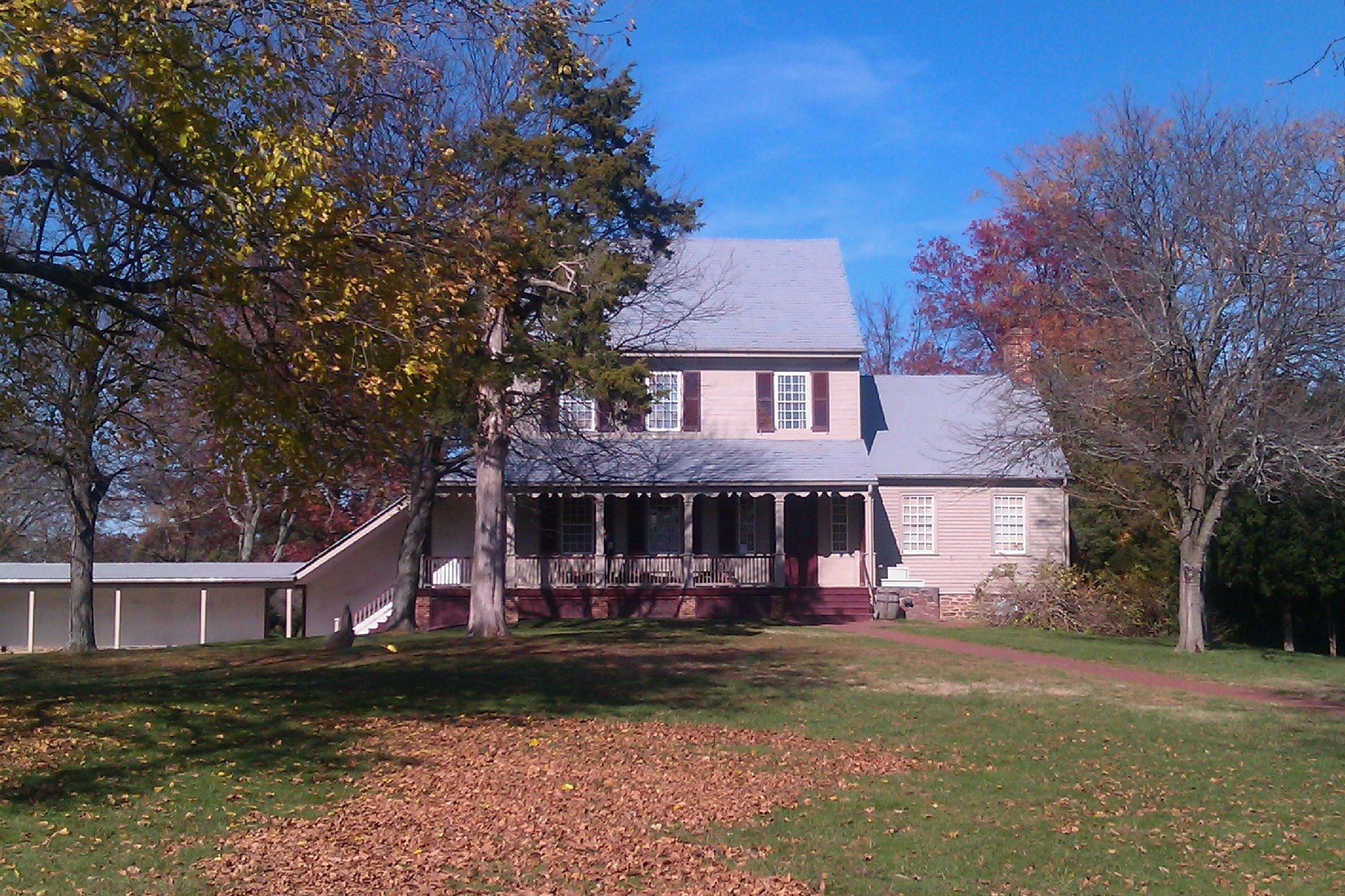
Sully Plantation (Sully Historic Site) Main House

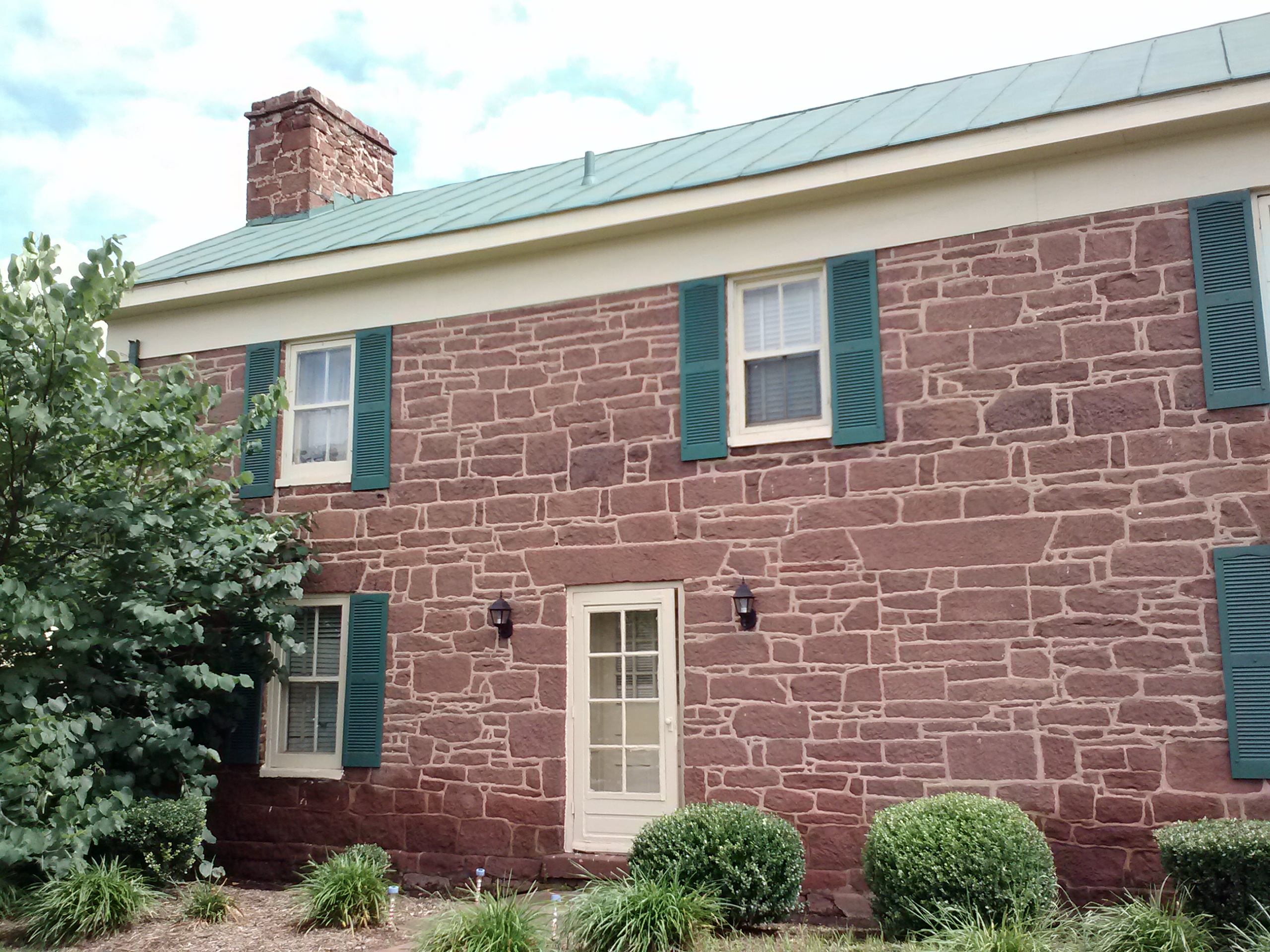
The Stone House. The only building of the former Chantilly Plantation (not to be confused with the Sully Plantation) that still exists today. It is located on the north side of Route 50, across from the Greenbriar Shopping Center. Historical evidence strongly suggests the Stone House was an overseer's quarters before the Civil War, and became a tavern later.

=== Civil War ===
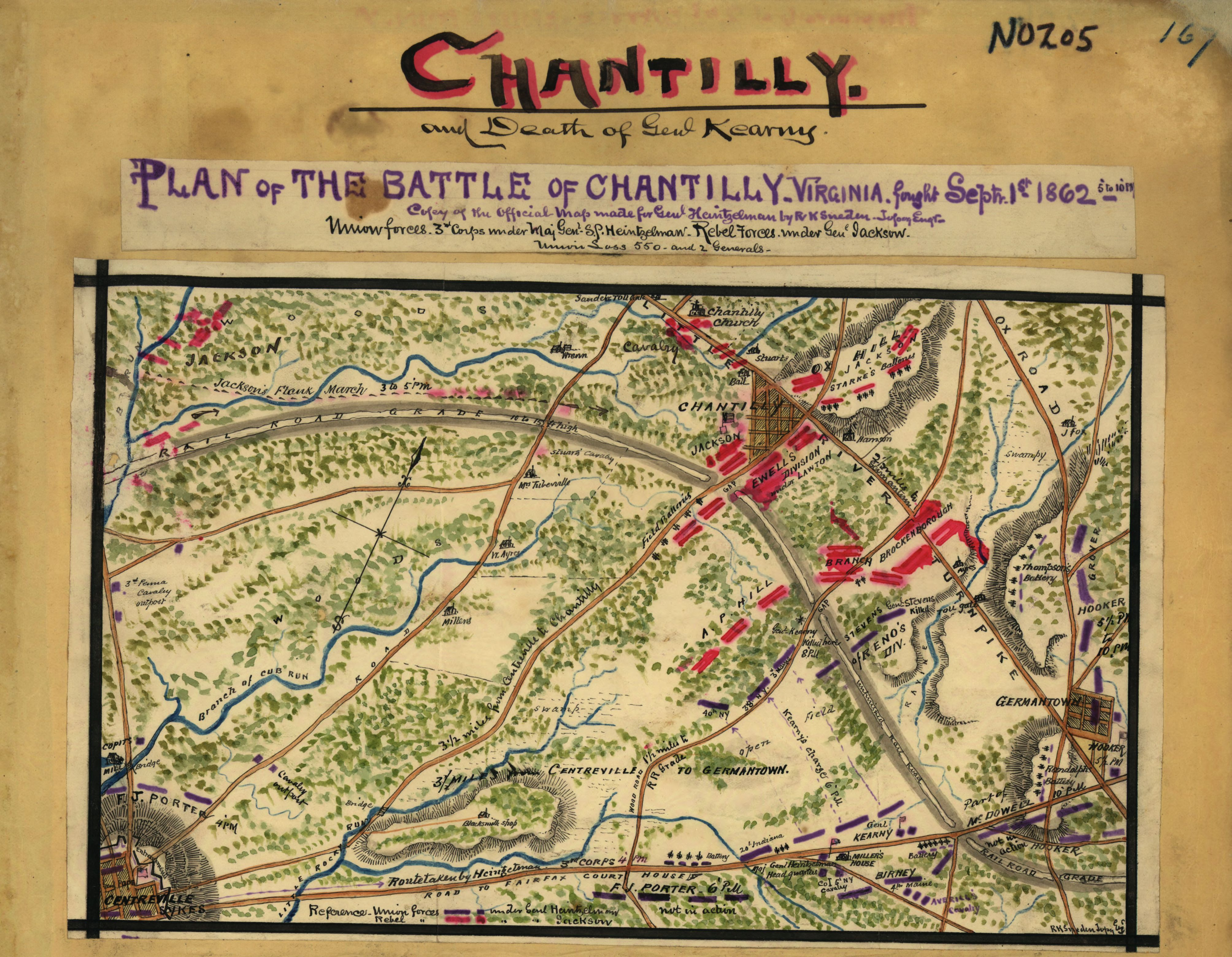
During the Civil War, Chantilly stretched to the intersection of West Ox Road and Monument Drive, shown in this original map of the Battle of Chantilly at the "GAP" between the two railroad grades to the immediate southeast of "A.P. Hill".

During the American Civil War on September 1, 1862, the Battle of Chantilly (or Ox Hill) was fought nearby. Following his victory at the Second Battle of Bull Run (or Second Manassas), Confederate General Robert E. Lee directed Major General Thomas J. "Stonewall" Jackson to cross Bull Run on August 31 and sweep around the position of Major General John Pope's Union Army of Virginia at Centreville. Reaching the Little River Turnpike (now U.S. Route 50) northwest of Centreville, Jackson turned southeastward toward Fairfax Court House (now the city of Fairfax) to strike in rear of Pope's army.

During September 1, Pope, apprised of Jackson's movement, began to withdraw toward Fairfax Court House. Late in the day, Jackson clashed with Union forces under Brigadier General Isaac Stevens and Major General Philip Kearny near Ox Hill, west of Fairfax. During the ensuing battle, which was fought amid a raging storm, both Union generals Stevens and Kearny were killed. The fighting ended at dusk, and Pope's army continued its withdrawal to Fairfax and subsequently to the Washington defenses.

Although commercial and residential development now covers most of the Chantilly (Ox Hill) battlefield, the small Ox Hill Battlefield Park preserves a 5-acre (2.0 ha) portion of the battle site.

== Geography ==
Chantilly is located in western Fairfax County at 38°53′39″N 77°25′52″W (38.894146, −77.431407). It is bordered to the west by the South Riding in Loudoun County, to the north by Washington Dulles International Airport, to the northeast by the Franklin Farm (CDP), to the east by the Greenbriar, and to the south by Centreville. To the southwest is Schneider Crossroads, not part of any census-designated area.

The present center of Chantilly is located around the intersection of U.S. Route 50 (Lee Jackson Memorial Highway) and Virginia Route 28 (Sully Road).

According to the United States Census Bureau, the CDP has a total area of 12.2 square miles (31.5 km^{2}), of which 12.0 square miles (31.1 km^{2}) is land and 0.1 square miles (0.3 km^{2}), or 1.07%, is water.

== Government ==
Chantilly is entirely incorporated in Virginia's 11th congressional district, currently represented by Democrat James Walkinshaw.

Located within the Sully District, the Fairfax County Supervisor for Chantilly is Democrat Kathy Smith.

Chantilly lies within the 8th and 9th state house districts, represented by Democrats Irene Shin and Karrie Delaney, respectively.

Democrat Stella Pekarsky represents Chantilly in the Virginia State Senate from the 36th district.

== Demographics ==
Historical population
Census	Pop.	Note	%±
1980	12,259		—
1990	29,337		139.3%
2000	41,041		39.9%
2010	23,039		−43.9%
2020	24,301		5.5%

=== Racial and ethnic composition ===
Chantilly CDP, Virginia – Racial and ethnic composition Note: the US Census treats Hispanic/Latino as an ethnic category. This table excludes Latinos from the racial categories and assigns them to a separate category. Hispanics/Latinos may be of any race.
Race / Ethnicity (NH = Non-Hispanic)	Pop 2000	Pop 2010	Pop 2020	% 2000	% 2010	% 2020	% 2025
White alone (NH)	28,372	11,283	8,748	69.13%	48.97%	36.00%	35.7%
Black or African American alone (NH)	2,008	1,432	1,423	4.89%	6.22%	5.86%	3.4%
Native American or Alaska Native alone (NH)	102	31	43	0.25%	0.13%	0.18%	0.0%
Asian alone (NH)	6,697	5,787	8,125	16.32%	25.12%	33.43%	37.9%
Native Hawaiian or Pacific Islander alone (NH)	22	12	7	0.05%	0.05%	0.03%	0.0%
Other race alone (NH)	52	74	147	0.13%	0.32%	0.60%	0.43%
Mixed race or Multiracial (NH)	970	759	915	2.36%	3.29%	3.77%	12.0%
Hispanic or Latino (any race)	2,818	3,661	4,893	6.87%	15.89%	20.13%	19.1%
Total	41,041	23,039	24,301	100.00%	100.00%	100.00%	100.00%

=== 2020 census ===
As of the 2020 census, Chantilly had a population of 24,301 and a population density of 2,025.1 inhabitants per square mile (781.6/km^{2}). The median age was 38.7 years; 25.0% of residents were under the age of 18 and 11.4% were 65 years of age or older. For every 100 females there were 100.7 males, and for every 100 females age 18 and over there were 98.9 males age 18 and over.

99.7% of residents lived in urban areas, while 0.3% lived in rural areas.

There were 7,606 households in Chantilly, of which 42.5% had children under the age of 18 living in them. Of all households, 65.3% were married-couple households, 12.7% were households with a male householder and no spouse or partner present, and 18.1% were households with a female householder and no spouse or partner present. About 13.4% of all households were made up of individuals and 4.6% had someone living alone who was 65 years of age or older.

There were 7,716 housing units, of which 1.4% were vacant. The homeowner vacancy rate was 0.6% and the rental vacancy rate was 1.5%.

Racial composition as of the 2020 census
Race	Number	Percent
White	9,416	38.7%
Black or African American	1,475	6.1%
American Indian and Alaska Native	151	0.6%
Asian	8,159	33.6%
Native Hawaiian and Other Pacific Islander	7	0.0%
Some other race	2,387	9.8%
Two or more races	2,706	11.1%
Hispanic or Latino (of any race)	4,893	20.1%

=== 2022 American Community Survey ===
The largest ancestry group was the 7.3% who had English ancestry, 54.6% spoke a language other than English at home, and 45.1% were born outside the United States, 60.1% of whom were naturalized citizens. The average family household had 3.56 people.

The median income for a household in the CDP was $137,722, and the median income for a family was $155,000. 4.8% of the population were military veterans, and 59.2% had a bachelor's degree or higher. In the CDP, 3.8% of the population was below the poverty line, including 6.5% of those under age 18 and 2.2% of those age 65 or over, with 9.8% of the population without health insurance.

=== 2010 census ===
As of the census of 2010, there were 23,039 people, 7,218 households, and 5,939 families residing in the CDP. The population density was 1,916.7 people per square mile (740.1/km^{2}). There were 7,403 housing units at an average density of 615.9/sq mi (237.8/km^{2}). The racial makeup of the CDP was 57.6% White, 6.5% African American, 0.3% Native American, 25.2% Asian, 0.1% Pacific Islander, 6.1% some other race, and 4.3% from two or more races. Hispanic or Latino people of any race were 15.9% of the population.

There were 7,218 households, out of which 47.8% had children under the age of 18 living with them, 67.0% were headed by married couples living together, 10.6% had a female householder with no husband present, and 17.7% were non-families. Of all households 13.0% were made up of individuals, and 2.4% were someone living alone who was 65 years of age or older. The average household size was 3.19, and the average family size was 3.46.

In the CDP the population was spread out, with 27.8% under the age of 18, 7.8% from 18 to 24, 28.6% from 25 to 44, 29.3% from 45 to 64, and 6.5% who were 65 years of age or older. The median age was 36.1 years. For every 100 females there were 100.2 males. For every 100 females age 18 and over, there were 98.7 males.

For the period 2010 through 2014, the estimated median annual income for a household in the CDP was $118,991, and the median income for a family was $130,280. Male full-time workers had a median income of $81,596 versus $62,228 for females. The per capita income for the CDP was $46,341. About 7.5% of families and 8.9% of the population were below the poverty line, including 14.3% of those under age 18 and 6.2% of those age 65 or over.

== Economy ==
The American Registry for Internet Numbers is headquartered adjacent to Washington Dulles International Airport, near Chantilly.

At one time, Compass Airlines was headquartered near Chantilly. The headquarters was relocated to Minnesota in late 2009.

== Notable local organizations ==
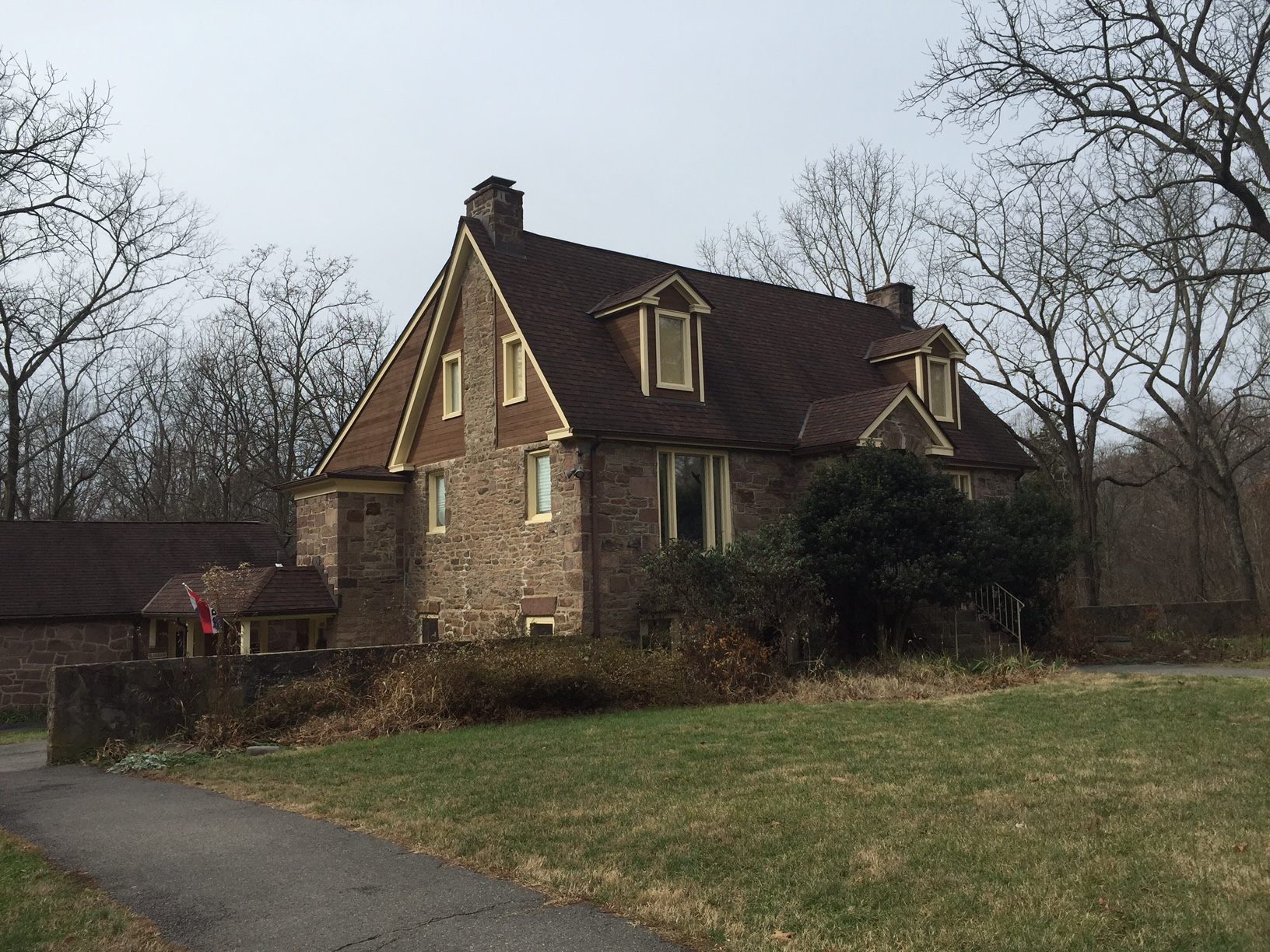
The Walney Visitor Center at Ellanor C. Lawrence Park

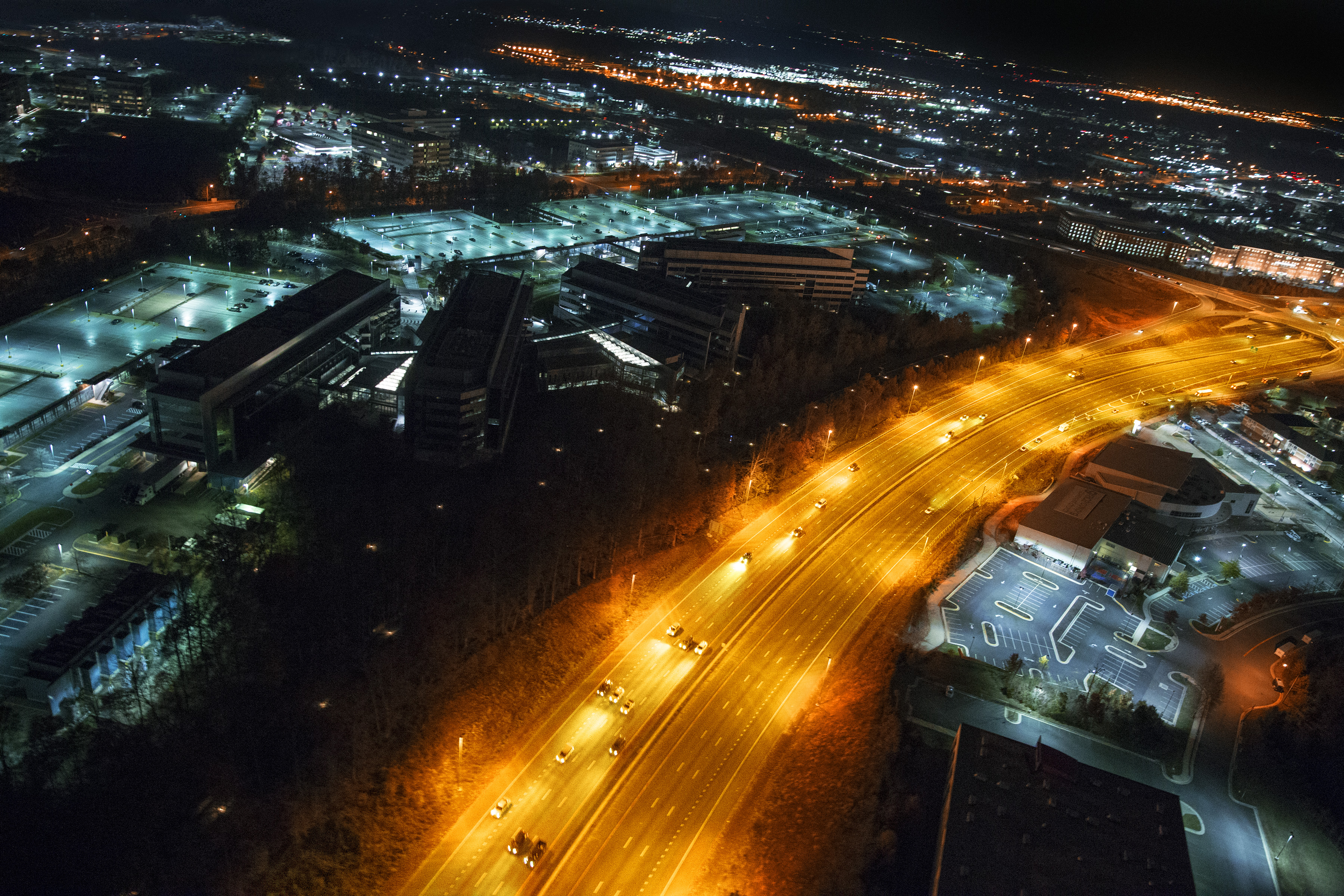
National Reconnaissance Office at night

- Ellanor C. Lawrence Park – Along Route 28 between Chantilly and Centreville, the park grounds include the historic farmhouse and mill, trails, fitness stations, and athletic fields. Coyote sightings have been reported within the park.
- Flat Lick Stream Valley Park
- The Steven F. Udvar-Hazy Center annex of the National Air and Space Museum
- The headquarters of the National Reconnaissance Office (NRO), which is one of the 17 U.S. intelligence agencies and considered, along with the Central Intelligence Agency (CIA), National Security Agency (NSA), Defense Intelligence Agency (DIA), and National Geospatial-Intelligence Agency (NGA), to be one of the "big five" U.S. Intelligence agencies. It designs, builds, and operates the spy satellites of the United States government, and provides satellite intelligence to several government agencies, particularly signals intelligence (SIGINT) to the NSA, imagery intelligence (IMINT) to the NGA, and measurement and signature intelligence (MASINT) to the DIA.
- The Westfields Marriott in Chantilly hosted the annual Bilderberg summit in 2002, 2008, 2012, and 2017, which inspired protests.

== Education ==
=== Primary and secondary schools ===
Residents of the CDP go to Fairfax County Public Schools.

Elementary schools serving the CDP include Brookfield Elementary School, Bull Run Elementary School, Greenbriar East Elementary School, Greenbriar West Elementary School, Lees Corner Elementary School, Navy Elementary School, and Poplar Tree Elementary School.

Rocky Run Middle School, Franklin Middle School, and Chantilly High School are located within the CDP. Westfield High School is a large high school located outside of the CDP.

St. Timothy School and St. Veronica School, private Catholic schools, are located in the CDP.

=== Public libraries ===
Fairfax County Public Library operates the Chantilly Regional Library in the CDP.

== Media ==
Chantilly is served by The CentreView newspaper.

== Notable people ==
- Chris Beatty, American football coach
- Chuck Caputo, Virginia House of Delegates
- Kaye Dacus, author
- Phil Hubbard, former professional basketball player
- Bhawoh Jue, former professional American football player
- Joe Koshansky, professional baseball player
- Alessandra Marc, dramatic soprano
- Jimmy Martin, former professional American football player
- Cameron Nizialek, professional American football player
- Eddie Royal, former professional American football player
- Evan Royster, former professional American football player

== See also ==
- Mitchell-Weeks House, log cabin with historic marker
- Willard, Virginia, adjacent town displaced for construction of Dulles Airport
