= Frederick Babson =

American politician

Chair of the Fairfax County, Virginia Board of Supervisors
- In office 1968–1970
- Preceded by: Position created
- Succeeded by: William Hoofnagle

Member of the Fairfax County Board of Supervisors from the Falls Church District
- In office 1964–1967
- Preceded by: Robert C. Cotten
- Succeeded by: District abolished

Personal details
- Born: July 9, 1930 Savannah, Georgia, U.S.
- Died: September 17, 1999 (aged 69) Arlington County, Virginia, U.S.
- Party: Democratic
- Education: University of North Carolina at Chapel Hill
- Occupation: Attorney

Frederick Augustus Babson, Jr. (July 9, 1930 – September 17, 1999) was an attorney and politician from Fairfax County, Virginia who was the inaugural holder of the position of chairman of the Fairfax County Board of Supervisors, a job he held from 1968 to 1970.

Babson came to the area in 1958 to work for Turney & Turney, a law firm in Washington, D.C.

In June 1960, Babson was appointed by the Fairfax County board of supervisors to coordinate the county's defense against the City of Falls Church, which sought to annex roughly 4.5 square miles of the county. After several months gathering evidence to fight the suit, Babson resigned in February 1961 to return to private practice with what was now the law firm of Turney, Major, Markham and Sherfy.

In 1963, Babson was elected to the Falls Church District seat on the Fairfax County board of supervisors, defeating incumbent Republican Robert C. Cotten. In January 1966, he was elected chairman of the board by his fellow supervisors.

Fairfax County voters approved a referendum in November 1966 that changed the county's plan of government from the county executive form, under which the county had operated since 1952, to the new urban county executive form.

A significant change to the board of supervisors was the change of the chairmanship from a single-year term selected by the supervisors from among their membership to an at-large office directly elected by the voters of the county. Babson declared his candidacy for this newly created chairmanship in January 1967.

Babson won the chairmanship the November 1967 election, defeating former Mason District Supervisor Stanford E. Parris and Vienna Mayor James C. Martinelli.

In November 1969, Babson resigned as chairman of the Fairfax County board of supervisors, citing the low pay of $10,000 per year for the part-time office as motive. Fairfax County Circuit Court Judge Arthur W. Sinclair appointed Fairfax County School Board member William S. Hoofnagle to serve out the rest of Babson's term on December 10, 1969, and Hoofnagle took office in January 1970.

Babson's resignation from the chair effectively put an end to his political career. In 1974, he attempted to mount a campaign as an independent for Virginia's Eighth Congressional District. He also unsuccessfully sought the seat of retiring Senator William L. Scott in 1978, but did not receive his party's nomination.

== Death ==
On September 17, 1999, Babson died after brain surgery.
