= Dacus (surname) =

Dacus is a surname. Notable people with the surname include:

- Donnie Dacus (born 1951), American musician
- Joseph A. Dacus (1838–1885), American author
- Kaye Dacus (born 1971), American fiction author
- Lucy Dacus (born 1995), American indie rock singer and guitarist
- Pence Dacus (1931–2019), American football player and coach
- Weston Dacus (born 1985), American footballer
