= John F. Herrity =

American politician, lawyer, and businessman (1932–2006)

Chairman of Fairfax County Board of Supervisors
- In office January 5, 1976 – December 31, 1988
- Preceded by: Jean Packard
- Succeeded by: Audrey Moore

Personal details
- Born: 1932; Arlington County, Virginia, U.S.
- Died: February 1, 2006 (aged 74); Woodburn, Virginia, U.S.
- Political party: Republican
- Children: Pat Herrity (son)
- Education: Georgetown University (undergrad; law)
- Occupation: Politician, businessman, lawyer
- Nickname: "Mr. Fairfax"

John F. "Jack" Herrity (1932 – February 1, 2006) was an American businessman, lawyer and politician, who served as a member of the Fairfax County Board of Supervisors for 16 years from 1976 to 1988, including 12 years as chairman.

== Biography ==
Herrity was born in Arlington County, Virginia in 1932, and was raised in Prince George's County. He attended Georgetown University, receiving an undergraduate in law. He later started Jack Herrity and Associates, an insurance business.

In 1974, he ran against Robert E. Harris for Virginia House of Delegates, but lost the Republican nomination.

Herrity was elected chairman of the Fairfax County Board of Supervisors on January 5, 1976, and serving until December 31, 1988. While serving, he helped fund construction for the Fairfax County Parkway, which was named after him in 1995. He brought many fortune 500 companies to Fairfax County. In 1980, Washingtonian named him the "Washingtonian of the year".

In 1986, Herrity was charged with violating public disclosure laws.

In 1987, he raised over $70,000 to fund his reelection campaign, with funding received from Bob Dole and Paul Trible.

Herrity died of an aortic aneurysm in the Inova Fairfax Hospital on February 1, 2006. After his death, Frank Wolf made a statement, saying: "I to remember the Honorable John F. 'Jack' Herrity, former chairman of the Fairfax County, Virginia, Board of Supervisors, who passed away on February 1. If anyone is worthy of the title 'Mr. Fairfax,' Jack Herrity is that person". His son Pat is also a politician.
