= William Hoofnagle =

American politician (1921–2012)

Chair of the Fairfax County Board of Supervisors
- In office January 1970 – September 1972
- Preceded by: Frederick Babson
- Succeeded by: Jean Packard

Personal details
- Born: March 27, 1921 Atkins, Virginia, U.S.
- Died: August 15, 2012 (aged 91) Hayesville, North Carolina, U.S.
- Party: Democratic
- Education: University of Virginia
- Occupation: Economist

William Sherrill Hoofnagle (March 27, 1921 – August 15, 2012) was an economist and politician from Fairfax County, Virginia, who served as the second chairman of the Fairfax County Board of Supervisors after it became an at-large office. He served from January 1970 to September 1972.

== Career ==
Hoofnagle was appointed to the Fairfax County School Board in 1962 to represent the Centreville District by Supervisor Stuart T. DeBell. In 1964, Hoofnagle became chairman of the school board, a position he held until 1969.

In November 1969, Chairman of the Fairfax County Board of Supervisors Frederick A. Babson resigned, citing his frustration with the low pay of $10,000 per year for the part-time office. Fairfax County Circuit Court Judge Arthur W. Sinclair appointed Hoofnagle to serve out the rest of Babson's term on December 10, 1969, and Hoofnagle took office in January 1970.

Although Hoofnagle was a Democrat, his position as an employee of the Federal Government forbade him from holding partisan political office, so he renounced his party affiliation and became an independent.

It was as an independent that Hoofnagle sought election to the office of chairman in a special election held in November 1970. Running with the endorsement of the Fairfax County Democratic Committee, Hoofnagle defeated Republican Walter S. Boone.

Hoofnagle sought reelection as the chairman in 1971. Running unopposed, Hoofnagle was elected again in November 1971.

After only nine months into his term, Hoofnagle resigned from the Board of Supervisors. Although he publicly stated his reason for resigning was the need to travel for his job as an economist for the United States Department of Agriculture, he had privately stated his frustration with the limited power of the position, which allowed him to vote only on matters before the board in the case of a tie.
