= Kaye Dacus =

American author and editor

Kaye Dacus is an American author and editor who has been writing fiction for more than twenty years. Her first novel, Stand-In Groom, was published by Barbour Publishing with a release date of January 1, 2009. Subsequent titles in the Bonneterre Brides series are Menu for Romance (July 2009) and A Case for Love (Spring 2010).

== Background ==
Dacus was born Katherine Nell Dacus in Baton Rouge, Louisiana, in 1971. In 1972, her father, an officer in the U.S. Army, was transferred to Ft. Richardson in Anchorage, Alaska, where the family lived until 1975. From 1975 through 1989, the family lived in New Mexico. Dacus graduated from Las Cruces High School in May 1989. Immediately thereafter, she moved back to Baton Rouge to attend college at Louisiana State University. In 1992, shortly after Hurricane Andrew, Dacus withdrew from school and moved to Chantilly, Virginia, to live with her parents and work full-time. In 1996, Dacus moved to Nashville, Tennessee. From 1996 through 2006, she worked in the retail advertising department at The Tennessean newspaper. In 2006, she left the newspaper to work for Ideals Publications, a book publishing company, as an editor. Dacus and others were laid off from the publishing house in July 2008.

In May 2004, Dacus graduated from Trevecca Nazarene University with a Bachelor of Arts in English with a concentration on Professional Writing, as a part-time student while working full-time. After graduating, she immediately enrolled in graduate school. In June 2006, she received her Master of Arts in Writing Popular Fiction from Seton Hill University. Her thesis novel, Happy Endings Inc., became her first published novel, re-titled Stand-In Groom.

In 2001, Dacus joined American Christian Fiction Writers (then, American Christian Romance Writers). In 2004, she was elected to serve the organization as Volunteer Officer, and in 2005, she was elected to serve as Vice President of American Christian Fiction Writers. Due to time commitments from working full-time while also attending graduate school, Dacus resigned as Vice President in October 2005, after the national conference. Dacus is still an active member of ACFW as well as Romance Writers of America.

In 2004, along with three other authors, Dacus co-founded Middle Tennessee Christian Writers. Since then, Dacus has served as the organization's president. She also teaches a two-hour writing workshop at the group's monthly meeting.

In addition to being a multiply published author, Dacus works as a freelance editor.

== Published works ==
- Stand-In Groom, Barbour Publishing, 2008
- Menu for Romance, Barbour Publishing, 2009
- Ransome's Honor, Harvest House Publishers, 2009
- A Case for Love Barbour Publishing, 2010
- Ransome's Crossing, Harvest House Publishers, 2010
- Love Remains, Barbour Publishing, 2010
- Ransome's Quest, Harvest House Publishers, 2011
- The Art of Romance, Barbour Publishing, 2011
- Turnabout's Fair Play, Barbour Publishing, 2011
