= Jay Houston Hoofnagle =

American physician (born 1943)

- Born: 1943 (age 82–83)
- Education: Yale University, University of Virginia
- Known for: Use of interferon in treatment of hepatitis
- Awards: AASLD, Canadian Liver Foundation Gold Metal Award, NIH Director's Award, Hepatitis B Foundation Distinguished Scientist
- Scientific career
- Fields: Diseases of the liver
- Workplaces: National Institutes of Health

Jay Houston Hoofnagle is an American Doctor of Medicine. He is a leading expert in hepatotoxicity, hepatitis, cirrhosis and other diseases of the liver, and director of the Liver Disease Research Branch in the Division of Digestive Diseases and Nutrition at the National Institutes of Health.

Hoofnagle performed the first clinical trial on interferon for chronic hepatitis B. While it was believed that hepatitis was untreatable in the 1980s, Hoofnagle's trials at the National Institutes of Health using interferon during that period resulted in the first cures of hepatitis C infected patients. His graduate work is notable for elucidating serologic response to hepatitis infection and is included in many textbook descriptions of hepatitis infection as a classic piece of virology. Hoofnagle is the author of over 500 peer-reviewed articles on liver diseases, and his Scopus h-index as of August 2019 is 120.

== Career ==
Hoofnagle leads the Liver Disease Research Branch at NIDDK, and has done so since he was tapped for the position in 2003. In this capacity, Hoofnagle oversees the Drug-Induced Liver Injury Network and LiverTox, a database that provides "comprehensive and unbiased information about drug induced liver injury caused by prescription and nonprescription drugs, herbal and dietary supplements." Data produced from this network showed that dietary supplements account for nearly 20 percent of drug-induced liver injuries.

Prior to his current role, Hoofnagle was the Director of the Division of Digestive Diseases and Nutrition at the National Institute of Diabetes & Digestive & Kidney Diseases. Before joining the National Institutes of Health, he was a senior scientist at the Hepatitis Branch, Division of Blood and Blood Products, Food and Drug Administration. Commissioned in the United States Public Health Service in 1978, he rose to the rank of Captain before retirement from the Public Health Service and switch to Civil Service.

== Education and training ==
- Fellow in gastroenterology and hepatology, Virginia Hospital, Washington, D.C., 1976–78
- Medical residency, Virginia Hospital, Washington, D.C., 1975–76
- Staff fellow, Bureau of Biologics, Food and Drug Administration, Bethesda, Maryland, 1973–75
- Resident in internal medicine, University of Virginia Hospital, 1972
- Medical intern, University of Virginia Hospital, 1971
- M.D., Yale University, 1970
- BA, German Literature, University of Virginia, 1965

== Awards ==
- National Institutes of Health Director's Award 2013, For outstanding contributions to the development and implementation of the DHHS Action Plan for the Prevention, Care & Treatment of Viral Hepatitis
- Hepatitis B Foundation Distinguished Scientist 2003, for outstanding contributions to advancing out the Foundation's "Cause for a Cure."
- American Association for the Study of Liver diseases distinguished achievement award 2001
- Gold Medal from the Canadian Association for the Study of the Liver 2001, for contributions to liver disease research.

== Books ==
- Hoofnagle, Jay H., and T. Jake Liang. 2000. Hepatitis C: biomedical research reports. San Diego [ua]: Academic Press. The New England Journal of Medicine reviewed this work as, "an outstanding contribution to the challenging field of HCV infection. The editors have succeeded in their goal to 'illustrate that the marriage between basic science and clinical medicine is paramount in our ultimate success of controlling this global health problem.'"
- Jay H. Hoofnagle, Consensus Development Conference Management of Hepatitis B. 2009. NIH Consensus development conference management of Hepatitis B: October 20–22, 2008. Hoboken, New Jersey: Wiley Interscience.
- Hoofnagle, Jay H., and Zachary D. Goodman. 1991. Liver biopsy, interpretation for the 1990s: clinicopathologic correlations in liver disease (Chicago, Illinois): American Association for the Study of Liver Diseases.
- Hoofnagle, Jay Houston, and Mario Rizzetto. 1990. Management of chronic viral hepatitis: focus on INTRON A (interferon alfa 2b) (proceedings of a Symposium). Amsterdam: Elsevier.
- Hoofnagle, Jay H., and E. Anthony Jones. 1989. Interferon therapy of chronic viral hepatitis. New York: Thieme Medical Publishers.
- Hoofnagle, Jay H. 1981. Types A and B viral hepatitis. North Chicago, IL: Abbott Laboratories, Diagnostics Division.
- Hoofnagle, J.H. 1981. Serologic markers of hepatitis B virus infection. California: Annual Reviews.
