= Franklin Farm, Virginia =

- Census-designated place
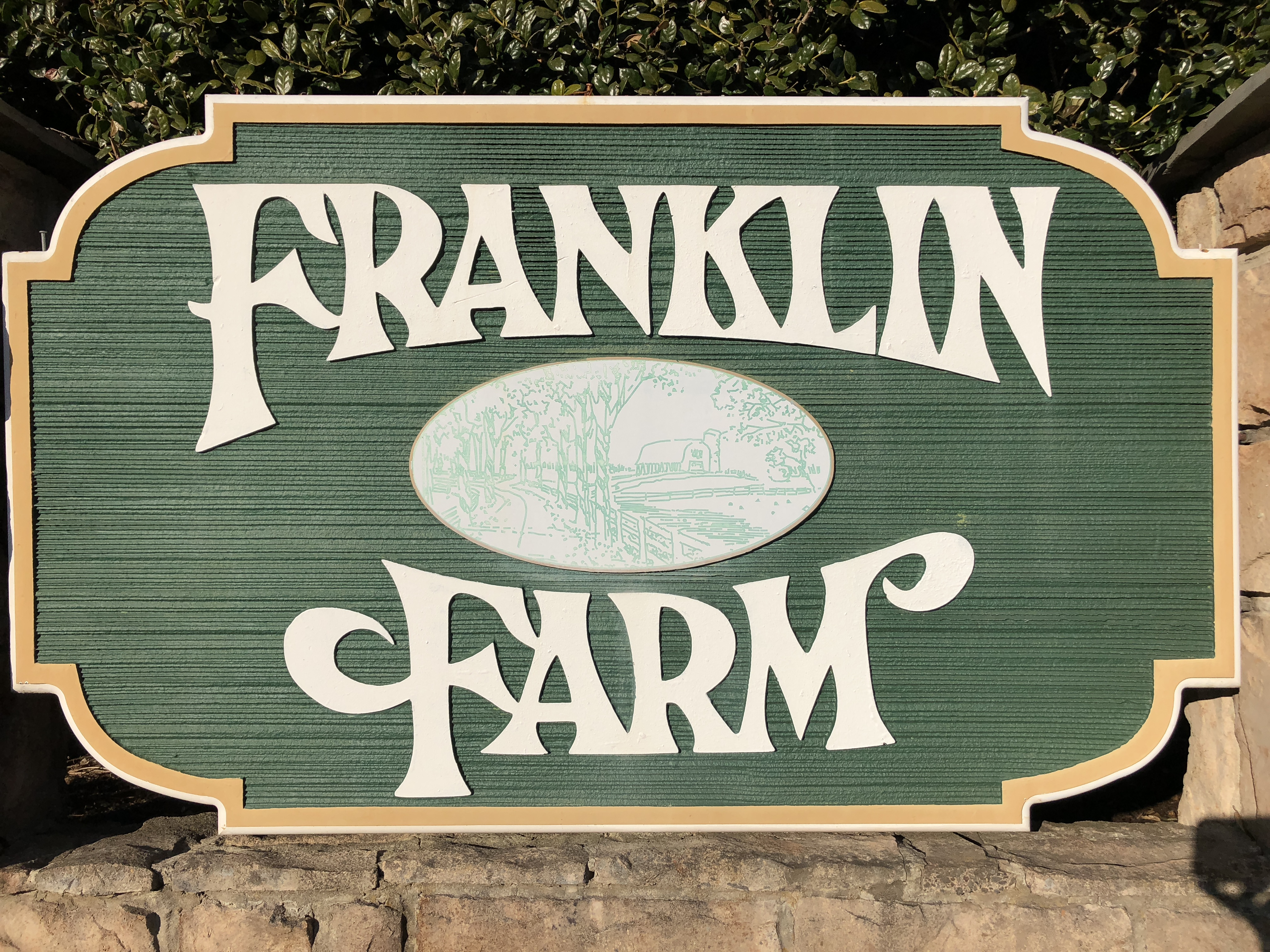
- Sign at the west entrance to Franklin Farm planned community

- Location within Northern Virginia Location within Virginia Location within the United States
- Coordinates: 38°54′25″N 77°24′05″W
- Country: United States
- State: Virginia
- County: Fairfax

Area
  - Total: 4.78 sq mi (12.38 km^{2})
  - Land: 4.75 sq mi (12.31 km^{2})
  - Water: 0.027 sq mi (0.07 km^{2})
- Elevation: 374 ft (114 m)

Population (2020)
  - Total: 19,189
  - Density: 4,037/sq mi (1,558.8/km^{2})
- Time zone: UTC−5 (Eastern (EST))
  - Summer (DST): UTC−4 (EDT)
- ZIP code: 20171
- FIPS code: 51-29628
- GNIS feature ID: 2584848

Franklin Farm refers to both a census-designated place (CDP) and a planned community located within the Oak Hill section of Fairfax County, Virginia, United States. It is a suburb of Washington, D.C., located about 20 miles west of the White House. At the 2020 census the CDP had a population of 19,189.

The planned community of Franklin Farm is located within the CDP. Covering slightly less than 30 percent of the CDP, the planned community occupies 1.32 square miles (850 acres) and contains 1,777 housing units. It was established in 1980 and features 13 miles of trails, six fishing ponds, six tennis courts, two swimming pools, 14 tot lots, three multipurpose courts, one sand volleyball court, and 180 acres of open space. The Fairfax County Parkway bisects the community. The Franklin Farm Foundation is the homeowner association with jurisdiction over the planned community.

As an unincorporated area, Franklin Farm's CDP boundaries are not officially defined by either a municipal government or by the government of Fairfax County, though the Franklin Farm Foundation does have specific boundaries.

== History ==
The namesake farm was purchased by airline pilot James Franklin in 1936, from a $10,000 sweepstakes winning. The farm expanded from 100 to 827 acres by 1979, before it was sold for development. The Franklin Farm community eventually included 1,777 homes in 27 neighborhoods.

== Demographics ==
Historical population
Census	Pop.	Note	%±
2010	19,288		—
2020	19,189		−0.5%
U.S. Decennial Census; 2010 2020

Franklin Farm was first listed as a census designated place in the 2010 U.S. census formed from part of Chantilly CDP and additional area.

=== Racial and ethnic composition ===
Franklin Farm CDP, Virginia – Racial and ethnic composition Note: the US Census treats Hispanic/Latino as an ethnic category. This table excludes Latinos from the racial categories and assigns them to a separate category. Hispanics/Latinos may be of any race.
Race / Ethnicity (NH = Non-Hispanic)	Pop 2010	Pop 2020	% 2010	% 2020
White alone (NH)	14,087	11,637	73.04%	60.64%
Black or African American alone (NH)	620	556	3.21%	2.90%
Native American or Alaska Native alone (NH)	31	7	0.16%	0.04%
Asian alone (NH)	2,986	4,639	15.48%	24.18%
Native Hawaiian or Pacific Islander alone (NH)	7	6	0.04%	0.03%
Other race alone (NH)	43	81	0.22%	0.42%
Mixed race or Multiracial (NH)	509	978	2.64%	5.10%
Hispanic or Latino (any race)	1,005	1,285	5.21%	6.70%
Total	19,288	19,189	100.00%	100.00%

=== 2020 census ===
As of the 2020 census, Franklin Farm had a population of 19,189. The median age was 42.2 years. 25.7% of residents were under the age of 18 and 13.1% of residents were 65 years of age or older. For every 100 females there were 101.0 males, and for every 100 females age 18 and over there were 97.8 males age 18 and over.

100.0% of residents lived in urban areas, while 0.0% lived in rural areas.

There were 6,160 households in Franklin Farm, of which 43.4% had children under the age of 18 living in them. Of all households, 78.6% were married-couple households, 7.3% were households with a male householder and no spouse or partner present, and 12.0% were households with a female householder and no spouse or partner present. About 9.5% of all households were made up of individuals and 4.2% had someone living alone who was 65 years of age or older.

There were 6,221 housing units, of which 1.0% were vacant. The homeowner vacancy rate was 0.2% and the rental vacancy rate was 3.2%.

Racial composition as of the 2020 census
Race	Number	Percent
White	11,898	62.0%
Black or African American	573	3.0%
American Indian and Alaska Native	26	0.1%
Asian	4,653	24.2%
Native Hawaiian and Other Pacific Islander	7	0.0%
Some other race	363	1.9%
Two or more races	1,669	8.7%
Hispanic or Latino (of any race)	1,285	6.7%

=== 2010 census ===
The Franklin Farm CDP, which was named for the older planned community contained within, had a population of 19,288 as of the 2010 census. The population was divided among 6,197 housing units, which were spread across 4.78 square miles (3,059 acres) of land.
