= Fairfax County Board of Supervisors =

Government entity of Fairfax County, Virginia

Type
- Type: Board of Supervisors

Leadership
- Chair: Jeff McKay (D)
- Vice Chair: Kathy Smith (D)

Structure
- Seats: 10
- Political groups: Governing party: Democratic (9); Opposition: Republican (1)
- Length of term: 4 years

Elections
- Next election: November 2, 2027

Meeting place
- Fairfax County Government Center; Fairfax County, Virginia, U.S.

Website
- Fairfax County Board

The Fairfax County Board of Supervisors, sometimes abbreviated as FCBOS, is the governing body of Fairfax County, Virginia, a county of over a million in Northern Virginia. The board has nine districts, and one at-large district which is always occupied by the Chair. Members may serve unlimited number of four-year terms, as there are no term limits.

The Board usually meets two Tuesdays every month in the Board Auditorium at the Fairfax County Government Center near Fairfax, Virginia. Members of the public are invited to attend these meetings.

The chair presides at all meetings, and has all of the powers of a member, including one vote. The chair, however, does not have the power to veto legislation. The Vice Chair is elected amongst the members annually at the first meeting of the year in January.

== Powers and responsibilities ==
Within the limits set forth by the Virginia General Assembly, the Board is responsible for setting local tax policy, approving land use plans and appointing officials to various county government positions, including a County Executive who prepares the annual budget and carries out ordinances enacted by the Board.

The Board also controls by its appointment power the board membership of several locally important authorities, including the Fairfax County Consumer Protection Commission, Fairfax County Economic Development Authority, the Fairfax County Park Authority, the Fairfax County Water Authority, and the Fairfax County Redevelopment and Housing Authority.

The Board exercises its taxation power primarily by setting the county's real property tax rate, which accounts for more than 63% of the general fund revenue. Other financially important tax rates set by the board include the personal property tax rate, which is applied to the value of vehicles in the county, and the business, professional and occupational license (BPOL) tax, which is applied to the gross receipts of businesses in the county.

== History ==
The Board of Supervisors was established in 1870.

Initially, the board had six members, one from each of the magisterial districts of Centreville, Dranesville, Falls Church, Lee, Mount Vernon and Providence, with the chairman elected from among the members of the board to a single year term.

In 1953, the county redistricted, forming the new Mason district from parts of the Falls Church, Lee and Mount Vernon districts and adding a seventh member to the board. Charles B. Runyon was elected to a special at-large seat on the Board of Supervisors in a special election held on November 4, 1953. The rather strange situation developed that there were now two supervisors from the Centreville and Lee districts, none from the Falls Church, Mount Vernon or Providence districts, and one supervisor at-large. This was remedied in the elections of 1955.

Confidence in the Board was greatly shaken in 1965 when Supervisors John P. Parrish and Stuart T. DeBell, as well as former Supervisors A. Claiborne Leigh, Robert C. Cotten and William H. Moss were indicted on bribery charges stemming from zoning cases that had come before the board. On October 2, 1966, Parrish had himself suspended from his Mount Vernon District seat, and Centreville Supervisor DeBell followed suit on October 26. Circuit Court Judge Paul E. Brown appointed Frank F. Everest, Jr, to replace Parrish on October 19 and, in one of his final acts, appointed C. Meade Stull to replace DeBell on November 4. Following Federal trials that saw Leigh, Cotten and Parrish convicted on bribery conspiracy charges, Commonwealth's Attorney Robert Horan declined to further press the state bribery charges in December 1969.

With the adoption of the urban county executive form of government in a 1966 referendum, the chairman became an at-large position directly elected by county voters with a four-year term. The county was again redistricted, with the Falls Church district abolished and the new Annandale and Springfield districts created, creating a nine-seat board.

Elected in November 1967 following a tough campaign against Mason District Supervisor Stanford Parris and a last minute write-in campaign mounted by supporters of Vienna Mayor James C. Martinelli, Frederick Babson was the first person to hold the newly created chairmanship, from 1968 to 1970.

Frustrated by the low pay of the office, Babson resigned from the Board in November 1969. Fairfax County Circuit Court Judge Arthur W. Sinclair appointed Fairfax County School Board member William S. Hoofnagle to serve out the rest of Babson's term on December 10, 1969, and Hoofnagle took office in January 1970.

Hoofnagle would be elected in November 1970 and again in November 1971 to a full four-year term, but resigned after nine months in September 1972, citing his need to travel in his position as an economist for the U.S. Department of Agriculture. Privately, Hoofnagle had stated his frustration with the limited power of the position, which allowed him to vote only on matters before the board in the case of a tie.

A special election was called to fill the chair for the remainder of Hoofnagle's term. In the November 1972 contest, Democrat Jean R. Packard emerged victorious from a crowded six-candidate field. Importantly, Fairfax County voters also overwhelmingly approved a referendum allowing the Chair to have a full vote, rather than merely acting as a tiebreaker.

It was to this newly empowered chairmanship that Republican Jack Herrity was elected in 1975 after serving a term as the supervisor from the Springfield district and the lone Republican on a board that was widely perceived as anti-development. Warren I. Cikins was elected to represent the Mount Vernon District. Cikins brought the Mount Vernon Ice Rink to reality, enhancing Ice Hockey's profile in the county and providing a practice facility for the NHL's Washington Capitals hockey team.

With the 1979 elections of Republican Nancy Falck in the Dranesville District and Democrat Sandra Duckworth in the Mount Vernon District, as well as the reelection of Audrey Moore, Martha Pennino and Marie Travesky in the Annandale, Centreville and Springfield districts, respectively, the nine member board for the first time had a female majority as of January 1980.

The resignation of Sandra Duckworth in August 1984 to follow her husband to Hawaii, where he had been named director of the Bishop Museum, cleared the way for a different majority to take over the Board of Supervisors. In the November 1984 special election, Republican T. Ferrell Egge capitalized on independent Gerald A. Fill's acting as a spoiler to Democrat Gerald W. Hyland, giving the Republicans a 5-4 majority on the Board. This was the first time in the 20th century that the Republicans held a majority of the seats on the Fairfax County Board of Supervisors.

Jack Herrity served as chairman during Fairfax County's growth during the 1980s, when the County, previously known as a quiet suburb of Washington, D.C.; became the high population center of the Dulles Technology Corridor that it is known as currently. During that period of growth, the Board advocated for the construction of Interstate 66 inside the Capital Beltway and for the Dulles Toll Road, as well as for a major expansion of Tysons Corner, Virginia, which now is home to many employers in the information technology industry.

In the 1991 redistricting, the Annandale District was renamed the Braddock District and the new Sully District was created in western Fairfax County, bringing the total number of seats on the board to ten.

The elections in November 1991 created a Republican majority on the board for only the second time in the 20th century, with Thomas Davis becoming the chairman, Robert B. Dix, Jr. defeating long-time Centreville District Supervisor Martha Pennino, and Republican candidates taking the open Dranesville, Sully and Mason district seats. Combining those victories with the reelection of Springfield Supervisor Elaine N. McConnell gave the Republicans a 6–4 majority.

The Centreville District, which had not actually contained Centreville since 1971, was renamed the Hunter Mill District in 1993, fulfilling a campaign promise of Supervisor Robert B. Dix, Jr.

The Board voted to make itself Virginia's first full-time local legislature in December 1993, subject to the approval of the Virginia General Assembly, which was not forthcoming.

Chairman Davis was elected to Congress in 1994 as the representative from Virginia's 11th district, which necessitated a special election to replace him. In the February 7 election, Democratic Providence District Supervisor Katherine Hanley defeated Republican Springfield District Supervisor Elaine McConnell, necessitating yet another special election to fill Hanley's seat. That election was won by Democrat Gerry Connolly, who defeated Republican Jeannemarie Devolites on March 28, 1995. Connolly's election created a 5-5 balance of Democrats to Republicans on the Board of Supervisors.

The regular elections of November 1995 saw the Mason District seat on the board change hands when Democratic candidate Penelope A. Gross defeated Republican William B. Bailey by 327 votes, reestablishing the Democratic majority on the board by a margin of 6 to 4.

In recent years, the chairmanship has acted as a stepping stone to higher political office: Gerry Connolly, the chairman from 2003 to 2007, served in the U.S. House of Representatives, as did Tom Davis, who was chairman from 1991 to 1994. Katherine Hanley, who served from 1995 to 2003, served as Secretary of the Commonwealth of Virginia from 2006 to 2010

=== Pay history ===
While the position of supervisor is technically a part-time job, many supervisors devote 40 or more hours a week to fulfill all of their obligations. A December 1993 vote by the Board of Supervisors to officially make itself a full-time body was rebuffed by the Virginia General Assembly.

In January 1968, the Board of Supervisors voted themselves a $2,500 pay raise, increasing their yearly salaries to $10,000. The annual salary increased to $15,000 per year in January 1976.

At their meeting on April 14, 1986, the Board voted 5–4 to increase their salaries from $21,589 to $35,000 per year. The approved plan also included automatic pay raises through 1991 to an eventual total of $45,000.

The Board voted to increase the pay of its members from $45,000 to $59,000 per year in September 1998 by a vote of 6–3–1, with Hunter Mill Supervisor Robert B. Dix abstaining.

In 2007, the board voted to increase the pay of members from $59,000 to $75,000 per year.

In March 2015, the Board voted 6–4 to increase the pay of future supervisors by $20,000 per year, to $95,000, with the chairman earning $100,000 per year.

In March 2023, the Board voted 8–2 to increase the pay of future supervisors by 30%. This adjustment would turn annual salaries from $90,000 to $123,283 for supervisors and from $100,000 to $133,283 for the chairman. Citizens spent hours protesting this raise during the meeting in which the raise was voted on.

== Membership ==
The board is currently controlled by a Democratic majority, along with the lone Republican Pat Herrity. Democrats hold nine out of the ten seats, and currently control both the Chairmanship and Vice Chairmanship. The board districts are divided so as to give every member an equal population to represent. The current districts and their Supervisors are:

Fairfax County Board of Supervisors (2024–2027)
Name	Party	First elected	District
Jeff McKay, Chairman	Dem	2019	At-Large
Rachna Sizemore Heizer	Dem	2025	Braddock
Jimmy Bierman	Dem	2023	Dranesville
Rodney Lusk	Dem	2019	Franconia
Walter Alcorn	Dem	2019	Hunter Mill
Andres Jimenez	Dem	2023	Mason
Daniel Storck	Dem	2015	Mount Vernon
Dalia Palchik	Dem	2019	Providence
Pat Herrity	Rep	2007	Springfield
Kathy Smith	Dem	2015	Sully

== See also ==
- Board of supervisors
- Fairfax County Government Center
