= List of University of San Francisco School of Law alumni =

This is a list of notable alumni of the University of San Francisco School of Law.

== Academia ==
- Ifeoma Ajunwa (2007), writer and professor at the University of North Carolina School of Law
- Edward Imwinkelried (1969), evidence scholar and professor at UC Davis School of Law
- Thomas Nazario (1975), noted professor, lawyer, and scholar of human rights and international children's rights

== Arts, entertainment, and journalism ==
- Cupcake Brown (2001), author and lawyer, wrote A Piece of Cake: A Memoir
- Emily Compagno (2006), attorney, TV host, former National Football League cheerleader, Fox News Channel contributor
- John Corcoran, speechwriter for the governor of California and White House staffer
- Jeff Gottesfeld (1981), novelist and television writer
- Kimberly Guilfoyle (1994), former assistant San Francisco district attorney and television personality
- Gini Graham Scott (1990), author
- Dick Spotswood (1973), journalist and politician

== Athletics ==
- Tatiana Lysenko (2005), Ukrainian gold medalist at the 1992 Summer Olympics and world champion gymnast
- Marcus McElhenney (2014), lawyer and bronze medalist at the 2008 Summer Olympics
- Juliet Starrett (2003), two-time whitewater rafting world champion and CEO of CrossFit San Francisco
- Andy Wolfe, lawyer and noted college basketball player

== Business ==
- Byington Ford (did not graduate), noted real estate developer
- Hekani Jakhalu Kense, businesswoman and social entrepreneur
- Lloyd Levitin (1961), businessman and professor
- Marjorie Scardino (1975), CEO of Pearson PLC, and the first woman to head a top 100 firm on the London Stock Exchange

== Government and politics ==
=== Members of Congress ===
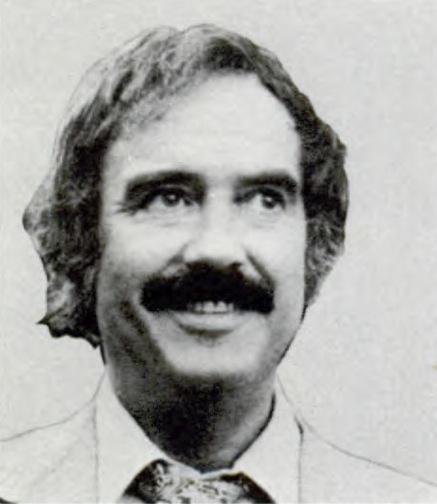
John Burton

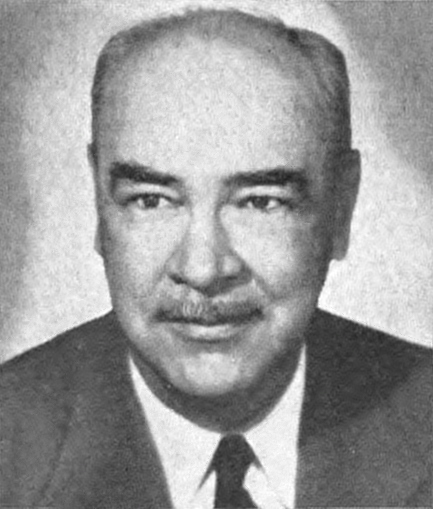
John F. Shelley

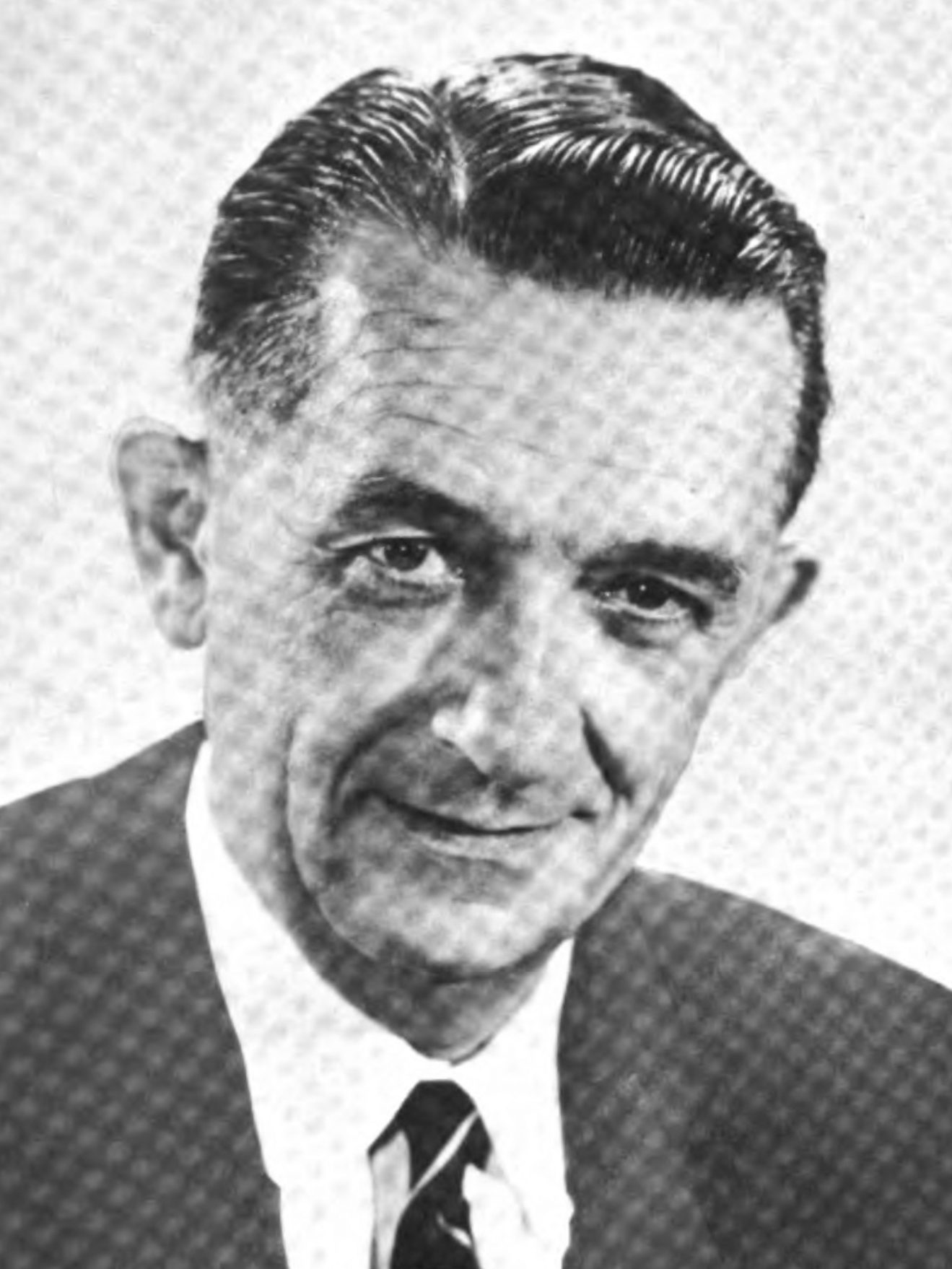
Thomas C. Lynch

- John Burton (1960), long-serving politician, member of the United States House of Representatives (1974–1983), California State Assembly (1965–1974; 1988–1996); California State Senate (1996–2004); and chair of the California Democratic Party (1973–1974; 2009–2017)
- John F. Shelley (1932), member of the United States House of Representatives (1949–1964), mayor of San Francisco (1964–1968), member of the California State Senate (1939–1947)

=== Members of state legislatures ===
- Randy Iwase (1974), member of the Hawaii Senate (1990–2000)
- Susan C. Lee (1982), member of the Maryland House of Delegates (2002–2015) and Maryland Senate (2015–present)
- J. Eugene McAteer, member of the California Senate (1959–1967)
- Bill Monning (1976), member of the California State Assembly (2008–2012) and California State Senate (2012–2020)
- Arthur Ohnimus (1921), chief clerk of the California State Assembly (1923–1937; 1941–1967)
- Frank S. Petersen (1951), member of the California Senate (1963–1967) and judge on the Del Norte County Superior Court (1966–1988)
- Terrance W. H. Tom, member of the Hawaii House of Representatives (1982–1998)

=== Federal offices ===
- Patricia A. Shiu (1982), Director of the Office of Federal Contract Compliance Programs (2009–2016)

=== State and territorial executive offices ===
- Ron Knecht (1995), Nevada state controller (2015–2019) and member of the Nevada Assembly (2002–2004)
- Sylvia Luke (1995), 16th lieutenant governor of Hawaii (2022–present) and member of the Hawaii House of Representatives (1999–2022)
- Thomas C. Lynch (1929), 25th attorney general of California (1964–1971) and district attorney of San Francisco (1951–1964)
- Leo T. McCarthy (1958), lieutenant governor of California (1983–1995); member and Speaker of the California State Assembly (1969–1982); member of the San Francisco Board of Supervisors (1964–1968)
- Bill Schuette (1979), Michigan attorney general (2011–2019), member of the United States House of Representatives (1985–1991), and justice of the Michigan Court of Appeals (2003–2009)
- Faoa Aitofele Sunia (1975), lieutenant governor of American Samoa (2003–2013)

=== Municipal and local offices ===
- Angela Alioto (1983), civil rights attorney and member of the San Francisco Board of Supervisors (1989–1997)
- Mike Guingona, member of the Daly City, California City Council (1993–2018)
- Michael Hennessey (1973), long-serving sheriff of the City and County of San Francisco (1980–2012)
- John C. Houlihan, mayor of Oakland (1961–1966)
- Suzy Loftus (2005), interim district attorney of San Francisco (2019–2020)
- William J. Quinn (1925), chief of the San Francisco Police Department (1929–1940)
- Katy Tang (2017), member and president of the San Francisco Board of Supervisors (2013–2019)
- Joseph E. Tinney (1933), member of the San Francisco Board of Supervisors (1961–1966) and San Francisco City Assessor (1966–1979)
- Brendon Woods (1996), public defender of Alameda County, California (2012–present)

== Judicial and legal figures ==
According to the university's website, as of 2025 over 340 alumni have been appointed or elected as judges.

=== National supreme court justices ===
- Daniel Foley (1974), justice of the Supreme Court of Palau (2013–present) and Hawaii Intermediate Court of Appeals (2000–2016)

=== Federal judges ===
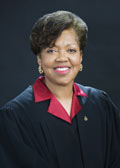
Saundra Brown Armstrong

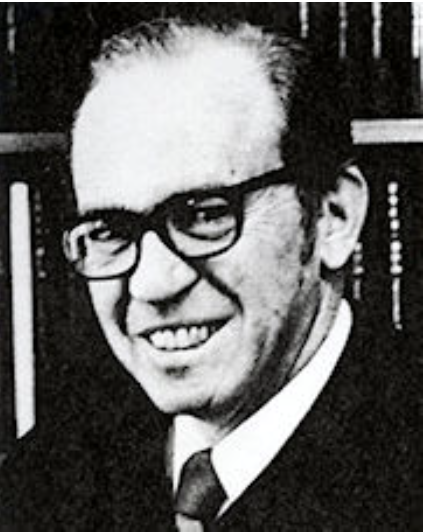
Roger D. Foley

- Saundra Brown Armstrong (1977), judge on the U.S. District Court, Northern District of California (1991–present)
- Roger D. Foley (1946), former long-serving chief judge on the United States District Court for the District of Nevada (1962–1996) and attorney general of Nevada (1959–1962)
- David Warner Hagen (1959), former judge on United States District Court for the District of Nevada (1993–2005)
- George Bernard Harris (1926), former judge on the United States District Court for the Northern District of California (1946–1983) and San Francisco Municipal Court (1941–1946)
- Edward Joseph Schwartz (1939), former judge and chief judge of the United States District Court for the Southern District of California (1968–2000)
- William Thomas Sweigert (1923), former judge on the United States District Court for the Northern District of California (1959–1983) and the San Francisco County Superior Court (1949–1959)

=== State supreme court justices ===
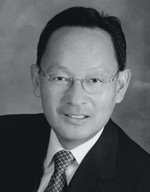
Ming Chin

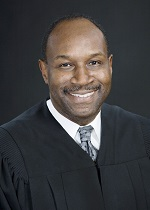
Martin Jenkins

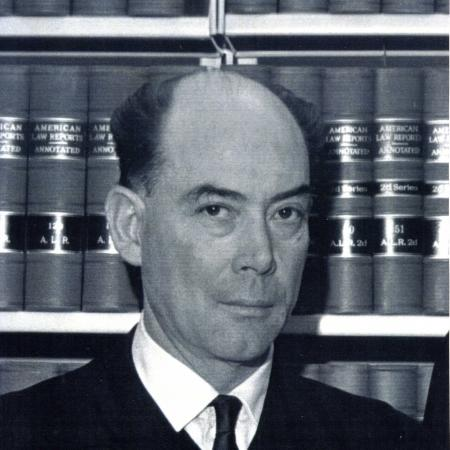
Buell A. Nesbett

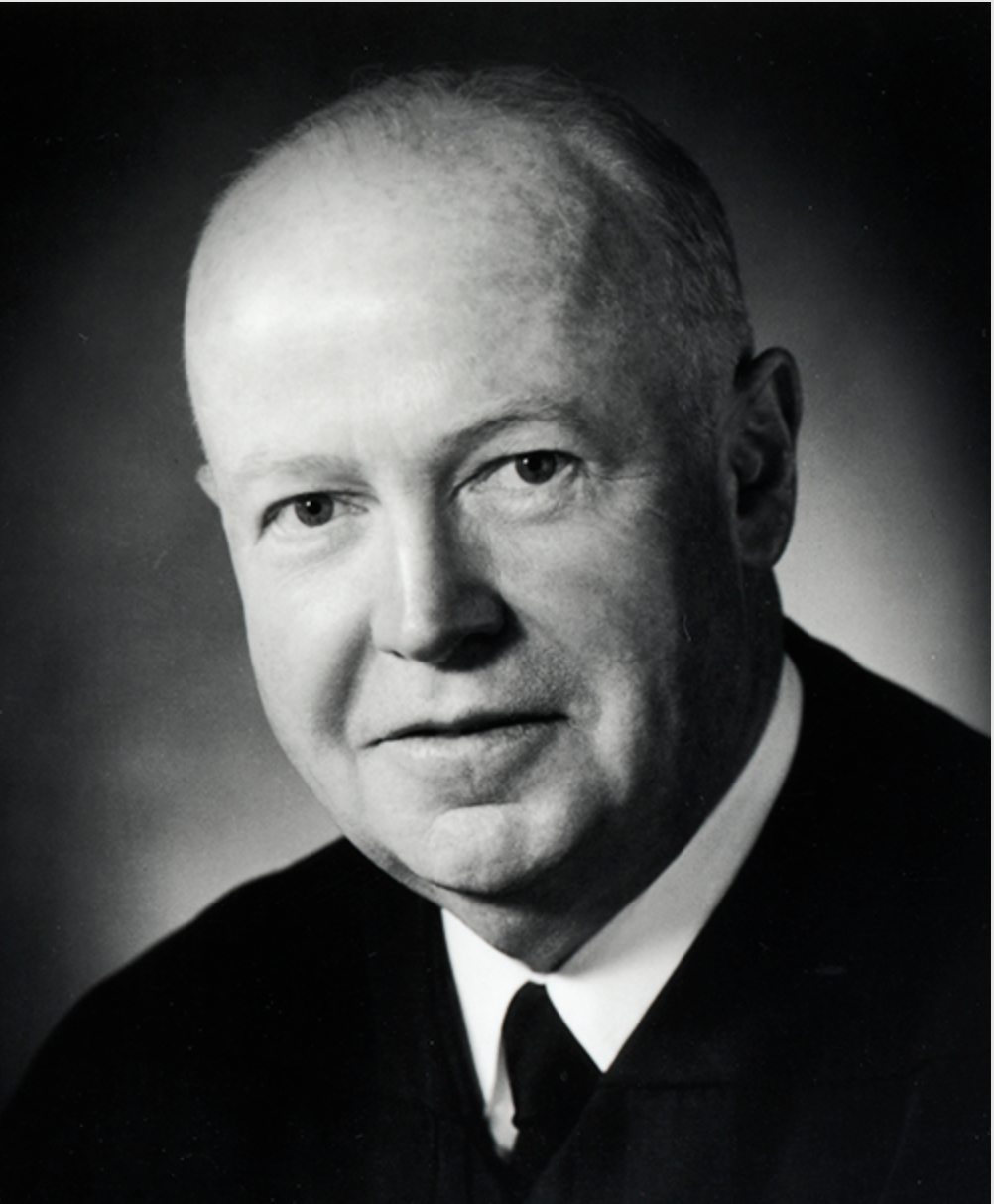
Raymond L. Sullivan

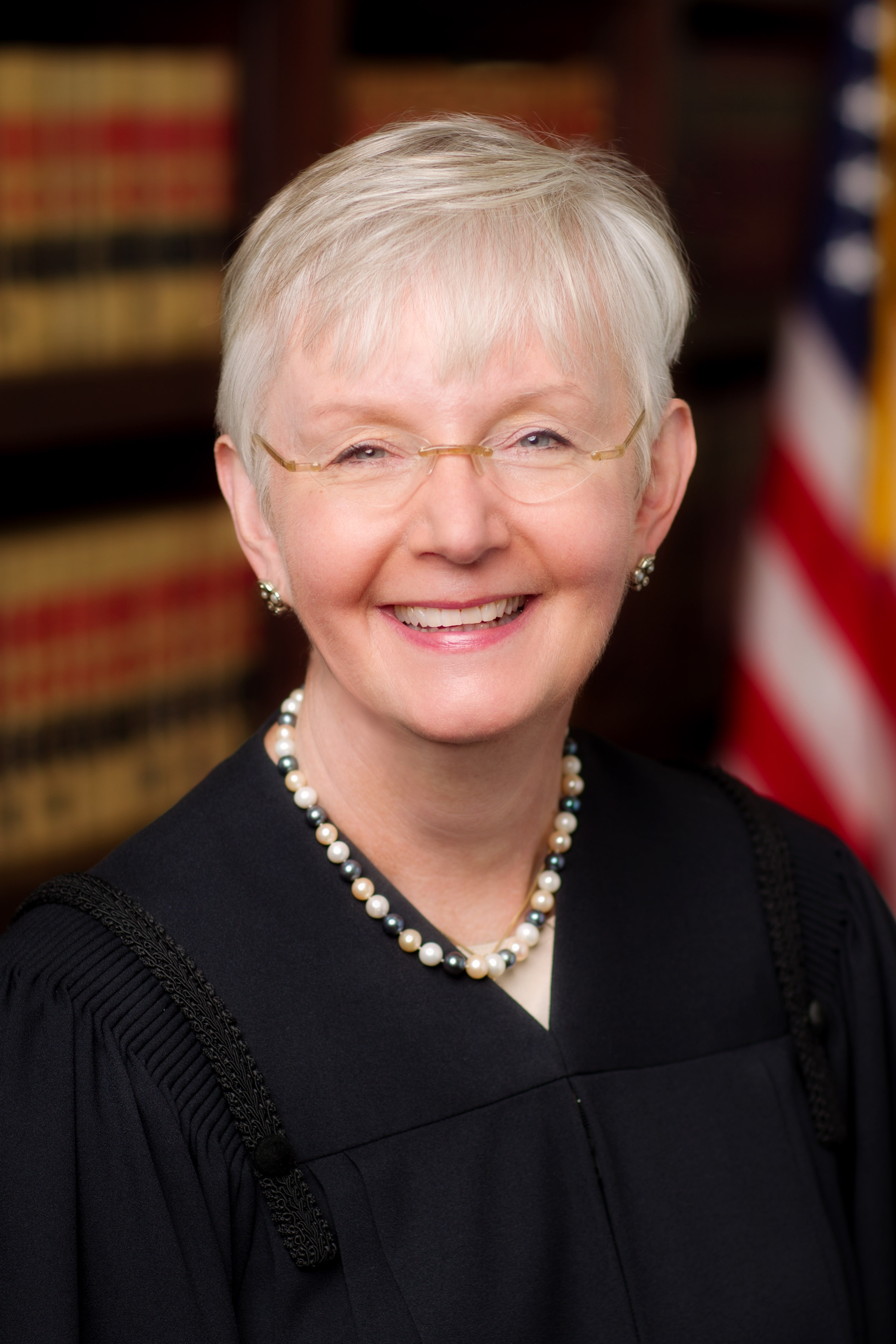
Mary Jane Theis

- Ming Chin (1967), former justice of the Supreme Court of California (1996–2020)
- Martin Jenkins (1980), justice of the Supreme Court of California (2020–present), California Courts of Appeal (2008–2019), and United States District Court for the Northern District of California (1997–2008)
- Buell A. Nesbett (1940), former justice and first chief justice of the Alaska Supreme Court (1959–1970)
- Raymond L. Sullivan (1930), former justice of the Supreme Court of California (1966–1977) and California Courts of Appeal (1961–1966)
- Mary Jane Theis (1974), justice and chief justice of the Supreme Court of Illinois (2010–present)

=== State appellate court justices ===
- Robert F. Kane (1952), former justice of the California Courts of Appeal (1971–1979), San Mateo County Superior Court (1969–1971), and the United States Ambassador to Ireland (1984–1985)
- James Ward (1959), justice of the California Courts of Appeal (1996–present)

=== Federal offices ===
- Kevin V. Ryan (1984), former United States Attorney for the Northern District of California (2002–2007)

=== Other legal figures ===
- Tom Asimou (1998), lawyer specializing in missing persons cases
- Thomas Anthony Durkin (1973), criminal defense attorney
- Vincent Hallinan (1921), lawyer and political candidate
- Jay Leiderman (1999), criminal defense attorney
- Mark Massara (1987), environmental lawyer and activist
- Karen Parker (1983), human rights lawyer
- Chan Chung Wing (1918), immigration lawyer and the first Chinese American lawyer in California

== Military ==
- Frederick J. Kenney (1991), rear admiral and former Judge Advocate General of the United States Coast Guard
