= Linda Smyth =

American politician

Member of the Fairfax County Board of Supervisors from the Providence district
- In office December 15, 2003 – January 2020
- Preceded by: Gerry Connolly
- Succeeded by: Dalia Palchik

Personal details
- Born: July 25, 1949 (age 77) Cape Girardeau, Missouri, U.S.
- Party: Democratic
- Spouse: Nigel S. Smyth
- Children: Sefton K. Smyth
- Education: Washington University in St. Louis; University of Virginia
- Website: lindasmyth.com

Linda Q. Smyth is a former member of the Fairfax County Board of Supervisors for the Providence district, serving from 2003 until her retirement after the 2019 election in which she was succeeded by school board member Dalia Palchik.

== Career ==
Smyth has been a resident of Fairfax County, Virginia since 1972.

In 1999, Providence District Supervisor Gerry Connolly appointed Smyth to the Fairfax County Planning Commission to replace attorney Carl A. S. Coan, Jr.

When Connolly decided to run for Chairman of the Board of Supervisors following Katherine Hanley's decision to not seek a second term in 2003, Smyth decided to seek the Providence District seat he would be vacating.

At the Democratic caucus held in May 2003, Smyth, backed by Connolly, defeated slow growth advocate Becky Cate, who was supported by former Board Chairman Audrey Moore, and Pat Morrison.

She was elected to her first term as Supervisor for the Providence District in November 2003, defeating Republican James E. Hyland, and sworn in on December 15, 2003.

Unhappiness with development projects in Smyth's Providence District, such as in Tysons Corner and the Merrifield-Dunn Loring neighborhood, as well as the development of the MetroWest planned community near the Vienna Metro station, led to community activist Charles W. Hall challenging Smyth in the 2007 Democratic primary. Smyth defeated Hall in the June primary, and went on to run unopposed in the November 2007 election.

Smyth was elected to her third four-year term in November 2011, defeating Republican Chris S. Grisafe.

Currently, Smyth chairs the Board of Supervisors' Technology Committee.

In addition, Smyth is on the Board of Directors of the Virginia Association of Counties and serves on the Metropolitan Washington Council of Governments Transportation Planning Board and Metropolitan Washington Air Quality Committee, and the Northern Virginia Regional Commission.
