= Senator Eggleston =

Senator Eggleston may refer to:

- Alan Eggleston (1941–2025), Senate of Australia
- Benjamin Eggleston (1816–1888), Ohio State Senate
- David Q. Eggleston (1857–1909), Virginia State Senate
- John W. Eggleston (1886–1976), Virginia State Senate
