= Charles E. James Sr. =

American politician

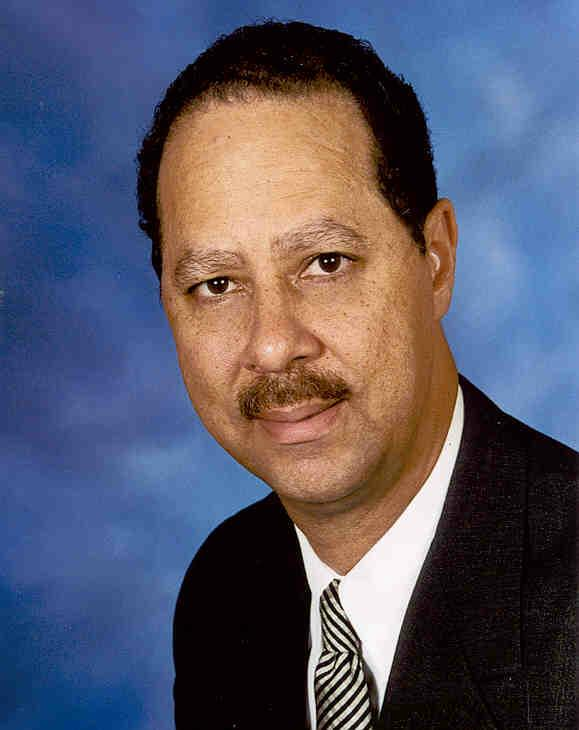
- James in 2001

Director of the Office of Federal Contract Compliance
- In office June 1, 2001 – January 20, 2009
- Preceded by: Shirley J. Wilcher
- Succeeded by: Patricia A. Shiu

Personal details
- Party: Republican
- Spouse: Kay Coles James
- Children: 3

Charles E. James Sr. was the Deputy Assistant Secretary of the Office of Federal Contract Compliance Programs from 2001 to 2009 during the administration of George W. Bush.

He returned to the federal government in 2017 to direct the Office of Civil Rights at the United States Department of Transportation.

== Personal ==
His wife, Kay Coles James, served as the director for the United States Office of Personnel Management from 2001 to 2005 in the George W. Bush administration. He is the father of three grown children.

== See also ==
- List of OFCCP DAS
