= Gerry Connolly =

American politician (1950–2025)

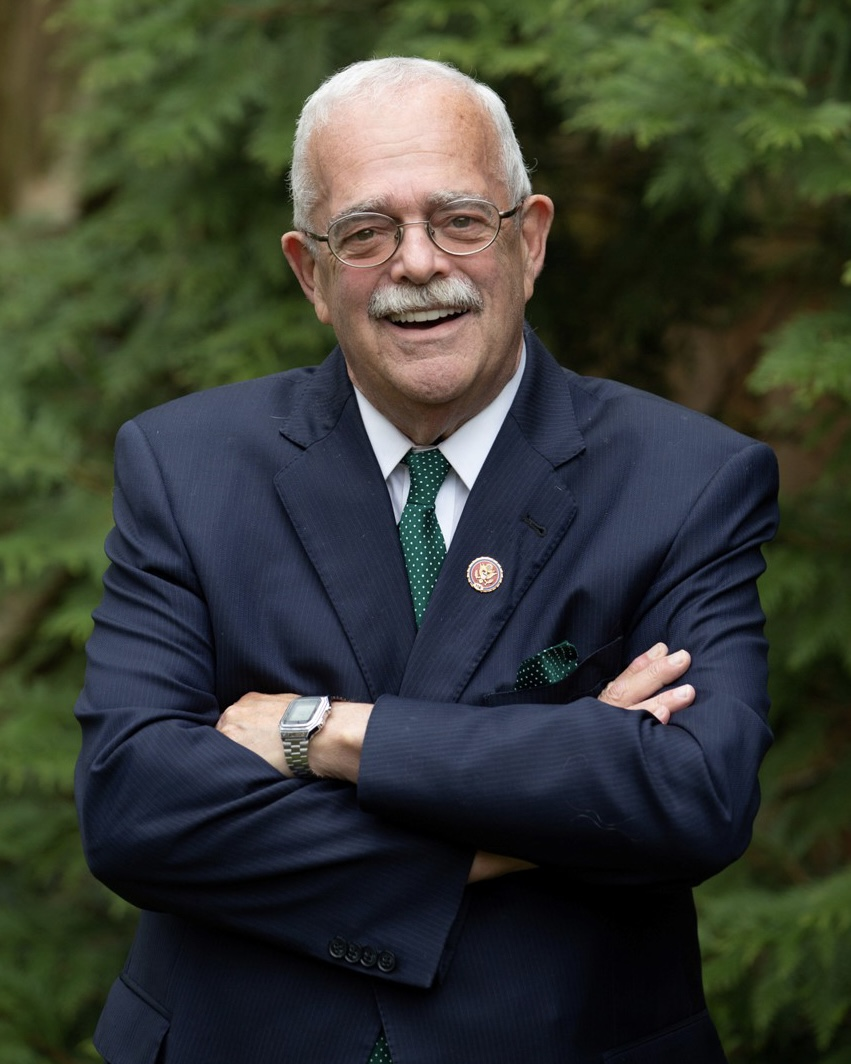
- Official portrait, 2022

Ranking Member of the House Oversight Committee
- In office January 3, 2025 – May 21, 2025; On leave: April 28, 2025 – May 21, 2025
- Preceded by: Jamie Raskin
- Succeeded by: Stephen Lynch (acting)

President of the NATO Parliamentary Assembly
- In office June 21, 2024 – November 25, 2024; Acting
- Preceded by: Michał Szczerba
- Succeeded by: Marcos Perestrello
- In office November 23, 2020 – November 28, 2022
- Preceded by: Attila Mesterházy
- Succeeded by: Joëlle Garriaud-Maylam

Member of the U.S. House of Representatives from Virginia's 11th district
- In office January 3, 2009 – May 21, 2025
- Preceded by: Tom Davis
- Succeeded by: James Walkinshaw

Chair of the Fairfax County Board of Supervisors
- In office December 15, 2003 – January 2, 2009
- Preceded by: Kate Hanley
- Succeeded by: Sharon Bulova

Member of the Fairfax County Board of Supervisors from the Providence district
- In office March 28, 1995 – December 15, 2003
- Preceded by: Kate Hanley
- Succeeded by: Linda Smyth

Personal details
- Born: Gerald Edward Connolly; March 30, 1950 Boston, Massachusetts, U.S.
- Died: May 21, 2025 (aged 75) Mantua, Virginia, U.S.
- Party: Democratic
- Spouse: Cathy Smith (m. 1973)
- Children: 1
- Education: Maryknoll College (BA); Harvard University (MPA)
- Connolly's voice Connolly on the President's authority to launch war on the Islamic State. Recorded September 17, 2014

Gerald Edward Connolly (March 30, 1950 – May 21, 2025) was an American politician who served as the U.S. representative for Virginia's 11th congressional district from 2009 until his death in 2025. A member of the Democratic Party, he was first elected in 2008 to replace retiring Republican incumbent Tom Davis, who did not seek re-election and later resigned shortly after the election. The 11th district is situated in the suburbs of Northern Virginia. It is anchored in the affluent Fairfax County, where Connolly served on the county's board of supervisors before his election to Congress, and also includes the entirety of Fairfax City.

In April 2025, Connolly announced that he would not seek re-election in 2026 citing health concerns. He died in office on May 21, 2025, following treatment for esophageal cancer.

== Early life and education ==
Connolly was born in Boston on March 30, 1950, the son of Mary Therese (née O'Kane), a nurse, and Edward R. Connolly, an insurance salesman. He graduated from Maryknoll Junior Seminary (nicknamed Venard) High School in Clarks Summit, Pennsylvania, in 1968. In 1971, he graduated from Maryknoll College in Glen Ellyn, Illinois, with a Bachelor of Arts in literature, and completed a Master of Public Administration from the Harvard Kennedy School in 1979.

== Career ==
=== U.S. Senate Committee on Foreign Relations ===
Connolly worked from 1979 to 1989 with the United States Senate Committee on Foreign Relations, where he managed committee oversight of international economic issues, international narcotics control, and United Nations and Middle East policies, and published reports on U.S. policy in El Salvador, Central America, Israel, and the Persian Gulf region. From 1989 to 1997, he was Vice President of the Washington Office of SRI International. He was also Director of Community Relations for SAIC (Science Applications International Corporation).

In local politics, Connolly served as Providence District Supervisor for nine years, first elected in 1995.

=== Fairfax County Board of Supervisors ===
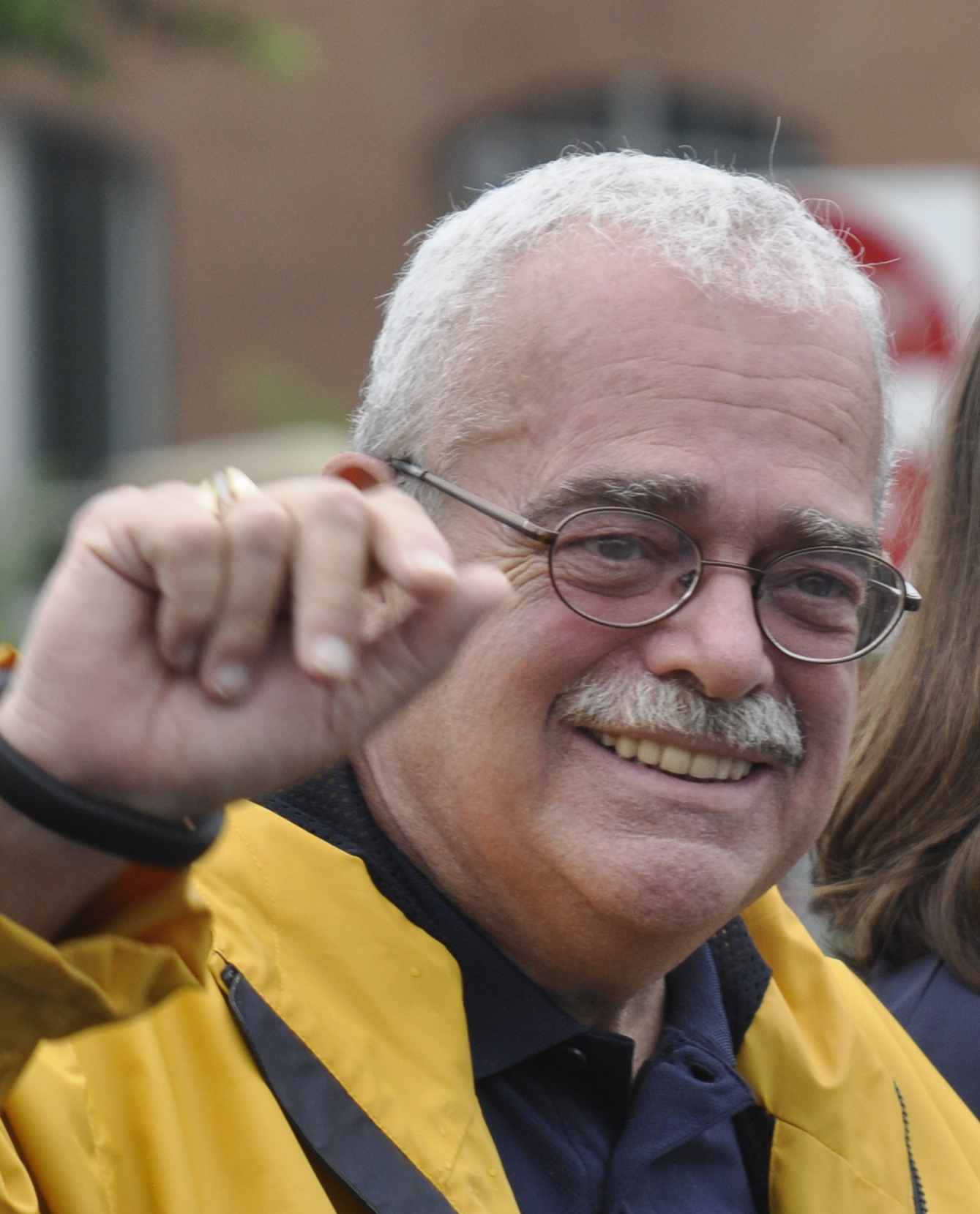
Connolly during 2015 Fairfax City Independence Day parade

Connolly's career as a public official began on March 28, 1995, when he won a special election for the Providence District seat on the Fairfax County Board of Supervisors, defeating Republican Jeannemarie A. Devolites. A rematch against Devolites in November of that same year saw Connolly reelected to a full four-year term on the board. Connolly ran unopposed for reelection in November 1999. He was elected Chairman of the Fairfax County Board of Supervisors in 2003 and reelected in 2007.

As chairman of the ten-member board, Connolly balanced a $4.5 billion budget and managed a county that would be the nation's 13th-largest city, 12th-largest school district, and sixth-largest office market. He served as chairman of the county's Legislative Committee and vice-chair of the Economic Advisory Committee. Connolly also served as chairman of the board of the Northern Virginia Transportation Commission (NVTC), chairman of the Northern Virginia Regional Commission (NVRC), and was chairman of the board of the Metropolitan Washington Council of Governments (MWCOG). He also represented Fairfax County on the board of the Virginia Association of Counties (VaCo), where he also served as president.

== U.S. House of Representatives ==
=== Committee assignments ===
- Committee on the Budget (2009–2011)
- Committee on Foreign Affairs (2009–2025)
  - Subcommittee on the Middle East and South Asia (2009–2025)
  - Subcommittee on Terrorism, Nonproliferation, and Trade (2011–2013)
  - Subcommittee on Asia and the Pacific (2013–2025)
- Committee on Oversight and Reform (2009–2025; Ranking Member, 2025)
  - Subcommittee on Federal Workforce, Post Office, and the District of Columbia (2011–2013)
  - Subcommittee on Government Management, Organization, and Procurement (2011–2013)
  - Subcommittee on Government Operations (chairman; 2013–2025)
  - Subcommittee on Economic Growth, Job Creation and Regulatory Affairs (2013–2025)
- U.S. Delegation to NATO Parliamentary Assembly (chairman; 2013–2025)

=== Caucus memberships ===
- Black Maternal Health Caucus
- American Sikh Congressional Caucus
- Congressional Arts Caucus
- Congressional Taiwan Caucus (co-chair)
- Congressional Cloud Computing Caucus (co-chair)
- Congressional Cement Caucus
- New Democrat Coalition
- House Baltic Caucus
- Congressional Asian Pacific American Caucus
- U.S.–Japan Caucus
- Congressional Solar Caucus
- Congressional Caucus for the Equal Rights Amendment
- Congressional Caucus on Turkey and Turkish Americans
- Congressional Ukraine Caucus
- Congressional Wildlife Refuge Caucus
- United States–China Working Group
- Rare Disease Caucus

=== Legislation sponsored ===
Federal Information Technology Acquisition Reform Act (H.R. 1232; 113th Congress) As the ranking member of the House Committee on Oversight and Government Reform, Connolly co-sponsored this bill with Darrell Issa. It is a proposed bill that would make changes and reforms to the current framework that manages how the federal government buys new technology. One of the requirements would be that the government develop a streamlined plan for its acquisitions. The bill would increase the power of existing chief information officers (CIO) within federal agencies so that they could be more effective. Each agency would also be reduced to having only one CIO in the agency, who is then responsible for the success and failure of all IT projects in that agency. The bill would also require the federal government to make use of private sector best practices. The bill is intended to reduce IT procurement related waste. Explaining the bill, Connolly said that "there are more than 250 identified CIOs in the federal government, yet none possess the necessary authority to effectively manage IT investments" which has "resulted in duplicative and wasteful IT spending." It passed the House in a voice vote on February 25, 2014.

Government Reports Elimination Act of 2014 (H.R. 4194; 113th Congress) As the ranking member of the House Committee on Oversight and Government Reform, Connolly co-sponsored this bill with Darrell Issa. It is a proposed bill that would eliminate approximately 100 required federal agency reports that are considered redundant or wasteful. Connolly argued that "in today's challenging fiscal environment, it is incumbent that we leverage every opportunity to streamline or eliminate antiquated agency reporting requirements that are duplicative, irrelevant or simply ignored." The bill passed in the House in a voice vote on April 28, 2014.

In the 117th United States Congress, the Center for Effective Lawmaking's legislative effectiveness scores ranked Connolly as the most effective legislator.

== Political positions ==
Connolly voted with President Joe Biden's stated position 100% of the time, according to FiveThirtyEight analysis completed in January 2023.

=== Abortion ===
Connolly supported abortion rights. He voted against the Stupak Amendment to the Affordable Care Act, which placed stringent limits on health insurance companies offering abortion services. During the budget amendments process in 2011, he voted against an amendment that would have prevented taxpayer funds from going to Planned Parenthood.

=== Civil liberties ===
Connolly voted for the National Defense Authorization Act for Fiscal Year 2012 regarding funding the US Armed Forces, including the paychecks delivered to soldiers but also including a controversial provision that allows the government and the military to detain anyone "who was part of or substantially supported al-Qaeda, the Taliban, or associated forces that are engaged in hostilities against the United States or its coalition partners", and anyone who commits a "belligerent act" against the United States or its coalition allies in aid of such enemy forces, under the law of war, "without trial, until the end of the hostilities authorized by the Authorization of Use of Military Force." The law would not grant new powers to the President but does codify federal court rulings on this issue and the detainment of unlawful combatants until hostilities are over is in accordance to the Geneva Conventions.

=== Economics ===
Connolly voted for the American Recovery and Reinvestment Act of 2009, the Omnibus Appropriations Act, 2009, the supplemental appropriations bill that established Cash for Clunkers, and the Cash for Clunkers Extension. Additionally, he voted for all of the 2010 governmental appropriations bills, and he voted for the Continuing Appropriations Act for 2011. He voted against some large spending bills, including the release of $350 billion in bank bailout funds and a $154 billion spending bill because of concerns these would add to the federal deficit.

He was a cosponsor of pay-as-you-go (PAYGO) budget legislation that was signed into law in February 2010.

In May 2011, Connolly voted to increase the debt ceiling, but the measure failed by a significant margin. It was his third such vote.

Connolly was among the 46 Democrats who voted against final passage of the Fiscal Responsibility Act of 2023 in the House.

=== Energy ===
Connolly voted in favor of the American Clean Energy and Security Act of 2009, saying it would strengthen national security while spurring innovation in the energy industry. In 2010, he voted in favor of ending a moratorium on deepwater drilling rigs that met certain safety standards. Connolly was one of the 35 congressmen who founded the Sustainable Energy and Environment Coalition.

=== LGBT issues ===
Connolly supported gay rights. He campaigned against the Marshall-Newman Amendment to the Virginia Constitution, which banned all gay unions from being performed or recognized in Virginia. In Congress, he voted in favor of repealing the contentious "Don't Ask, Don't Tell" law that prohibited gays from serving openly in the military. He co-sponsored bills that would repeal portions of the Defense of Marriage Act—a federal law that had effectively banned same-sex marriage across the country.

=== Guns ===
While on the Board of Supervisors for Fairfax County, Connolly sponsored an ordinance that would have made it illegal to transport a loaded shotgun in the back of one's car. In Congress, Connolly signed on to a measure that would have closed the gun show loophole by requiring that private sellers of firearms at gun shows engage in the same background check and reporting requirements as registered firearms dealers. Connolly opposed allowing concealed weapons in schools and on college campuses.

In November 2011, Connolly voted against the National Right to Carry Reciprocity Act, which would have exempted non-residents of states that prohibit concealed weapons from those restrictions.

=== Health care ===
In 2009, Connolly was an early supporter of the Democratic health care plan, which ultimately became the America's Affordable Health Choices Act, as well as the public health insurance option, saying at a live chat with constituents in September to a woman from Washington, D.C. that "One of my principles for health care reform is that it increases the choices you have. By setting up a health insurance exchange, we can give your family more insurance choices, hopefully including one that your daughter's doctor chooses to accept". Connolly voted against the Stupak-Pitts Amendment, and in 2010 for the America's Affordable Health Choices Act.

Connolly cited deficit reduction in explaining his health care vote.

=== Marijuana ===
Connolly supported rescheduling marijuana to expand its availability for research and medicine.

=== Military veterans ===
Connolly was a cosponsor of the Helping Active Duty Deployed Act and the Veterans Health Care Budget Reform and Transparency Act.

=== Foreign issues ===
Connolly supported military intervention in Syria.

Connolly voted to provide Israel with support following October 7 attacks. In the wake of the attack, he voted against recognizing anti-Zionism as a form of antisemitism.

Connolly voted in favor of three military aid package supplementals for Ukraine, Israel, and Taiwan respectively in April 2024, along with most Democrats. After all three bills successfully passed the House, he criticized House Republicans for delaying voting.

== Political campaigns ==
=== 2008 ===
Connolly scored a 24-point victory over his closest opponent, former Congresswoman Leslie L. Byrne, in the 2008 Democratic primary. He then defeated Republican nominee Keith Fimian by more than ten points for the open seat held by Republican incumbent Tom Davis. The Independent Green Party candidate was Joseph P. Oddo.

=== 2010 ===
Connolly was challenged again by Fimian in 2010. Also running were Libertarian David L. Dotson, Independent Green David William Gillis, Jr., and Independent Christopher F. DeCarlo. Connolly won by fewer than a thousand votes.

=== 2012 ===
Connolly was challenged by Republican nominee Chris Perkins, Green nominee Joe Galdo and independent candidates Peter Marchetti, Chris DeCarlo and Mark Gibson. He received 61% of the vote. Connolly was significantly aided by redistricting. The old 11th had been reckoned a swing district, though Davis had held it without serious difficulty due to his popularity in the area. Redistricting made the 11th significantly more Democratic than its predecessor. Barack Obama carried the old 11th with 57% of the vote in 2008, but would have carried it with 61% of the vote under the new lines—making it one of the most Democratic white-majority districts in the South.

=== 2014 ===
Connolly faced Republican Suzanne Scholte, Green Joe Galdo, and Libertarian Marc Harrold in his reelection bid, winning with 56.86% of the vote.

=== 2016 ===
Connolly ran unopposed for reelection in 2016. He was reelected with 87.89% of the vote.

=== 2018 ===
Connolly faced Republican challenger, U.S. Army veteran Jeff Dove and Libertarian Stevan Porter in the 2018 election.

=== 2020 ===
Connolly faced a progressive primary challenger, Zainab Mohsini, ahead of the general election, his first primary challenger. Connolly won the Democratic primary against Mohsini. Connolly defeated Republican Manga Anantatmula in the 2020 election.

=== 2022 ===
Connolly faced Republican challenger, retired administrative law judge Jim Myles in the 2022 election. He was reelected with 66.7% of the vote.

=== 2024 ===
Connolly faced a primary challenger, attorney Ahsan Nasar, whom he defeated with 85.64% of the vote. In the general election, Connolly defeated Republican challenger Mike Van Meter with 66.68% of the vote.

== Electoral history ==
Gerry Connolly electoral history

=== Fairfax County Board of Supervisors ===
1995 Fairfax County Board of Supervisors special election
Party	Candidate	Votes	%
Democratic	Gerry Connolly	4,478	59.05%
Republican	Jeannemarie Devolites Davis	3,104	40.93%
Write-in		2	0.03%
Total votes		7,584	100.00%

1995 Fairfax County Board of Supervisors general election
Party	Candidate	Votes	%
Democratic	Gerry Connolly (incumbent)	10,578	55.82%
Republican	Jeannemarie Devolites Davis	8,371	44.18%
Total votes		18,949	100.00%

1999 Fairfax County Board of Supervisors general election
Party	Candidate	Votes	%
Democratic	Gerry Connolly (incumbent)	14,309	100.00%
Total votes		14,309	100.00%

2003 Fairfax County Board of Supervisors general election
Party	Candidate	Votes	%
Democratic	Gerry Connolly (incumbent)	98,419	53.14%
Republican	Mychele B. Brickner	81,319	43.91%
Independent	Jeremy G. Good	3,119	1.68%
Independent	C.W. "Levi" Levy	2,346	1.27%
Total votes		185,203	100.00%

2007 Fairfax County Board of Supervisors general election
Party	Candidate	Votes	%
Democratic	Gerry Connolly (incumbent)	113,830	59.47%
Republican	Gary H. Baise	68,403	35.74%
Independent	Glenda Gail Parker	8,990	4.70%
Write-in		185	0.10%
Total votes		191,408	100.00%

=== U.S. House of Representatives ===
2008 Virginia 11th congressional district election
Primary election
Party	Candidate	Votes	%
Democratic	Gerry Connolly	14,233	57.92%
Democratic	Leslie Byrne	8,196	33.35%
Democratic	Douglas J. Denneny	1,508	6.14%
Democratic	Lori P. Alexander	638	2.60%
Total votes		24,575	100.00%
General election
Democratic	Gerry Connolly	196,598	54.69%
Republican	Keith S. Fimian	154,758	43.05%
Independent	Joseph P. Oddo	7,271	2.02%
Write-in		864	0.24%
Total votes		359,491	100.00%

2010 Virginia 11th congressional district election
Party	Candidate	Votes	%
Democratic	Gerry Connolly (incumbent)	111,720	49.23%
Republican	Keith S. Fimian	110,739	48.79%
Independent	Christopher Francis DeCarlo	1,846	0.81%
Libertarian	David L. Dotson	1,382	0.61%
Independent	David William Gillis, Jr.	959	0.42%
Write-in		305	0.13%
Total votes		226,951	100.00%

2012 Virginia 11th congressional district election
Party	Candidate	Votes	%
Democratic	Gerry Connolly (incumbent)	202,606	60.89%
Republican	Christopher S. Perkins	117,902	35.43%
Independent	Mark Timothy Gibson	3,806	1.14%
Independent	Christopher Francis DeCarlo	3,027	0.91%
Green	Joseph Francis Galdo	2,195	0.66%
Independent Greens	Peter Matthew Marchetti	1,919	0.58%
Write-in		1,300	0.39%
Total votes		332,755	100.00%

2014 Virginia 11th congressional district election
Party	Candidate	Votes	%
Democratic	Gerry Connolly (incumbent)	106,780	56.93%
Republican	Suzanne Scholte	75,796	40.41%
Libertarian	Marc McCullough Harrold	3,264	1.74%
Green	Joseph Francis Galdo	1,739	0.93%
Write-in		226	0.12%
Total votes		187,579	100.00%

2016 Virginia 11th congressional district election
Party	Candidate	Votes	%
Democratic	Gerry Connolly (incumbent)	247,818	87.78%
Write-in		34,504	12.22%
Total votes		282,322	100.00%

2018 Virginia 11th congressional district election
Party	Candidate	Votes	%
Democratic	Gerry Connolly (incumbent)	219,191	71.10%
Republican	Jeffery Anthony Dove, Jr	83,023	26.93%
Libertarian	Stevan Michael Porter	5,546	1.80%
Write-in		513	0.17%
Total votes		308,273	100.00%

2020 Virginia 11th congressional district election
Primary election
Party	Candidate	Votes	%
Democratic	Gerry Connolly (incumbent)	50,626	77.60%
Democratic	Zainab Masooma Mohsini	14,610	22.39%
Write-in		5	0.01%
Total votes		65,241	100.00%
General election
Democratic	Gerry Connolly (incumbent)	280,725	71.39%
Republican	Manga Alamelu Anantatmula	111,380	28.32%
Write-in		1,136	0.29%
Total votes		393,241	100.00%

2022 Virginia 11th congressional district election
Party	Candidate	Votes	%
Democratic	Gerry Connolly (incumbent)	193,190	66.70%
Republican	James G. Myles	95,634	33.02%
Write-in		828	0.29%
Total votes		289,652	100.00%

2024 Virginia 11th congressional district election
Primary election
Party	Candidate	Votes	%
Democratic	Gerry Connolly (incumbent)	37,378	85.64%
Democratic	Ahsan M. Nasar	6,270	14.36%
Total votes		43,648	100.00%
General election
Democratic	Gerry Connolly (incumbent)	273,529	66.68%
Republican	Mike L. Van Meter	134,802	32.86%
Write-in		1,855	0.45%
Total votes		410,186	100.00%

=== Summary ===
Fairfax County Board of Supervisors: Results 1995—2007
Year	Subject	Party	Votes	%	Opponent	Party	Votes	%	Opponent	Party	Votes	%
1995-Special	Gerald Connolly	Democratic	4,478	59.0	Jeannemarie Devolites Davis	Republican	3,104	40.9	Others		2	0.0
1995	Gerald Connolly	Democratic	10,578	55.8	Jeannemarie Devolites Davis	Republican	8,371	44.2				
1999	Gerald Connolly	Democratic	14,309	100.0	Unopposed							
2003	Gerald Connolly	Democratic	98,419	53.1	Mychele B. Brickner	Republican	81,319	43.9	Others		5,465	3.0
2007	Gerald Connolly	Democratic	113,830	59.5	Gary H. Baise	Republican	68,403	35.7	Others		9,175	4.8

Virginia's 11th congressional district: Results 2008—2024
Year	Subject	Party	Votes	%	Opponent	Party	Votes	%	Opponent	Party	Votes	%
2008	Gerald Connolly	Democratic	196,598	54.7	Keith Fimian	Republican	154,758	43.0	Others		8,135	2.3
2010	Gerald Connolly	Democratic	111,720	49.2	Keith Fimian	Republican	110,739	48.8	Others		4,492	2.0
2012	Gerald Connolly	Democratic	202,606	60.9	Christopher Perkins	Republican	117,902	35.4	Others		12,247	3.7
2014	Gerald Connolly	Democratic	106,780	56.9	Suzanne Scholte	Republican	75,796	40.4	Others		5,229	2.8
2016	Gerald Connolly	Democratic	247,818	87.8	Unopposed				Others		34,504	12.2
2018	Gerald Connolly	Democratic	219,191	71.1	Jeff Dove	Republican	83,023	26.9	Others		6,052	2.0
2020	Gerald Connolly	Democratic	280,725	71.4	Manga Anantatmula	Republican	111,380	28.3	Others		1,136	0.3
2022	Gerald Connolly	Democratic	193,190	66.7	Jim Myles	Republican	95,634	33.0	Others		852	0.3
2024	Gerald Connolly	Democratic	273,529	66.7	Michael Van Meter	Republican	134,802	32.9	Others		1,855	0.5

== Personal life ==
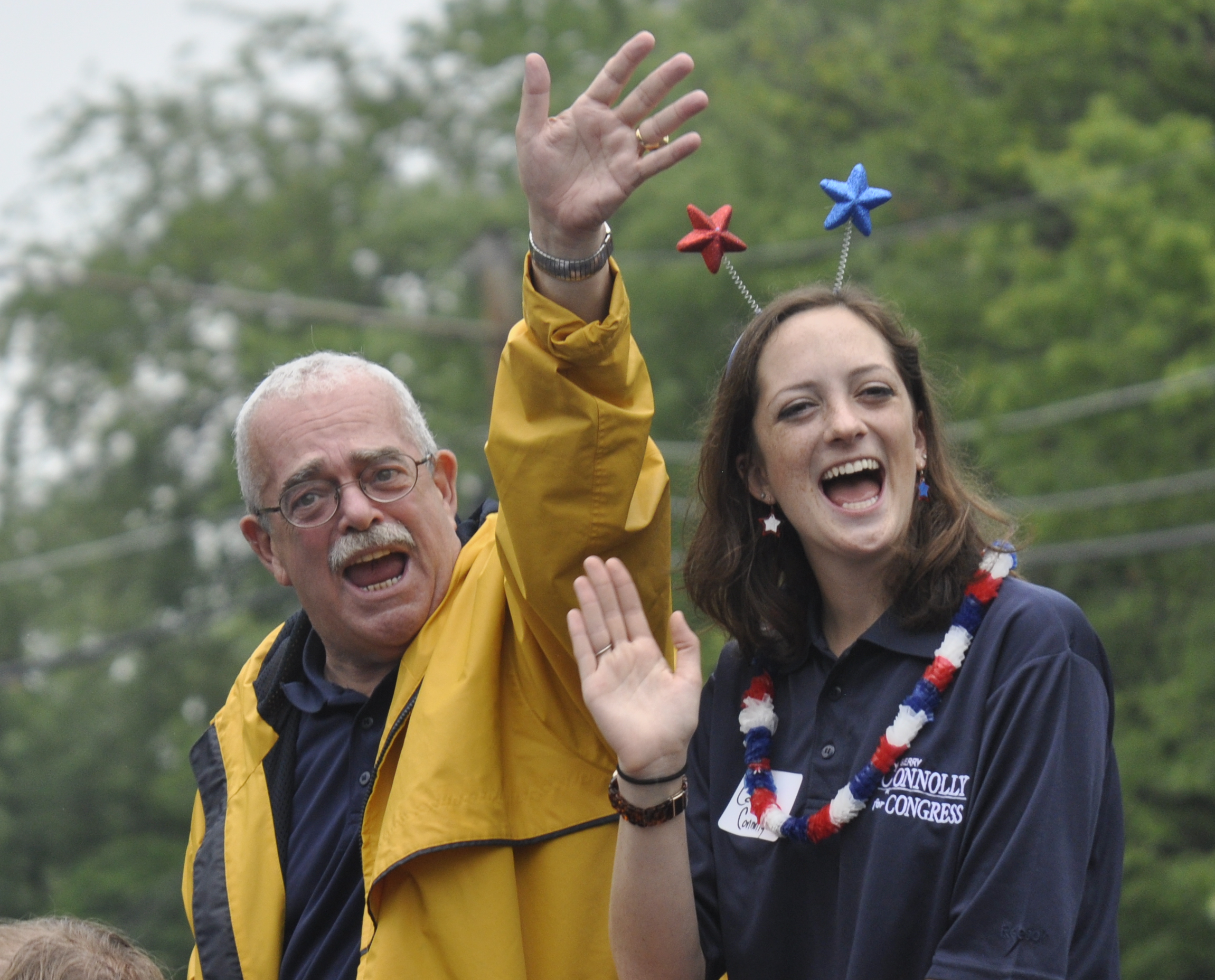
Connolly and his daughter Caitlin during 2015 Fairfax City July 4 parade

Connolly and his wife Cathy lived in Mantua.

Connolly was also a company member of The Providence Players of Fairfax, a community theatre in Fairfax County, having acted in several of their shows.

=== Legal issues ===
In 2004, Connolly was charged with "a misdemeanor count of hit and run" after causing an estimated $500 worth of property damage to a 2003 Ford Explorer and Connolly's 2003 Toyota Camry. Connolly claims he did not realize a collision took place when he swerved and then immediately stalled, forcing the Explorer to collide into Connolly's left front wheel. The Fairfax County Police Department was criticized for giving Connolly special treatment and potentially saving him from being forced to resign for a felony instead of a misdemeanor charge. Judge Craig Johnston later dismissed the misdemeanor charge against Connolly, saying Connolly's "position and his duties have caused him to be oblivious to what is going on in his car". David Freddoso criticized the judge's ruling in the Washington Examiner.

=== 2023 attack ===
On May 15, 2023, two of Connolly's staffers were injured when a man walked into his Fairfax, Virginia, office and attacked them with a baseball bat. The U.S. Capitol Police identified the man as 49-year-old Xuan Kha Tran Pham, of Fairfax. Connolly was not in the office at the time of the attack. Pham was also charged with a racial hate crime for an incident that had occurred several hours earlier when he smashed a car windshield after asking the occupant if she was white. Pham was acquitted of the bat attack by reason of insanity.

=== Illness and death ===
In November 2024, shortly after being reelected, Connolly disclosed that he had been diagnosed with esophageal cancer after experiencing slight stomach pain. He said he planned to undergo chemotherapy and immunotherapy. In April 2025, Connolly announced that despite the initial success of his treatments, his cancer had returned; he added that he would be retiring at the end of his term. He died at his home in Mantua, Virginia on May 21, 2025, at the age of 75.

== See also ==
- List of members of the United States Congress who died in office (2000–present)

U.S. House of Representatives
Preceded by Tom Davis	Member of the U.S. House of Representatives from Virginia's 11th congressional district 2009–2025	Succeeded by James Walkinshaw
Preceded by Jamie Raskin	Ranking Member of the House Oversight Committee; 2025	Succeeded by Stephen Lynch; Acting
Diplomatic posts
Preceded by Attila Mesterházy	President of the NATO Parliamentary Assembly; 2020–2022	Succeeded by Joëlle Garriaud-Maylam
Preceded by Michał Szczerba	President of the NATO Parliamentary Assembly; Acting; 2024	Succeeded by Marcos Perestrello
