= Kay Coles James =

American public official (born 1949)

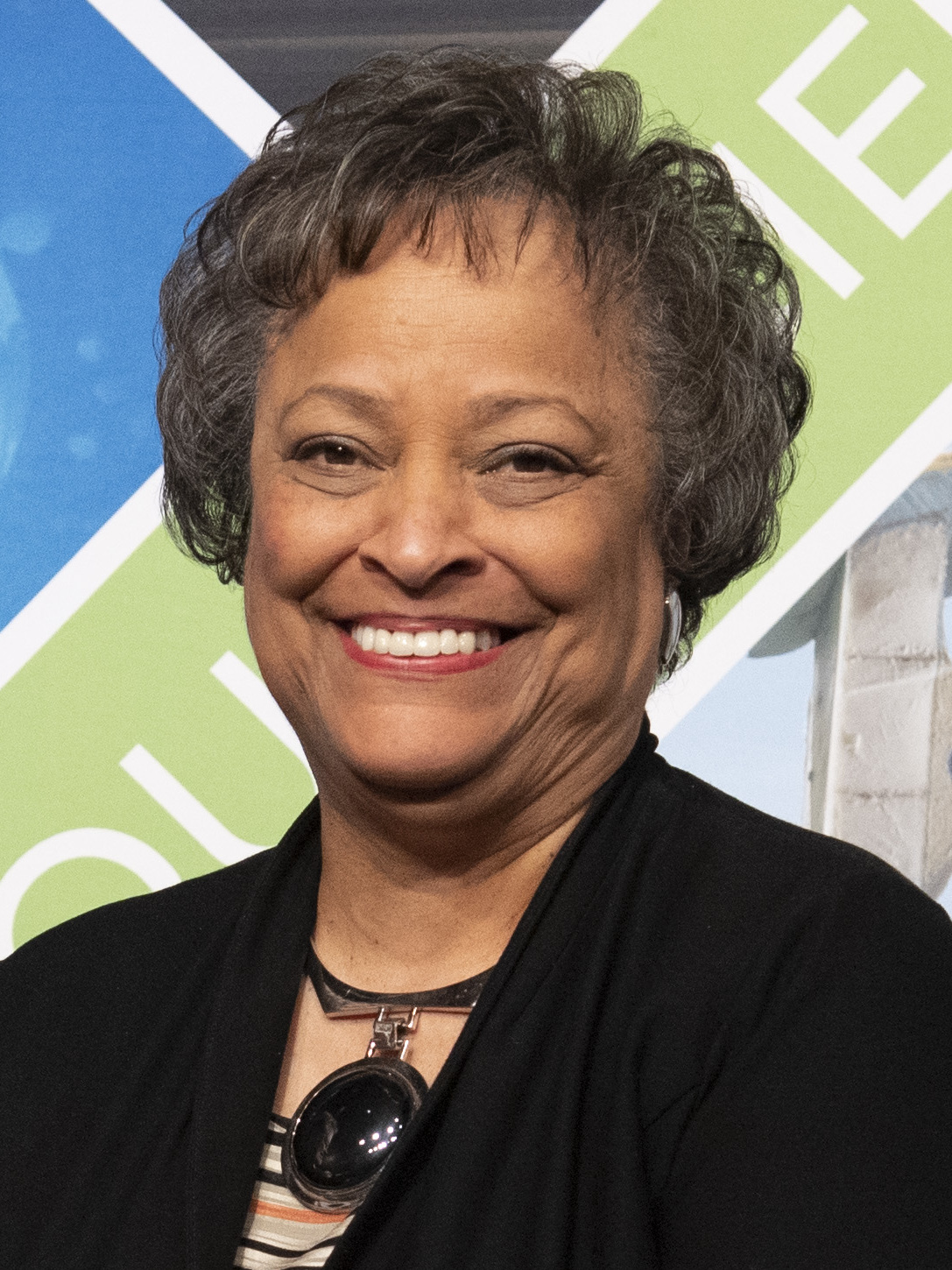

Secretary of the Commonwealth of Virginia
- In office January 15, 2022 – August 29, 2023; Acting: January 15, 2022 – March 2, 2022
- Governor: Glenn Youngkin
- Preceded by: Kelly Thomasson
- Succeeded by: Kelly Gee (acting)

President of The Heritage Foundation
- In office January 1, 2018 – December 1, 2021
- Preceded by: Edwin Feulner
- Succeeded by: Kevin Roberts

Director of the Office of Personnel Management
- In office July 11, 2001 – January 31, 2005
- President: George W. Bush
- Deputy: Dan Blair
- Preceded by: Janice Lachance
- Succeeded by: Linda M. Springer

6th Virginia Secretary of Health and Human Resources
- In office January 15, 1994 – March 12, 1996
- Governor: George Allen
- Preceded by: Howard Cullum
- Succeeded by: Robert Metcalf

Personal details
- Born: Madeline Kay Coles; June 1, 1949 (age 77) Portsmouth, Virginia, U.S.
- Party: Republican
- Spouse: Charles E. James Sr.
- Education: Hampton University (BS)

Kay Coles James (born June 1, 1949) is an American public official who served as secretary of the Commonwealth of Virginia from January 2022 to August 2023, and as the director for the United States Office of Personnel Management under President George W. Bush from 2001 to 2005. Previous to the OPM appointment, she served as Virginia secretary of health and human resources under then-Governor George Allen and was the dean of Regent University's government school. She is the president and founder of the Gloucester Institute, a leadership training center for young African Americans.

On December 19, 2017, she was named president of The Heritage Foundation, a conservative think tank. She is the first African-American and the first woman to hold that position. On March 22, 2021, she announced she was resigning from the foundation.

== Early life and education ==
Coles James grew up in Richmond, Virginia, the only girl among five boys. Her father did odd jobs as a guard, worked unloading ships when he was younger, and did maintenance work. Her father left home when she was around four years old. Coles James was then raised by her aunt and uncle, a schoolteacher and a businessman. Her mother had worked as a dental technician for her brother-in-law, and as a domestic, cleaning houses and caring for people, while trying to raise six children.

Coles James attended Chandler Junior High School and John Marshall High School in Richmond, in "largely all-white environments". She is a graduate of Hampton University, where she majored in history and secondary education.

== Career ==
Coles James served on School Board for Fairfax County, Virginia and the Virginia Board of Education, and on the board of the conservative evangelical Focus on the Family. She was senior vice president of the Family Research Council, a conservative, Christian right group and lobbying organization. She has also served as Executive Vice-President and Chief Operating Officer for One to One Partnership, a national umbrella organization for mentoring programs.

She was appointed by President Ronald Reagan and reappointed by President George H. W. Bush as member of the National Commission on Children, an advisory body on children issues. She served under President George H. W. Bush as Associate Director of the White House Office of National Drug Control Policy and as Assistant Secretary for public affairs at the U.S. Department of Health and Human Services.

In the mid-1990s, Coles James served as dean of the Robertson School of Government at Regent University in Virginia Beach, Virginia. She also served as Convention Secretary for the 1996 Republican National Convention, which nominated Bob Dole for president.

=== Office of Personnel Management ===
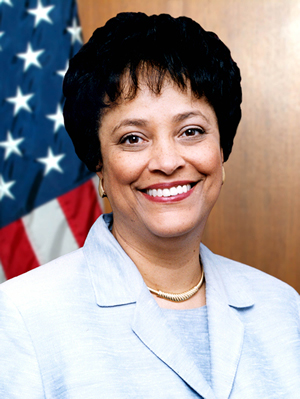
Coles James in 2001

James served as the director for the United States Office of Personnel Management from 2001 to 2005 in the George W. Bush administration. Paul Krugman noted that Regent University boasted of 150 graduates working in the Bush administration and criticized Coles James' tenure as the federal government's chief personnel officer when many of these hires occurred. Charlie Savage, a journalist with The Boston Globe, wrote that previous to Coles James, "veteran civil servants screened applicants and recommended whom to hire, usually picking top students from elite schools." Noting that Regent University is ranked a "tier four" school by U.S. News & World Report, the lowest score and essentially a tie for 136th place, Savage said Coles James' changes resulted in lawyers with more conservative credentials, less prior experience in civil rights law and the decline of the average ranking of the law school attended by the applicants. In addition to Savage, other journalists made similar comments.

On November 4, 2009, Governor-elect Bob McDonnell of Virginia named her one of the co-chairs of his transition committee and subsequently appointed her as a member of Virginia Commonwealth University's governing body, the Board of Visitors.

=== The Heritage Foundation ===
On December 19, 2017, The Heritage Foundation, an influential conservative Washington, D.C.–based public policy research institute, announced that Coles James would be its sixth president. She had served as a member of the Board of Trustees since 2005.

In 2018, she was nominated by President Donald Trump to serve as one of two members of the Women's Suffrage Centennial Commission.

In March 2019, she was appointed to the Advanced Technology External Advisory Council (ATEAC), which was set up by Google to advise on the ethical implications of Artificial Intelligence. Her appointment proved controversial, with some employees of Google protesting. On April 5, 2019, it was reported that Google had disbanded the ATEAC after more than 2,380 employees at Google signed a petition asking that Coles James be removed from it. The petition signers stated that "Coles James' positions on transgender and immigrant rights should have disqualified her from weighing in on AI ethics."

Coles James resigned from the Heritage Foundation in 2021.

=== Secretary of the Commonwealth of Virginia ===
Coles James later served as co-chair of Governor-elect Glenn Youngkin's transition steering committee and was appointed by Youngkin as secretary of the Commonwealth of Virginia in January 2022. She resigned in August 2023 to assume a leadership position for Youngkin's "Spirit of Virginia" PAC.

== Personal life ==
Coles James is the mother of three adult children. Her husband is Charles E. James Sr., who was the deputy assistant secretary of the Office of Federal Contract Compliance Programs from 2001 to 2009 during the George W. Bush administration.

== Honors and awards ==
In 2004, Coles James was elected as a fellow of the National Academy of Public Administration.

Coles James was named one of the Library of Virginia's Virginia Women in History in 2018.

Coles James is the recipient of several honorary degrees, including a Doctor of Laws Degree from Pepperdine University. Coles James is the recipient the University of Virginia's Publius Award for Public Service, and the Spirit of Democracy Award for Public Policy Leadership from the National Coalition on Black Civic Participation.

As a 1994 graduation speaker at Hampton University, Coles James said, "[The United States is] experiencing cultural AIDS. We as a country have been the victims of an immune system that has broken down. It's gone."

== Books ==
- James, Kay; Jacquelline Cobb, Fuller (1993). Never Forget. Zondervan. ISBN 978-0310482000.
- James, Kay; Jacquelline Cobb, Fuller (1995). Kay James. Today's Heroes. Zondervan. ISBN 0-310-49631-4.
- James, Kay; Kuo, David (1995). Transforming America: From the Inside Out. Zondervan. ISBN 0-310-48440-5.
- James, Kay (2001). What I Wish I'd Known Before I Got Married. Multnomah Publishers. ISBN 1-57673-781-0.

Political offices
Preceded by Kelly Thomasson	Secretary of the Commonwealth of Virginia; 2022–2023	Succeeded by Kelly Gee; Acting
