= Kelly Gee =

American public official

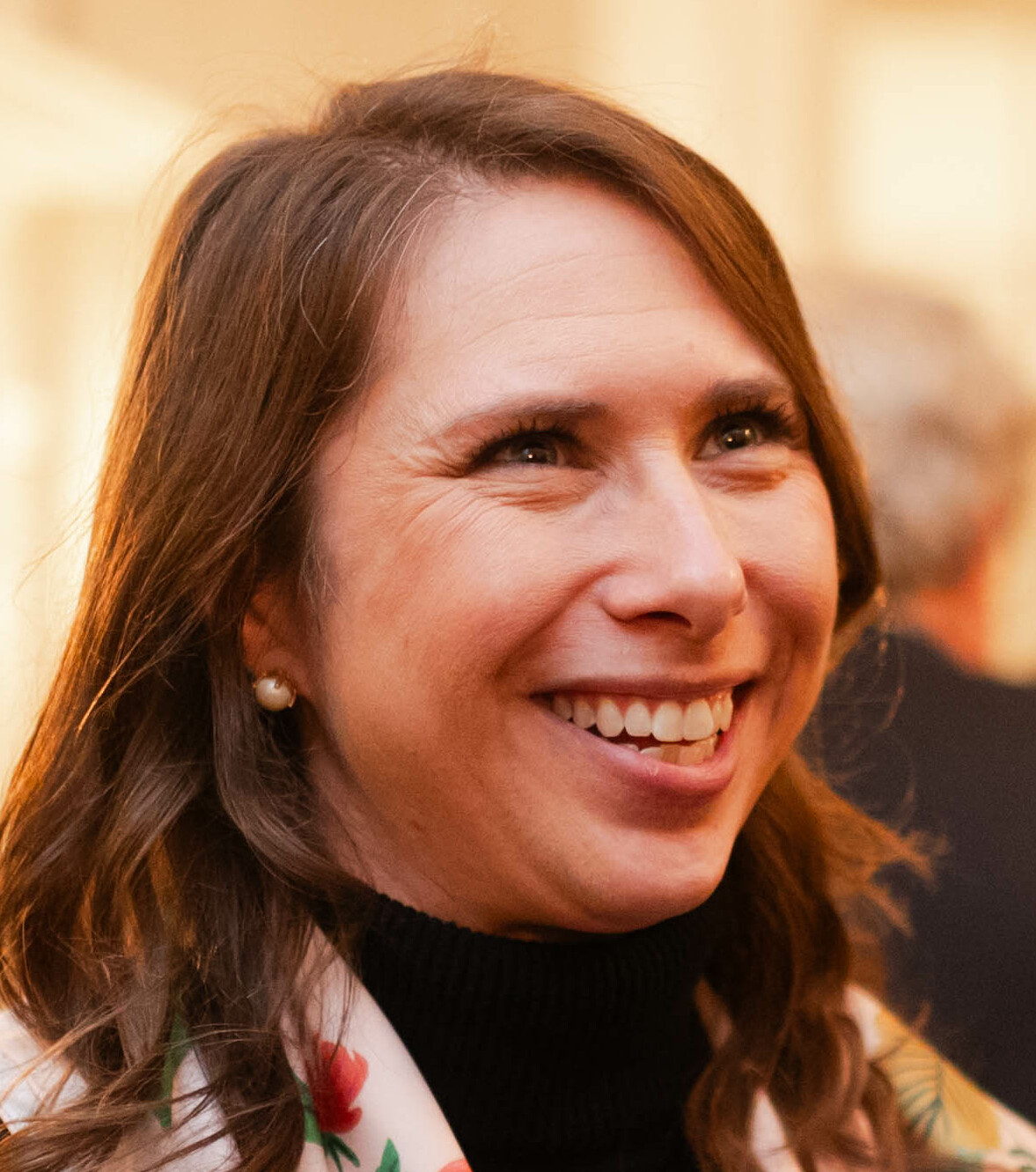
- Gee in 2024

Secretary of the Commonwealth of Virginia
- In office September 1, 2023 – January 17, 2026; Acting: September 1, 2023 – February 8, 2024
- Governor: Glenn Youngkin
- Preceded by: Kay Coles James
- Succeeded by: Candi King

Personal details
- Party: Republican
- Education: Richard Bland College (AS); College of William and Mary (BA); Virginia Tech (MA)

Kelly T. Gee is an American public official who served as secretary of the Commonwealth of Virginia from 2023- 2026. She was the executive director of the Virginia Lottery from 2022 to 2023. Gee served as the deputy chief of staff to Kirk Cox while he was speaker of the Virginia House of Delegates.

== Life ==
Gee earned an A.S. from the Richard Bland College in 2008. She completed a B.A. in government from the College of William & Mary in 2010. She earned a M.A. in political science from Virginia Tech.

Gee worked for eight years as a senior staff member to the Virginia General Assembly including as the deputy chief of staff to the 55th speaker of the House, Kirk Cox. In 2018, she joined the Virginia Lottery as the manager of government relations. In January 2022, she began serving as its acting executive director and was made permanent on June 6, 2022 following her appointment by governor Glenn Youngkin. In August 2023, she was nominated by Youngkin as the secretary of the Commonwealth of Virginia, succeeding Kay Coles James. Gee began acting in the role on September 1. She was confirmed by the Virginia legislature in February 2024.

Political offices
Preceded by Kay Coles James	Secretary of the Commonwealth of Virginia; Acting: 2023–2024; 2023–2026	Succeeded by Candi King
