= Patricia A. Shiu =

American lawyer

Patricia Ann Shiu
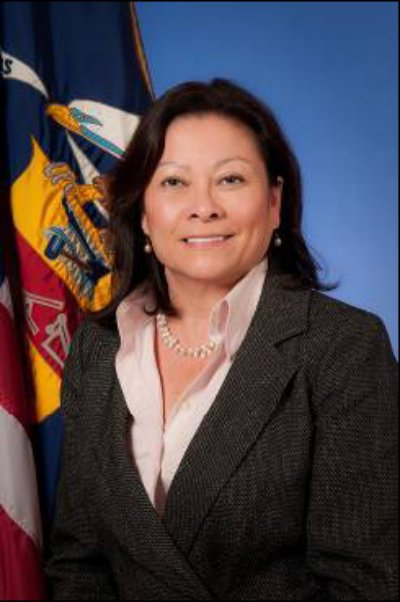
- Shiu in 2010

Director of Federal Contract Compliance
- In office October 1, 2009 – December 1, 2016
- Preceded by: Charles James
- Succeeded by: Craig Leen

Personal details
- Born: 1958 (age 67–68) Chicago, IL
- Party: Democrat
- Spouse: Michael Kamler
- Children: Alexandra and Aviva Kamler
- Occupation: Attorney

Patricia Ann Shiu (born 1958) is the former Director of Federal Contract Compliance from 2009 to December 1, 2016, during the administration of Barack Obama. Prior to joining the Department of Labor, Shiu worked as vice president for Programs at the Legal Aid Society-Employment Law Center in San Francisco. She worked there for 26 years. Shiu also worked as an associate at the law firm of Pillsbury, Madison & Sutro.

In 1982, Shiu received her J.D. from the University of San Francisco School of Law and in 1979, her B.A. in Political Economy of Industrialized States from the University of California, Berkeley. Born in Chicago, she is half Chinese and half Irish, and is the daughter of Joan Pierce Shiu and Mr. Shiu.

== Background ==
As an attorney, Shiu specialized in employment discrimination and family and medical leave cases. While at the Legal Aid Society, Shiu served as the director of the Society's Work and Family Project. In 1993, Shiu was appointed to the Department of Education’s Civil Rights Reviewing Authority.

== Awards and honors ==
Shiu has been the Treasurer for the Board of the National Employment Lawyers Association; a past president of the California Women Lawyers; a board member for California Rural Legal Assistance, NAPABA, and Asian American Bar Association (AABA). She currently serves as a member of the Grant Advisory Committee of the Impact Fund, which makes grants to support impact litigation for marginalized communities.

She has received numerous honors for her work including the California Women’s Law Center’s 2002 Abby J. Leibman Pursuit of Justice Award and the Pacific Asian American Women Bay Area Coalition’s 2002 Woman Warrior Award. In 2009 she was recognized by the Asian American Law Society with its "Joe Morozumi Lifetime Achievement Award" for her "spirit of uncomprising legal advocacy in matters of conscience."

== See also ==
- List of OFCCP DAS
