= Thomas Y. Allen =

American politician

Member of the Virginia House of Delegates from Mecklenburg County
- In office December 6, 1893 – December 4, 1895
- Preceded by: J. Thomas Goode
- Succeeded by: Edward L. Baptist

Personal details
- Born: Thomas Young Allen; 1852 Granville, North Carolina, United States
- Died: April 7, 1933 (aged 80) Chase City, Virginia, United States
- Party: Populist
- Spouses: Ida Mitchell (m. 1885; died 1894); Emma Cheek (m. 1896)

Thomas Young Allen (1852 – April 7, 1933) was an American politician who served in the Virginia House of Delegates.
