= Janet Vestal Kelly =

American politician

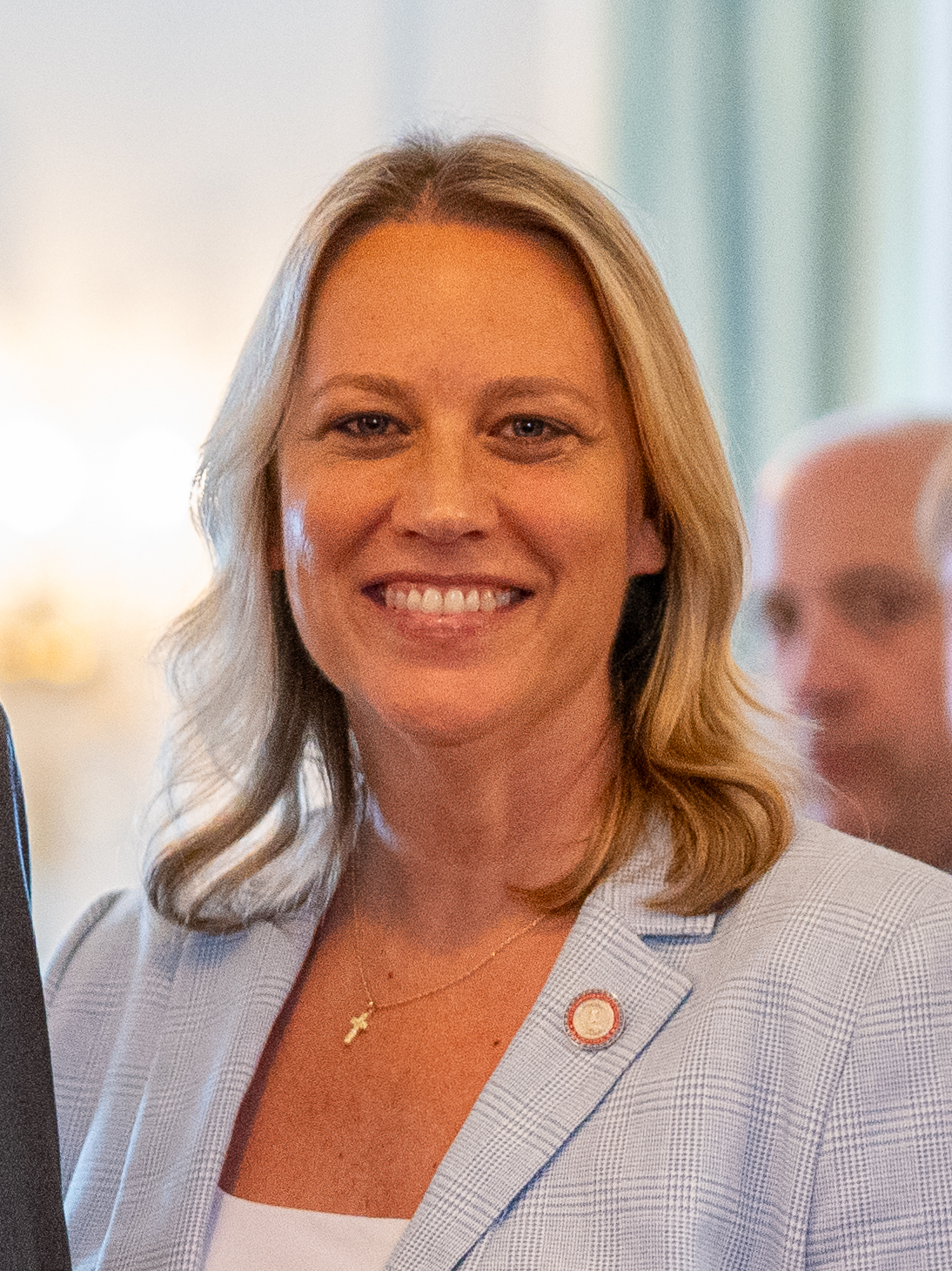
- Vestal Kelly in 2025

16th Virginia Secretary of Health and Human Resources
- In office July 8, 2024 – January 17, 2026
- Governor: Glenn Youngkin
- Preceded by: John Littel
- Succeeded by: Marvin Figueroa

Secretary of the Commonwealth of Virginia
- In office January 24, 2010 – January 17, 2014
- Governor: Bob McDonnell
- Preceded by: Katherine Hanley
- Succeeded by: Levar Stoney

Personal details
- Born: Janet Elizabeth Vestal; February 16, 1976 (age 50) Alamance County, North Carolina, U.S.
- Party: Republican
- Spouses: Robert Keith Polarek (m. 1997, divorced); Ryan Patrick Kelly (m. 2012)
- Children: 3
- Education: Liberty University (BA)

Janet Vestal Kelly (born February 16, 1976) is an American civil servant who served as the Virginia Secretary of Health and Human Resources from 2024 to 2026. She previously served as the Secretary of the Commonwealth of Virginia from 2010 through 2014 as part of the cabinet of Governor Bob McDonnell.

== Career ==
She previously served as Chief Operations Officer of McDonnell's gubernatorial campaign and on his staff in the Attorney General's office. During McDonnell's federal corruption trial, Kelly served as a key witness for the defense.

Kelly currently serves as Principal & Director of Government Relations for America's Kids Belong, as well as President of Virginia's Kids Belong, organizations devoted to uniting government, faith-based, creative, and business sectors to end the foster care & adoption crisis in the US.

== Personal life ==
Kelly married Robert Keith Polarek on August 9, 1997. The two later divorced, and Kelly married Ryan Patrick Kelly in 2012.

Political offices
Preceded by Katherine Hanley	Secretary of the Commonwealth of Virginia; 2010–2014	Succeeded by Levar Stoney
