= J. Thomas Goode =

American politician

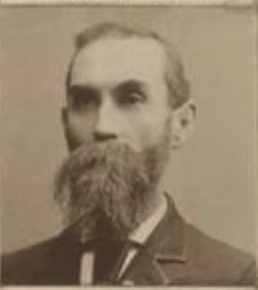
- Official portrait, 1892

Member of the Virginia House of Delegates from Mecklenburg County
- In office December 2, 1891 – December 6, 1893
- Preceded by: James N. Hutcheson
- Succeeded by: Thomas Y. Allen

Personal details
- Born: John Thomas Goode; July 21, 1835 Boydton, Virginia, U.S.
- Died: April 3, 1916 (aged 80) Chase City, Virginia, U.S.
- Party: Democratic

Military service
- Allegiance: Confederate States
- Branch/service: Confederate States Army
- Years of service: 1861–1865
- Rank: Colonel
- Battles/wars: American Civil War

John Thomas Goode (July 21, 1835 – April 3, 1916) was an American politician who served in the Virginia House of Delegates.
