= James N. Hutcheson =

American politician

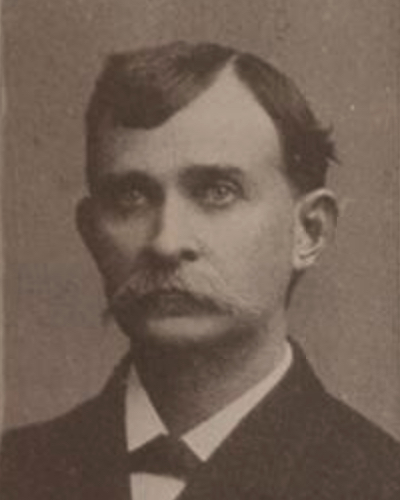
- Official portrait, 1902

Member of the Virginia Senate from the 25th district
- In office December 4, 1901 – January 10, 1906
- Preceded by: David Q. Eggleston
- Succeeded by: F. B. Roberts

Member of the Virginia House of Delegates from Mecklenburg County
- In office December 4, 1889 – December 2, 1891
- Preceded by: Britton Baskerville Jr.
- Succeeded by: J. Thomas Goode

Personal details
- Born: James Nathaniel Hutcheson; February 9, 1857 Mecklenburg, Virginia, U.S.
- Died: January 14, 1909 (aged 51) Mecklenburg, Virginia, U.S.
- Party: Democratic
- Spouse: Evelyn Hutcheson

James Nathaniel Hutcheson (February 9, 1857 – January 14, 1909) was an American politician who served in the Virginia House of Delegates and Virginia Senate.
