= Candi King =

Virginia House of Delegates member

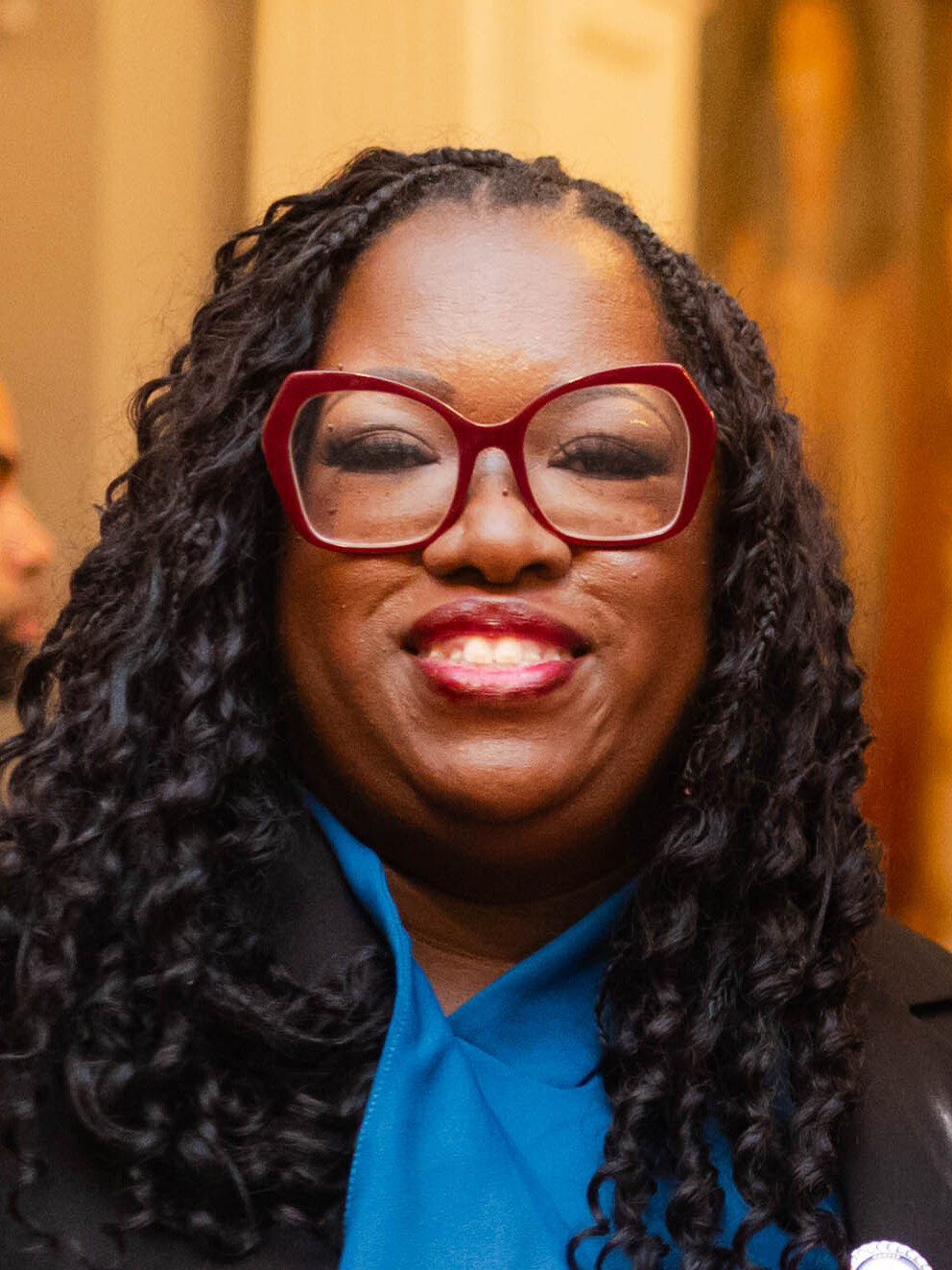
- King in 2024

Secretary of the Commonwealth of Virginia
- Incumbent
- Assumed office January 17, 2026; Acting: January 17, 2026 – February 13, 2026
- Governor: Abigail Spanberger
- Preceded by: Kelly Gee

Member of the Virginia House of Delegates
- In office January 11, 2021 – January 17, 2026
- Preceded by: Jennifer Carroll Foy
- Succeeded by: Margaret Franklin
- Constituency: 2nd district (2021–2024); 23rd district (2024–2026)

Personal details
- Born: Candi Patrice Mundon; 1981 or 1982 (age 43–44) Portsmouth, Virginia, U.S.
- Party: Democratic
- Spouse: Josh King
- Children: 3
- Education: Norfolk State University (BA)

Candi Patrice Mundon King (born 1981/1982) is an American politician who served as a Democratic member of the Virginia House of Delegates from the 23rd district. In December 2025, Governor-elect Abigail Spanberger announced Mundon King as her nominee to be secretary of the Commonwealth of Virginia. Mundon assumed office at the start of Governor Spanberger’s term.

== Biography ==
King obtained a bachelor's degree in political science from Norfolk State University. She has worked as a nonprofit program manager and an education advocate.

== Political career ==
=== 2021 ===
King announced her campaign for delegate in December 2020, shortly after her predecessor Jennifer Carroll Foy resigned to run for governor, causing a special election. After winning the Democratic primary, King faced Republican Heather Mitchell in the general election on January 5, 2021. King won with 51.5% of the vote, with a margin of 263 votes.

King's re-election involved a primary challenge from Prince William County resident Pamela Montgomery. The race became one of the most expensive primaries in the state because of money contributed by clean energy group Clean Virginia and utility provider Dominion Energy. Despite the flood of outside money, King won with 67.77%-32.23%.

In the November general election, King won a full term against Republican Gina Ciarcia, a history teacher at a private Christian school.

== Election results ==
2021 Virginia House of Delegates 2nd district special election
Party	Candidate	Votes	%
Democratic	Candi King	4,451	51.7%
Republican	Heather F. Mitchell	4,143	48.2%
Total votes		8,603	100.00%

2021 Virginia House of Delegates 2nd district Democratic primary election
Party	Candidate	Votes	%
Democratic	Candi King	3,553	67.8%
Democratic	Pamela Montgomery	1,690	32.2%
Total votes		5,243	100.00%

2021 Virginia House of Delegates 2nd district general election
Party	Candidate	Votes	%
Democratic	Candi King	15,310	57.2%
Republican	Gina R. Ciarcia	11,393	42.6%
Total votes		26,763	100.00%

Political offices
Preceded by Kelly Gee	Secretary of the Commonwealth of Virginia; 2026–present	Incumbent
