= Anne Petera =

American politician

U.S. Assistant Secretary of Homeland Security for Intergovernmental Programs
- In office April 17, 2007 – January 20, 2009
- President: George W. Bush
- Preceded by: Chester Lunner (acting)
- Succeeded by: Juliette Kayyem

Secretary of the Commonwealth of Virginia
- In office January 1998 – January 21, 2002
- Governor: Jim Gilmore
- Preceded by: Betsy Davis Beamer
- Succeeded by: Anita Rimler

Personal details
- Born: September 1, 1952 (age 74)
- Party: Republican
- Education: Virginia Commonwealth University

Anne P. Petera (born September 1, 1952) is an American politician from Virginia and North Carolina and a former United States Department of Homeland Security official.

Petera served as Assistant Secretary for Intergovernmental Programs in the National Protection and Programs Directorate of the Department of Homeland Security from April, 2007 to January, 2009, after serving as Senior Advisor to the Under Secretary for Management at the Department since 2006. Prior to her appointment to DHS, she served as Director of Administration in the Office of Virginia Attorney General Jerry Kilgore from 2002 to 2006. From 1998 to 2002, she served as Secretary of the Commonwealth of Virginia in the Cabinet of Governor Jim Gilmore. She was appointed as Chair of the Virginia Alcoholic Beverage Control Board by Governor George Allen, serving in that post from 1996 to 1998.

In addition to her state and federal government service, Petera is also an active member of the Republican Party, serving as Chair of the First Congressional District Committee from 1994 to 1998, Treasurer of the Republican Party of Virginia from 1998 to 2001, and as the Committee Woman from Virginia, a member of the Republican National Committee. Her educational background includes a B.S. in business administration from Virginia Commonwealth University.

In July 2019, Petera announced her candidacy for mayor of Kill Devil Hills, North Carolina, where she moved in 2015. She lost to Ben Sproul in the November 2019 general election.

Political offices
Preceded by Betsy Davis Beamer	Secretary of the Commonwealth of Virginia; 1998–2002	Succeeded by Anita Rimler
