= B. O. James =

American politician

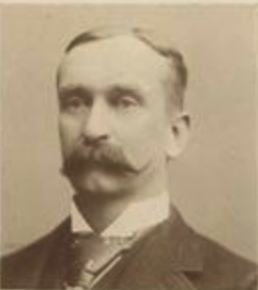

Secretary of the Commonwealth of Virginia
- In office October 22, 1909 – April 26, 1927
- Governor: Claude A. Swanson; William Hodges Mann; Henry C. Stuart; Westmoreland Davis; E. Lee Trinkle; Harry F. Byrd
- Preceded by: David Q. Eggleston
- Succeeded by: Martin A. Hutchinson

Member of the Virginia House of Delegates from Goochland County
- In office December 2, 1891 – December 6, 1893
- Preceded by: John H. Vanmater
- Succeeded by: William B. W. Brooking

Personal details
- Born: Benjamin Oliver James; June 4, 1852 Goochland, Virginia, U.S.
- Died: April 26, 1927 (aged 74) Richmond, Virginia, U.S.
- Party: Democratic
- Spouse: Mary Evelyn Kean
- Education: Hampden–Sydney College; Washington and Lee University

Benjamin Oliver James (June 4, 1852 – April 26, 1927) was an American Democratic politician who served as a member of the Virginia House of Delegates and as Secretary of the Commonwealth of Virginia under 6 governors.
