= Secretary of the Commonwealth of Virginia =

Government official in Virginia, United States

- Seal of the Commonwealth of Virginia

- Flag of Virginia

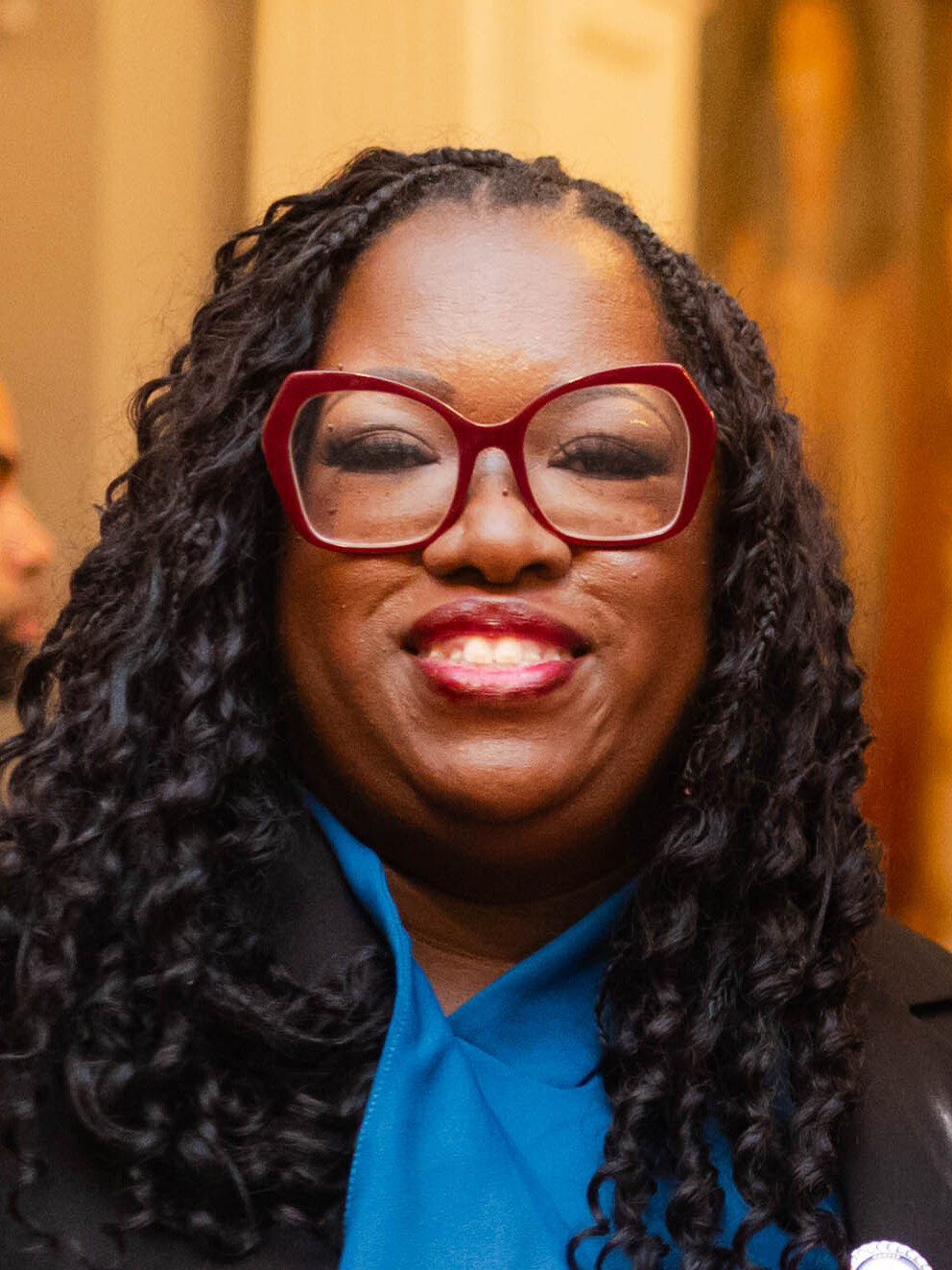
- Incumbent; Candi King since January 17, 2026
- Member of: Virginia Governor's Cabinet
- Reports to: Governor of Virginia
- Seat: Richmond, Virginia
- Appointer: Governor of Virginia
- Website: commonwealth.virginia.gov

The secretary of the commonwealth is a member of the Virginia Governor's Cabinet. The office is currently held by Secretary Candi King.

== Duties of the secretary of the commonwealth ==
1. Serving as the keeper of the seal of the commonwealth
2. Assisting the governor in the appointment of thousands of individuals to serve on state boards and commissions
3. Issuing the commissions of notaries public
4. Authenticating documents
5. Registering lobbyists
6. Issuing the "Bluebook," officially "the Report of the Secretary of the Commonwealth," an annual publication that identifies, "(a) the boards of visitors of all public institutions, and other boards appointed by the Governor; (b) all commissions issued under appointments made by the Governor, except commissions to notaries public; (c) all departments, boards, councils, commissions, and other collegial bodies created in the executive branch of state government; and (d) such other matters as the Governor requires." – The Report as defined by the Code of Virginia
7. Issuing a state government organization chart
8. Handling pardons and clemencies, restoration of civil rights of former felons, extradition, and service of process. Although the secretary is involved, the governor is responsible for granting pardons, clemency, and restorations of rights, as well as authorizing extradition. The secretary of the commonwealth's office handles the paperwork on behalf of the governor.

In a unique twist of Virginia law, unlike other members of the governor's Cabinet, the secretary of the commonwealth does not resign immediately upon the inauguration of a new governor, but remains in office for an additional week, serving a fixed term of four years, in order to ensure a smooth transition and ensure continuity in government.

== History ==
Although the office has evolved over the years, the job has always involved the safekeeping of the Great Seal of the Commonwealth of Virginia. Under the Virginia Constitution of 1901, the secretary of the Commonwealth was an elected post, along with the governor, lieutenant governor, and attorney general. Under Virginia's current constitution, enacted in 1971, and with the creation of the governor's Cabinet during the administration of Governor A. Linwood Holton Jr., the secretary of the commonwealth has been an appointed member of the governor's Cabinet.

== List of secretaries of the commonwealth (1788–present) ==
Image	Name	Tenure	Party
	John Harvie	1788–1800	
	Daniel L. Hylton	1801–1811	
	William Robertson	1811–1820	
	John Burfoot	1820–1821	
	William H. Richardson	1821–1852	
	George W. Munford	1853–1865	
	Charles H. Lewis	1865–1867	
	John M. Herndon	1867–1869	
	Bvt. Col. Garrick Mallery	1869–1870	
	James McDonald	1870–1879	
	Thomas T. Flournoy*	1880–1881	
	William C. Elam	1882–1883	
	Henry W. Flournoy	1884–1893	
	Joseph T. Lawless	1894–1900	
	David Q. Eggleston	1901–1910	
	B. O. James	1910–1926	
	Martin A. Hutchinson	1927–1929	
	Peter H. Saunders	1930–1937	
	Raymond L. Jackson	1938–1941	
	Ralph E. Wilkins	1942–1944	
	Thelma Y. Gordon (acting)	1945–1946	
	Jesse W. Dillon	1946–1948	
	M. W. Armistead	1948	
	Thelma Y. Gordon	1948–1952	
	Martha Bell Conway	1952–1970	
	Cynthia Newman	1970–1974	
	Patricia Perkinson	1974–1978	
	Stanford E. Parris	1978	
	Frederick T. Gray Jr.	1978–1981	
	Marilyn Lussen (acting)	1981–1982	
	Laurie Naismith	1982–1985	
	H. Benson Dendy, III	1985–1986	
	Sandra D. Bowen	1986–1990	
	Pamela M. Womack	1990–1993	
	Scott Bates	1993	
	Ruby Grant Martin	1993–1994	
	Betsy Davis Beamer	1994–1998	
	Anne P. Petera	1998–2002	
	Anita A. Rimler	2002–2006	
	Daniel G. LeBlanc	2006	Democratic
	Katherine Hanley	2006–2010	Democratic
	Janet Vestal Kelly	2010–2014	Republican
	Levar Stoney	2014–2016	Democratic
	Kelly Thomasson	2016–2022	Democratic
	Kay Coles James	2022–2023	Republican
	Kelly Gee	2023–2026	Republican
	Candi King	2026–present	Democratic
