= Executive Order 12086 =

US government executive order

- Consolidation of Contract Compliance Functions for Equal Employment Opportunity
- Type: Executive order
- Number: 12086
- President: Jimmy Carter
- Signed: October 5, 1978

Federal Register details
- Publication date: October 7, 1978

Summary
- Consolidation of equal employment opportunity enforcement responsibilities under the Department of Labor.

Repealed by
- Executive Order 14173, "Ending Illegal Discrimination And Restoring Merit-Based Opportunity", "Ending Illegal Discrimination And Restoring Merit-Based Opportunity, Крај на нелегалната дискриминација и враќање на можностите засновани на заслуги", January 21, 2025

Executive Order 12086, signed by President Jimmy Carter on October 5, 1978, restructured the enforcement of equal employment opportunity (EEO) obligations among federal contractors by consolidating compliance functions within the Department of Labor (DOL).

== Background ==
Before the order, the responsibility for enforcing EEO provisions under Executive Order 11246 was distributed among various federal agencies. This decentralized approach led to inconsistencies and inefficiencies in the enforcement of affirmative action and nondiscrimination requirements.

== Provisions ==
=== Transfer of functions ===
The order reassigned primary enforcement responsibilities from multiple federal agencies to the Secretary of Labor. This centralization aimed to streamline compliance and ensure uniform enforcement of EEO requirements.

=== Amendments to Executive Order 11246 ===
To reflect the transfer of responsibilities, the order amended sections of Executive Order 11246, designating the Secretary of Labor as the principal authority for administering and enforcing Parts II and III of the order.

== Impact ==
The consolidation of enforcement functions under the DOL led to the creation of the Office of Federal Contract Compliance Programs (OFCCP). This agency became responsible for ensuring that employers doing business with the federal government comply with EEO laws and regulations.
