= Janice Lachance =

American politician

Member of the Federal Salary Council
- Designate
- Assumed office TBA
- President: Joe Biden

Director of the United States Office of Personnel Management
- In office 1997–2001
- President: Bill Clinton
- Preceded by: James B. King
- Succeeded by: Kay Coles James

Personal details
- Born: Janice Rachel Lachance; June 17, 1953 (age 72) Biddeford, Maine, U.S.
- Education: Manhattanville College (BA); Tulane University (JD)

Janice Rachel Lachance (born June 17, 1953) is an American attorney and government official working as the president of the American Society for Public Administration. She was previously the 13th chief executive of the Special Libraries Association and director of the United States Office of Personnel Management.

== Early life and education ==
Lachance was born and raised in Biddeford, Maine The first in her extended family to go on to college, Lachance graduated from Manhattanville College in Purchase, New York, and earned her Juris Doctor from the Tulane University School of Law in New Orleans, Louisiana (1978). She is admitted to practice law in the State of Maine and the District of Columbia as well as the United States Supreme Court.

== Career ==
From 1997 to 2001, Lachance was the director and CEO of the United States Office of Personnel Management (OPM), the United States' federal government's independent human resources agency. Appointed to the position by President Bill Clinton and unanimously confirmed by the United States Senate, Lachance provided policy and program leadership for 1.8 million federal employees. During her tenure, Clinton advanced the post of OPM Director to Cabinet status.

Prior to becoming director of OPM, Lachance was the agency's deputy director (1997), chief of staff (1996–97), and director of communications and policy (1993–96). Previously, she served as director of communications and political affairs and policy advisor for the American Federation of Government Employees, (AFGE) (1987–93). After leaving OPM in 2001, Lachance transitioned to a management consulting practice specializing in strategic planning, communications, human resources management, and organizational transformation for membership and non-profit organizations.

Lachance has led ministerial-level delegations to the People's Republic of China, Hong Kong, Taiwan, Australia, New Zealand, Israel, and the OECD in Paris, France.

She stepped down from her post at the Special Libraries Association at the end of December 2014 and is currently the interim director of the Better Business Bureau Institute for Marketplace Trust. She is a fellow in the National Academy of Public Administration and has served on their board of directors.

In March 2022, President Joe Biden appointed Lachance to serve as a member of the Federal Salary Council, an independent advisory body that provides recommendations on government compensation.
