= Kelly Thomasson =

American politician

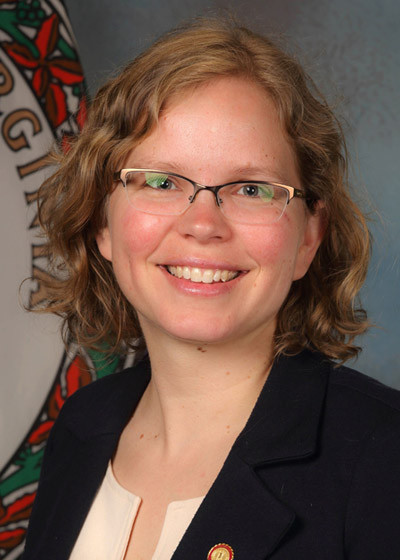

Secretary of the Commonwealth of Virginia
- In office April 15, 2016 – January 15, 2022
- Governor: Terry McAuliffe; Ralph Northam
- Preceded by: Levar Stoney
- Succeeded by: Kay Coles James

Personal details
- Born: Kelly Teal Thomasson; July 7, 1979 (age 46) Henrico County, Virginia, U.S.
- Political party: Democratic
- Spouse: Clark Mercer
- Education: Virginia Commonwealth University (BA)

Kelly Teal Thomasson Mercer (born July 7, 1979) is an American Democratic politician, who served as the Secretary of the Commonwealth of Virginia from April 2016 to January 2022. Initially appointed by Governor Terry McAuliffe, she continued as Secretary under the administration of Governor Ralph Northam. Prior to her appointment as Secretary, Thomasson served as Deputy Secretary of the Commonwealth under Governor McAuliffe.

== Background ==
Thomasson's family hails from Montpelier in Hanover County, Virginia. She joined Mark Warner's 2001 gubernatorial campaign, upon graduating from Virginia Commonwealth University. Although initially, she intended to pursue a master's degree in education, she instead accepted a job in Warner's administration after the election. Thomasson continued to work for Warner after he left the governor's office, spending a total of fourteen years in his employ. Among other positions, Thomasson served as Director of Scheduling during Warner's time as governor and as Projects Director after Warner was elected to the U.S. Senate.

== Career ==
=== McAuliffe administration ===
In 2014, Thomasson was appointed Deputy Secretary of the Commonwealth of Virginia by Governor Terry McAuliffe. She served under Levar Stoney until April 2016, when Stoney resigned to run for Mayor of Richmond. Thomasson was then appointed by McAuliffe as Stoney's successor.

One week later, McAuliffe issued an executive order intended to grant a blanket restoration of civil rights to all released felons in the state (who were not on probation or parole). This would have impacted over 200,000 individuals. As Secretary of the Commonwealth, Thomasson's responsibilities include overseeing the restoration of rights to eligible Virginia residents. Although McAuliffe's executive order was struck down by the Virginia Supreme Court in July of that year, McAuliffe and Thomasson proceeded to restore rights to eligible felons on a case-by-case basis. By the end of McAuliffe's term, over 169,000 individuals had their rights restored under this revised policy.

The Richmond Times-Dispatch has called this restoration of rights "perhaps the most significant policy action" of McAuliffe's administration, and Style Weekly named Thomasson to its 2017 Top 40 Under 40 list, highlighting her work in the matter as a "singular achievement". The policy has also bred controversy. The Virginia Circuit Court judge of Lee, Scott, and Wise counties has argued that the policy may still be unconstitutional, even in its revised form, since it is unlikely that McAuliffe individually reviewed the specific details of each felon's case. In late October 2017, the commonwealth's attorney of Wise County sought to subpoena McAuliffe, then-lieutenant governor Ralph Northam, and Thomasson, in order to resolve the matter. Because this occurred in the weeks leading up to Virginia's 2017 gubernatorial election, some dismissed the attorney's actions as a political stunt.

Thomasson also helped McAuliffe form the Governor's Millennial Civic Engagement Task Force in the Summer of 2017, which focused on promoting civic engagement among Virginia's college students.

=== Northam administration ===
Thomasson has continued to serve as Secretary of the Commonwealth under Governor Ralph Northam.

== Personal life ==
Thomasson is married to Clark Mercer, with whom she has two children. Mercer serves as the chief of staff to Governor Ralph Northam and had previously served in the same post during Northam's term as Lieutenant Governor of Virginia.

Thomasson and her family live in Ashland, Virginia, where she serves on the board of the Ashland Main Street Association. She has also done publicity work for the Ashland Theater, a historic art deco theater built in the 1940s.

Political offices
Preceded by Levar Stoney	Secretary of Virginia; 2016–2022	Succeeded by Kay Coles James
