= List of OFCCP DAS =

Directors and Deputy Assistant Secretary of Labor for OFCCP

Old OFCCP Seal

The Director and Deputy Assistant Secretary of Labor for OFCCP is the head of the Office of Federal Contract Compliance Programs.

== List of Directors and Deputy Assistant Secretaries of Labor for OFCCP ==
This is a complete list of all past and present Directors and Deputy Assistant Secretaries of Labor for OFCCP.^{[a]}

Deputy Assistant Secretary	Photo	Start of Term	End of Term	President(s)
Edward C Sylvester Jr.^{[a]}		1965	1968	Lyndon Johnson
John L. Wilks^{[a]}		1969	1972	Richard Nixon
George Holland^{[a]}		1972	1972	Richard Nixon
Phillip J. Davis^{[a]}		1972	1974	Richard Nixon
Lawrence Z. Lorber^{[a]}		1974	1977	Gerald Ford
Weldon J. Rougeau^{[a]}		1977	1981	Jimmy Carter
Ellen Shong Bergman^{[a]}^{[b]}		1981	1984	Ronald Reagan
Jerry Blakemore^{[a]}^{[b]}		1984	1987	Ronald Reagan
Fred W. Alvarez	Fred W. Alvarez	1987	1989	Ronald Reagan
Cari M. Dominguez^{[a]}^{[b]}	Cari M. Dominguez	1989	1991	George H. W. Bush
Jaime Ramon^{[a]}		1992	1993	George H. W. Bush
Shirley J. Wilcher^{[a]}^{[c]}	Shirley J. Wilcher	1993	2001	Bill Clinton
Charles E. James^{[a]}	Charles E. James	June 12, 2001	January 20, 2009	George W. Bush
Patricia A. Shiu^{[a]}	Patricia Shiu	2009	2017	Barack Obama
Ondray T. Harris^{[a]}	Ondray T. Harris, OFCCP Director (2017-18)	2017	2018	Donald Trump
Craig E. Leen^{[a]}	Craig E. Leen, OFCCP Director (2018-21)	2018	January 20, 2021	Donald Trump
Jenny R. Yang	Jenny Yang	January 21, 2021	April 1, 2023	Joe Biden
Catherine Eschbach		January 30, 2025	September 26, 2025	Donald Trump
Ashley Romanias		September 26, 2025	Current	Donald Trump
