= The Providence Players of Fairfax =

Coordinates: 38°52′27″N 77°10′25″W

The Providence Players of Fairfax is a community theatre company based in Fairfax, Virginia that performs at the James Lee Community Center Theatre in Falls Church, Virginia. The theatre was founded in 1998 as the Mantua Players and performed their first production, You Can't Take It with You, at Mantua Elementary School. They soon moved to Frost Middle School, becoming The Frost Players of Fairfax before moving to the James Lee Center for their 2004–2005 season and becoming The Providence Players of Fairfax.

The company has grown over the years, recently staging their first musical (Company) and their first Shakespeare (Twelfth Night). They have garnered positive reviews in The Washington Post, and have been nominated for 23 Washington Area Theatre Community Honors (WATCH) Awards and have won ten WATCH Awards. In April 2005, the Fairfax County Board of Supervisors presented the Providence Players with a Certificate of Recognition for their "community-based commitment to the performing arts". In 2006 their production of The Women won received First Runner-up for Outstanding Achievement in a Play from the Ruby Griffith Awards program conducted by the British Players. In 2009 their production of All My Sons won the All Around Production Excellence Awards at the Ruby Griffith Awards.
