= Katherine Hanley =

American politician

Secretary of the Commonwealth of Virginia
- In office March 15, 2006 – January 24, 2010
- Governor: Tim Kaine
- Preceded by: Anita Rimler
- Succeeded by: Janet Vestal Kelly

Chair of the Fairfax County Board of Supervisors
- In office February 8, 1995 – December 15, 2003
- Preceded by: Tom Davis
- Succeeded by: Gerry Connolly

Member of the Fairfax County Board of Supervisors from the Providence district
- In office July 1986 – February 8, 1995
- Preceded by: Jim Scott
- Succeeded by: Gerry Connolly

Personal details
- Born: Katherine Anne Keith; March 5, 1943 (age 83) Columbia, Missouri, U.S.
- Party: Democratic
- Spouse: Edward John Hanley
- Education: University of Missouri; Harvard University

Katherine Keith "Kate" Hanley (born March 5, 1943) is an American Democratic politician in Virginia currently serving as Chairman of the Fairfax County Electoral Board. She previously served as Secretary of the Commonwealth of Virginia from 2006 to 2010, Chairman of the Fairfax County Board of Supervisors from 1995 to 2003, as a County Supervisor for the Providence District from 1986 to 1995, and on the Fairfax County School Board from 1984 to 1986.

== Early life and education ==
The daughter of Everett E. and Anna Catherine (Blanchard) Keith, both of whom were teachers, Katherine Anne Keith grew up in Columbia, Missouri and graduated from David H. Hickman High School in 1961. She then attended the University of Missouri where she was a member of Phi Beta Kappa and graduated in 1965 with a B.A. in French Civilization and a B.S. in Secondary Education. Keith next attended Harvard University, where she received a M.A.T. in Social Science in 1966.

On August 6, 1966, she married Edward John Hanley of Endicott, New York. The couple moved to Northern Virginia that same year, and would go on to have two children; son Patrick Keith and daughter Cecelia Anne.

== Career ==
Hanley began her career as a teacher at George Mason Junior-Senior High School in the city of Falls Church. She also worked as a guidance counselor at the University of Missouri before leaving teaching in 1970.

From 1976 to 1982, she and her husband owned and operated the Manor Home Center in Mountain Lake Park, Maryland.

In 1984, Hanley was appointed to the Fairfax County School Board by Providence District Supervisor James M. Scott to replace Ann P. Kahn.

Supervisor Scott announced his resignation in May 1986, and Circuit Court Judge Barnard F. Jennings set a special election to fill the unexpired term for Scott's Providence District seat. Hanley defeated Republican State Delegate Stephen E. Gordy in the July 15 election.

The following March, Hanley announced she would seek reelection to a full term as Supervisor from the Providence District. In the November 3 election, Hanley soundly defeated Republican Myron Smith with 62 percent of the vote.

Despite Republican attempts to link her to then chair of the board Audrey Moore and a general sentiment against incumbents, Hanley was able to retain her seat on the board of supervisors in the 1991 elections, defeating Steve Armstrong.

Tom Davis was elected to Congress in 1994, necessitating a special election to fill his vacant seat as chairman of the board of supervisors. Hanley won the February 1995 special election, defeating Springfield Supervisor Elaine McConnell. Nine months later, Hanley retained the chair by defeating school board chairman Gary L. Jones in the November regular election.

Hanley opted for a less visible presence as chair than some of her predecessors, such as Jack Herrity and Tom Davis, saying that the community did not prefer "show horses over workhorses", and also garnered some criticism as not having a clearly defined vision.

However, the Republicans did not field a candidate against her in the 1999 election, and she handily defeated her three independent challengers, winning by a 3 to 1 margin.

In 2000, Hanley sought the Democratic nomination to run for Lieutenant Governor of Virginia, following the withdrawal of State Senator Emily Couric due to illness, but withdrew in November. Richmond mayor Tim Kaine would ultimately gain his party's nomination in the 2001 election.

In 2003, Hanley did not seek reelection to the board of supervisors, and instead mounted a primary challenge against Jim Moran for Virginia's 8th congressional district in 2004, after Moran damaged himself politically by saying that American Jews were responsible for pushing the country to war with Iraq and that Jewish leaders could prevent war if they wanted to. She abandoned that campaign in November for family reasons.

In July 2004, Governor Mark Warner appointed her to the Commonwealth Transportation Board. Following Tim Kaine's election as governor in November 2005, she was rumored to be a possible contender for Virginia Secretary of Transportation, but was passed over in favor of incumbent Secretary Pierce Homer. Instead, Kaine appointed her as Secretary of the Commonwealth of Virginia following the Virginia General Assembly's rejection of his first nominee, state AFL-CIO President Daniel G. LeBlanc.

Governor Terry McAuliffe appointed Hanley to the Metropolitan Washington Airports Authority Board in November 2014.

She previously served as Secretary of the Fairfax County Electoral Board.

Political offices
| Preceded by Anita Rimler | Secretary of the Commonwealth of Virginia; 2002–2006 | Succeeded by Janet Vestal Kelly |
