= Tom Asimou =

American lawyer specialising in missing person cases

- Born: Thomas G. Asimou; August 7, 1973 (age 52)
- Education: University of Arizona (BA); University of San Francisco School of Law (JD); Boston University (LLM)
- Occupation: Lawyer
- Known for: Probate, Missing persons
- Website: asimoulaw.com

Thomas G. Asimou (born August 7, 1973) is an American lawyer based in Phoenix, Arizona, who is an expert in cases involving missing persons.

== Biography ==
Asimou obtained his Juris Doctor from the University of San Francisco School of Law in 1998. He also holds a Bachelor of Arts from the University of Arizona and a Master of Laws in Taxation from Boston University.

Asimou founded the law firm of Asimou & Associates in 2000. The firm focused on cases such as wills & trusts and commercial litigation. He later began taking missing persons cases to either find their whereabouts or obtain a death declaration from a court. His first experience came from being hired by a life insurance company to defend against a death claim for a missing person. He later found the person living in the Caribbean.

Asimou is a member of the Board of Governors for the University of San Francisco School of Law.
