= A Piece of Cake: A Memoir =

Memoir by Cupcake Brown

- Author: Cupcake Brown
- Language: English
- Subject: Prostitution, drug addiction
- Genre: Non-fiction
- Publisher: Crown
- Publication date: February 2006
- Publication place: United States
- Media type: hardcover; paperback; e-book; audiobook
- Pages: 480
- ISBN: 978-1400052288

A Piece of Cake: A Memoir is an autobiography by Cupcake Brown, published by Crown in 2006. The book describes Brown's descent into teenage prostitution and drug addiction.

Although doubt has been cast as to the veracity of events described in the memoir, Brown maintains that the events in the book are real.

== Plot summary ==
The story begins in January 1975 when the female protagonist, born LaVetteMichelle Brown, gives a short account of why her mother named her Cupcake Brown. Brown's mother died in 1986, when Brown was age 11. Since her biological father only acquired custody because he wanted to receive social security checks, she and her brother were placed in a stranger's foster home, along with several other children. Their foster mother, Diane, forced them to clean her entire house every day and physically abused them if she wasn't satisfied. Diane's biological daughter, Connie, is also portrayed as sadistic, reportedly deriving pleasure from tormenting Brown and the other children who resided in the foster home. For example, she is quick to point out to Brown that she is the real (biological) child of Diane as opposed to being a foster child. Brown believes that Connie feels entitled to cause trouble for the foster children in any way that her cruel mind will allow because of her perceived higher familial status.

Within days of arriving, Brown is raped by her foster mother's nephew, Pete. Brown provides a frank account of how Pete thrusts a glass of rum and coke into her hand, tells her to drink it and how "everything happened so fast" afterwards. Although the drink makes Brown feel very good at first, she proceeds to relate what she describes as being a nightmare. She also decides that since God took her mother away from her as well as allowed the rape to happen to her, then He must not like Brown very much. She then decides that she hates God.

After months of unrelenting abuse, Brown runs away and ends up meeting a prostitute, Candy, who teaches her about life on the streets, including how to smoke marijuana, and introduces her to prostitution. Brown turns her first "trick" at age eleven. Her next foster father, under the guise of "cheerleading practice", traded her LSD and cocaine for oral sex.

She later moved in with her great-aunt in South-Central Los Angeles, where she joined a gang. She narrowly survived a shooting when she was 13, and left the gang.

Later, a boyfriend teaches her how to freebase and introduces her to crack. Brown becomes what she calls a "trash-can junkie", indulging in as many drugs as she could find. When she woke up behind a dumpster one morning, scarcely dressed and possibly close to death, she admitted that she needed help. She then attends an addiction clinic, where she embarks upon her road to recovery, which is successful.

== See also ==
- A Million Little Pieces
