= David Q. Eggleston =

American politician

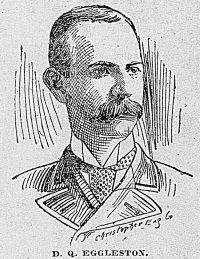
- Drawing of Eggleston, Richmond Dispatch c. 1901

Secretary of the Commonwealth of Virginia
- In office December 9, 1901 – October 17, 1909
- Governor: James Hoge Tyler; Andrew Jackson Montague; Claude A. Swanson
- Preceded by: Joseph T. Lawless
- Succeeded by: B. O. James

Member of the Virginia Senate from the 25th district
- In office December 1, 1897 – December 4, 1901
- Preceded by: Thomas N. Williams
- Succeeded by: James N. Hutcheson

Personal details
- Born: June 10, 1857 Charlotte County, Virginia, U.S.
- Died: October 17, 1909 (aged 52)
- Children: 3, including John W. Eggleston
- Education: University of Virginia

David Quin Eggleston (June 10, 1857 – October 17, 1909) was an American politician who served as a member of the Virginia Senate and as Secretary of the Commonwealth of Virginia.

== Early life and education ==
David Quin Eggleston was born in 1857 in Charlotte County, Virginia, the son of John William Eggleston, a longtime member of the Charlotte County Board of Supervisors, and Lucy Nash Morton.

Eggleston attended Hampden–Sydney College and received a law degree from the University of Virginia. He was in the Beta Theta Pi fraternity.<refBaird, William Raimond (1914). Betas of Achievement (1st ed.). New York City: The Beta Publishing Co. p. 368 – via HathiTrust.</ref>

He married Sue E. Daniel in 1883 and they had 6 children, including John W. Eggleston, who later served as chief justice of the Virginia Superior Court of Appeals.

== Legal and political career ==
Eggleston was admitted to the Virginia Bar in 1879. He practiced law in Charlotte Court House, Virginia, known as Smithville at the time, and began to participate in Democratic Party politics during that period.

In the early 1890s, Eggleston served as vice president of the Virginia Real Estate Exchange. In 1892, Eggleston moved to Washington, D.C. to serve as clerk for the United States House of Representatives Committee on Expenditures in the Department of Agriculture.

In 1897, Eggleston was elected as a member of the Senate of Virginia, representing Charlotte and Mecklenburg Counties. He served one term from 1897 to 1901.

In May 1901, he was elected as one of the 100 members of the Virginia Constitutional Convention. While a member of the convention, he proposed several unsuccessful measures, including abolishing the county courts and city circuit courts and eliminating most state funding for schools that served African American students. Eggleston voted with the majority to impose a system of poll taxes which resulted in the disenfranchisement of black voters and reduced the number of white voters in half.

== Secretary of the Commonwealth ==
In 1901, the Virginia General Assembly elected Eggleston to serve as Secretary of the Commonwealth of Virginia. The 1902 constitution made the office of secretary elective by the voters, and in 1905, Eggleston won the popular election to remain in office. As secretary, Eggleston was named as a defendant in an unsuccessful lawsuit that the Negro Industrial Association of Virginia filed against the commonwealth to contest the voting restrictions that were enacted by the Constitutional Convention. Eggleston was again the Democratic candidate for secretary in 1909, but he fell ill with pneumonia during the campaign.

=== Death ===
Eggleston died on October 17, 1909, and was buried in the family cemetery at Charlotte Court House, Virginia.
