= Office of Federal Contract Compliance Programs =

U.S. federal government agency

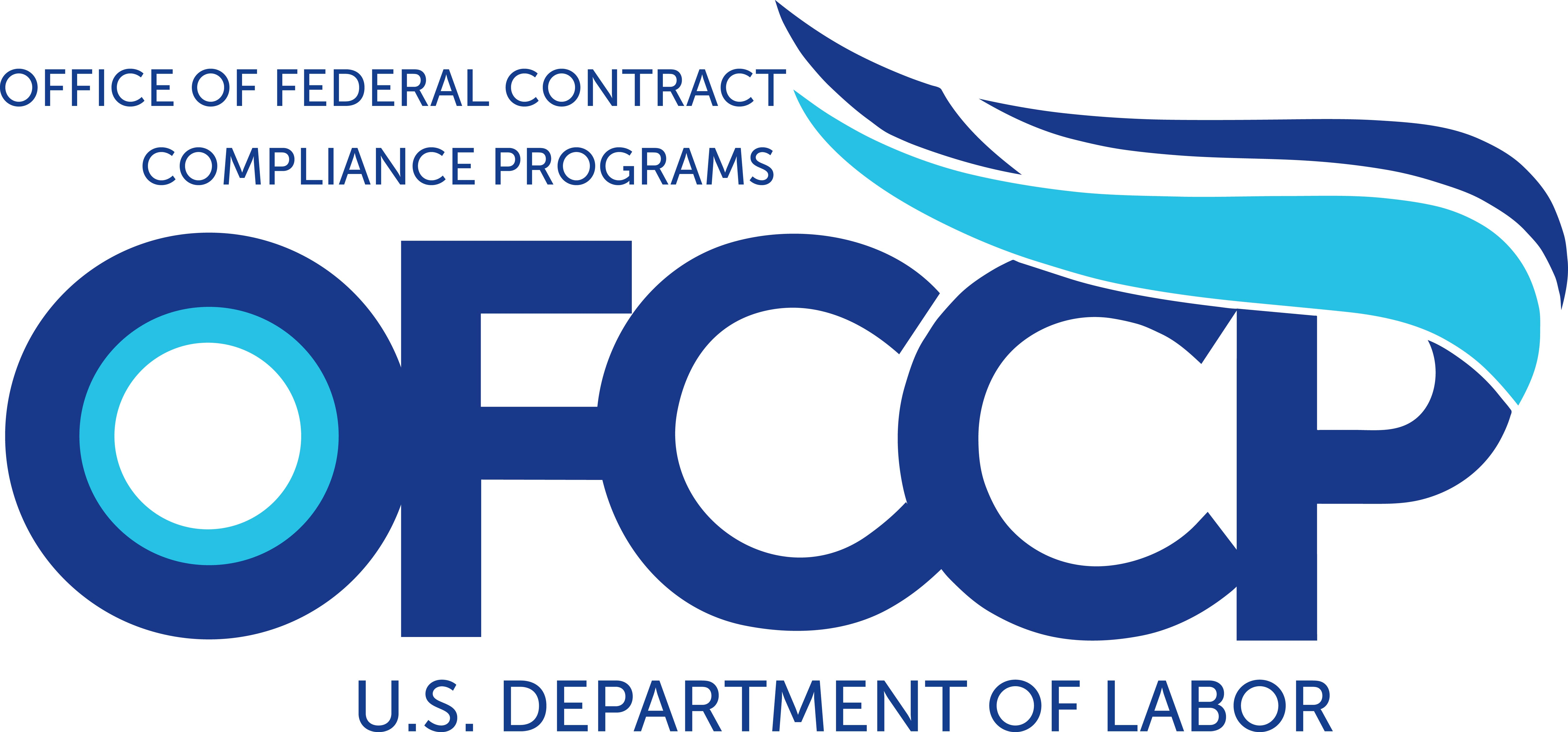

Agency overview
- Formed: 1977; 49 years ago
- Preceding agency: President's Committee on Equal Employment Opportunity
- Jurisdiction: Federal government of the United States
- Headquarters: Washington, D.C., U.S.
- Employees: 77
- Agency executive: Ashley Romanias, Director
- Website: www.dol.gov/agencies/ofccp

The Office of Federal Contract Compliance Programs (OFCCP) is part of the U.S. Department of Labor. OFCCP is responsible for ensuring that employers doing business with the federal government comply with the laws and regulations requiring nondiscrimination. This mission is based on the underlying principle that employment opportunities generated by Federal dollars should be available to all Americans on an equitable and fair basis.

== Statutes and executive orders ==
OFCCP administers and enforces two equal employment opportunity laws: Section 503 of the Rehabilitation Act of 1973, as amended, and the Vietnam Era Veterans' Readjustment Assistance Act of 1974, as amended, 38 U.S.C. § 4212 (VEVRAA). Together, these laws make it illegal for contractors and subcontractors doing business with the federal government to discriminate in employment because of disability or status as a protected veteran. Its regulations can be found at CFR Title 41 Chapter 60: Public Contracts and Property Management.

Until it was rescinded in 2025, OFCCP also administered Executive Order 11246. That order prohibited contractors and subcontractors doing business with the federal government from discriminating in employment because of race, color, religion, sex, sexual orientation, gender identity, or national origin. In addition, the order made it illegal for contractors and subcontractors to discriminate against applicants or employees because they inquire about, discuss, or disclose their compensation or that of others, subject to certain limitations.

== Agency history ==
Seal

OFCCP, as it is today, was created in 1978 with Executive Order 12086 by President Jimmy Carter through a consolidation of all the Affirmative Action enforcement responsibilities at each federal agency with Executive Order 11246 to the United States Secretary of Labor.

The origins of the agency trace back to President Franklin D. Roosevelt and World War II when he signed Executive Order 8802, preventing discrimination based on race by government contractors.

In 1953, President Dwight D. Eisenhower created the President's Committee on Government Contracts with Executive Order 10479. The order was a follow-up to Executive Order 10308 signed by President Harry S. Truman in 1951 establishing the anti-discrimination Committee on Government Contract Compliance.

In 1961, President Kennedy issued Executive Order 10925 which created the President's Committee on Equal Employment Opportunity. This called for people to take affirmative action to ensure that applicants are hired and employees are treated during employment without regard to race, creed, color or national origin.

On September 24, 1965, President Lyndon B. Johnson signed EO 11246 transferring responsibility for supervising and coordinating the Federal Contract Compliance from the President's Committee to the Secretary of Labor who established the Office of Federal Contract Compliance (OFCC).

Executive Order 11375 by President Lyndon Johnson in 1967 added sex discrimination to OFCCP's mandate. In 1975, the name was changed from OFCC to OFCCP by President Gerald Ford. This reflected the addition of the responsibility to enforce laws prohibiting discrimination against the disabled and veterans.

=== Bush era ===
In 2003, the agency adopted its Active Case Management (ACM) procedures to speed up the processing of Supply and Service cases. This system was developed by then Deputy Director to the Deputy Assistant Secretary, William Doyle. The system was developed because of a lower number of high profile discrimination cases developed after the end of the Clinton Administration. This disparity was because of slow down in traditional enforcement implemented in 2001 and 2002.

The ACM procedure signaled to some that OFCCP would no longer be enforcing the heart of its mandate, affirmative action. Critics alleged the implementation of the ACM system also caused the agency to start 'creaming' its cases and only pursuing those cases that would produce a compensation or other discrimination case – an alleged violation of the NationsBank court case.

In 2005, the agency has recently helped develop new applicant and record keeping regulations covering internet applicants.

=== Obama era ===
The agency received increased attention under the Obama administration. This was signaled by the elimination of the Employment Standards Administration. During this time, some argued that the career staff lacked competence or were motivated by job security. Additionally, other staff were criticized for lack of experience.

Contrary to federal law, critics alleged that the agency gave out its annual reviews based on a bell curve, wherein actual performance did not matter. Many SES employees were reassigned to work at OFCCP.

=== First Trump era ===
The Trump era saw a decrease in the agency's resources. At the end of the first Trump administration, OFCCP had less than half the staff that they had ten years before. Initially, Ondray Harris was chosen as the director of the agency. His successor, Craig Leen, oversaw the implementation of Executive Order 13950.

=== Biden era ===
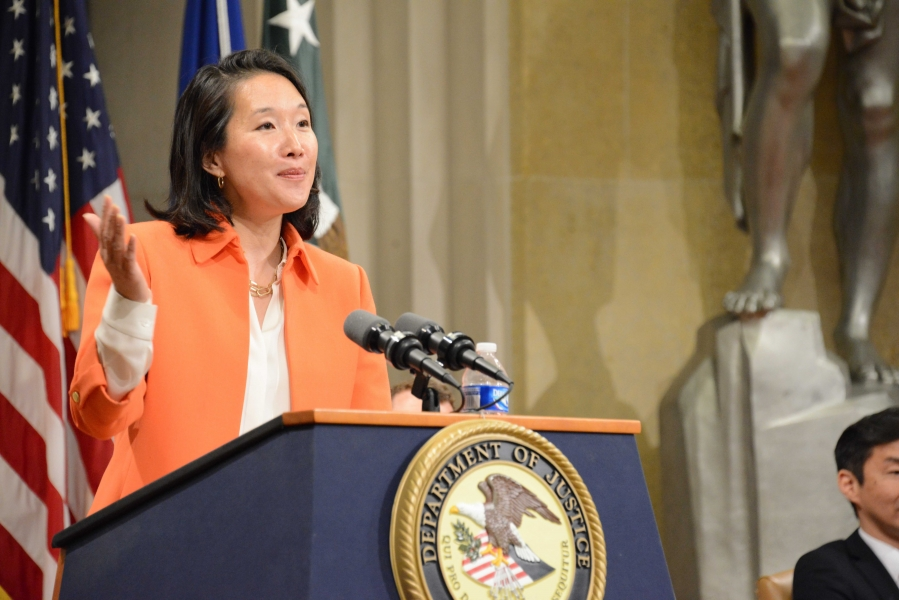
Yang as featured speaker at the Department of Justice's 2015 Asian American and Pacific Islander Heritage Month Program

Under Director Jenny Yang, the agency tried to right itself after the first Trump administration. It focused on rebuilding its enforcement capabilities and on equal pay.

=== Second Trump era ===
The agency was targeted for elimination in the Project 2025. Trump's Executive Order 14173 revoked Executive Order 11246. Throughout most of 2025 the agency existed in limbo while Congress decided what to do with its remaining mission. Catherine Eschbach, brought in to eliminate the agency, left after six months for a position with the EEOC.

== Past directors ==
Past directors

== Recent events ==
In 2020, the OFCCP lost a $400 million lawsuit against Oracle.

== Organization ==
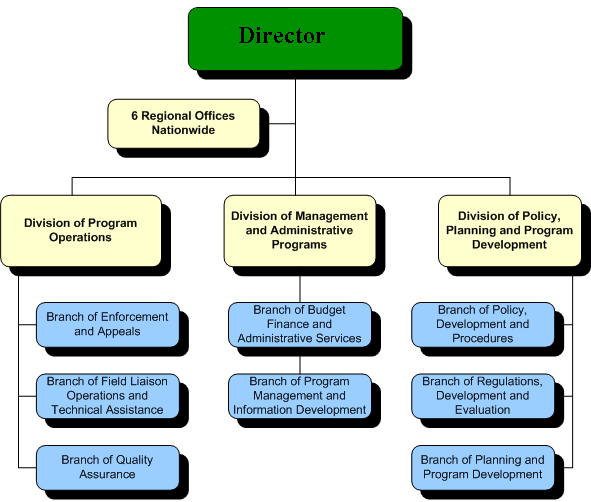
Organization chart

Until January 20, 2025, the OFCCP operated from six regional offices, covering the following states:

- Mid-Atlantic: Delaware, District of Columbia, Maryland, Pennsylvania, Virginia, West Virginia
- Midwest: Illinois, Indiana, Iowa, Kansas, Michigan, Minnesota, Missouri, Nebraska, Ohio, Wisconsin
- Northeast: Connecticut, Maine, Massachusetts, New Hampshire, New Jersey, New York, Puerto Rico, Rhode Island, Virgin Islands, Vermont
- Pacific: Alaska, Arizona, California, Guam, Hawaii, Idaho, Nevada, Oregon, Washington
- Southeast: Alabama, Florida, Georgia, Kentucky, Mississippi, North Carolina, South Carolina, Tennessee
- Southwest and Rocky Mountain: Arkansas, Colorado, Louisiana, Montana, New Mexico, North Dakota, Oklahoma, South Dakota, Texas, Utah, Wyoming

The national office had four divisions: Management & Administrative, Policy and Program Development, Program Operations, and the Office of Enforcement.

== Constituency groups ==
- National Industrial Liaison Groups
- American Association for Access, Equity and Diversity
- National Urban League
- National Association for the Advancement of Colored People
- League of United Latin American Citizens

== See also ==
- United Steelworkers v. Weber
- Equal Opportunity Employment
