= Lorton =

Lorton may refer to:

- Lorton, Cumbria, England
- Lorton, Nebraska, United States
- Lorton, Virginia, United States
  - Lorton station (Auto Train), an Amtrak station in Lorton, Virginia
  - Lorton station (VRE), a Virginia Railway Express station in Lorton, Virginia
