= Lorton station =

Lorton station may refer to:

- Lorton station (Auto Train)
- Lorton station (VRE)
