= Newington Forest, Virginia =

- Census-designated place
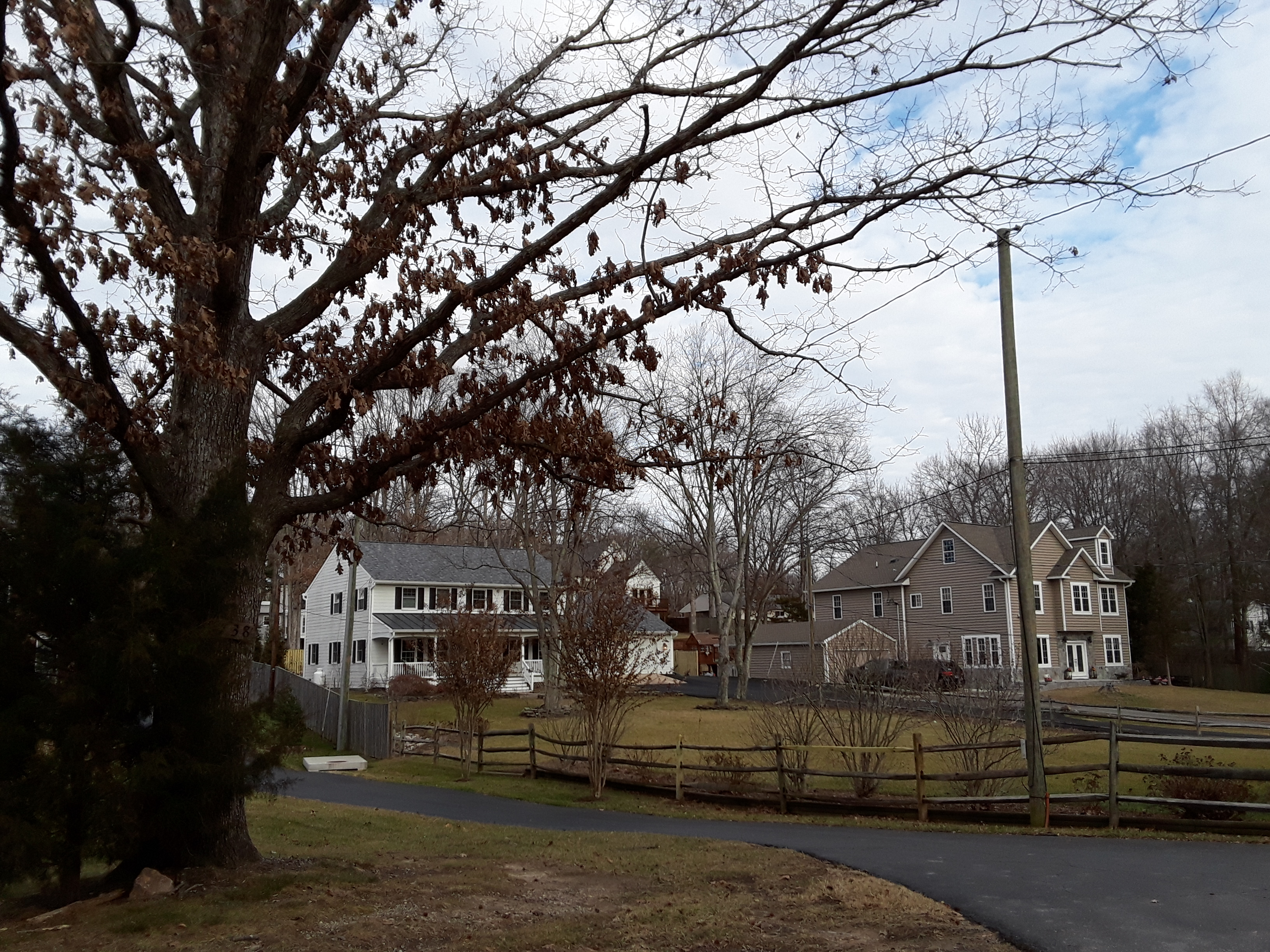
- Houses in Newington Forest CDP, January 2018

- Location within Northern Virginia Location within Virginia Location within the United States
- Coordinates: 38°44′21″N 77°14′25″W
- Country: United States
- State: Virginia
- County: Fairfax

Area
  - Total: 3.4 sq mi (8.7 km^{2})
  - Land: 3.3 sq mi (8.6 km^{2})
  - Water: 0.039 sq mi (0.1 km^{2})
- Elevation: 290 ft (88 m)

Population (2020)
  - Total: 12,957
  - Density: 3,754/sq mi (1,449.5/km^{2})
- Time zone: UTC−5 (Eastern (EST))
  - Summer (DST): UTC−4 (EDT)
- ZIP codes: 22079, 22153
- FIPS code: 51-55758
- GNIS feature ID: 2584893

Newington Forest is a census-designated place in Fairfax County, Virginia, United States. As of the 2020 census, Newington Forest had a population of 12,957. It is part of the Washington metropolitan area. It includes the Newington Forest subdivision and several nearby neighborhoods of southern Springfield and northern Lorton .

== Geography ==
Newington Forest is located in southern Fairfax County. Its borders are Silver Brook and Rocky Branch to the south, Pohick Creek to the east, the Fairfax County Parkway (State Route 286) to the north, Hooes Road to the west, and Silverbrook Road to the southwest. Neighboring communities are Burke to the north, West Springfield at the northeastern corner of Newington Forest, Newington to the east, Laurel Hill to the south, and Crosspointe and South Run to the west. Pohick Road runs through the center of the CDP. Downtown Washington, D.C. is 19 miles (31 km) to the northeast, and the city of Fairfax is 10 miles (16 km) to the northwest.

According to the U.S. Census Bureau, the Newington Forest CDP has a total area of 3.4 square miles (8.7 km^{2}), of which 3.3 square miles (8.6 km^{2}) is land and 0.04 square miles (0.1 km^{2}), or 1.36%, is water.

== Demographics ==
Historical population
| Census | Pop. | Note | %± |
|---|---|---|---|
| 2010 | 12,442 | | — |
| 2020 | 12,957 | | 4.1% |
U.S. Decennial Census; 2010 2020

Newington Forest was first listed as a census designated place in the 2010 U.S. census formed from parts of Lorton CDP and Newington CDP and additional area.

=== Racial and ethnic composition ===
Newington Forest CDP, Virginia – Racial and ethnic composition Note: the US Census treats Hispanic/Latino as an ethnic category. This table excludes Latinos from the racial categories and assigns them to a separate category. Hispanics/Latinos may be of any race.
| Race / Ethnicity (NH = Non-Hispanic) | Pop 2010 | Pop 2020 | % 2010 | % 2020 |
|---|---|---|---|---|
| White alone (NH) | 7,037 | 6,283 | 56.56% | 48.49% |
| Black or African American alone (NH) | 1,363 | 1,458 | 10.95% | 11.25% |
| Native American or Alaska Native alone (NH) | 33 | 12 | 0.27% | 0.09% |
| Asian alone (NH) | 1,807 | 2,280 | 14.52% | 17.60% |
| Native Hawaiian or Pacific Islander alone (NH) | 14 | 24 | 0.11% | 0.19% |
| Other race alone (NH) | 34 | 83 | 0.27% | 0.64% |
| Mixed race or Multiracial (NH) | 502 | 851 | 4.03% | 6.57% |
| Hispanic or Latino (any race) | 1,652 | 1,966 | 13.28% | 15.17% |
| Total | 12,442 | 12,957 | 100.00% | 100.00% |

=== 2020 census ===
As of the 2020 census, Newington Forest had a population of 12,957. The median age was 38.6 years. 25.2% of residents were under the age of 18 and 11.6% of residents were 65 years of age or older. For every 100 females there were 97.3 males, and for every 100 females age 18 and over there were 94.4 males age 18 and over.

100.0% of residents lived in urban areas, while 0.0% lived in rural areas.

There were 4,341 households in Newington Forest, of which 41.2% had children under the age of 18 living in them. Of all households, 64.6% were married-couple households, 11.6% were households with a male householder and no spouse or partner present, and 20.2% were households with a female householder and no spouse or partner present. About 15.6% of all households were made up of individuals and 5.2% had someone living alone who was 65 years of age or older.

There were 4,401 housing units, of which 1.4% were vacant. The homeowner vacancy rate was 0.4% and the rental vacancy rate was 1.4%.
