= Crosspointe, Virginia =

- Census-designated place
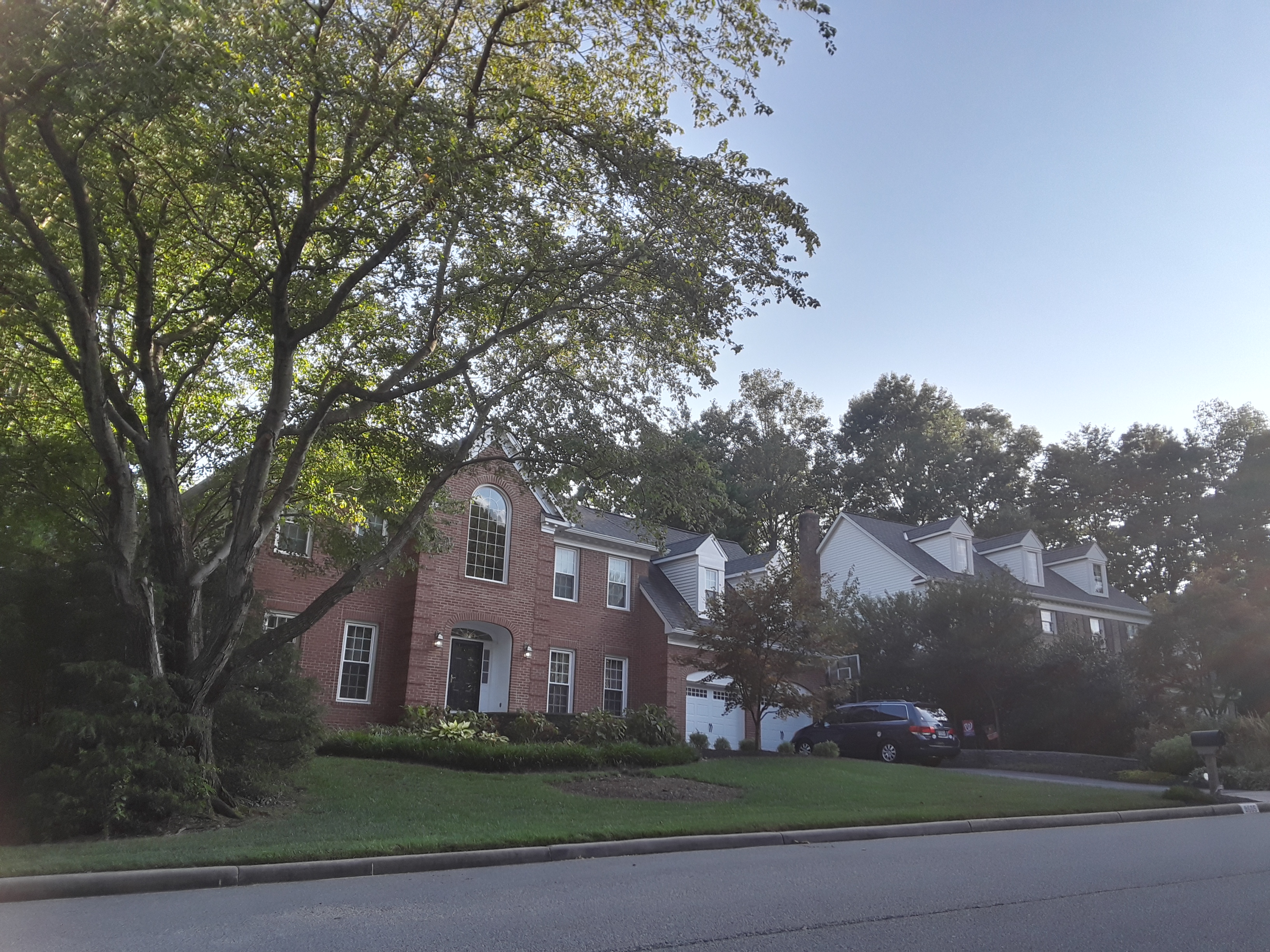
- Houses in Crosspointe, August 2019

- Location within Northern Virginia Location within Virginia Location within the United States
- Coordinates: 38°43′40″N 77°15′57″W
- Country: United States
- State: Virginia
- County: Fairfax
- Founded: May 17, 1983

Government
  - Type: Board of Directors, Community Manager
  - Community Manager: Heather McDevitt
  - Assistant Community Manager: Mary Demeter

Area
  - Total: 2.22 sq mi (5.75 km^{2})
  - Land: 2.20 sq mi (5.70 km^{2})
  - Water: 0.019 sq mi (0.05 km^{2})
- Elevation: 300 ft (91 m)

Population (2020)
  - Total: 5,722
  - Density: 2,600/sq mi (1,003.9/km^{2})
- Time zone: UTC−5 (Eastern (EST))
  - Summer (DST): UTC−4 (EDT)
- ZIP codes: 22039, 22079
- Area codes: 703, 571
- FIPS code: 51-20436
- GNIS feature ID: 2584834
- Website: http://www.crosspointe.info/

Crosspointe is a census-designated place in Fairfax County, Virginia, United States. The population as of the 2020 census was 5,722.

== History ==
On May 17, 1983, the William Lyon Company of Newport Beach, California, which owned the land that made up Crosspointe established the Crosspointe Village Homeowners' Association, a not for profit corporation, to provide services to Crosspointe's residents. Since then, the community has evolved into an upper middle class suburb of Washington, D.C.

== Recreational and cultural activities ==
The Crosspointe Community Center, located on Glen Eagles Lane (the headquarters of the Association), can be rented out for private parties.

=== Amenities and recreation ===
Crosspointe is home to several green spaces, with around 11 miles of trails.

Crosspointe is also near the Laurel Hill Golf Club in Lorton.

Crosspointe is about one mile from the Fairfax County Parkway Trail, approximately three miles from the Lakeridge Marina Waterfront Trail, and about five miles from the Bull Run Occoquan Trail. Crosspointe is also home to Heron Pond, a fishing pond. Giles Run, a tributary of the Occoquan River, begins at Heron Pond in Crosspointe and flows six miles to the southeast, ending at the Occoquan River in Mason Neck.

Crosspointe is home to two pools, one adjacent the clubhouse on Glen Eagles Lane, and another on Oak Chase Circle. There are also eight tennis courts on the grounds.

== Transportation ==
Two major state highways directly serve Crosspointe: Virginia State Route 123 (Ox Road), which forms the northeastern boundary and also connects the CDP to Fairfax, Virginia State Route 286 (Fairfax County Parkway), and Virginia State Route 620 (Braddock Road) in the west, and Woodbridge, Interstate 95, and U.S. Route 1 in the east; and Virginia State Route 600 which connects Crosspointe to Lorton and Lorton Road in the east.

== Geography ==
The CDP is located in southeastern Fairfax County on the northeastern side of Virginia Route 123, 6 miles (10 km) north of Woodbridge and 10 miles (16 km) south of Fairfax. It is bordered to the north by the South Run CDP, to the northeast by the Newington Forest CDP, and to the southeast by the Laurel Hill CDP. According to the U.S. Census Bureau, Crosspointe has a total area of 2.22 square miles (5.75 km^{2}), of which 2.20 square miles (5.70 km^{2}) is land and 0.019 square miles (0.05 km^{2}), or 0.84%, is water. The CDP border is defined as Ox Road to the southwest, Hooes Road to the east, and South Run to the north.

== Climate ==
The climate in this area is characterized by hot, humid summers and generally mild to cool winters. According to the Köppen Climate Classification system, Crosspointe has a humid subtropical climate, abbreviated "Cfa" on climate maps.

Climate data for Crosspointe, Virginia, 1959–present
Month	Jan	Feb	Mar	Apr	May	Jun	Jul	Aug	Sep	Oct	Nov	Dec	Year
Record high °F (°C)	79 (26.1)	79 (26.1)	89 (31.7)	95 (35)	99 (37.2)	101 (38.3)	104 (40)	105 (40.6)	101 (38.3)	94 (34.4)	86 (30)	79 (26.1)	105 (40.6)
Average high °F (°C)	43.5 (6.4)	46.6 (8.1)	55.4 (13)	66.8 (19.3)	75.7 (24.3)	84.1 (28.9)	88.1 (31.2)	86.4 (30.2)	79.7 (26.5)	68.7 (20.4)	57.7 (14.3)	46.8 (8.2)	66.6 (19.2)
Average low °F (°C)	28.4 (-2)	30.1 (-1.1)	37.1 (2.8)	46.6 (8.1)	56.3 (13.5)	65.6 (18.7)	70.5 (21.4)	69.2 (20.7)	62.2 (16.8)	50.3 (10.2)	40.6 (4.8)	31.9 (-0.1)	49.1 (9.5)
Record low °F (°C)	-5 (-20.6)	4 (-15.6)	14 (-10)	24 (-4.4)	36 (2.2)	47 (8.3)	54 (12.2)	49 (9.4)	39 (3.9)	29 (-1.7)	16 (-8.9)	3 (-16.1)	-5 (-20.6)
Average precipitation inches (mm)	2.8 (71)	2.6 (66)	3.5 (88)	3 (75)	3.8 (97)	3.5 (90)	3.8 (97)	3.8 (97)	3.5 (89)	3.2 (80)	3 (77)	3.1 (79)	39.6 (1007)
Average snowfall inches (cm)	4.9 (12.4)	5.5 (14)	2 (5.1)	0 (0)	0 (0)	0 (0)	0 (0)	0 (0)	0 (0)	0 (0)	0.7 (1.8)	2.8 (7.1)	15.9 (40.4)
Average precipitation days	10	9	11	10	11	10	10	9	8	8	8	9	113

== Government ==
Crosspointe is a census-designated place within Fairfax County; therefore, schools, roads, and law enforcement are provided by the county.

=== Board of directors ===
The board is the legislative branch of the community government, led by the president, currently Howard Kaufer, and the vice-president, currently Larry Rice. According to the CC&Rs, the Association has the power to do anything a corporation "organized under the laws of the State of California" may lawfully do in order to maintain the peace, health, comfort, safety, general welfare of its members, subject to the regulations set forth in the CC&Rs. The Association may also construct, renovate, and landscape the Common Property and employ personnel to perform such activities.

The board also has the power to appoint and remove, at will, the three members of the Architectural Review Committee. Both the committee and the board usually meet at the Crosspointe Community Center.

=== Representation ===
The part of Crosspointe in the Springfield District, including the Community Center, is within Virginia's 10th congressional district, currently represented in Congress by Representative Jennifer Wexton (D-Leesburg), while the part of Crosspointe in the Mt. Vernon District is within Virginia's 11th congressional district, currently represented in Congress by Representative Gerry Connolly (D-Mantua). Crosspointe is represented by Kathy Tran (D-West Springfield) in the state House of Delegates, and by George Barker (D-Clifton) in the state Senate.

== Local media ==
Crosspointe lies within the distribution zone for two national newspapers, the Washington Post, and the Washington Times, as well as for the local Fairfax Times. Crosspointe is also covered by AOL's Patch service's Fairfax Station and Lorton divisions.

== Education ==
=== Primary and secondary schools ===
As a part of Fairfax County, Crosspointe is served by the Fairfax County Public Schools and private schools. Crosspointe is served by one high school, South County High School, and one middle school, South County Middle School, both in adjacent Laurel Hill.

==== Public elementary schools ====
- Silverbrook Elementary School
- Halley Elementary School

=== Colleges and universities ===
Crosspointe is near a few higher education centers, including George Mason University, Agora University and Holy Transfiguration College.

=== Public libraries ===
Crosspointe is served by the Lorton Library, a branch of the Fairfax County Public Library System.

== Demographics ==
Historical population
Census	Pop.	Note	%±
2010	5,802		—
2020	5,722		−1.4%
U.S. Decennial Census; 2010 2020

Crosspointe was first listed as a census designated place in the 2010 U.S. census formed from part of the Lorton CDP and additional area.

Crosspointe CDP, Virginia – Racial and ethnic composition Note: the US Census treats Hispanic/Latino as an ethnic category. This table excludes Latinos from the racial categories and assigns them to a separate category. Hispanics/Latinos may be of any race.
Race / Ethnicity (NH = Non-Hispanic)	Pop 2010	Pop 2020	% 2010	% 2020
White alone (NH)	4,359	3,783	75.13%	66.11%
Black or African American alone (NH)	284	391	4.89%	6.83%
Native American or Alaska Native alone (NH)	10	2	0.17%	0.03%
Asian alone (NH)	699	768	12.05%	13.42%
Native Hawaiian or Pacific Islander alone (NH)	4	2	0.07%	0.03%
Other race alone (NH)	13	22	0.22%	0.38%
Mixed race or Multiracial (NH)	156	367	2.69%	6.41%
Hispanic or Latino (any race)	277	387	4.77%	6.76%
Total	5,802	5,722	100.00%	100.00%

At the 2020 census (some information from the 2022 American Community Survey) there were 5,722 people, 1,819 housing units and 1,670 households residing in the CDP. The population density was 2,600.9 inhabitants per square mile (1,003.9/km^{2}). The average housing unit density was 826.8 per square mile (319.1/km^{2}). The racial makeup of the CDP was 67.65% White, 6.97% African American, 0.12% Native American, 13.42% Asian, 0.05% Pacific Islander, 1.26% from other races, and 10.52% from two or more races. Hispanic or Latino of any race was 6.76% of the population.

Of the households, 87.9% were married couple families, 4.6% were a male family householder with no spouse, and 6.4% were a female family householder with no spouse.The average family household had 3.29 people.

The median age was 45.3, 22.6% of people were under the age of 18, and 16.5% were 65 years of age or older. The largest ancestry is the 16.3% who had German ancestry, 14.8% spoke a language other than English at home, and 13.0% were born outside the United States, 81.3% of whom were naturalized citizens.

The median income for a household in the CDP was over $250,000. 19.8% of the population were military veterans, and 76.0% had a batchelor's degree or higher. In the CDP 3.2% of the population was below the poverty line, including 6.0% of those under age 18 and 1.0% of those age 65 or over, with 2.6% of the population without health insurance.

As of 2019, Crosspointe had an estimated median household income of $193,472.
