= South Run, Virginia =

- Census-designated place
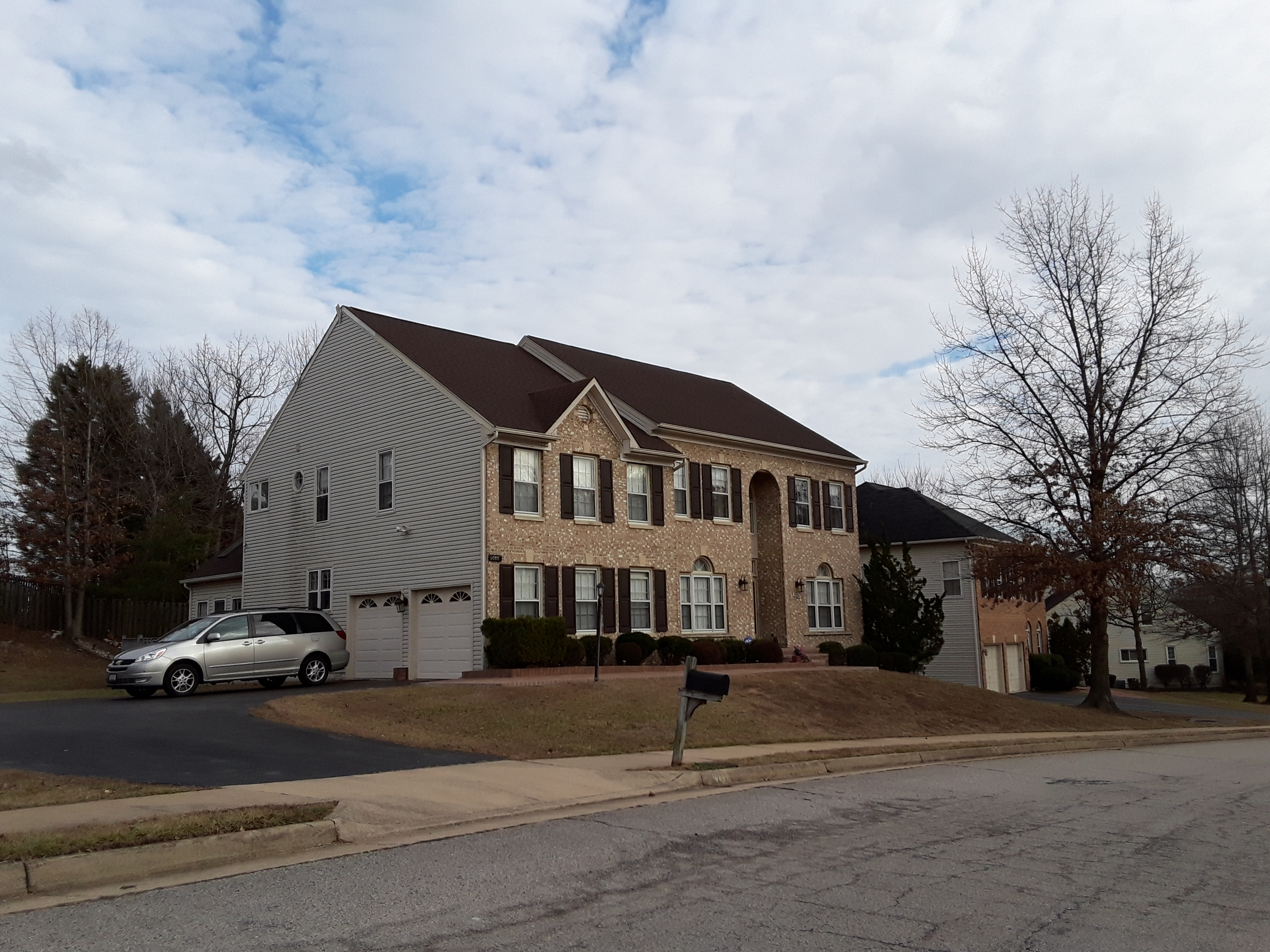
- Houses in South Run CDP, January 2018

- Location within Northern Virginia Location within Virginia Location within the United States
- Coordinates: 38°44′54″N 77°16′23″W
- Country: United States
- State: Virginia
- County: Fairfax

Area
  - Total: 2.60 sq mi (6.73 km^{2})
  - Land: 2.53 sq mi (6.56 km^{2})
  - Water: 0.066 sq mi (0.17 km^{2})
- Elevation: 300 ft (91 m)

Population (2020)
  - Total: 6,462
  - Density: 2,521/sq mi (973.2/km^{2})
- Time zone: UTC−5 (Eastern (EST))
  - Summer (DST): UTC−4 (EDT)
- ZIP codes: 22039, 22153
- FIPS code: 51-74120
- GNIS feature ID: 2584922

South Run is a census-designated place in Fairfax County, Virginia, United States. As of the 2020 census, South Run had a population of 6,462.

== Geography ==
The South Run CDP is in southern Fairfax County, bordered to the northwest by Burke Lake Park, to the north by Burke, to the east by Newington Forest, and to the south by Crosspointe. The CDP's borders are formed by the Fairfax County Parkway (Virginia Route 286) to the north; Hooes Road to the east; South Run, a tributary of South Run, and Silverbrook Road to the south; and Ox Road (Virginia State Route 123) to the southwest. The city of Fairfax is 8 miles (13 km) to the north, and downtown Washington, D.C. is 20 miles (32 km) to the northeast.

According to the U.S. Census Bureau, the total area of the South Run CDP is 2.60 square miles (6.73 km^{2}), of which 2.53 square miles (6.56 km^{2}) is land and 0.066 square miles (0.17 km^{2}), or 2.52%, is water. South Run, a tributary of Pohick Creek and part of the Potomac River watershed, flows from west to east through the center of CDP. At the southeast corner of the CDP it is impounded as Lake Mercer.

== Demographics ==
Historical population
| Census | Pop. | Note | %± |
|---|---|---|---|
| 2010 | 6,389 | | — |
| 2020 | 6,462 | | 1.1% |
U.S. Decennial Census; 2010 2020

South Run was first listed as a census designated place in the 2010 U.S. census.

South Run CDP, Virginia – Racial and ethnic composition Note: the US Census treats Hispanic/Latino as an ethnic category. This table excludes Latinos from the racial categories and assigns them to a separate category. Hispanics/Latinos may be of any race.
| Race / Ethnicity (NH = Non-Hispanic) | Pop 2010 | Pop 2020 | % 2010 | % 2020 |
|---|---|---|---|---|
| White alone (NH) | 4,902 | 4,428 | 76.73% | 68.52% |
| Black or African American alone (NH) | 320 | 384 | 5.01% | 5.94% |
| Native American or Alaska Native alone (NH) | 9 | 6 | 0.14% | 0.09% |
| Asian alone (NH) | 710 | 831 | 11.11% | 12.86% |
| Native Hawaiian or Pacific Islander alone (NH) | 8 | 1 | 0.13% | 0.02% |
| Other race alone (NH) | 15 | 19 | 0.23% | 0.29% |
| Mixed race or Multiracial (NH) | 145 | 397 | 2.27% | 6.14% |
| Hispanic or Latino (any race) | 280 | 396 | 4.38% | 6.13% |
| Total | 6,389 | 6,462 | 100.00% | 100.00% |
