= Laurel Hill, Virginia =

- Census-designated place
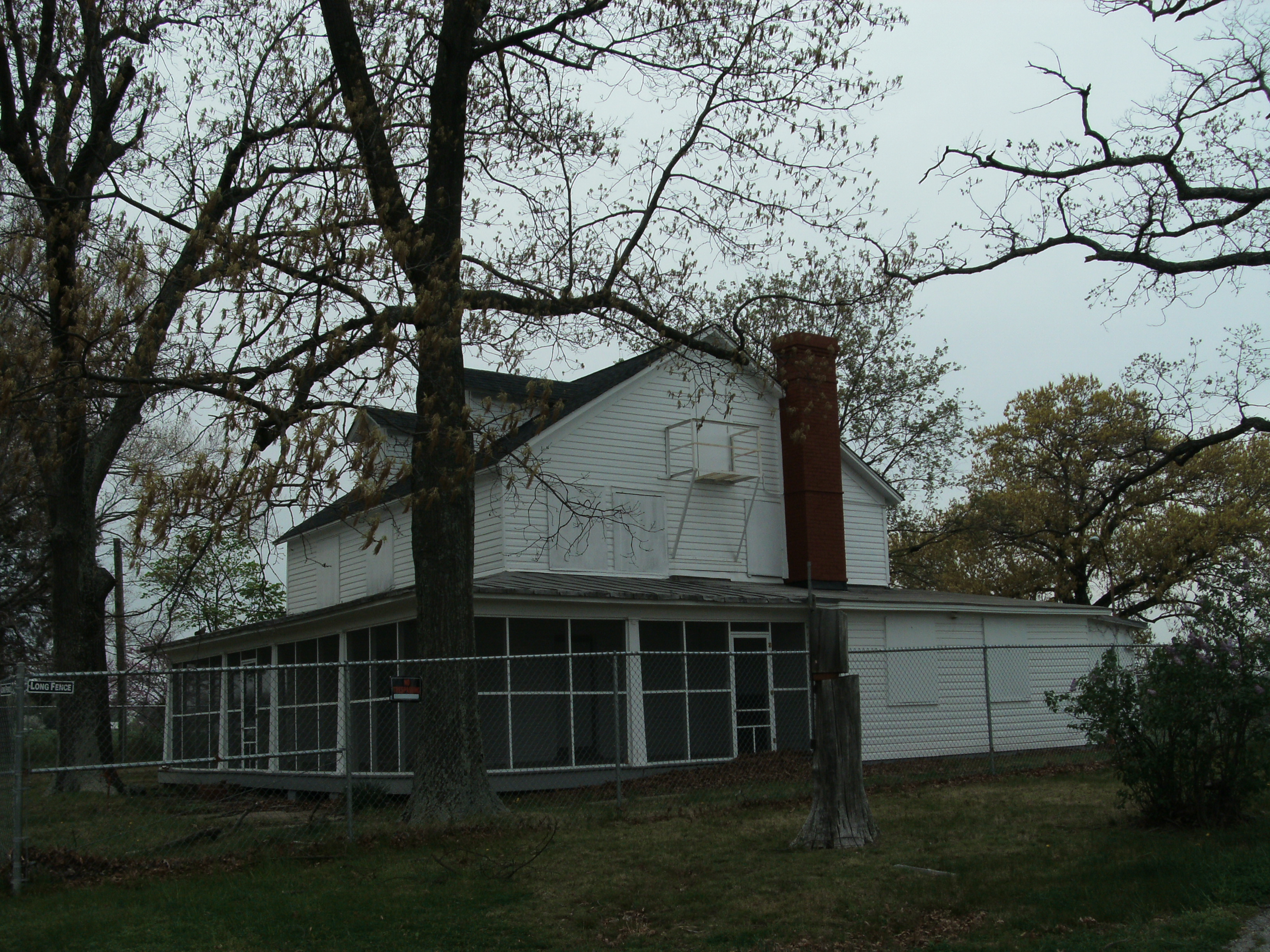
- Barrett House, 2009

- Location within Northern Virginia Location within Virginia Location within the United States
- Coordinates: 38°42′50″N 77°14′56″W
- Country: United States
- State: Virginia
- County: Fairfax

Area
  - Total: 4.53 sq mi (11.73 km^{2})
  - Land: 4.46 sq mi (11.55 km^{2})
  - Water: 0.069 sq mi (0.18 km^{2})
- Elevation: 220 ft (67 m)

Population (2020)
  - Total: 8,307
  - Density: 1,834/sq mi (708.2/km^{2})
- Time zone: UTC−5 (Eastern (EST))
  - Summer (DST): UTC−4 (EDT)
- ZIP code: 22079
- FIPS code: 51-44430
- GNIS feature ID: 2585798

Laurel Hill is a census-designated place in Fairfax County, Virginia, United States. The population at the 2020 census was 8,307. Formerly part of the Lorton CDP, it comprises most of what was formerly the Lorton Reformatory grounds, which were purchased by Fairfax County in 2002 following the prison's closing and redeveloped as a new suburban community. The name "Laurel Hill" was adopted from Laurel Hill House, an 18th-century structure which had served as the residence of the Superintendent of the Reformatory, and originally was the home of Revolutionary War patriot William Lindsay.

== Geography ==
Laurel Hill is in southern Fairfax County and is bordered to the northwest by Crosspointe, to the north by Newington Forest, to the east by Lorton, and to the south by Prince William County. Via Interstate 95 and Interstate 395 it is 19 miles (31 km) northeast to Washington, D.C.

According to the U.S. Census Bureau, the Laurel Hill CDP has a total area of 4.5 square miles (11.7 km^{2}), of which 4.46 square miles (11.55 km^{2}) is land and 0.069 square miles (0.18 km^{2}), or 1.51%, is water.

== Demographics ==
Historical population
Census	Pop.	Note	%±
2010	6,855		—
2020	8,307		21.2%
U.S. Decennial Census; 2010 2020

Laurel Hill was first listed as a census designated place in the 2010 U.S. census formed from part of Lorton CDP.

Laurel Hill CDP, Virginia – Racial and ethnic composition Note: the US Census treats Hispanic/Latino as an ethnic category. This table excludes Latinos from the racial categories and assigns them to a separate category. Hispanics/Latinos may be of any race.
Race / Ethnicity (NH = Non-Hispanic)	Pop 2010	Pop 2020	% 2010	% 2020
White alone (NH)	2,457	2,644	35.84%	31.83%
Black or African American alone (NH)	1,341	1,870	19.56%	22.51%
Native American or Alaska Native alone (NH)	13	6	0.19%	0.07%
Asian alone (NH)	2,089	2,234	30.47%	26.89%
Native Hawaiian or Pacific Islander alone (NH)	6	20	0.09%	0.24%
Other race alone (NH)	22	49	0.32%	0.59%
Mixed race or Multiracial (NH)	353	639	5.15%	7.69%
Hispanic or Latino (any race)	574	845	8.37%	10.17%
Total	6,855	8,307	100.00%	100.00%

=== 2020 census ===
At the 2020 census (some information from the 2022 American Community Survey) there were 8,307 people, 3,128 housing units and 2,731 households residing in the CDP. The population density was 1,833.8 inhabitants per square mile (708.2/km^{2}). The average housing unit density was 690.5 per square mile (266.7/km^{2}). The racial makeup of the CDP was 33.21% White, 23.11% African American, 0.13% Native American, 27.03% Asian, 0.24% Pacific Islander, 3.45% from other races, and 12.82% from two or more races. Hispanic or Latino of any race was 10.17% of the population.

Of the households, 56.6% were married couples, 7.9% were a male householder with family and no spouse, and 30.2% were a female householder with family and no spouse. The average family household had 3.36 people.

The median age was 40.5, 23.4% of people were under the age of 18, and 11.0% were 65 years of age or older. The largest ancestry was the 10.5% who had Irish ancestry, 38.7% spoke a language other than English at home, and 31.4% were born outside the United States, 83.0% of whom were naturalized citizens.

The median income for a household in the CDP was $128,239, and the median income for a family was $148,964. 11.5% of the population were military veterans, and 59.3% had a batchelor's degree or higher. In the CDP2.3% of the population was below the poverty line, including 0.7% of those under age 18 and 2.8% of those age 65 or over, with 2.6% of the population without health insurance.

=== 2010 census ===
The population as of the 2010 census was 6,855.
