= Lorton station (VRE) =

Railroad station in Lorton, Virginia, US

Lorton
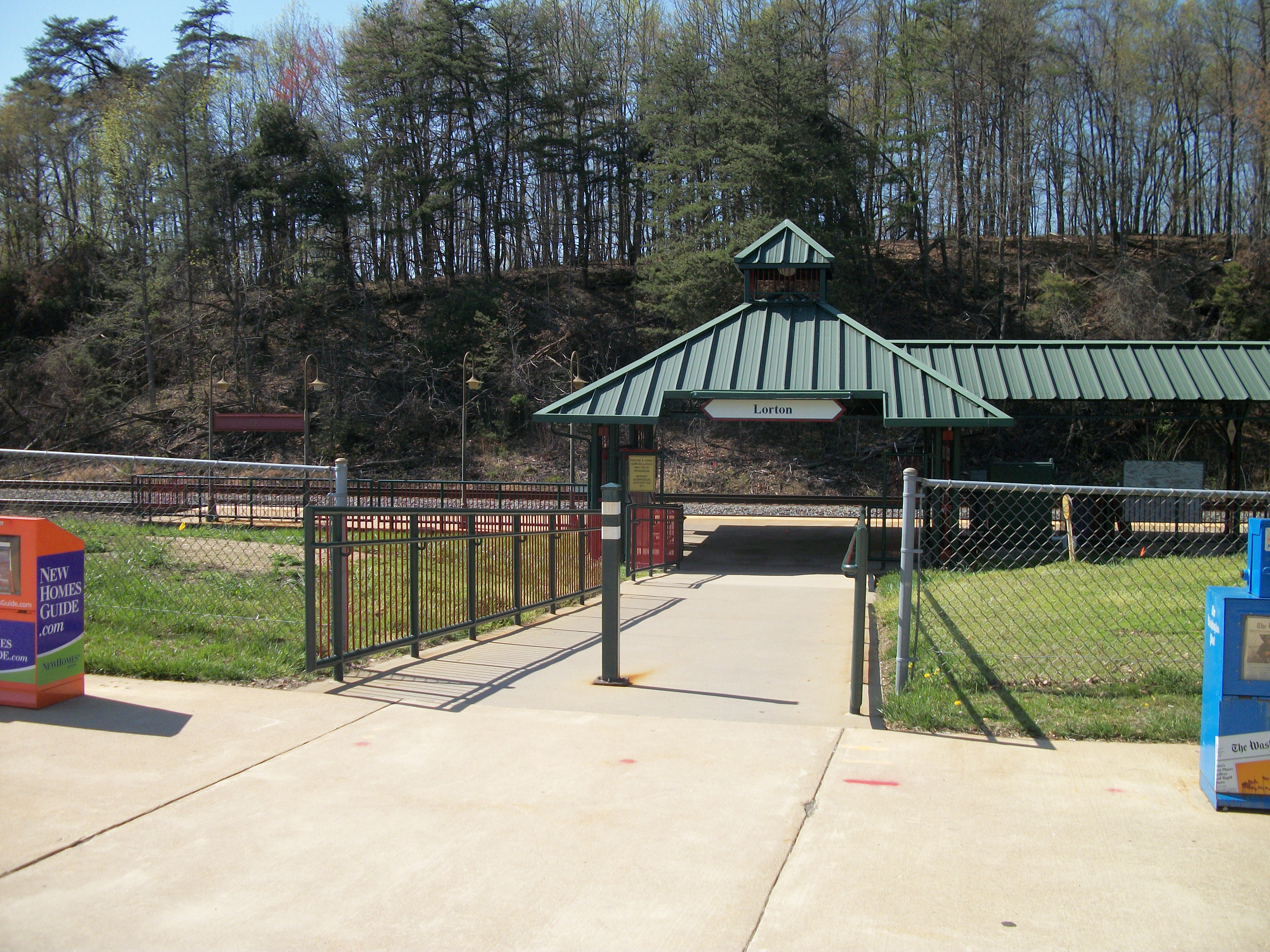
- The entrance ramp to Lorton VRE station

General information
- Location: 8990 Lorton Station Boulevard; Lorton, Virginia; United States
- Coordinates: 38°42′54″N 77°12′52″W
- Owner: Virginia Railway Express
- Line: RF&P Subdivision (CSXT)
- Platforms: 1
- Tracks: 2
- Bus stands: 3
- Connections: Fairfax Connector: 171, 305, 371; Vamoose Bus

Construction
- Parking: Yes
- Cycle facilities: Yes
- Accessible: Yes

Other information
- Station code: LOR
- Fare zone: 4

History
- Opened: 1995

Services
Preceding station	Virginia Railway Express	Following station
Woodbridge toward Spotsylvania	Fredericksburg Line	Franconia–Springfield toward Union Station
Location

Lorton station is a railroad station in Lorton, Virginia, served by the Virginia Railway Express (VRE) Fredericksburg Line. The station is one mile north of Amtrak's Lorton station, the northern terminus of the Auto Train.

== History ==
Lorton opened as an infill station in January 1995, two years after VRE began service. An extension to the platform was completed in 2017, allowing use of all doors on eight-car trains. The platform extension opened on December 11, 2017, with a ribbon cutting ceremony held on March 8, 2018.

Future work at the station will include a second platform and pedestrian overpass to accommodate construction of the fourth track by DRPT. On July 2, 2020, this project was cancelled by the Northern Virginia Transportation Authority (NVTA) and deferred until 4th track construction.
