= Lorton station (Auto Train) =

Amtrak Auto Train station in Lorton, Virginia

Lorton, VA
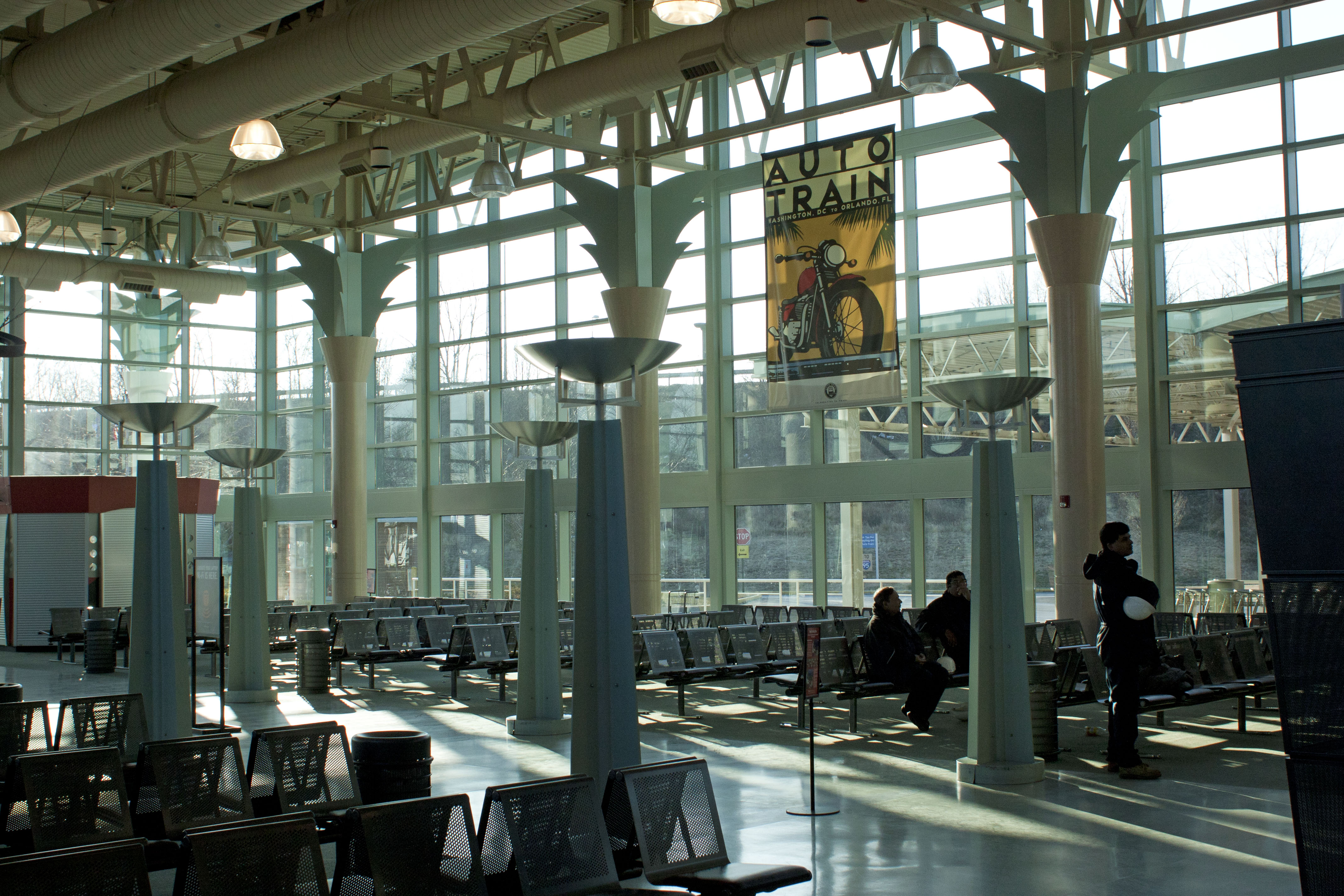
- The waiting area at Lorton

General information
- Location: 8006 Lorton Road; Lorton, Virginia; United States
- Coordinates: 38.7084°N 77.2207°W
- Owner: Amtrak
- Platforms: 1 side platform

Construction
- Parking: Short-term only
- Accessible: Yes

Other information
- Station code: Amtrak: LOR

History
- Opened: 1971
- Closed: 1981–1983
- Rebuilt: 2000

Passengers
- FY 2025: 265,950 (Amtrak)

Services
Preceding station	Amtrak	Following station
Florence (Service stop only) toward Sanford	Auto Train	Terminus
Former services
Preceding station	auto-train	Following station
Sanford Terminus	Sanford–Lorton	Terminus
Location

Lorton station is a railroad terminal in Lorton, Virginia. It is the northern terminal for Amtrak's Auto Train, which operates between this station and Sanford station in Florida. When Auto-Train was originally established in Lorton in 1971, the station house was still under construction. Until it was completed sometime between 1972 and 1975, it consisted of tents and pre-fabricated houses and trailers, and the parking lot was still paved only with gravel. When it was completed, it included a former caboose and boxcar previously owned by the Richmond, Fredericksburg and Potomac Railroad that was converted into a gift shop. As with the rest of Auto Train, the station closed in 1981 and was reopened in 1983 when Amtrak acquired the service.

The current station, which opened in 2000 as a replacement for the original Lorton Auto-Train station, features a large, modern waiting area designed in a modern Art Deco style, with high glass walls, a small gift shop, a snack bar, and a children's playground. There is one long low-level platform (which is 1,480 feet (451 m) long) designed for Auto Train boarding and 6 vehicle ramps for boarding vehicles onto the 20+ autoracks that are on the Auto Train. This station is one mile south of the Virginia Railway Express Lorton station. No other Amtrak trains stop at either station.

== Image gallery ==
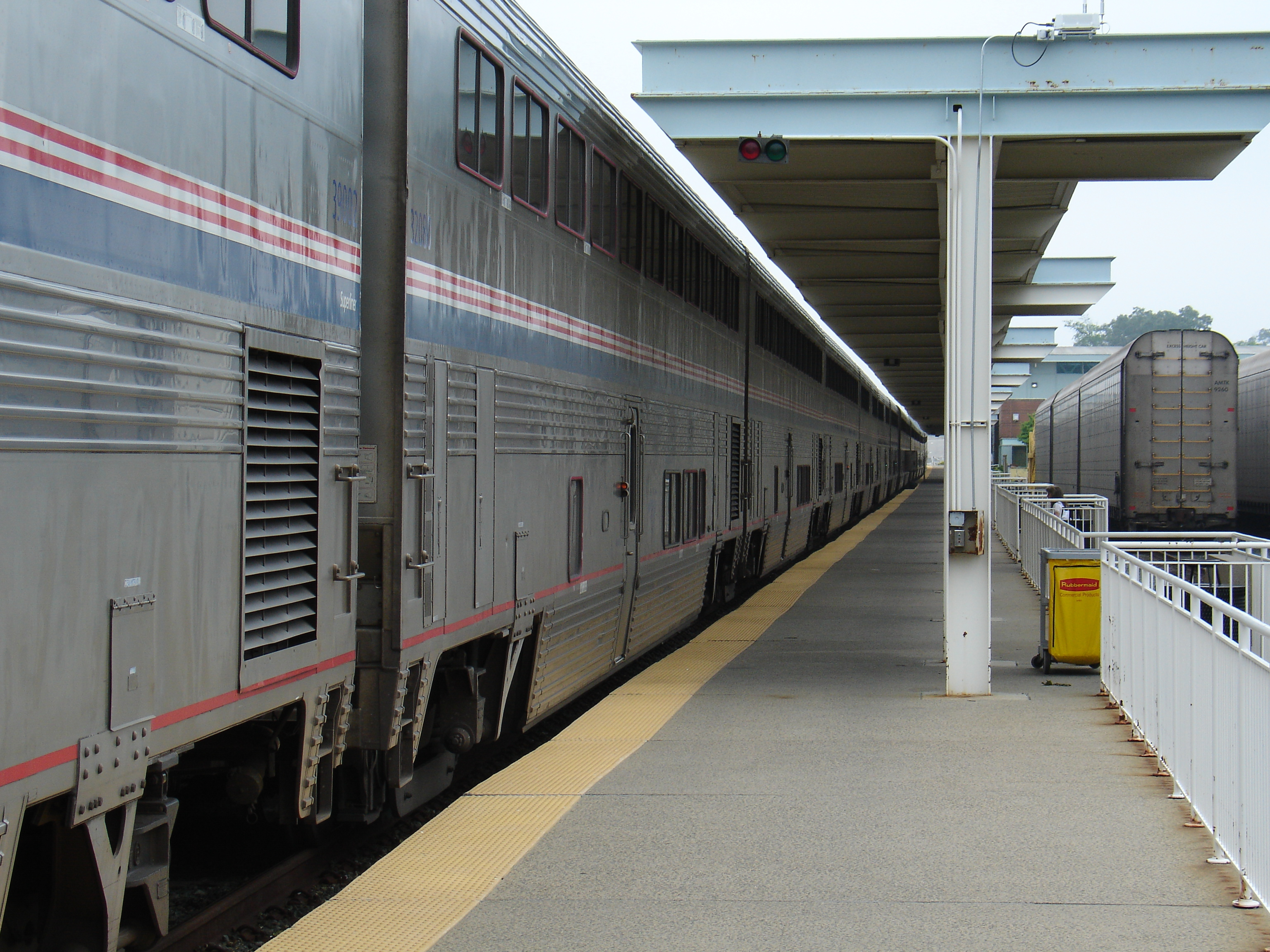
Contemporary platform at Lorton station. Superliners are lined up at the left

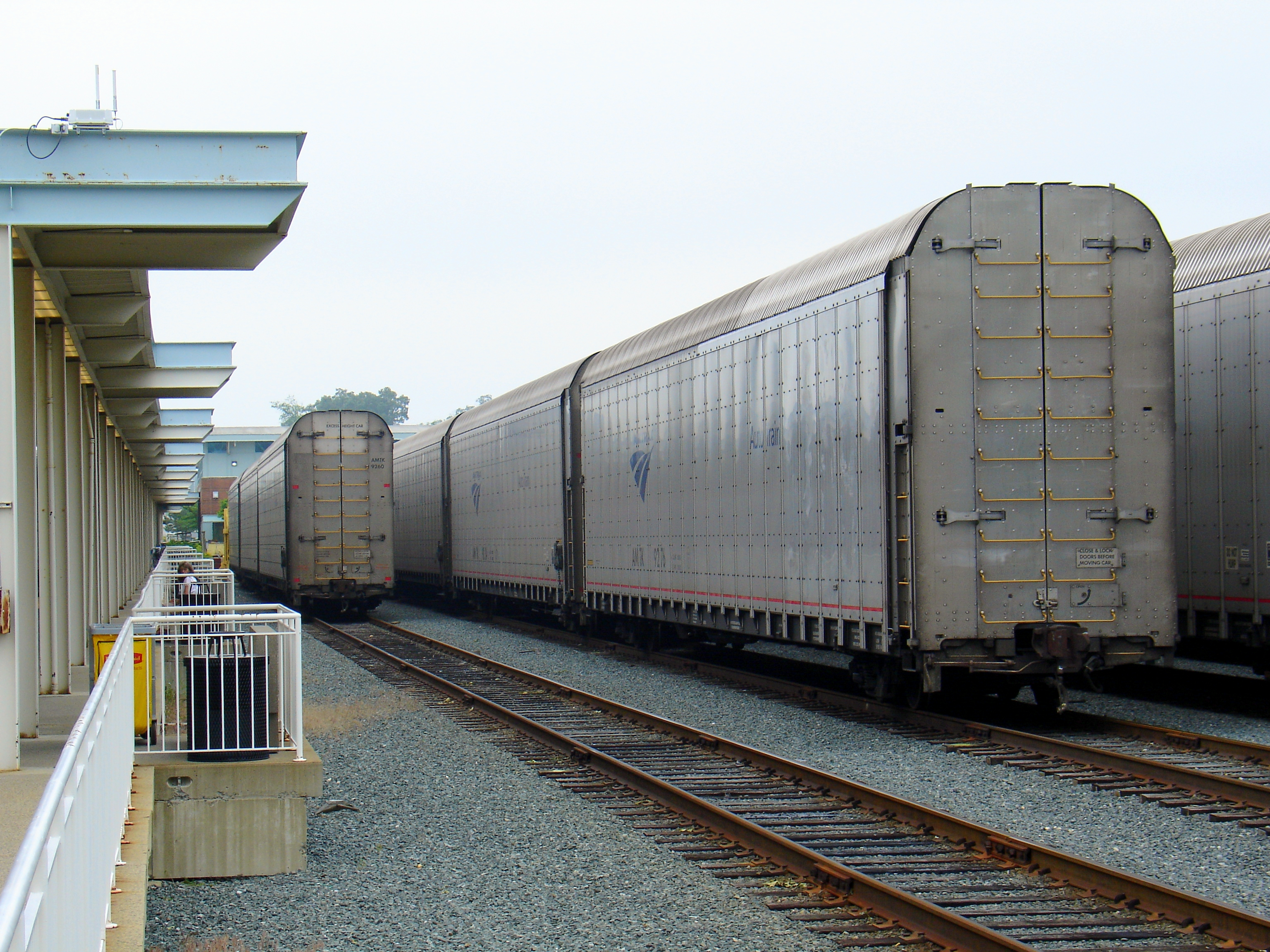
Autoracks are lined up on the right.

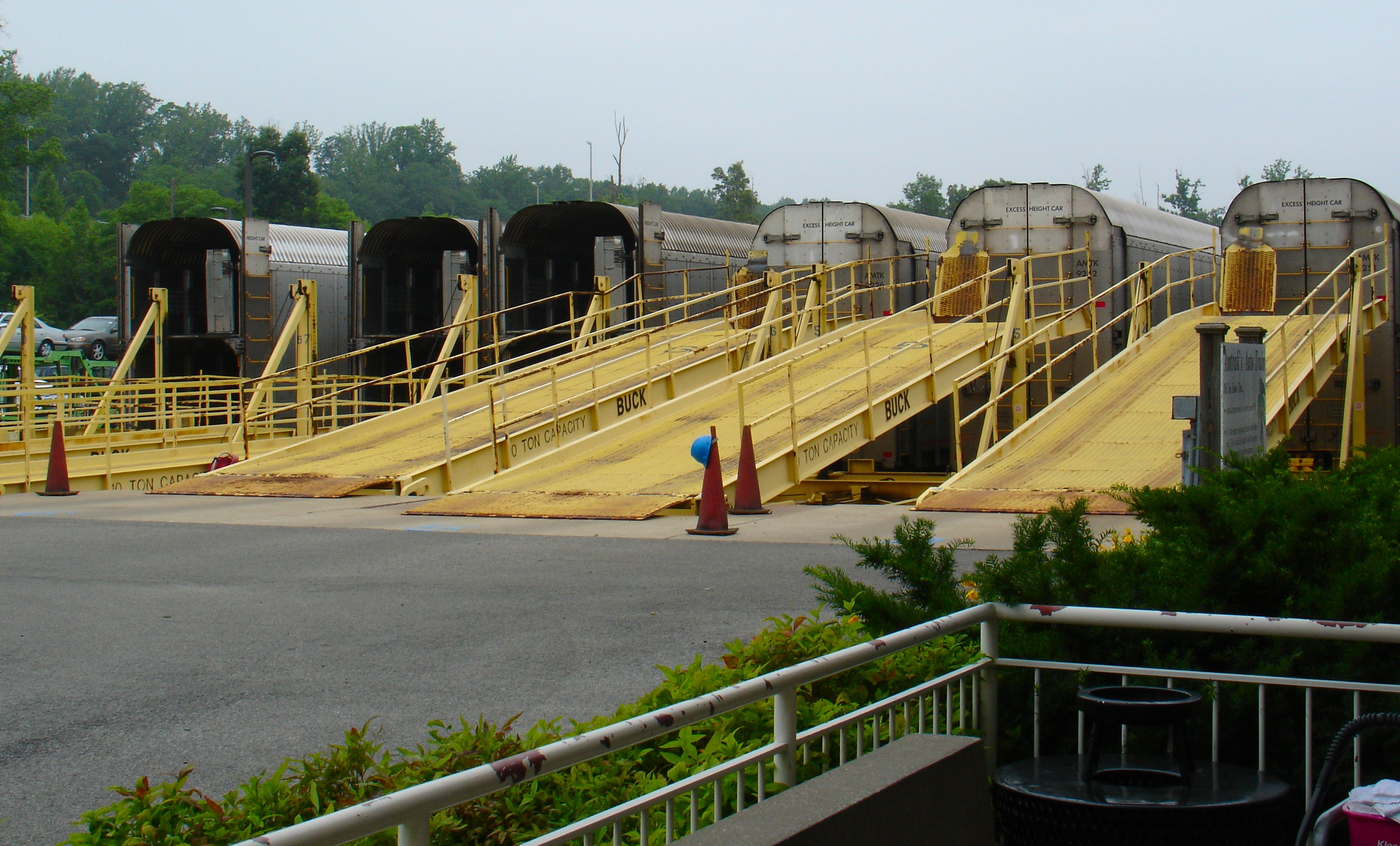
Autoracks lined up at their loading ramps
