= Lorton, Virginia =

- Census-designated place
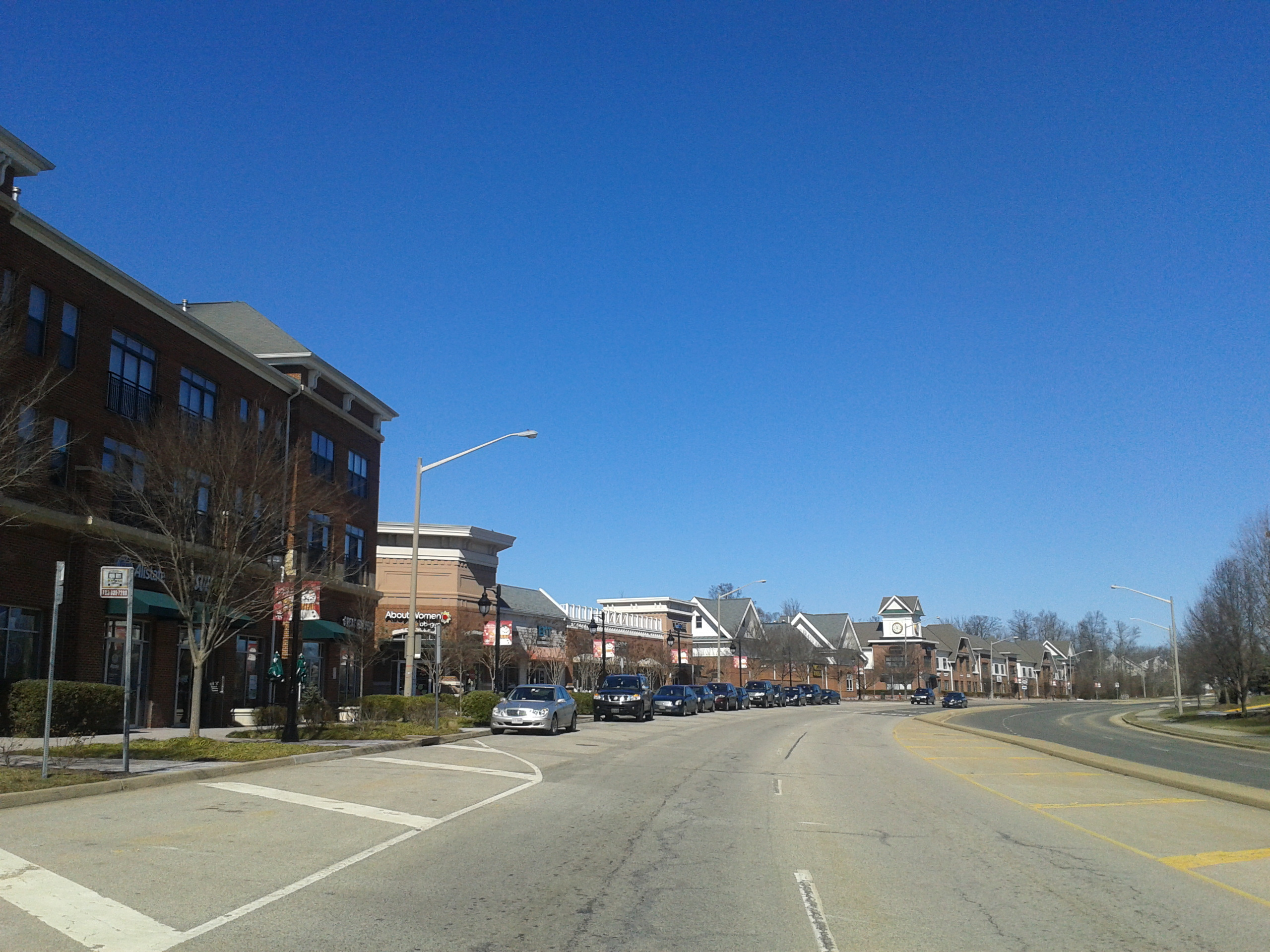
- Shops along Lorton Station Blvd, 2016

- Location of Lorton in Fairfax County, Virginia

- Location within Northern Virginia Location within Virginia Location within the United States
- Coordinates: 38°42′18″N 77°14′1″W
- Country: United States
- State: Virginia
- County: Fairfax County, Virginia

Area
  - Total: 5.4 sq mi (13.9 km^{2})
  - Land: 5.3 sq mi (13.7 km^{2})
  - Water: 0.077 sq mi (0.2 km^{2})
- Elevation: 144 ft (44 m)

Population (2020)
  - Total: 20,072
  - Density: 3,508/sq mi (1,354.6/km^{2})
- Time zone: UTC−5 (Eastern (EST))
  - Summer (DST): UTC−4 (EDT)
- ZIP Codes: 22079, 22199
- Area codes: 703, 571
- FIPS code: 51-47064
- GNIS feature ID: 1495046

Lorton is a census-designated place (CDP) in Fairfax County, Virginia, United States. The population was 20,072 as of the 2020 census.

== History ==
Lorton is named for a village in the Lake District National Park, Cumbria, in England. Joseph Plaskett of the Cumbrian village settled in southern Fairfax County, running a general store and opening the Lorton Valley Post Office on November 11, 1875.

Before the identity of Lorton, the commercial center was Colchester, and the spiritual and historical center of the community around which the leading citizens of the time revolved was Pohick Church, where George Washington and George Mason were at times members of the vestry.

From the early 20th century until November 2001, Lorton was the site of a District of Columbia correctional facility called the Lorton Reformatory which, among other things, detained approximately 168 women from the women's suffrage movement from the Washington, D.C. area from June to December 1917. For the 2010 census, the area around the former Lorton Reformatory was assigned to the Laurel Hill census-designated place, reducing the area and population of the Lorton CDP.

A Nike missile site was built at Lorton in 1955, and remained until 1973.

Lorton is one of the two stations that serve Amtrak's Auto Train which carries passengers and their vehicles non-stop to Sanford, Florida, in the Orlando area. The Lorton and Occoquan Railroad once operated between the Lorton Reformatory and Occoquan, with connection to the Richmond, Fredericksburg and Potomac Railroad.

Historic landmarks in the surrounding area include Gunston Hall, George Mason's home; Belvoir, which was William Fairfax's home; the Market; and now the Fort Belvoir Army Corps of Engineers base and Cranford Church. Woodlawn Plantation and Mount Vernon, the latter being George Washington's home on the Potomac River, lie farther to the east.

== Geography ==
Lorton is located in southern Fairfax County at 38°42′18″N 77°14′1″W (38.704915, −77.233573). It is bordered to the west by Laurel Hill, to the north by Newington, to the east by Fort Belvoir, to the southeast by Mason Neck, and to the southwest by Woodbridge in Prince William County.

According to the United States Census Bureau, the Lorton CDP has a total area of 5.4 square miles (13.9 km^{2}), of which 5.3 square miles (13.7 km^{2}) is land and 0.1 square miles (0.2 km^{2}), or 1.39%, is water. The elevation ranges from sea level at the Prince William County line (the Occoquan River) to slightly over 200 feet (61 m) along Furnace Road at the CDP's western edge.

U.S. Route 1 (Richmond Highway) and Interstate 95 pass through Lorton, leading northeast 15 miles (24 km) to Alexandria and 19 miles (31 km) to Washington, D.C., and south 34 miles (55 km) to Fredericksburg. The Amtrak Auto Train to and from Florida has Lorton as its northern terminal.

== Demographics ==
=== Racial and ethnic composition ===
Lorton CDP, Virginia – Racial and ethnic composition Note: the US Census treats Hispanic/Latino as an ethnic category. This table excludes Latinos from the racial categories and assigns them to a separate category. Hispanics/Latinos may be of any race.
Race / Ethnicity (NH = Non-Hispanic)	Pop 2000	Pop 2010	Pop 2020	% 2000	% 2010	% 2020
White alone (NH)	7,960	5,864	5,126	44.75%	31.51%	25.54%
Black or African American alone (NH)	6,049	5,414	6,421	34.01%	29.09%	31.99%
Native American or Alaska Native alone (NH)	43	32	29	0.24%	0.17%	0.14%
Asian alone (NH)	1,336	3,353	3,678	7.51%	18.02%	18.32%
Native Hawaiian or Pacific Islander alone (NH)	23	33	33	0.13%	0.18%	0.16%
Other race alone (NH)	43	82	130	0.24%	0.44%	0.65%
Mixed race or Multiracial (NH)	600	716	966	3.37%	3.85%	4.81%
Hispanic or Latino (any race)	1,732	3,116	3,689	9.74%	16.74%	18.38%
Total	17,786	18,610	20,072	100.00%	100.00%	100.00%

=== 2020 census ===
As of the 2020 census, Lorton had a population of 20,072. The median age was 36.8 years. 25.4% of residents were under the age of 18 and 11.7% of residents were 65 years of age or older. For every 100 females there were 91.4 males, and for every 100 females age 18 and over there were 87.5 males age 18 and over.

99.7% of residents lived in urban areas, while 0.3% lived in rural areas.

There were 6,834 households in Lorton, of which 40.5% had children under the age of 18 living in them. Of all households, 51.1% were married-couple households, 15.8% were households with a male householder and no spouse or partner present, and 28.5% were households with a female householder and no spouse or partner present. About 22.9% of all households were made up of individuals and 8.9% had someone living alone who was 65 years of age or older.

There were 7,178 housing units, of which 4.8% were vacant. The homeowner vacancy rate was 1.0% and the rental vacancy rate was 6.5%.

Racial composition as of the 2020 census
Race	Number	Percent
White	5,582	27.8%
Black or African American	6,549	32.6%
American Indian and Alaska Native	124	0.6%
Asian	3,696	18.4%
Native Hawaiian and Other Pacific Islander	34	0.2%
Some other race	1,936	9.6%
Two or more races	2,151	10.7%
Hispanic or Latino (of any race)	3,689	18.4%

=== 2010 census ===
As of the census of 2010, there were 18,610 people, 6,422 households, and 4,637 families residing in the CDP. The population density was 3,508.7 inhabitants per square mile (1,354.7/km^{2}). There were 6,726 housing units at an average density of 1,268.1 per square mile (489.6/km^{2}). The racial makeup of the CDP was 39.0% White, 29.9% African American, 0.3% Native American, 18.2% Asian, 0.2% Pacific Islander, 7.3% some other race, and 5.1% from two or more races. Hispanic or Latino of any race were 16.7% of the population.

There were 6,422 households, out of which 45.0% had children under the age of 18 living with them, 52.5% were headed by married couples living together, 14.4% had a female householder with no husband present, and 27.8% were non-families. Of all households, 22.8% were made up of individuals, and 5.9% were someone living alone who was 65 years of age or older. The average household size was 2.88, and the average family size was 3.39.

In the CDP, the population was spread out, with 27.8% under the age of 18, 8.0% from 18 to 24, 33.0% from 25 to 44, 24.0% from 45 to 64, and 7.2% who were 65 years of age or older. The median age was 34.2 years. For every 100 females, there were 91.1 males. For every 100 females age 18 and over, there were 87.7 males.

For the period 2010 through 2014, the estimated median annual income for a household was $90,820 and the median income for a family was $94,965. Male full-time workers had a median income of $54,534 versus $54,441 for females. The per capita income for the CDP was $37,487. About 0.9% of families and 3.2% of the total population were below the poverty line, including 2.6% of those under age 18 and 2.7% of those age 65 or over.

Historical population
Census	Pop.	Note	%±
2000	17,786		—
2010	18,610		4.6%
2020	20,072		7.9%
sources 2010-2020

== Education ==
Lorton is part of the Fairfax Public School System. There are six elementary schools to serve Lorton residents, Gunston Elementary, Lorton Station, Silverbrook, Laurel Hill, and Halley. Hayfield Secondary School used to be the only public high school for Lorton area students, but they now attend South County High School.

Fairfax County Public Library operates the Lorton Library in the CDP.

== Economy ==
In November 2020, the Fairfax County Board of Supervisors approved an interim agreement for a proposal to build one of the largest indoor ski facilities in the world in Lorton. The Alpine–X project will be constructed on the closed portion of the Interstate 95 Lorton landfill.

== Community services ==
Library services in the area have expanded from bookmobile service to a store front library and now to a 10,000-square-foot (929.03 m^{2}) building. The Lorton Heritage Society has developed the Lorton History Garden on the library's south side.

Lorton is home to the Noman M. Cole, Jr., Pollution Control Plant. The Noman Cole facility is the largest advanced waste water treatment plant in the Commonwealth of Virginia.

== Transportation ==
=== Rail ===
- The Lorton VRE station is located at 8990 Lorton Station Boulevard. It is currently served by the VRE Fredericksburg Line, which runs between Fredericksburg in the south and Washington Union Station in the north. This station is one mile north of the Amtrak Lorton station, the northern terminal for Amtrak's Auto Train, which runs between the Lorton station and the Sanford station in Sanford, Florida.

=== Bus ===
- Fairfax Connector: Routes 171 & 307
- Vamoose Bus, a privately owned company, provides daily transportation from the Lorton VRE Station parking lot to Penn Station/Madison Square Garden in Midtown Manhattan, New York City.

== Emergency services ==
Lorton Volunteer Fire Department Company 19 is one of 12 private, not-for-profit fire companies working in partnership with Fairfax County Fire and Rescue to provide emergency and non-emergency services. On October 28, 2023, the grand opening for the newly-created Lorton District Police Station commenced, which means that the Fairfax County Police Department officially has a station in the Lorton district of Fairfax County. The station was set up as part of a Public Safety bond approved by voters in November 2015 as a result of officers being drawn from their usual police stations (the Franconia and West Springfield stations), thereby leading to longer response times.

== Notable people ==
- George Ayittey, economist, author and president of the Free Africa Foundation
- Oren Burks, American football linebacker
- Ben Cook, Broadway and television actor
- Carly Fiorina, CEO of Hewlett-Packard from 1999 to 2005
- Sabrina Harman, former US Army soldier
- George Mason, one of the Founding Fathers of the United States, often called the Father of the Bill of Rights
- Travis Morrison, musician and frontman of the band The Dismemberment Plan
- Jonahan Romero, professional soccer player
- Trevor Stewart, Olympic gold and bronze medalist at 2020 Summer Olympics in track and field
- Andi Sullivan, professional soccer player for the Washington Spirit and USWNT
- Melissa Brannen, kidnapped on December 3, 1989 from a Christmas party at Lorton's Woodside Apartments
